= List of proclamations of the First Presidency and the Quorum of the Twelve Apostles =

Formal, written proclamations issued by the First Presidency or Quorum of the Twelve Apostles of the Church of Jesus Christ of Latter-day Saints have been issued on six occasions, most recently April 5, 2020. They are similar to yet distinct from other official statements such as official declarations, doctrinal positions, epistles, and testimonies.

== Proclamations ==
Proclamation	Issuing body	Date	Noted place	Addressed to	Signed by	First publication or meeting presented in	Read by during presentational broadcast	Topic
A Proclamation of the First Presidency of the Church to the Saints Scattered Abroad	First Presidency	January 15, 1841	Nauvoo, Illinois	"to the Saints scattered abroad"	Joseph Smith, Sidney Rigdon, Hyrum Smith	Times and Seasons	N/A	review the progress of the church and the prospects of settling in Nauvoo, Illinois
Proclamation of the Twelve Apostles of The Church of Jesus Christ of Latter-day Saints	Quorum of the Twelve	April 6 (New York City) and October 22 (Liverpool), 1845		"To all the Kings of the World; To the President of the United States of America; To the Governors of the several States; And to the Rulers and People of all Nations"		self-published pamphlets	N/A	announce to the world that God has spoken and provides a warning to all nations
Proclamation of the First Presidency and the Twelve Apostles	First Presidency and the Quorum of the Twelve	October 21, 1865		"ye Latter-day Saints, and all ye inhabitants of the earth who wish to be Saints, to whom this writing shall come"	Brigham Young, Heber C. Kimball, Orson Hyde, John Taylor, Wilford Woodruff, George A. Smith, Amasa M. Lyman, Ezra T. Benson, Charles C. Rich, Lorenzo Snow, Erastus Snow, Franklin D. Richards, George Q. Cannon	Deseret News	N/A	correct doctrinal errors about the nature of God and officially establish the First Presidency as the source of new doctrine
Proclamation of the First Presidency and the Quorum of the Twelve Apostles of The Church of Jesus Christ of Latter-day Saints	First Presidency and the Quorum of the Twelve	April 6, 1980	Fayette, New York	(not specified)	Spencer W. Kimball, Nathan Eldon Tanner, Marion G. Romney, Ezra Taft Benson, Mark E. Petersen, LeGrand Richards, Howard W. Hunter, Gordon B. Hinckley, Thomas S. Monson, Boyd K. Packer, Marvin J. Ashton, Bruce R. McConkie, L. Tom Perry, David B. Haight, James E. Faust	General Conference	Gordon B. Hinckley	commemorate the sesquicentennial of the Church's founding and restate its basic principles to the world
The Family: A Proclamation to the World	First Presidency and the Quorum of the Twelve	September 23, 1995	Salt Lake City, Utah	"responsible citizens and officers of government everywhere"	Gordon B. Hinckley, Thomas S. Monson, James E. Faust, Boyd K. Packer, L. Tom Perry, David B. Haight, Neal A. Maxwell, Russell M. Nelson, Dallin H. Oaks, M. Russell Ballard, Joseph B. Wirthlin, Richard G. Scott, Robert D. Hales, Jeffrey R. Holland, Henry B. Eyring	General Relief Society Meeting	Gordon B. Hinckley	define the nature of family and relationship with God
The Restoration of the Fulness of the Gospel of Jesus Christ: A Bicentennial Proclamation to the World	First Presidency and the Quorum of the Twelve	April 5, 2020	The Sacred Grove (prerecorded)	"all"	Russell M. Nelson, Dallin H. Oaks, Henry B. Eyring, M. Russell Ballard, Jeffrey R. Holland, Dieter F. Uchtdorf, David A. Bednar, Quentin L. Cook, D. Todd Christofferson, Neil L. Andersen, Ronald A. Rasband, Gary E. Stevenson, Dale G. Renlund, Gerrit W. Gong, Ulisses Soares	General Conference	Russell M. Nelson	commemorate the bicentennial of the First Vision and restate its basic principles to the world
