= The Church of Jesus Christ of Latter-day Saints in the Republic of the Congo =

Church in the Republic of the Congo

- Area: Africa Central
- Members: 15,482 (2025)
- Stakes: 5
- Wards: 32
- Branches: 11
- Total Congregations: 43
- Missions: 1
- Temples: 1 under construction
- FamilySearch Centers: 10

The Church of Jesus Christ of Latter-day Saints in the Republic of the Congo refers to the Church of Jesus Christ of Latter-day Saints (LDS Church) and its members living in the Republic of the Congo. The country was opened to the church's missionaries in 1991. Since then, as of November 2025, the church has grown to 13,691 members in 37 congregations.

== History ==
The LDS Church's presence began in the 1980s when Congolese members returning from Europe requested missionaries. The first congregation was organized, and baptisms took place in 1991, the same year the church received official government recognition. The country was dedicated for missionary work in 1992. Despite civil unrest between 1997 and 1999, which sometimes led to the temporary withdrawal of missionaries, local members continued to support each other. The first stake was organized in Brazzaville in 2003, and the Republic of the Congo Brazzaville Mission was created in 2014.

Membership in the Republic of the Congo
Year	Membership
1971	10
1991	99
1995*	1,000
1999	1,602
2004	3,404
2009	4,462
2014	6,053
2019	8,542
2024	12,626
2025	15,482
*Membership was published as an estimated or rounded number. Source: Jim M. Wall, Deseret News, various years, Church Almanac Country Information: Republic of the Congo, Windall J. Ashton

== Stakes ==
Stake Centers in the Republic of the Congo
Green = Stake
Orange = District
Purple = meetinghouse not part of stake or district

As of August 2026, the following stakes existed in the Republic of the Congo:

Stake/District	Organized	Wards	Branches
Brazzaville Republic of the Congo Stake	19 Oct 2003	6	
Diata Republic of the Congo Stake	8 Nov 2020	5	2
Kintélé Republic of the Congo Stake	30 Nov 2025	6	1
Makelekele Republic of the Congo Stake	31 Aug 2014	8	2
Nkayi Republic of the Congo District	19 Apr 2026		5
Pointe-Noire Republic of the Congo Stake	19 Jul 2015	8	1
Other			5

The Ouésso 1st Branch, Ouésso 2nd Branch, Owando Branch, Oyo Branch, and the Republic of Congo Brazzaville Dispersed Members Unit are not part of a stake or district. The Republic of the Congo Brazzaville Dispersed Members Unit serves individuals and families not in proximity to a church meetinghouse.

== Missions ==
The Republic of the Congo Brazzaville Mission boundaries is the same as the country's boundaries.

== Temples ==
The Kinshasa Democratic Republic of the Congo Temple was dedicated on 14 April 2019 by Dale G. Renlund. While not in the Republic of the Congo, this temple is located in proximity to the stakes in the Brazzaville area. On April 3, 2022, church president Russell M. Nelson announced a temple will be built in Brazzaville.

163. Kinshasa Democratic Republic of the Congo Temple; Official website; News & images	
Location: Announced: Groundbreaking: Dedicated: Size:	Kinshasa, Democratic Republic of the Congo; 1 October 2011 by Thomas S. Monson; 12 February 2016 by Neil L. Andersen; 14 April 2019 by Dale G. Renlund; 12,000 sq ft (1,100 m^{2}) on a 5-acre (2.0 ha) site
266. Brazzaville Republic of the Congo Temple (Under construction); Official website; News & images	
Location: Announced: Groundbreaking: Size:	Brazzaville, Republic of the Congo; 3 April 2022 by Russell M. Nelson; 23 August 2025 by Thierry K. Mutombo; 10,000 sq ft (930 m^{2}) on a 1.5-acre (0.61 ha) site

== See also ==
- Religion in the Republic of the Congo
