= Living Christ =

The Living Christ may refer to:

- Jesus, who many Christians believe came back to life at his resurrection
- The Living Christ Series, a 1951 drama film series
- "The Living Christ: The Testimony of the Apostles", a 2000 declaration by leaders of The Church of Jesus Christ of Latter-day Saints
- Living Christ Church, a Sri Lankan autonomous indigenous fellowship of churches
