= The Living Christ: The Testimony of the Apostles =

Latter-day Saint doctrinal statement from 2000

"The Living Christ: The Testimony of the Apostles" is a 2000 restatement of doctrine of the Church of Jesus Christ of Latter-day Saints (LDS Church).

== Description ==
The document is a one-page declaration that was issued on January 1, 2000 and was signed by the fifteen apostles in the LDS Church: the three members of the First Presidency and the members of the Quorum of the Twelve Apostles. The declaration commemorates the birth of Jesus and is a reaffirmation of church doctrines and teachings about him. The text includes quotations of significant scriptural passages from the Bible and other LDS Church scriptures and identifies Jesus as the Jehovah of the Old Testament and Messiah of the New Testament.

According to the LDS Church, the document is meant to commemorate the birth of Jesus Christ approximately two millennia prior.

== Contents ==
Although the Proclamation presents no new doctrines, it provides an official statement of the church on Jesus. Throughout the work are titles of Jesus and descriptions of what He has done for humankind.

=== Titles of Jesus ===
- Jesus Christ
- Jehovah of the Old Testament
- Messiah of the New Testament
- Creator
- Firstborn of the Father
- Only Begotten Son in the flesh
- Firstfruits of them that slept
- Redeemer of the world
- Risen Lord
- Living Christ
- The First and the Last
- Advocate with the father
- King of Kings
- Lord of Lords
- Immortal Son of God
- King Immanuel
- The light, the life, and the hope of the world

== Use and purpose ==
Since it was issued, the document has been frequently featured in church magazines and publications. One commentator has suggested that "the document may have been created to strengthen LDS Christian claims." The church encourages its members to place a copy in their homes and to study it often.

== Signatures ==
The document was signed by the following individuals:

- Gordon B. Hinckley (First Presidency)
- Thomas S. Monson (First Presidency)
- James E. Faust (First Presidency)
- Boyd K. Packer (Quorum of the Twelve)
- L. Tom Perry (Quorum of the Twelve)
- David B. Haight (Quorum of the Twelve)
- Neal A. Maxwell (Quorum of the Twelve)
- Russell M. Nelson (Quorum of the Twelve)
- Dallin H. Oaks (Quorum of the Twelve)
- M. Russell Ballard (Quorum of the Twelve)
- Joseph B. Wirthlin (Quorum of the Twelve)
- Richard G. Scott (Quorum of the Twelve)
- Robert D. Hales (Quorum of the Twelve)
- Jeffrey R. Holland (Quorum of the Twelve)
- Henry B. Eyring (Quorum of the Twelve)

== See also ==
- Public relations of The Church of Jesus Christ of Latter-day Saints
- The Family: A Proclamation to the World
- The Restoration of the Fulness of the Gospel of Jesus Christ: A Bicentennial Proclamation to the World
- Proclamations of the First Presidency and the Quorum of the Twelve Apostles
