= The Church of Jesus Christ of Latter-day Saints in the Democratic Republic of the Congo =

- Area: Africa Central
- Members: 159,771 (2025)
- Stakes: 44
- Districts: 10
- Wards: 322
- Branches: 109
- Total congregations: 431
- Missions: 7
- Temples: 1 operating; 1 under construction; 2 announced; 4 total
- FamilySearch Centers: 58

The Church of Jesus Christ of Latter-day Saints in the Democratic Republic of the Congo refers to the Church of Jesus Christ of Latter-day Saints (LDS Church) and its members in the Democratic Republic of the Congo (DRC). As of 2025, the LDS Church reported 159,771 members in 431 congregations in the DRC, making it the second largest body of LDS Church members in Africa, behind Nigeria. The DRC ranks as having the highest LDS growth rate among countries with more than 25,000 members, as it more than tripled in membership between 2015 and 2025.

== History ==
Membership in the Democratic Republic of the Congo
Year	Membership
1988*	400
1989*	1,400
1995*	5,300
1999	8,197
2004	14,991
2009	20,883
2014	42,689
2019	68,871
2024	134,067
2025	159,771
*Membership was published as a rounded number.

The LDS Church was first recognized in Zaire in 1986. That year the first missionaries began preaching in Kinshasa. The establishment of the church was aided by the Banza family, who had joined the church while studying at a university in Geneva, Switzerland. The third petitioner to establish the church that year was Nkitabungi Mbuyi, who had joined while studying in Belgium and subsequently served as a missionary for the church in England before his return to Zaire. The church has grown quickly since then, with the first stake being organised in 1996.

Since establishing itself in the country, the LDS Church has played a large role in providing humanitarian aid services in the nation. This has involved installing clean water distribution systems in areas where sanitation and water are low.

In 2011, it was reported that the church had reached a total of 100 congregations in the DRC.

By late 2019, the church had 22 stakes and one district as well as several branches directly under missions in the DRC.

== Stakes and districts ==
As of July 2026, the following stakes and districts were located in the Democratic Republic of the Congo:

Stake	Organized	Mission
Bandundu DRC District	8 Jun 2025	DRC Kinshasa South
Boma DRC District	23 Nov 2025	DRC Kinshasa West
Bondoyi DRC Stake	9 Jun 2024	DRC Mwene-Ditu
Dibindi DRC Stake	11 Dec 2022	DRC Mbuji-Mayi
Diulu DRC Stake	28 Dec 2025	DRC Mbuji-Mayi
Fungurume DRC Stake	26 Jul 2026	DRC Kolwezi
Kabusanga DRC Stake	5 Dec 2021	DRC Mwene-Ditu
Kananga DRC Lukonga Stake	15 Jun 2025	DRC Kananga
Kananga DRC Ndesha Stake	15 Jun 2025	DRC Kananga
Kananga DRC Nganza Stake	15 Jun 2025	DRC Kananga
Kananga DRC Stake	21 May 2011	DRC Kananga
Kasapa DRC Stake	1 Dec 2024	DRC Lubumbashi
Kasumbalesa DRC Stake	9 Nov 2025	DRC Lubumbashi
Katoka DRC Stake	13 Dec 2015	DRC Kananga
Katuba DRC Stake	15 Mar 2009	DRC Lubumbashi
Kikula DRC Stake	4 Jul 2021	DRC Kolwezi
Kikwit DRC District	22 Jun 2025	DRC Kinshasa South
Kimpese DRC District	30 Nov 2025	DRC Kinshasa West
Kinshasa DRC Binza Stake	25 Nov 2012	DRC Kinshasa North
Kinshasa DRC Binza UPN Stake	15 Sep 2024	DRC Kinshasa West
Kinshasa DRC Fer Bois Stake	9 Nov 2025	DRC Kinshasa South
Kinshasa DRC Kimbanseke Stake	23 Aug 2009	DRC Kinshasa South
Kinshasa DRC Kimbwala Stake	15 Jun 2025	DRC Kinshasa West
Kinshasa DRC Limete Stake	9 Feb 2025	DRC Kinshasa East
Kinshasa DRC Lukunga Stake	10 Feb 2019	DRC Kinshasa West
Kinshasa DRC Mapela Stake	29 Jun 2025	DRC Kinshasa East
Kinshasa DRC Masina Stake	2 May 1999	DRC Kinshasa East
Kinshasa DRC Mikonga Stake	1 Dec 2024	DRC Kinshasa South
Kinshasa DRC Mont Amba Stake	9 May 2026	DRC Kinshasa South
Kinshasa DRC Mont Ngafula Stake	13 Apr 2008	DRC Kinshasa West
Kinshasa DRC Mpasa Stake	24 Jun 2018	DRC Kinshasa South
Kinshasa DRC N'Djili Stake	24 Jun 2018	DRC Kinshasa South
Kinshasa DRC Ngaba Stake	29 May 2016	DRC Kinshasa North
Kinshasa DRC Ngaliema Stake	9 Nov 2003	DRC Kinshasa North
Kinshasa DRC Siforco Stake	16 Dec 2012	DRC Kinshasa East
Kinshasa DRC Stake	3 Nov 1996	DRC Kinshasa North
Kintambo DRC Stake	8 Dec 2024	DRC Kinshasa North
Kisanga DRC Stake	25 Aug 2013	DRC Lubumbashi
Kisangani DRC District	2 Apr 2023	DRC Kinshasa East
Kolwezi DRC Joli Site Stake	27 Jul 2025	DRC Kolwezi
Kolwezi DRC Stake	22 Sep 2019	DRC Kolwezi
Likasi DRC Stake	26 Jun 2016	DRC Kolwezi
Lubumbashi DRC Bel-Air Stake	8 Mar 2026	DRC Lubumbashi
Lubumbashi DRC Stake	7 Sep 1997	DRC Lubumbashi
Lubumbashi DRC Upemba Stake	30 Nov 2025	DRC Lubumbashi
Lubunga DRC District	11 May 2025	DRC Kinshasa East
Luiza DRC District	9 Nov 2025	DRC Kananga
Lukalaba DRC District	31 May 2026	DRC Mbuji-Mayi
Luputa DRC Katubi Stake	23 Nov 2025	DRC Mwene-Ditu
Luputa DRC Stake	26 Jun 2011	DRC Mwene-Ditu
Malandji DRC Stake	8 Dec 2019	DRC Kananga
Maluku DRC District	5 Jun 2026	DRC Kinshasa South
Matadi DRC Stake	4 May 2025	DRC Kinshasa West
Mbandaka DRC District	8 Feb 2026	DRC Kinshasa East
Mbuji-Mayi DRC Stake	24 Apr 2016	DRC Mbuji-Mayi
Muanda DRC District	16 Nov 2025	DRC Kinshasa West
Mwene-Ditu DRC Stake	3 Feb 2019	DRC Mwene-Ditu
Ngandajika DRC Kabanda Stake	11 Jan 2026	DRC Mbuji-Mayi
Ngandajika DRC Kalubanda Stake	12 Mar 2023	DRC Mbuji-Mayi
Ruashi DRC Stake	22 Oct 2017	DRC Lubumbashi
Tshikapa DRC District	14 Dec 2025	DRC Kananga
Tshitenge DRC District	15 Jun 2025	DRC Mbuji-Mayi

== Missions ==
Mission	Organized
Democratic Republic of the Congo Kananga	1 Jul 2023
Democratic Republic of the Congo Kinshasa East	28 Jun 2019
Democratic Republic of the Congo Kinshasa North	1 Jul 2026
Democratic Republic of the Congo Kinshasa South	1 Jul 2024
Democratic Republic of the Congo Kinshasa West	1 Jul 1987
Democratic Republic of the Congo Kolwezi	1 Jul 2024
Democratic Republic of the Congo Lubumbashi	30 Jun 2010
Democratic Republic of the Congo Mbuji-Mayi	1 Jul 2016
Democratic Republic of the Congo Mwene-Ditu	1 Jul 2026

== Temples ==
Temples in the Democratic Republic of the Congo
Red = Operating
Blue = Under Construction
Yellow = announced
Black = Closed for Renovations

On October 1, 2011 the Kinshasa Democratic Republic of the Congo Temple was announced by church president Thomas S. Monson. On February 12, 2016 ground was broken for the temple in a ceremony conducted by Neil L. Andersen of the Quorum of the Twelve Apostles. The temple was dedicated by Dale G. Renlund on April 14, 2019. Since then three other temples have been announced.

163. Kinshasa Democratic Republic of the Congo Temple; Official website; News & images	
Location: Announced: Groundbreaking: Dedicated: Size:	Kinshasa, Democratic Republic of the Congo; 1 October 2011 by Thomas S. Monson; 12 February 2016 by Neil L. Andersen; 14 April 2019 by Dale G. Renlund; 12,000 sq ft (1,100 m^{2}) on a 5-acre (2.0 ha) site
239. Lubumbashi Democratic Republic of the Congo Temple (Under construction); Official website; News & images	
Location: Announced: Groundbreaking: Size:	Lubumbashi, Democratic Republic of the Congo; 5 April 2020 by Russell M. Nelson; 20 August 2022 by Matthew L. Carpenter; 19,300 sq ft (1,790 m^{2}) on a 2.57-acre (1.04 ha) site
302. Kananga Democratic Republic of the Congo Temple (Site announced); Official website; News & images	
Location: Announced: Size:	Kananga, Democratic Republic of the Congo; 3 October 2021 by Russell M. Nelson; 11,000 sq ft (1,000 m^{2}) on a 1.6-acre (0.65 ha) site
334. Mbuji-Mayi Democratic Republic of the Congo Temple (Announced); Official website; News & images	
Location: Announced:	Mbuji-Mayi, Democratic Republic of the Congo; 1 October 2023 by Russell M. Nelson

== See also ==
- The Church of Jesus Christ of Latter-day Saints membership statistics
- The Church of Jesus Christ of Latter-day Saints in Ghana
- Religion in the Democratic Republic of the Congo
- Christianity in the Democratic Republic of the Congo
