= The Family: A Proclamation to the World =

1995 statement by the LDS Church

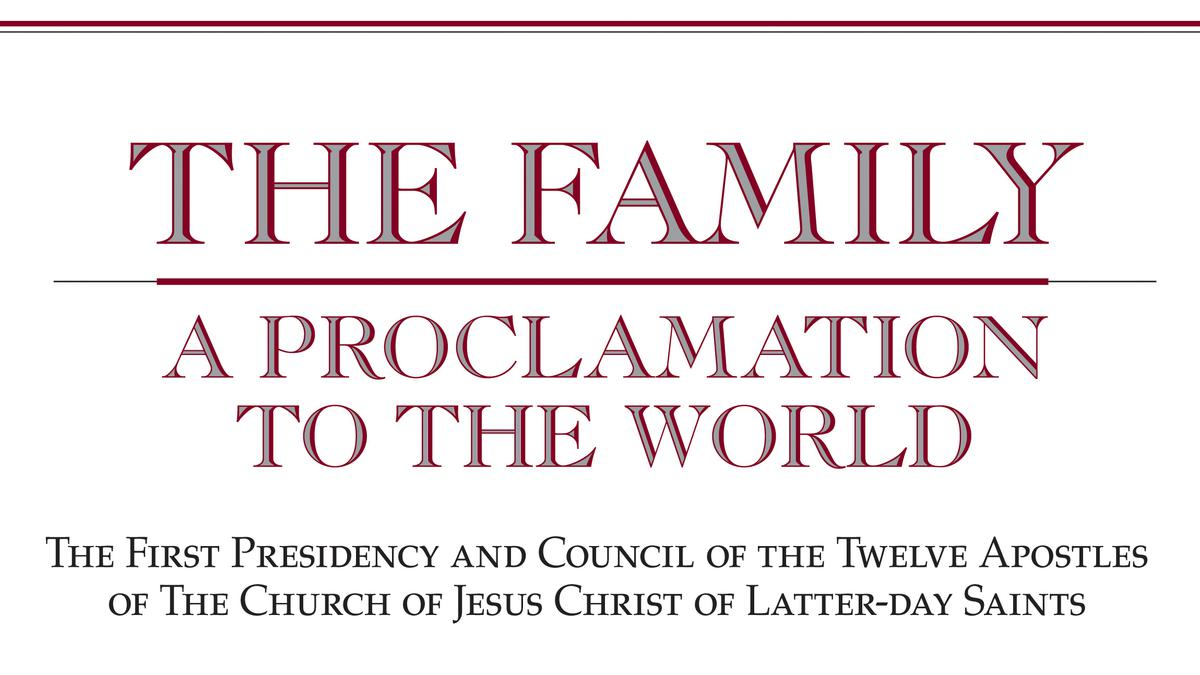
"The Family: A Proclamation to the World" heading

"The Family: A Proclamation to the World" is a 1995 statement issued by the Church of Jesus Christ of Latter-day Saints (LDS Church) which defined the church's official position on family, marriage, gender roles, and human sexuality. It was first announced by church president Gordon B. Hinckley.

== History ==
Hinckley first read the proclamation on September 23, 1995, at the church's General Relief Society (women’s) Meeting, stating that the purpose was to "warn and forewarn" the world to the danger of deviating from its standards. In 2017, Dallin H. Oaks gave a talk in general conference suggesting the text of the proclamation was composed solely by the First Presidency and Quorum of the Twelve Apostles.

In 1997, the LDS Church included the text of the proclamation in an amicus brief to petition the Hawaii Supreme Court to reject same-sex marriage. The case was Baehr v. Miike (originally Baehr v. Lewin).

The proclamation has been discussed and referenced in the church's general conferences as well as in many other types of church meetings throughout the world. For instance, the proclamation and the associated issues addressed were discussed during the church's 2008 worldwide leadership training meeting.

The proclamation has also been influential among leaders of other religious traditions. For example, in 2014 the Vatican's Humanum: An International Interreligious Colloquium on the Complementarity of Man and Woman featured several world leaders including Pope Francis and Muslim theologian Dr. Rasoul Rasoulipour quoting from or citing its basic teachings.

== Contents ==
Although the proclamation presents no new doctrines or policies, it provides an official statement of the church on gender and sexual relations.

=== Doctrinal assertions ===
- Marriage between a man and a woman is ordained of God.
- The family is ordained of God and central to God's plan.
- All human beings are created in the image of God.
- As a beloved spirit son or daughter of Heavenly Parents, each person has a divine nature and destiny.
- Gender (Note: Dallin H. Oaks, one of the apostles at the time the document was issued, instructed a group of church leaders in October 2019 that "the intended meaning of gender in the family proclamation and as used in Church statements and publications since that time is biological sex at birth.") is an essential characteristic of human identity before, during, and after life on Earth.
- "In the premortal realm, spirit sons and daughters knew and worshiped God as their Eternal Father and accepted His plan."
- "Sacred ordinances and covenants available in holy temples of the Church of Jesus Christ of Latter-day Saints make it possible for individuals to return to the presence of God and for families to be united eternally."
- God will hold parents accountable for the way in which they fulfill responsibilities to their families.
- "Children are entitled to birth within the bonds of matrimony, and to be reared by a father and a mother who honor marital vows with complete fidelity."

=== Items of counsel ===
- God's commandment to Adam and Eve in the Garden of Eden to multiply and replenish the earth remains in force.
- Sexual relations are sacred and properly take place only between a man and a woman, lawfully wedded as husband and wife.
- Procreation is divinely appointed, and therefore life is sacred and an important part of God's plan.
- Parents have "a solemn responsibility to love and care for each other and for their children."
- Parents' responsibilities toward their children include rearing them "in love and righteousness," providing "for their physical and spiritual needs," and teaching "them to love and serve one another, observe the commandments of God, and be law-abiding citizens."
- Happiness and success come through following the teachings of Jesus and through "faith, prayer, repentance, forgiveness, respect, love, compassion, work, and wholesome recreational activities."
- "By divine design fathers are to preside over their families in love and righteousness and are responsible to provide the necessities of life and protection for their families."
- "Mothers are primarily responsible for the nurture of their children."
- "Fathers and mothers are obligated to help one another as equal partners."
- "Disability, death, or other circumstances may necessitate individual adaptation."
- Citizens and officers of government should "promote those measures designed to maintain and strengthen the family as the fundamental unit of society."

=== Warnings ===
- Those who commit adultery or "abuse spouse or offspring, or who fail to fulfill family responsibilities will one day stand accountable before God."
- Disintegration of the family will bring "calamities foretold by ancient and modern prophets."

== Criticism ==
The LGBT advocacy group Human Rights Campaign has cited the proclamation as an indication that although telling families not to reject children due to their sexual orientation and telling members to treat them with love and compassion, the church restricts those who believe themselves to be gay, lesbian, bisexual, and transgender from fully integrating into the LDS Church if they act on their same-sex attraction. Those who do act on their feelings may be disciplined in various ways including excommunication, though this last form of discipline would be reserved for instances when someone has taken a course of action which is contrary to the church's Law of Chastity. Because discipline is administered locally, actual practice differs geographically.

The church also issued this statement after the Human Rights Campaign's criticism:

The Church recognizes that those of its members who are attracted to others of the same sex experience deep emotional, social and physical feelings. The Church distinguishes between feelings or inclinations on the one hand and behavior on the other. It’s not a sin to have feelings, only in yielding to temptation. There is no question that this is difficult, but Church leaders and members are available to help lift, support and encourage fellow members who wish to follow Church doctrine. Their struggle is our struggle. Those in the Church who are attracted to someone of the same sex but stay faithful to the Church’s teachings can be happy during this life and perform meaningful service in the Church. They can enjoy full fellowship with other Church members, including attending and serving in temples, and ultimately receive all the blessings afforded to those who live the commandments of God.

== Status ==
The LDS Church has characterized the proclamation as a reaffirmation of standards "repeatedly stated throughout its history." Apostle Boyd K. Packer also stated in general conference that it "qualifies according to the definition as a revelation and it would do well that members of the Church read and follow it." It is particularly important because, although not canonized, the proclamation is only the fifth such statement in the history of the church. The proclamation was especially authoritative because it was issued in the name of the three members of the First Presidency and the members of the Quorum of the Twelve Apostles, each of these individuals are considered by LDS Church members as "prophet, seer, and revelators." The principles established by the proclamation were cited by Latter-day Saints during the campaign by the LDS Church and its members in support of California Proposition 8 (2008).

== See also ==
- Proclamations of the First Presidency and the Quorum of the Twelve Apostles
- 2000 California Proposition 22
- Homosexuality and the Church of Jesus Christ of Latter-day Saints
- List of Mormon family organizations
- "The Living Christ: The Testimony of the Apostles"
- "The Restoration of the Fulness of the Gospel of Jesus Christ: A Bicentennial Proclamation to the World"
