= The Church of Jesus Christ of Latter-day Saints in South Africa =

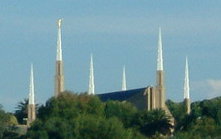
- The Johannesburg South Africa Temple
- Area: Africa South
- Members: 78,689 (2025)
- Stakes: 18
- Districts: 9
- Wards: 112
- Branches: 85
- Total congregations: 197
- Missions: 4
- Temples: 2 operating; 1 under construction; 3 total
- FamilySearch Centers: 106

Three missionaries of The Church of Jesus Christ of Latter-day Saints (LDS Church) started proselyting to white English-speaking people in Cape Town in 1853. Most converts from this time emigrated to the United States. The mission was closed in 1865, but reopened in 1903. The South African government limited the number of missionaries allowed to enter the country in 1921 and in 1955. Starting around 1930, a man had to trace his genealogy out of Africa to be eligible for the priesthood, since black people were not permitted to be ordained. In 1954 when church president David O. McKay visited South Africa, he removed the requirement for genealogical research for a man to be ordained, stipulating only that "there is no evidence of his having Negro blood in his veins".

After the church's 1978 Revelation on Priesthood removed the official prohibition against black priests, local opposition continued. The South African government lifted the restrictions on visiting missionaries. The Book of Mormon was translated into Afrikaans in 1972, to Zulu in 1987, and to Xhosa in 2000. The Transvaal Stake was organized in South Africa in 1970 and the Pretoria Stake was organized in 1978. At some point between 2000 and 2005, the number of black members of the LDS Church in South Africa exceeded fifty percent of the church's total membership in the country.

== Early missionary efforts ==
The first Latter-day Saint missionaries to what is now South Africa, Jesse Haven, Leonard I. Smith and William H. Walker, arrived in Cape Colony at Cape Town on 19 April 1853. The first LDS branch was organized at Mowbray on 16 August 1853. When the missionaries tried to organize meetings, mobs would disperse them. Local preachers told their congregations not to feed or house the missionaries and encouraged new converts to leave the LDS church.

In 1855, the original three missionaries went home and encouraged their fellow Latter-day Saints to emigrate to Utah and helped raise funds for them to do so. When local boat captains refused to transport Mormons, John Stock, Thomas Parker, and Charles Roper of Port Elizabeth sold their sheep and bought their own boat. Between 1855 and 1865, some 270 church members emigrated to the United States from Port Elizabeth. In 1858, only 243 local members remained. Missionaries to Durban and Pietermaritzburg in 1863 experienced harassment similar to the first missionaries, like angry mobs and little protection from local constables. The mission closed in 1865 because of government restrictions, and a lack of knowledge of Afrikaans, isolation from church headquarters, and local opposition to polygamy.

Most early converts were of British descent, and were often people born in Britain because proselyting efforts focused on English-speaking individuals of European descent, since blacks were not allowed to hold the priesthood at the time and the missionaries did not know how to speak Afrikaans. In 1905, Lyon baptized a man with the last name of Dunn who was the son of a Scottish father and a Zulu mother. Dunn is believed to be the first black African convert baptized in Africa, though he did not remain an active member for long. Another early convert of African descent was William Paul Daniels, who joined the LDS Church in 1915 while visiting relatives in Utah. He met on multiple occasions with Joseph F. Smith before returning to South Africa.

== Early 20th century ==
Membership in South Africa
Year	Membership
1930	682
1940	1,571
1950	1,372
1960	2,901
1970	5,637
1979	6,831
1989*	17,000
1999	29,220
2009	48,112
2019	64,123
2025	78,689
*Membership was published as a rounded number.

The mission was reopened in 1903 under the direction of William H. Lyon. The first LDS meetinghouse was built in 1916 also in Mowbray. In 1925, the "Old Ramah" LDS chapel was constructed on Commissioner Street in Johannesburg.

After World War I, the South African government lifted a 1919 restriction in 1921. In 1955, the South African government again limited the amount of visiting missionaries from the United States, and the church began to send many Canadians as missionaries to South Africa, since as fellow citizens of the Commonwealth they did not fall under visa restrictions.

The Relief Society was established in 1921. In 1930, the church established a genealogy program to help male members trace their genealogy to a European country to determine their eligibility for the priesthood, with final approval for receiving the priesthood given by the mission president. Johanna Fourie instituted the Primary Association in Cape Town in 1932 and supported the program throughout her life. Starting in 1927 until 1970 the mission published a monthly periodical originally known as the Cumorah Monthly Cross.

Evan P. Wright served as mission president over the South Africa Mission 1948–1953. Wright repeatedly expressed to the First Presidency the difficulty in establishing the church in the region caused by the ban on ordaining men of black African descent to the priesthood. This was especially problematic because previous general authorities required even men who appeared white to prove a total lack of black African ancestry before they could be ordained and records were often unavailable or incomplete. Two missionaries had been given the duty to work on genealogy research for the purposes of establishing which people were eligible for the priesthood. David O. McKay was the first general authority to visit South Africa in 1954, and during his visit to the mission, he changed the policy to allow mission presidents to approve men to be ordained without any genealogical research in cases where "there is no evidence of his having Negro blood in his veins."

After McKay's visit, members were more interested in building their own chapels. The Springs Chapel was completed in 1954, and in 1956, chapels in Port Elizabeth and Durban were completed. A chapel in Johannesburg was constructed in 1954.

== Late 20th century ==
The Transvaal Stake was organized in South Africa in 1970 and the Pretoria Stake was organized in 1978. New stakes were made in Durban in 1981 and Cape Town in 1984. In 1972, church seminary and institute programs were started.

=== Black membership ===
Because of local laws and the church's policies restricting priesthood ordination and full temple participation, missionaries baptized very few people of black African origin because without being granted the priesthood they could not hold their own meetings and it was not customary for blacks and whites to meet together for worship meetings. Apartheid laws only technically restricted black people's attendance in white churches if church authorities thought they would make a disturbance, although the South African government requested that LDS Church black and white congregations meet separately. There were some black South Africans, like Moses Mahlangu, who were closely affiliated with the church but not baptized. Mahlangu held regular worship meetings teaching from the Book of Mormon and spent large amounts of time teaching of the Book of Mormon to people in the African townships starting in the late 1960s. He was also in regular contact with the mission presidents. After the 1978 Revelation on Priesthood, Mahlangu, his family, and many other people still waited to be baptized, likely because of lingering feelings of racism among some members of the church. Finally, they were baptized 6 September 1980.

After the 1978 revelation, the South African government revoked its limits on visiting LDS Church missionaries, and the LDS Church started actively proselyting to blacks. Church president Spencer W. Kimball visited Johannesburg in 1978 for an area conference, and the first black branches formed in Soweto in the 1980s. Some white members were specially assigned to attend the branch in Soweto to help with integration, which was difficult but somewhat successful. In 1985, the Johannesburg temple was dedicated.

As of the early 1990s the majority of Latter-day Saints in South Africa were English-speaking white people, mainly of British origin. At some point between 2000 and 2005 the LDS Church reached a point where half the members in South Africa were black, and the percentage of blacks in the membership has continued to rise since then. Two black South Africans have been called as mission presidents. One, Jackson MKabela, was called to serve as mission president in Zimbabwe. He had previously been an area seventy and his wife Dorah had been a member of the Young Women General Board. Mkabela had become the first black man to serve as a stake president in South Africa in 2005. The other, Thabo Lebethoa, was called to preside over the South Africa Cape Town Mission. He was serving as stake president of the Soweto Stake at the time of his call.

=== Other countries in the South Africa mission ===
Zimbabwe, which had been under the South Africa Mission since the start of LDS meetings there in the 1950s, was made its own mission in 1987. When missionary work began in Madagascar in 1991 it was under the auspices of the Durban Mission, but Madagascar was made its own mission in 1998. Mozambique was under the Johannesburg Mission from the arrival of missionaries there in 1999 until 2005. The Botswana-Namibia Mission currently includes some areas of South Africa.

=== Translation of the Book of Mormon into Afrikaans, Zulu, and Xhosa ===
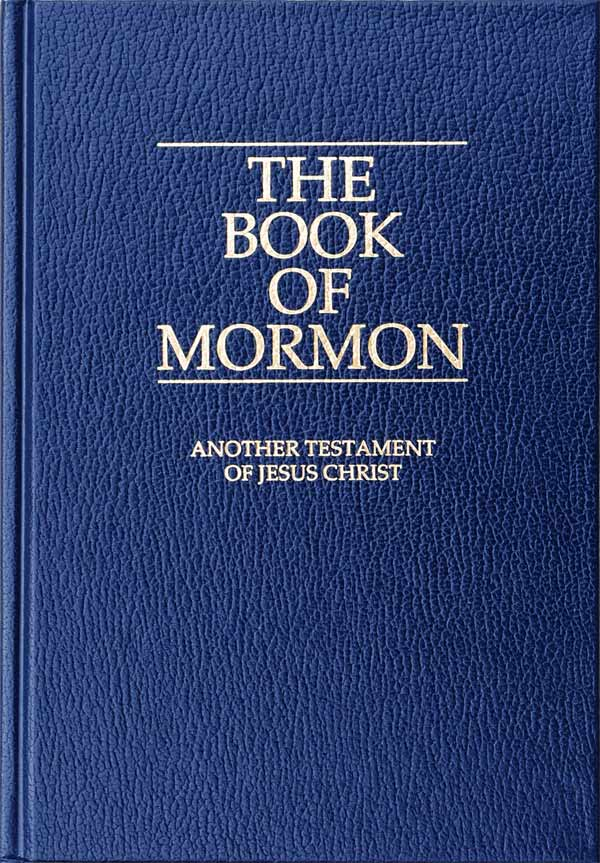
English

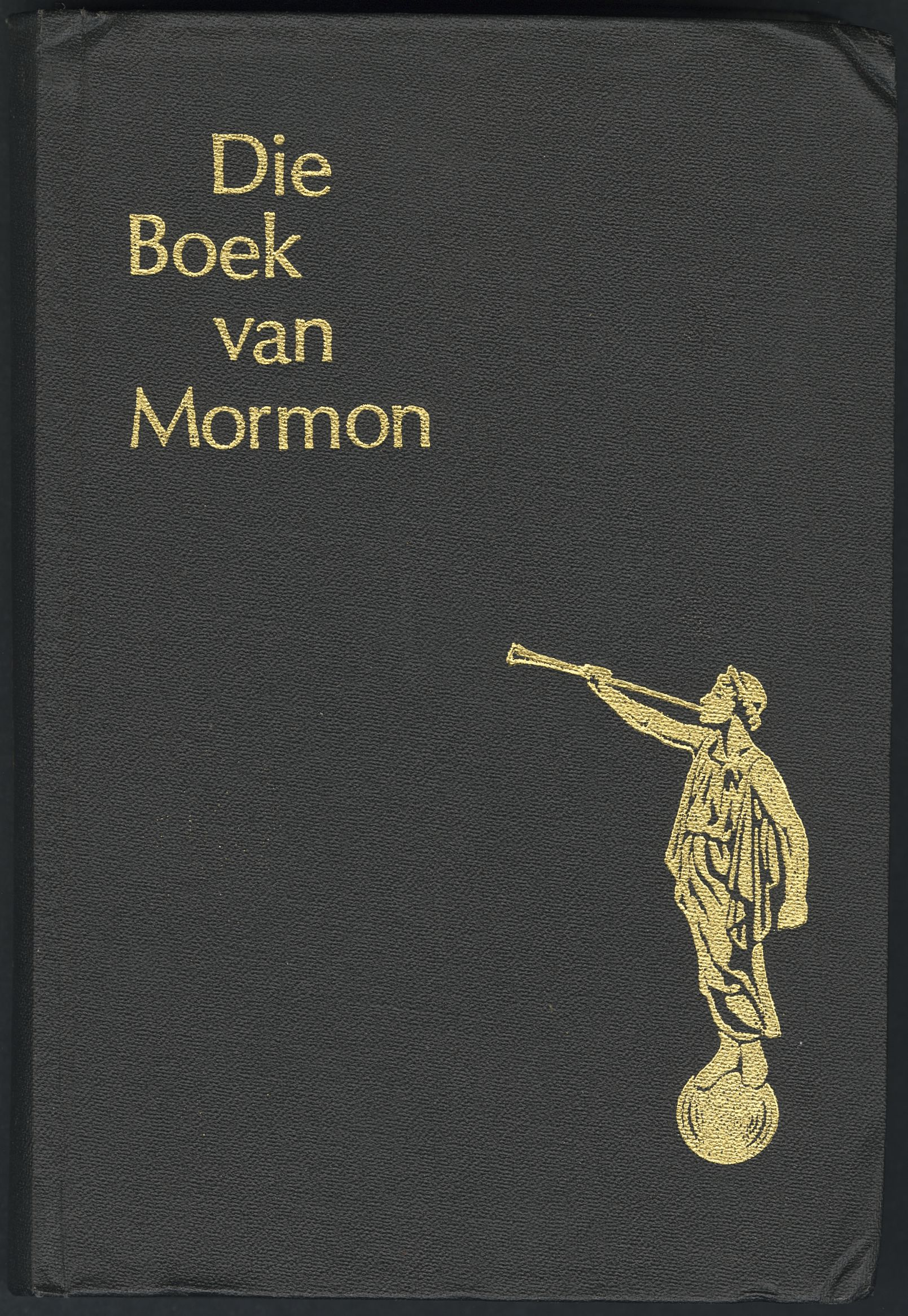
Afrikaans

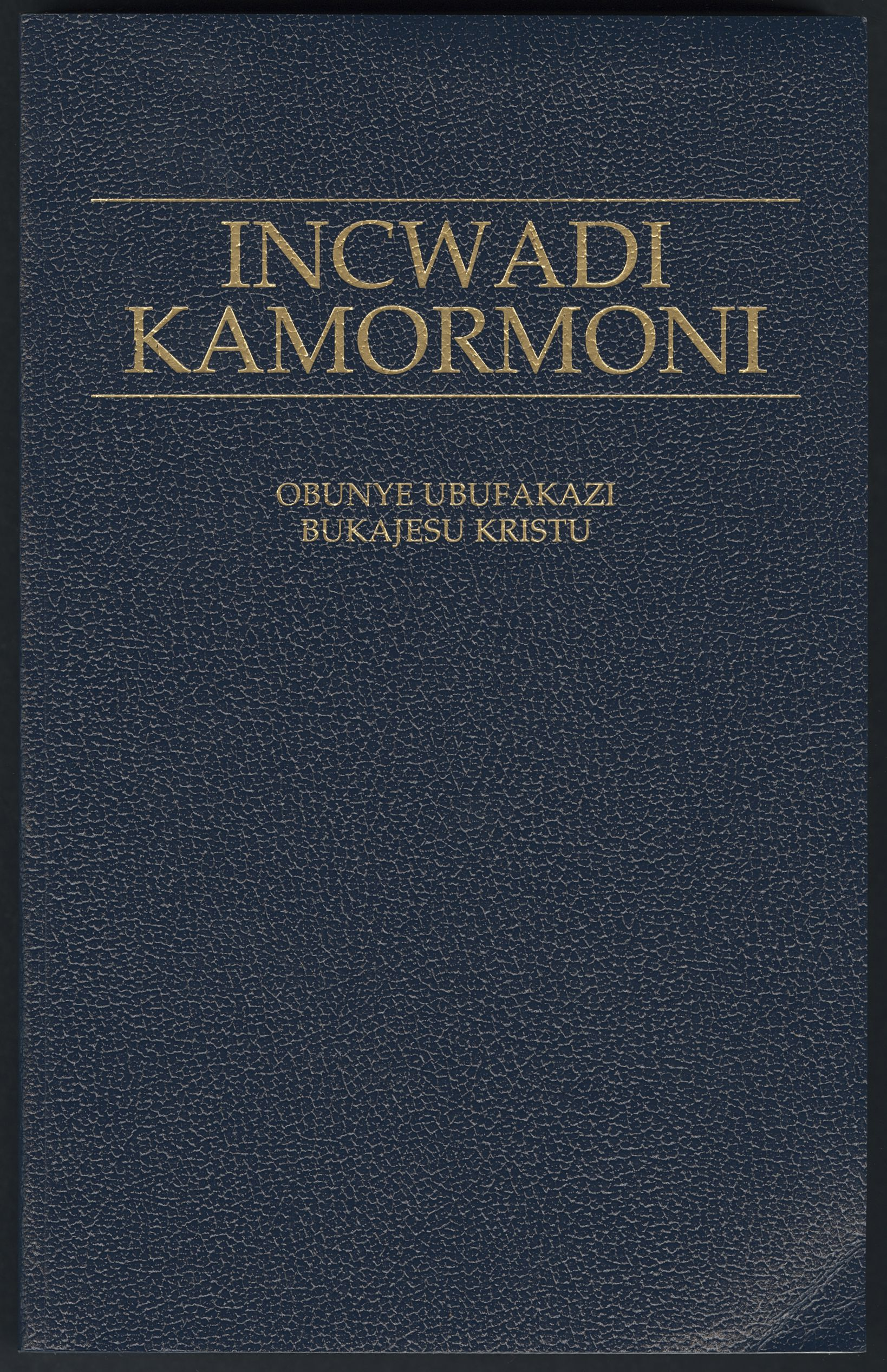
Zulu

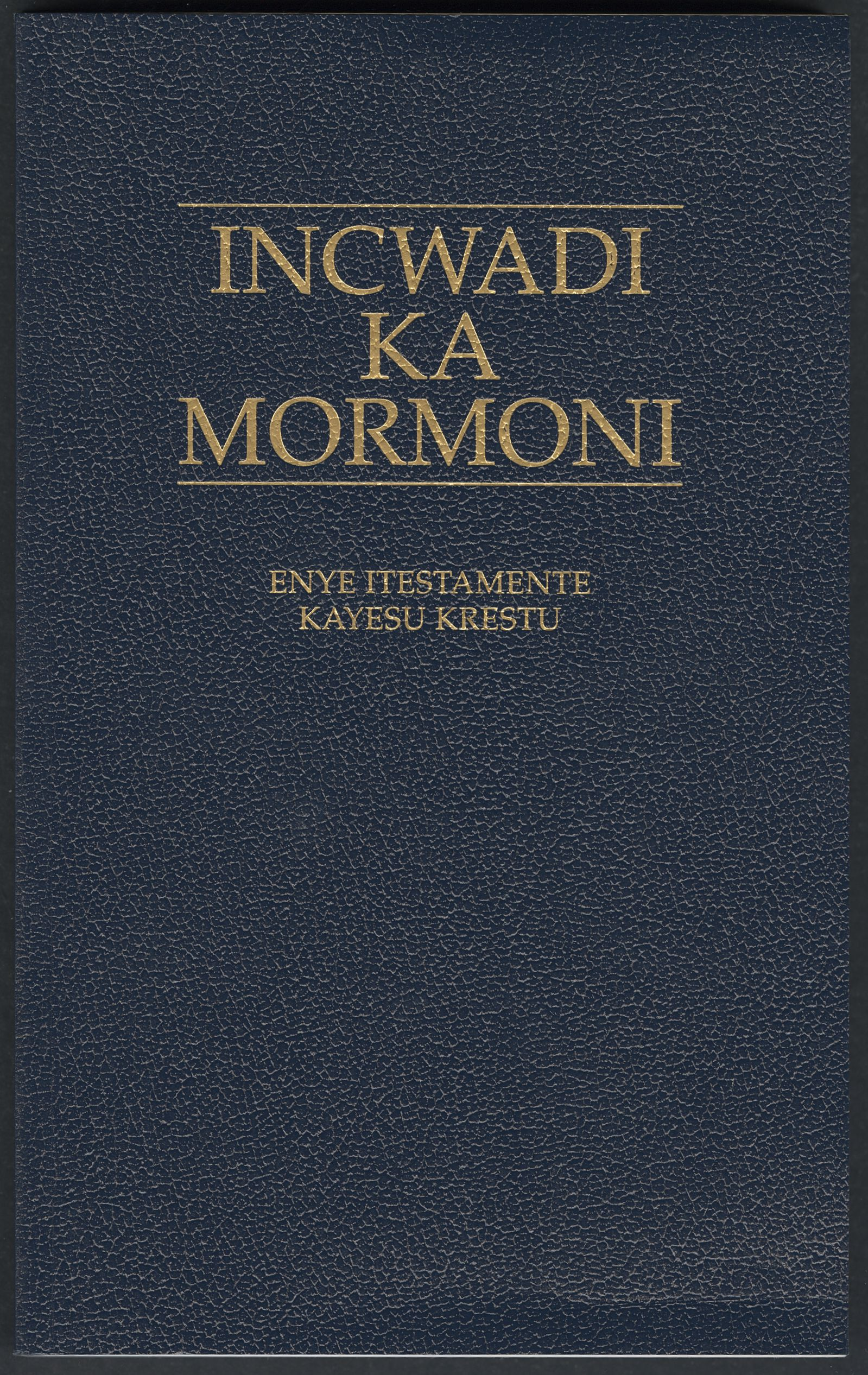
Xhosa

The Book of Mormon in South African languages. Tswana and Sesotho translations are not pictured.

The church did not translate any literature into Afrikaans until 1972 when The Book of Mormon was published in Afrikaans. Felix Mynhardt, a gifted polyglot who was not a member of the LDS church, assisted Johann P. Brummer in translating The Book of Mormon into Afrikaans. The translation of the Doctrine and Covenants and the Pearl of Great Price in Afrikaans was completed in 1981.

Selections of the Book of Mormon were published in Zulu in 1987, and a complete translation was printed in 2015. Translation of the Book of Mormon into Xhosa was completed in 2000 and into Setswana in the early 2000s.

== Stakes and districts ==
As of 2026, South Africa had the following stakes and districts:

Stake/District	Organized	Mission	Temple District
Bedfordview South Africa Stake	15 Feb 1998	South Africa Johannesburg	Johannesburg South Africa
Bellville South Africa Stake	2 Mar 2014	South Africa Cape Town	Johannesburg South Africa
Benoni South Africa Stake	29 Nov 1987	South Africa Johannesburg	Johannesburg South Africa
Bloemfontein South Africa Stake	9 Feb 2013	South Africa Johannesburg	Johannesburg South Africa
Cape Town South Africa Stake	6 May 1984	South Africa Cape Town	Johannesburg South Africa
Centurion South Africa Stake	13 Mar 2011	South Africa Pretoria	Johannesburg South Africa
Durban South Africa Stake	29 Nov 1981	South Africa Durban	Durban South Africa
East London South Africa Stake	17 Feb 2002	South Africa East London	Durban South Africa
George South Africa District	12 Jun 2016	South Africa Cape Town	Johannesburg South Africa
Gqeberha South Africa Stake	12 Jun 2005	South Africa East London	Durban South Africa
Hillcrest South Africa Stake	16 May 1999	South Africa Durban	Durban South Africa
Johannesburg South Africa Central Stake	13 Sep 2026	South Africa Johannesburg	Johannesburg South Africa
Johannesburg South Africa North Stake	22 Mar 1970	South Africa Johannesburg	Johannesburg South Africa
Johannesburg South Africa South Stake	29 Jan 2023	South Africa Johannesburg	Johannesburg South Africa
Klerksdorp South Africa District	2 Feb 2020	South Africa Johannesburg	Johannesburg South Africa
Ladysmith South Africa District	30 Jul 2017	South Africa Durban	Durban South Africa
Mabopane South Africa Stake	28 Jun 2015	South Africa Pretoria	Johannesburg South Africa
Mbombela South Africa District	10 Dec 2017	South Africa Pretoria	Johannesburg South Africa
Mdantsane South Africa Stake	9 Jul 2017	South Africa East London	Durban South Africa
Newcastle South Africa District	24 Feb 2008	South Africa Durban	Durban South Africa
Polokwane South Africa District	2 Jul 2017	South Africa Pretoria	Johannesburg South Africa
Pretoria South Africa Stake	22 Oct 1978	South Africa Pretoria	Johannesburg South Africa
Richards Bay South Africa District	2 Dec 2007	South Africa Durban	Durban South Africa
Roodepoort South Africa Stake	7 May 1995	South Africa Pretoria	Johannesburg South Africa
Soweto South Africa Stake	14 Mar 1999	South Africa Johannesburg	Johannesburg South Africa
Springs South Africa Stake	11 Feb 2018	South Africa Johannesburg	Johannesburg South Africa
Tzaneen South Africa District	29 Nov 2009	South Africa Pretoria	Johannesburg South Africa

== Missions ==
South Africa is home to a Missionary Training Center that serves much of Africa. This is one of two in Africa and one of ten in the LDS Church. In addition to a Missionary Training Center, South Africa has four missions within its boundaries. Namely:

Mission	Organized
South Africa Cape Town Mission	1 Jul 1984
South Africa Durban Mission	1 Jul 1988
South Africa East London Mission	1 Jul 2026
South Africa Johannesburg Mission	19 Apr 1853
South Africa Pretoria Mission	28 Jun 2023

The South Africa Pretoria Mission was created in July 2023 as a division of the Botswana-Namibia Mission and the South Africa Johannesburg Mission.

=== Eswatini ===
Meetinghouses in Burundi as of May 2025
Orange = District center and meetinghouse
Purple = Meetinghouse
(FHC)= FamilySearch Center

Eswatini was dedicated for missionary work by Elder Neal A. Maxwell on February 21, 1990. The Mbabane Eswatini District (originally called the Mbabane Swaziland District) was organized in 2008. As of year-end 2025, Eswatini had 5,465 members in six branches and is assigned to the South Africa Durban Mission. Two FamilySearch Centers were also located in the country.

Mbabane Eswatini District

- Ezulwini Branch
- Fairview Branch
- Mbabane Branch
- Ngwane Park Branch
- Nhlangano Branch
- Sidwashini Branch

=== Lesotho ===
Meetinghouses in Burundi (May 2025)
Orange = District center and meetinghouse
Purple = Meetinghouse
(FHC)= FamilySearch Center

Lesotho was dedicated for missionary work by Elder Neal A. Maxwell on February 22, 1990. The Maseru Lesotho District was organized on February 28, 2016. As of year-end 2025, Eswatini had 2,278 members in eight branches and is assigned to the South Africa Johannesburg Mission. A FamilySearch Center is located in Maseru.

Maseru Lesotho District

- Khubetsoana Branch
- Leribe Branch
- Maputsoe Branch
- Maseru 1st Branch
- Maseru 2nd Branch
- Masianokeng 1st Branch
- Masianokeng 2nd Branch
- Thetsane Branch

The South Africa Johannesburg Dispersed Members Unit serves individuals and families not in proximity of a meetinghouse.

== Temples ==
Temples in South Africa
Red = Operating
Blue = Under Construction
Yellow = announced
Black = Closed for Renovations

36. Johannesburg South Africa Temple; Official website; News & images	
Location: Announced: Groundbreaking: Dedicated: Size: Style:	Johannesburg, South Africa; 1 April 1981 by Spencer W. Kimball; 27 November 1982 by Marvin J. Ashton; 24 August 1985 by Gordon B. Hinckley; 19,184 sq ft (1,782.3 m^{2}) on a 1-acre (0.40 ha) site Modern adaptation of six-spire design - designed by Church A&E Services and Halford & Halford
168. Durban South Africa Temple; Official website; News & images	
Location: Announced: Groundbreaking: Dedicated: Size:	Umhlanga, South Africa; 1 October 2011 by Thomas S. Monson; 9 April 2016 by Carl B. Cook; 16 February 2020 by Ronald A. Rasband; 19,860 sq ft (1,845 m^{2}) on a 14.49-acre (5.86 ha) site
272. Cape Town South Africa Temple (Under construction); Official website; News & images	
Location: Announced: Groundbreaking: Size:	Cape Town, South Africa; 4 April 2021 by Russell M. Nelson; 25 October 2025 by Carlos A. Godoy; 9,500 sq ft (880 m^{2}) on a 3.79-acre (1.53 ha) site

== See also ==
- Religion in South Africa
