= Kinshasa Democratic Republic of the Congo Temple =

Temple of The Church of Jesus Christ of Latter-day Saints

- Interactive map of Kinshasa Democratic Republic of the Congo Temple
- Number: 163
- Dedication: 14 April 2019, by Dale G. Renlund
- Site: 5 acres (2.0 ha)
- Floor area: 12,000 ft^{2} (1,100 m^{2})
- Official website • News & images

Church chronology
← Rome Italy Temple	Kinshasa Democratic Republic of the Congo Temple	→ Fortaleza Brazil Temple

Additional information
- Announced: 1 October 2011, by Thomas S. Monson
- Groundbreaking: 12 February 2016, by Neil L. Andersen
- Open house: 12–30 March 2019
- Current president: Jean-Jacques Alingi Egombe-O’Lioba
- Location: Kinshasa, Democratic Republic of the Congo
- Coordinates: 4.3275°S 15.2738°E
- Exterior finish: White plaster
- Baptistries: 1
- Ordinance rooms: 1
- Sealing rooms: 1
- Clothing rental: Yes

The Kinshasa Democratic Republic of the Congo Temple is a temple of the Church of Jesus Christ of Latter-day Saints located in Kinshasa, the capital and largest city of the Democratic Republic of the Congo. Announced by church president Thomas S. Monson on October 1, 2011, during general conference, it became the first Latter-day Saint temple in the country and the fourth on the African continent. The temple was designed by Reaveley Engineers + Associates, as a single-story structure finished in white plaster, accented with geometric motifs and landscaping that includes royal palms and herringbone-patterned walkways. A groundbreaking ceremony was held on February 12, 2016, led by Neil L. Andersen of the Quorum of the Twelve Apostles.

Following completion of construction, a public open house was held from March 12 to 30, 2019, and the temple was then dedicated in a single session on April 14, 2019, by Dale G. Renlund. Its interior includes stone sourced from Egypt, porcelain tile from South Africa, and a commissioned painting titled Congo Falls, reflecting the region.

== History ==
The Kinshasa Democratic Republic of the Congo Temple was announced by church president Thomas S. Monson on October 1, 2011, during general conference, concurrently with the Barranquilla Colombia, Durban South Africa, Star Valley Wyoming, and Provo City Center temples. When announced, this increased the total number of temples worldwide to 166. On February 12, 2016, the church announced that the temple would be constructed on a 5-acre (2.0 ha) property located at 51 Croisement Avenue de l’OUA, Quartier Basoko, Commune de Ngaliema in Kinshasa. Preliminary plans were for a single-story structure of more than 12,000 square feet. Previous to this temple's construction, members traveled more than 2,100 miles to attend the Johannesburg South Africa Temple.

A groundbreaking ceremony, to signify the beginning of construction, was held on February 12, 2016, with Neil L. Andersen of the Quorum of the Twelve Apostles presiding. Approximately 800 people attended, including local church members and community leaders. In remarks shared, Andersen stated that craftsman would not be rushed, that they were expected to build the very best, and if it was not, to begin again.

Architectural services were provided by Reaveley Engineers + Associates, and was designed to eventually support a statue of the angel Moroni, although does not currently have one. The lead negotiator for construction of the temple, both with the government and with local subcontractors, was Norman Kamosi, a former Air Congo executive and member of the Congolese Parliament. Kamosi joined the church in Washington, D.C., after having fled there when Joseph Kabile came to power.

Following the completion of the temple, the church announced the public open house that was held from March 12 through March 30, 2019, excluding Sundays. During the open house, approximately 300 invited guests, including government officials and interfaith leaders, toured the temple during VIP previews, along with 50 media members.

The temple was dedicated on April 14, 2019, by Dale G. Renlund of the Quorum of the Twelve Apostles. Joseph W. Sitati, a church general authority who also participated, noted the growth of temples worldwide and expressed that the temple would be a blessing to the entire region.

It is the first Latter-day Saint temple built in the Democratic Republic of the Congo and the fourth constructed on the African continent.

On March 14, 2024, two newlywed couples from Luputa, Democratic Republic of the Congo, traveled over 900 miles to be sealed in the temple, after receiving help from the church’s General Temple Patron Assistance Fund (which provides financial assistance for food, travel and lodging for members to attend the temple, when needed). It turned out that the senior missionary who helped process their applications in Nairobi was at the temple that day and served as a witness to their sealing. Participants described this as a deeply meaningful and providential encounter.

== Design and architecture ==
The temple was designed by Reaveley Engineers + Associates, and the site also includes a stake center, seminary and institute building, patron housing, a guardhouse, and a grounds building. Landscaping includes royal palm trees lining the driveway and walkways paved in a herringbone pattern. The temple includes one ordinance room, one sealing room, and a baptistry.

The temple is a single-story, built with a concrete frame and masonry infill. The exterior is finished in white plaster and topped with a hip-framed steel roof covered by a metal deck. A multi-level steeple is above the main entrance, framed with structural and light-gauge steel. Geometric and diamond motifs are featured throughout the temple.

The 12,000-square-foot interior was constructed using a combination of materials sourced both from the region and abroad. Flooring includes stone imported from Egypt and porcelain tiles from South Africa. Geometric and diamond motifs are found in both the interior and exterior design.

A painting titled Congo Falls, intended to portray the grandeur of the nearby Congo River, was commissioned specifically for the temple. In the dedication prayer, Dale G. Renlund alluded to the symbolism that all members who go to the temple would be like the Congo River, flowing like “a fountain of righteousness” towards God. He also mentioned that the diamond motif throughout the temple depicted a possibility of members becoming “firm, steadfast, and immovable in their faith in Christ and qualify to be (God’s) jewels and receive enduring joy.” He also spoke about the symbolism of early converts, who would toss idols, or old symbols of worship into rivers or waterfalls to represent their commitment.

== Temple presidents ==
The church's temples are directed by a temple president and matron, each typically serving for a term of three years. The president and matron oversee the administration of temple operations and provide guidance and training for both temple patrons and staff.

Serving from 2019 to 2021, Brent L. Jameson was the temple's first president, with Lorraine B. Jameson serving as matron. As of 2024, Jean-Jacques A. Egombe-O’Lioba is the president, with Numelie T. Egombe serving as matron.

== Admittance ==
On October 1, 2018, the church announced the public open house that was held from March 12 to March 30, 2019, excluding Sundays. The temple was dedicated by Dale G. Renlund of the Quorum of the Twelve Apostles on April 14, 2019.

Like all the church's temples, it is not used for Sunday worship services. To members of the church, temples are regarded as sacred houses of the Lord. Once dedicated, only church members with a current temple recommend can enter for worship.

== See also ==
- List of temples of The Church of Jesus Christ of Latter-day Saints
- List of temples of The Church of Jesus Christ of Latter-day Saints by geographic region
- Comparison of temples of The Church of Jesus Christ of Latter-day Saints
- Temple architecture (Latter-day Saints)
- The Church of Jesus Christ of Latter-day Saints in the Democratic Republic of the Congo
