= Norman Kamosi =

Former member of the Parliament of the Democratic Republic of the Congo (1939–2021)

Norman Kamosi (1939, Kikongo Belgian Congo – January 24 2021, Kinshasa) was a former airline executive and member of the Parliament of the Democratic Republic of the Congo.

Kamosi's father was a minister for the American Baptist Church. When he was fairly young, his father became a teacher at a school in Kinshasa. They were later able to move to the Belgian section of the city, where his father served as mayor.

Kamosi completed graduate studies in Belgium, and then returned to the DR Congo as an executive with Air Congo.

After Laurent Kabila came to power, Kamosi fled to Zambia. He later relocated to the United States. There, he became a member of the Church of Jesus Christ of Latter-day Saints and served as a branch president in Washington, D.C. He later was recruited to assist in the building of the church's Kinshasa Democratic Republic of the Congo Temple.

== Sources ==
- Ensign October 2008
- Interpreter article with bio of Kamosi
