= Durban South Africa Temple =

Temple of The Church of Jesus Christ of Latter-day Saints

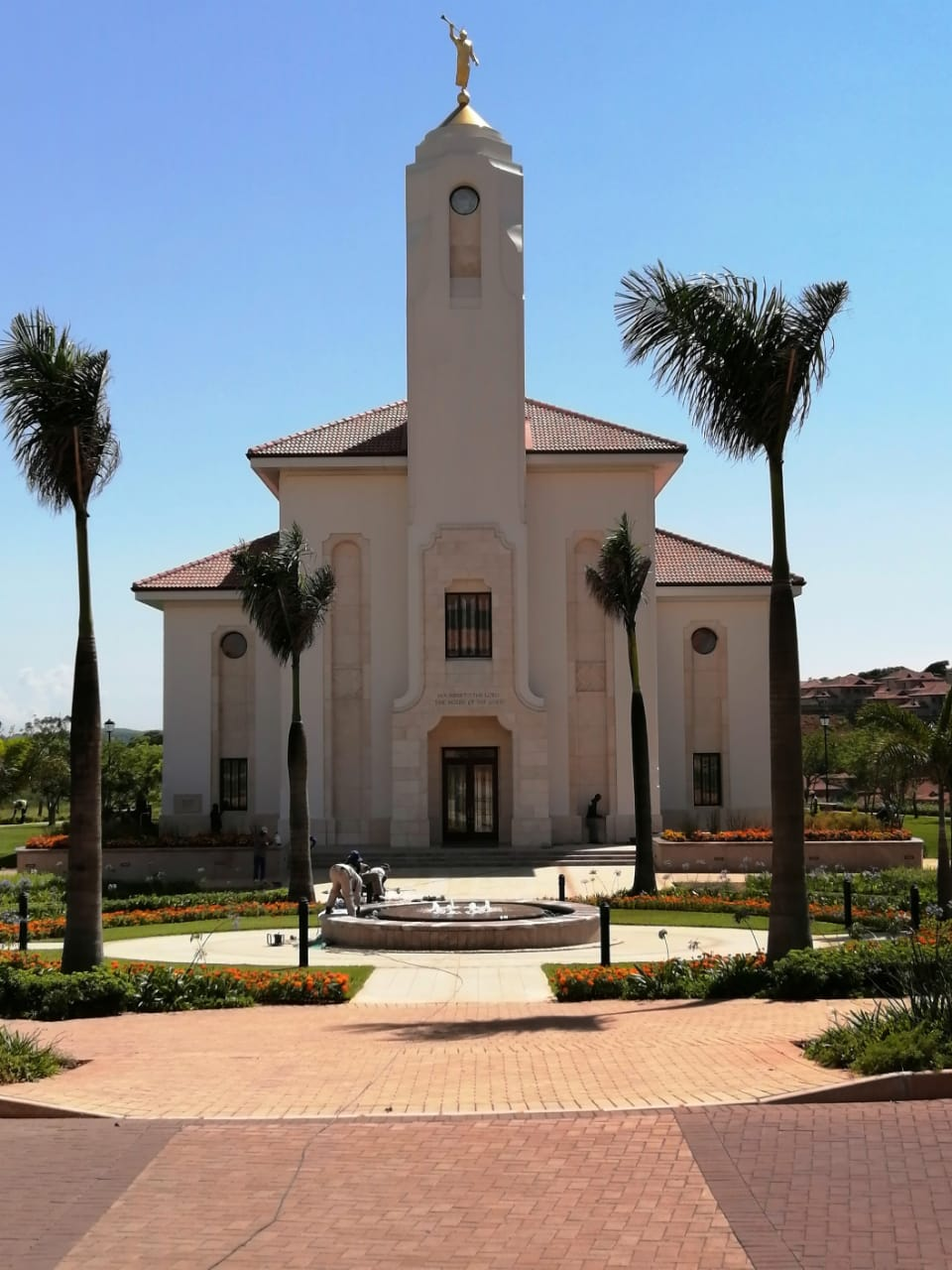
- Interactive map of Durban South Africa Temple
- Number: 168
- Dedication: 16 February 2020, by Ronald A. Rasband
- Site: 14.49 acres (5.86 ha)
- Floor area: 19,860 ft^{2} (1,845 m^{2})
- Height: 97.4 ft (29.7 m)
- Official website • News & images

Church chronology
← Arequipa Peru Temple	Durban South Africa Temple	→ Winnipeg Manitoba Temple

Additional information
- Announced: 1 October 2011, by Thomas S. Monson
- Groundbreaking: 9 April 2016, by Carl B. Cook
- Open house: 22 January-1 February 2020
- Current president: Charles Magaqa
- Location: Umhlanga, South Africa
- Coordinates: 29.7085°S 31.0743°E
- Baptistries: 1
- Ordinance rooms: 1
- Sealing rooms: 1

The Durban South Africa Temple is a temple of the Church of Jesus Christ of Latter-day Saints (LDS Church) in Durban, South Africa. The intent to construct the temple was announced by church president Thomas S. Monson on 1 October 2011. The temple was announced concurrently with the Barranquilla Colombia, Kinshasa Democratic Republic of the Congo, Star Valley Wyoming, and Provo City Center temples. When announced, this increased the total number of temples worldwide to 166 and the number in South Africa to two.

The temple has a single attached end spire with an angel Moroni statue. The temple’s architects were Brian Everett NWL and Sagnelli and Paton Taylor JV. A groundbreaking ceremony, to signify the beginning of construction, was held on April 9, 2016, conducted by Carl B. Cook, a church general authority.

== History ==
The temple was announced by Thomas S. Monson on October 1, 2011. A groundbreaking ceremony, to signify the beginning of construction, took place on 9 April 2016, with Carl B. Cook presiding. Following construction, the LDS Church announced on 18 June 2019 that a public open house would be held from 22 January through 1 February 2020, excluding Sunday. The temple was dedicated on 16 February 2020 by Ronald A. Rasband. It was the last temple dedicated before the church stopped all dedications and rededications for 20 months due to the COVID-19 pandemic. Just after its dedication, like all others in the church, the temple was closed due to the pandemic.

== Design and architecture ==
The temple's architecture reflects both the cultural heritage of Durban and its spiritual significance to the church.

The temple sits on a 14.49-acre plot located north of the Umhlanga city center, in the Izinga development. The indigenous landscaping around the temple features trees, shrubs, vines, and flowers. There are over 800 trees on the grounds, including king palms and coral trees. These elements are designed to provide a tranquil setting that enhances the sacred atmosphere of the site.

The structure stands 97 feet tall, constructed with marble. The exterior has fluted stone panels with geometric carvings drawn from the region’s African roots. The temple also has a pitched red clay tile roof, a design element it shares with the houses in the surrounding neighborhood.

The interior “features more than 50 art pieces, with many depicting the life and ministry of Jesus Christ, as well as various African landscapes.” It also includes marble floors inscribed with tribal geometric patterns, and rugs with a South African basket weaving design.

The temple includes one sealing room, one instruction room, and one baptistry, each designed for ceremonial use.

The design uses symbolic elements representing the heritage of the Durban region. Symbolism is important to church members and include the carved patterns on the temple’s exterior and its floors, which are intended to represent traditional African geometric designs.

== Temple presidents ==
The church's temples are directed by a temple president and matron, each serving for a term of three years. The president and matron oversee the administration of temple operations and provide guidance and training for both temple patrons and staff. The first president and matron, serving from 2020 to 2022, were Leon A. Holmes Elizabeth A. Holmes. As of 2024, the temple’s president and matron are Edward W. Baldwin and Vanessa A. Baldwin.

== Admittance ==
Following the completion of the temple, a public open house was held from January 22 to February 1, 2020 (excluding Sundays). The temple was dedicated by Ronald A. Rasband on February 16, 2020, in three sessions.

Like all the church's temples, it is not used for Sunday worship services. To members of the church, temples are regarded as sacred houses of the Lord. Once dedicated, only church members with a current temple recommend can enter for worship.

== See also ==
Temples in South Africa
Red = Operating
Blue = Under Construction
Yellow = announced
Black = Closed for Renovations
- List of temples of The Church of Jesus Christ of Latter-day Saints
- List of temples of The Church of Jesus Christ of Latter-day Saints by geographic region
- Comparison of temples of The Church of Jesus Christ of Latter-day Saints
- Temple architecture (Latter-day Saints)
- The Church of Jesus Christ of Latter-day Saints in South Africa
