= Johannesburg South Africa Temple =

Temple of The Church of Jesus Christ of Latter-day Saints

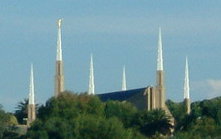
- Interactive map of Johannesburg South Africa Temple
- Number: 36
- Dedication: 24 August 1985, by Gordon B. Hinckley
- Site: 1 acre (0.40 ha)
- Floor area: 19,184 ft^{2} (1,782.3 m^{2})
- Height: 112 ft (34 m)
- Official website • News & images

Church chronology
← Chicago Illinois Temple	Johannesburg South Africa Temple	→ Seoul Korea Temple

Additional information
- Announced: 1 April 1981, by Spencer W. Kimball
- Groundbreaking: 27 November 1982, by Marvin J. Ashton
- Open house: 20 July – 10 August 1985
- Current president: Howard N. Kingsley
- Designed by: Church A&E Services and Halford & Halford
- Location: Johannesburg, South Africa
- Coordinates: 26°10′40.98359″S 28°2′21.10199″E
- Exterior finish: Masonry exterior
- Design: Modern adaptation of six-spire design
- Baptistries: 1
- Ordinance rooms: 4 (stationary)
- Sealing rooms: 3
- Clothing rental: Yes

The Johannesburg South Africa Temple is a temple of the Church of Jesus Christ of Latter-day Saints located in Parktown, Johannesburg, South Africa. The intent to construct the temple was announced by church president Spencer W. Kimball in April 1981. A groundbreaking ceremony was held in November 1982, directed by Marvin J. Ashton of the Quorum of the Twelve Apostles. Dedicated in August 1985 by Gordon B. Hinckley, it was the first temple built on the African continent, marking the point when temples had been established on every inhabited continent. It was also the furthest away geographically from any other operating temple. It was the church's only one in South Africa until the Durban South Africa Temple was dedicated in 2020.

The temple is on a 1-acre site on top of Parktown Ridge, with views extending toward Pretoria. Its modern six-spire design, designed by church architects in collaboration with Hartford & Hartford, has a brick exterior, slate roof, and angel Moroni statue. Inside, the building has four ordinance rooms, three sealing room, and a baptistry.

Over the years, the temple has undergone updates, including a 2017 regilding of the angel Moroni and interior refurbishments. It has been a spiritual hub for church members across southern Africa, supporting congregations from South Africa, Zimbabwe, Botswana, Lesotho, Swaziland, Ghana, and Nigeria.

== History ==
The intent to construct the temple was announced by church president Spencer W. Kimball on April 1, 1981, during a press conference on Temple Square, along with nine other new temples worldwide. On November 27, 1982, a groundbreaking and site dedication was held in Parktown, led by apostle Marvin J. Ashton.

The site at 7 Jubilee Road, Parktown covered 1 acre (0.40 ha) north of central Johannesburg. Plans were created for a modern six-spire design with a total floor area of 19,184 square feet (1,782 m²). Construction used brick cladding (a first for a temple), an original stone from the Nauvoo Temple was placed in the gate.

Following construction, a public open house was held from July 30 to August 10, 1985. The temple was dedicated on August 24 and 25, 1985, in four sessions by Gordon B. Hinckley, then a counselor in the First Presidency. Attendance across the sessions totaled about 3,480 church members.

When it opened, the temple district included South Africa, Zimbabwe, Botswana, Lesotho, Swaziland, Ghana, Namibia, Mascarene Islands, and Nigeria. It remained the sole temple in southern Africa until the Durban South Africa Temple, which was dedicated 35 years later. After it was dedicated, the church then had a temple on every continent except Antartica.

== Design and architecture ==
The temple’s design is a modern six-spire adaptation, created by church architects in collaboration with Hartford & Hartford and overseen locally by Stanley G. Smith. The 1-acre site is located on Parktown Ridge, landscaped with jacaranda and apricot trees, and overlooks the city of Johannesburg to the north and Pretoria—one of South Africa’s three capital cities—to the south.

The exterior is brick with a slate roof. The design uses wrought-iron railings and underground parking, and is topped with six spires. A gilded statue of the angel Moroni stands on the tallest spire, which reaches the full 112-foot height. The 19,184-square-foot interior has four ordinance rooms, three sealing rooms, and a baptistry.

== Renovations and community impact ==
In August 2017, the angel Moroni statue was cleaned and regilded with new 23-carat gold leaf following weathering and minor lightning damage. The temple has also undergone periodic interior refurbishments, including updates to draperies, wall coverings, plumbing, and patron housing facilities.

During its 1985 public open house, more than 19,000 visitors toured the temple, including local civic and business leaders. A former temple president, Robert Canfield, stated that the temple sits on a hill, is prominent, and pilots flying into the area use its light as a beacon, which he said also symbolizes “the good hope the gospel offers to all the people of South Africa.”

== Temple leadership and admittance ==
The church's temples are directed by a temple president and matron, each typically serving for a term of three years. The president and matron oversee the administration of temple operations and provide guidance and training for both temple patrons and staff. Serving from 1985 to 1987, Harlan W. Clark was the first president, with Geraldine M. Clark serving as matron. As of 2024, the temple president and matron are Howard N. Kingsley and Jennifer Kingsley.

A public open house was held July 30–August 10, 1985, and the temple was dedicated by Gordon B. Hinckley on August 24–25, 1985, in four sessions. Like all the church's temples, it is not used for Sunday worship services. To members of the church, temples are regarded as sacred houses of the Lord. Once dedicated, only church members with a current temple recommend can enter for worship.

== See also ==
Temples in South Africa
Red = Operating
Blue = Under Construction
Yellow = announced
Black = Closed for Renovations
- Comparison of temples of The Church of Jesus Christ of Latter-day Saints
- List of temples of The Church of Jesus Christ of Latter-day Saints
- List of temples of The Church of Jesus Christ of Latter-day Saints by geographic region
- Temple architecture (LDS Church)
- The Church of Jesus Christ of Latter-day Saints in South Africa
