= Official Declaration =

The Church of Jesus Christ of Latter-day Saints has twice issued Official Declarations to clarify significant doctrinal issues. Official Declaration 1 was added to the church's official scripture, Doctrine and Covenants, in 1908; Official Declaration 2 in 1981.

Both declarations came in response to controversies surrounding church policies (polygamy and the race ban, respectively) although in neither case did the declaration explicitly repudiate the doctrine as understood, leaving decades to effect the full change the declarations proclaimed.

== See also ==
- Proclamations of the First Presidency and the Quorum of the Twelve Apostles
