= The Restoration of the Fulness of the Gospel of Jesus Christ =

2020 proclamation issued by the Church of Jesus Christ of Latter-day Saints

"The Restoration of the Fulness of the Gospel of Jesus Christ: A Bicentennial Proclamation to the World" is a proclamation issued by the First Presidency and Quorum of the Twelve Apostles of the Church of Jesus Christ of Latter-day Saints outlining the church's views that the church Jesus established fell into apostasy and was restored through Joseph Smith. The proclamation was announced by church president Russell M. Nelson on April 5, 2020, as part of the church's annual general conference. The April 2020 conference had been designated as a celebration of the 200th anniversary of the theophany Smith said he had in 1820, known as the First Vision.

It was the sixth proclamation in the history of the church.

Although the proclamation presents no new doctrine, it provides an official statement on its views of the history and state of the church. After being available online, it was first published by the church in Liahona and Ensign.

== See also ==
- Proclamations of the First Presidency and the Quorum of the Twelve Apostles
- The Living Christ: The Testimony of the Apostles
