= Gary E. Stevenson =

American religious leader (born 1955)

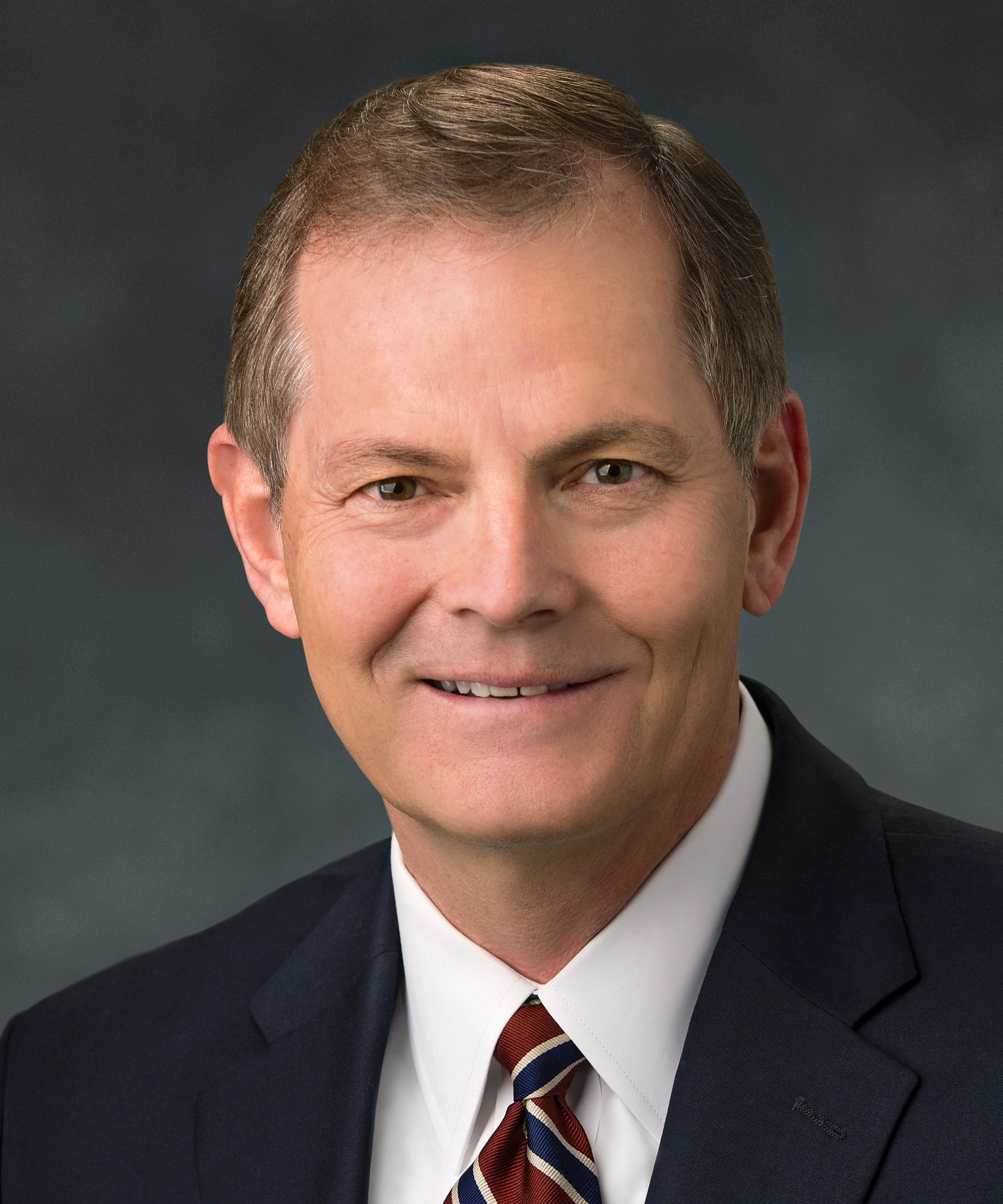
- Stevenson in 2025

Quorum of the Twelve Apostles
- October 3, 2015
- Called by: Thomas S. Monson

LDS Church Apostle
- October 8, 2015
- Called by: Thomas S. Monson
- Reason: Death of Boyd K. Packer

Presiding Bishop
- March 31, 2012 – October 9, 2015
- Predecessor: H. David Burton
- Successor: Gérald Caussé
- End reason: Called to the Quorum of the Twelve Apostles

First Quorum of the Seventy
- April 5, 2008 – March 31, 2012
- End reason: Called to be Presiding Bishop

Personal details
- Born: Gary Evan Stevenson; August 6, 1955 (age 71); Ogden, Utah, United States
- Alma mater: Utah State University (B.S.)
- Spouse(s): Lesa Jean Higley (m. 1979)
- Children: 4

Gary Evan Stevenson (born August 6, 1955) is an American religious leader and former businessman who is a member of the Quorum of the Twelve Apostles of the Church of Jesus Christ of Latter-day Saints. He served previously as the church's Presiding Bishop and was the fourteenth man to serve in that position. He has been a general authority of the church since 2008. Stevenson was appointed to the Quorum of the Twelve Apostles in October 2015. Currently, he is the ninth most senior apostle in the church.

== Early life, education, and career ==
Stevenson was born in Ogden, Utah, and was raised primarily in the state's Cache Valley area. He was a missionary for the church in the Japan Fukuoka Mission in the mid-1970s. He then attended Utah State University (USU), graduating in 1977 with a bachelor's degree in business administration.

In 1977, while a student at USU, Stevenson co-founded the exercise equipment company ICON Health & Fitness (now iFIT Health & Fitness). He served as the president and chief operating officer of the company. By the 1990s, ICON had become a major American manufacturer and marketer of fitness equipment, with well-known product lines such as NordicTrack and ProForm. Stevenson resigned from the company in 2008 upon his calling as an LDS general authority. He has also served on the Marriott School of Management National Advisory Council and the Utah State University Foundation Board.

== Church service ==
Within the church, Stevenson has served as a bishop and a counselor in a stake presidency. He served as president of the Japan Nagoya Mission from 2004 to 2007.

Stevenson became a member of the church's First Quorum of the Seventy at the April 2008 general conference. During his time in the Seventy, Stevenson served both as a counselor and as president of the church's Asia North Area, based in Tokyo, Japan. On March 31, 2012, he was released from the First Quorum of the Seventy and sustained as the church's Presiding Bishop. Stevenson was released as presiding bishop six days after he was sustained to the Quorum of the Twelve and was succeeded by Gérald Caussé.

In October 2015, he was sustained as an apostle and member of the Quorum of the Twelve. As an apostle, he is accepted by the church as a prophet, seer and revelator. He was sustained to the Quorum of the Twelve along with Ronald A. Rasband and Dale G. Renlund, filling vacancies created by the 2015 deaths of L. Tom Perry, Boyd K. Packer and Richard G. Scott. This was the first time since 1906 that three new apostles were sustained. They are the 98th, 99th, and 100th members of the Quorum of the Twelve Apostles in the church's history.

== Personal life ==
Stevenson married Lesa Jean Higley in the Idaho Falls Idaho Temple, and they have four sons. He met his wife while attending USU.

== Honors ==
Date	School/Institution	Degree
2023	Utah State University	Honorary Doctorate of Business

The Church of Jesus Christ of Latter-day Saints titles
Preceded by Ronald A. Rasband	Quorum of the Twelve Apostles; October 3, 2015 –	Succeeded by Dale G. Renlund
Preceded by H. David Burton	Presiding Bishop; March 31, 2012 – October 9, 2015	Succeeded by Gérald Caussé
