= Living Christ Church =

Living Christ Church (Sinhala: ජීවමාන ක්‍රිස්තු සභාව Vamana Kristhu Sabhava, Tamil: ஜீவனுள்ள கிறிஸ்துவின் சபை), Sri Lanka is an autonomous indigenous fellowship of churches, established in 1992 under Lanka Evangelical Society. The mission of the Church is for the sole purpose of planting churches both in Sri Lanka and abroad.

== History ==
Living Christ Church started as a prayer group of like minded Christians in 1992. They organized themselves as a youth prayer group to pray for the evangelism and church planting initiatives in the war-torn north and east. It was a great need at that time, because of the evangelists and church workers were reluctant to go to northern part of Sri Lanka. Each week they prayed earnestly that God would send workers to minister in those difficult areas, never knowing, that God's intention was to send few of them for such task.

In 1993, two of the group members went to Mannar Island for an evangelism trip. The following day, LTTE (Liberation Tigers of Tamil Eelam) bombed the ferry-port and they were trapped for nearly two months without any communication with Colombo. At that difficult moment, they prayed and decided to share the gospel with people around the Island. The two member evangelistic group managed to plant two viable church plants and establish two preaching points in the Island.

After their arrival, they shared their experiences, God's provision and enablement. Positive experience and God's guidance led them to start another new work in Northeast. In the latter part of 1993, few of the team went to Vavuniya to pioneer new evangelistic work. They were successful to start a church plant, now a full-fledged Church named Jesus Saves Church in Vauniya.

In 1994, group change their name to "Lanka Evangelical Society" and start to plant churches and train leaders to undertake those churches. Further, the society determined that the congregations have the discretion to remain in voluntary fellowship with the society or to become autonomous and independent. Due to new security regulations implemented in 1998, it was difficult to continue work in Vavuniya and the Evangelists decided to return to Colombo. Somewhere in the same year, the first church plant, Jesus Saves Church determined to detach from the society and to affiliate with a foreign church entity for much need financial support.

From 1998 onwards Lanka Evangelical Society started work in the western and central part of Sri Lanka and successful in planting two churches in Kirulapone and Wattala.

In 2005, Lanka Evangelical Society established the ecclesiastical body named "Living Christ Church" vested under Non-Episcopalian Churches Ordinance, to provide a working fellowship for all associated churches of the Society.

In 2005, Lanka Evangelical Society transferred its vested-rights to the General Synod of the Living Christ Church.

== Ecclesiastical Polity ==
The governing polity has risen out of practical necessities and not from any existing ecclesiastical model.

The nature of the church is Presbyterian in its governance, emphasizing the plurality of leadership and freedom of conscience.

Primarily the constitution and cannons of the church has articulated to incorporate different parishes into one church. The parishes are represented by ruling and teaching elders and the business of the whole church is deliberated at the annual assembly named for that purpose as General Synod. This is the ultimate authority for the church. The synod meets annually on the first Monday of December. In between two Synods, Executive committee acts as the representative authority of the Synod and accountable of all its actions to the successive Synod.

== See also ==
- Christianity in Sri Lanka
- Religion in Sri Lanka
- Roman Catholicism in Sri Lanka
