= Richard G. Scott =

American religious leader (1928–2015)

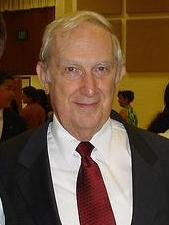
- Scott in 2007

Quorum of the Twelve Apostles
- October 1, 1988 – September 22, 2015
- Called by: Ezra Taft Benson

LDS Church Apostle
- October 6, 1988 – September 22, 2015
- Called by: Ezra Taft Benson
- Reason: Death of Marion G. Romney
- Reorganization at end of term: Ronald A. Rasband, Gary E. Stevenson, and Dale G. Renlund were ordained following deaths of Scott, L. Tom Perry, and Boyd K. Packer

Presidency of the First Quorum of the Seventy
- October 1, 1983 – October 1, 1988
- Called by: Spencer W. Kimball
- End reason: Called to the Quorum of the Twelve Apostles

First Quorum of the Seventy
- April 2, 1977 – October 1, 1988
- Called by: Spencer W. Kimball
- End reason: Called to the Quorum of the Twelve Apostles

Personal details
- Born: Richard Gordon Scott; November 7, 1928; Pocatello, Idaho, U.S.
- Died: September 22, 2015 (aged 86); Salt Lake City, Utah, U.S.
- Education: George Washington University
- Spouse(s): Jeanene Watkins (d. 1995)
- Children: 7
- Signature

Richard Gordon Scott (November 7, 1928 – September 22, 2015) was an American scientist and religious leader who served as a member of the Quorum of the Twelve Apostles of the Church of Jesus Christ of Latter-day Saints (LDS Church).

Scott was born in Idaho in 1928 and grew up in Washington, D.C. He attended George Washington University as an undergraduate, graduating in 1950 with a B.S. degree in mechanical engineering. He then served a full-time LDS mission in Uruguay from 1950 to 1953, achieving fluency in Spanish. Upon his return in 1953, Scott married Jeanene Watkins, his college girlfriend and the daughter of U.S. Senator Arthur Watkins, and began working as a nuclear engineer for Naval Reactors under the leadership of Admiral Hyman Rickover. Scott worked for the U.S. government until 1965, when the LDS Church selected him to serve as a mission president in Argentina. He completed his service in 1968 and returned to Washington, D.C., where he worked for a private nuclear engineering consulting firm. Scott's scientific career ended in 1977 when the LDS Church called him to serve as a general authority. Following the death of Marion G. Romney in 1988, Scott was chosen to fill the subsequent vacancy in the Quorum of the Twelve Apostles, and served in that position until his death in 2015.

== Background and education ==
Scott was born in Pocatello, Idaho, to Kenneth Leroy Scott and Mary Eliza Whittle. When he was five years old, the family moved to Washington, D.C., where his father worked in the U.S. Department of Agriculture. His father was not a member of the LDS Church at the time, and his mother was marginally active, until the U.S. Secretary of Agriculture in the Eisenhower administration, church apostle Ezra Taft Benson, named Kenneth Scott as Assistant Secretary of Agriculture. Benson's influence led to his father's conversion and the reactivation of his mother. In 1988, as church president, Benson appointed Richard as a church apostle.

Encouraged by his bishop and home teachers, Scott had attended church sporadically at times during his youth but felt out of place. He lacked confidence socially and athletically at school, although he excelled academically, was a class president, played the clarinet in the band, and was a drum major in the marching band.

During his high school summers, Scott worked various jobs to earn money for college. Working on an oyster boat off the coast of Long Island, New York, during one summer, the hardened fishermen mocked him for not drinking alcohol. When a man went overboard and 17-year-old "Scotty" was the only sober man on board, he was sent overboard to look for him. In other summers, Scott cut down trees in Utah for the forest service and repaired railroad cars; he also worked as a dishwasher and assistant cook for a logging company in Utah.

Scott graduated from George Washington University with a Bachelor of Science in Mechanical Engineering. At the time, he was dating Jeanene Watkins, the daughter of U.S. Senator Arthur V. Watkins. When she categorically stated that she would only marry a returned missionary in an LDS temple, Scott's career plans changed and he applied for missionary service. He was called to serve in the Uruguay Montevideo Mission. It was during his missionary service that Scott was able to fill "all the voids of loneliness" he had felt since his youth. Jeanene graduated in sociology and left the day after graduation for a mission to the northwestern United States. After they both completed their missionary service, they married in the Manti Temple on July 16, 1953.

The Scotts had seven children, five of whom reached adulthood. Their first son died after an operation to correct a congenital heart condition. Their second daughter lived only minutes and died six weeks before the death of their first son. Jeanene Watkins Scott died on May 15, 1995, after a short battle with cancer.

== Career ==
A few weeks after returning from Uruguay, Scott was interviewed by Hyman G. Rickover, "father of the nuclear Navy". The interview seemed to go poorly since, when Scott mentioned his recent missionary service, the volatile Captain snapped, "and what do I care about your mission?" When asked what was the last book he read, Scott had to answer truthfully that it was the Book of Mormon. When all seemed lost to Scott, he stood to leave, but Rickover told him to wait, saying that he had only been testing his confidence and whether he would be true to what he believed, since this would be a difficult project. Scott was then offered the job working on the design of the nuclear reactor for the Nautilus, the first nuclear-powered submarine of the U.S. Navy. While working for Naval Reactors, Scott reported to Harry Mandil, reactor engineering branch director and became one of Mandil's key reactor material engineers. Scott later completed what was an equivalent to a doctorate in nuclear engineering at the Oak Ridge National Laboratory in Tennessee, but due to the classified nature of the work, a formal university degree was not awarded. He also worked on the development of the Shippingport Atomic Power Station—the first commercial land-based nuclear power plant. He worked with Rickover until 1965 when he and his family moved to Córdoba, Argentina, when he was called as president of the church's Argentina North Mission. One of his missionaries was D. Todd Christofferson, who would later be called to serve in the Quorum of the Twelve with Scott.

After his return from Argentina, Scott joined other former Rickover staffers at a private consulting firm specializing in nuclear engineering, working out of Washington, D.C. He worked there until his call as a church general authority in 1977.

== LDS Church service ==
Scott served in the LDS Church in many capacities. His ability to speak Spanish aided him in many assignments. Apart from his 31-month mission to Uruguay, he served as a stake clerk and as a counselor in a stake presidency before his service as a mission president. He served as a regional representative in the Uruguay, Paraguay, North Carolina, South Carolina, Virginia, and Washington, D.C. areas. He was called as a general authority and member of the First Quorum of the Seventy in April 1977. In 1983, he was called to the Presidency of the Seventy.

As a seventy, Scott served as managing director of the Genealogical Department and Executive Administrator of the church for Southern Mexico and Central America.

On October 1, 1988, Scott was called to serve in the Quorum of the Twelve Apostles, filling the vacancy created by the death of quorum president Marion G. Romney. As a member of the Quorum of the Twelve, Scott was accepted by the church as a prophet, seer, and revelator.

After not speaking in the church's general conference earlier in the month, on April 23, 2015, Scott was hospitalized with gastrointestinal bleeding. The bleeding was brought under control within the next 24 hours, and he was released from the hospital on April 28. The bleeding was later determined to have been caused by an ulcer. The church reported that "Elder Scott, known for his gentle manner and devoted service, has experienced a fading memory incident to age, and is not fully able to participate in meetings of the Quorum of the Twelve at this time. Doctors consider his condition as stable."

Scott died on September 22, 2015, at age 86, due to causes incident to age. His death meant that there were three vacancies in the Quorum of the Twelve apostles. With the death of fellow apostles L. Tom Perry and Boyd K. Packer in the previous months, there had not been so many vacancies in the Quorum since 1906. The vacancies were filled in the next general conference in October.

== Writings ==
Scott was a regular speaker at Church Educational System firesides and at the church's general conferences. In these settings he was known "for delivering compassionate talks ... looking directly into the camera, and pleading for repentance and improvements in the lives of members. He emphasizes the Savior's compassion and willingness to forgive past transgressions, and pleads for members to repent and move on with their lives."

In 2007, Scott wrote Finding Peace, Happiness and Joy, his first book written as an apostle. It carries on many themes from his talks such as repentance and finding happiness through the atonement of Jesus Christ.

Some of the addresses he has delivered in general conferences include:

- "To Heal the Shattering Consequences of Abuse", April 2008 General Conference
- "Truth, the Foundation of Correct Decisions", October 2007 General Conference
- "Jesus Christ, Our Redeemer", April 1997 General Conference

The Church of Jesus Christ of Latter-day Saints titles
Preceded by Joseph B. Wirthlin	Quorum of the Twelve Apostles; October 1, 1988 – September 22, 2015	Succeeded by Robert D. Hales
