= L. Tom Perry =

American religious leader

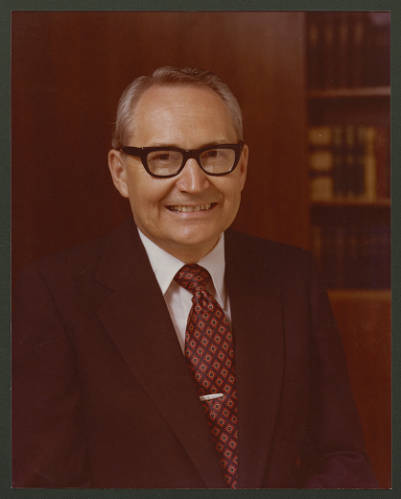

Quorum of the Twelve Apostles
- April 6, 1974 – May 30, 2015
- Called by: Spencer W. Kimball

LDS Church Apostle
- April 11, 1974 – May 30, 2015
- Called by: Spencer W. Kimball
- Reason: Death of Harold B. Lee and reorganization of First Presidency
- Reorganization at end of term: Ronald A. Rasband, Gary E. Stevenson, and Dale G. Renlund were ordained following deaths of Perry, Boyd K. Packer, and Richard G. Scott

Assistant to the Quorum of the Twelve Apostles
- October 6, 1972 – April 6, 1974
- Called by: Harold B. Lee
- End reason: Called to the Quorum of the Twelve Apostles

Military career
- 1944–1946
- Service/branch: United States Marine Corps
- Battles/wars: World War II

Personal details
- Born: Lowell Tom Perry; August 5, 1922; Logan, Utah, United States
- Died: May 30, 2015 (aged 92); Salt Lake City, Utah
- Resting place: Salt Lake City Cemetery; 40.7745°N 111.8635°W
- Alma mater: Utah State University (B.S.)
- Spouse(s): Virginia Lee (1947–1974; deceased); Barbara Dayton (1976–2015)
- Children: 3 (including Lee Tom Perry)
- Signature
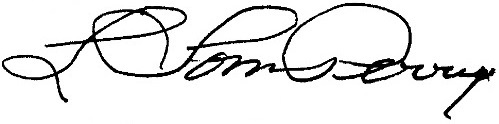

Lowell Tom Perry (August 5, 1922 – May 30, 2015) was an American businessman and religious leader who was a member of the Quorum of the Twelve Apostles of the Church of Jesus Christ of Latter-day Saints (LDS Church) from 1974 until his death.

== Early life ==
Perry was born in Logan, Utah, to Leslie Thomas Perry and his wife, Elsie Nora Sonne. Perry, Utah is named for Perry's ancestor, Gustavus Adolphus Perry and his family, who were among the first settlers in that area.

From the time of Perry's birth until he was eighteen, his father was bishop of their LDS ward in Logan. From 1942 to 1944, Perry served as an LDS missionary in the Northern States Mission, headquartered in Chicago. He spent about 10 months in Marion, Ohio, where he was instrumental in forming a branch in that city. He also served for part of his mission based in Cedar Rapids, Iowa. After returning from his mission he joined the United States Marine Corps and was assigned to the 2nd Marine Division. While in training Perry attended church and activities at the Adams Ward in Los Angeles.

Perry was then part of the American forces that landed on Saipan, and remained there for about a year. While there he participated in the construction of an LDS chapel on the island. He was among the United States troops sent to occupy Japan after the war. While in Nagasaki, Perry coordinated a group of Marines to help rebuild a local Protestant church.

== Education ==
Perry graduated from the Utah State Agricultural College (now Utah State University (USU)) in 1949 with a bachelor's degree in finance.

While he was a student at USU, Perry served as president of the university's Associated Students.

== Employment ==
Perry's first job out of college was working as administrative assistant working for the USU Extension Service. He also took graduate courses in finance during this time.

In 1950, before his second child was born, Perry took a Christmas retail season job with C.C. Anderson's (CCA) Department Store in Logan, Utah. CCA was a division of Allied Stores.

In early 1951, Perry took a job with CCA at its corporate headquarters in Boise, Idaho. Later in 1951, CCA decided to appoint controllers in each of their stores. Perry was appointed as controller for the Lewiston, Idaho store. When he first took this position he lived in Lewiston, but later moved to Clarkston, Washington.

He was later involved in business jobs that took him to Washington, California, New York, and Massachusetts.

Perry was in the retail business during his time in Boston, Massachusetts. He became a fan of the Boston Red Sox and threw out the first pitch at a Red Sox game on May 8, 2004.

== Early church service ==
In addition to his mission to the Northern States, Perry served as an LDS group leader while on Saipan. He oversaw more convert baptisms in this position than while on his mission.

He also served in the LDS Church as an early-morning seminary teacher, as a counselor in a bishopric, high councilor, counselor in a stake presidency, and as president of the church's Boston Massachusetts Stake.

In early 1963, after moving to Scarsdale, New York, Perry was called simultaneously as a member of the New York Stake's high council, stake mission president, and special assistant to the president of the church's Eastern States Mission. In these assignments, he worked with Bernard P. Brockbank and Wilburn C. West in overseeing the creation and implementation of the LDS Church's pavilion at the 1964 New York World's Fair.

== General authority ==
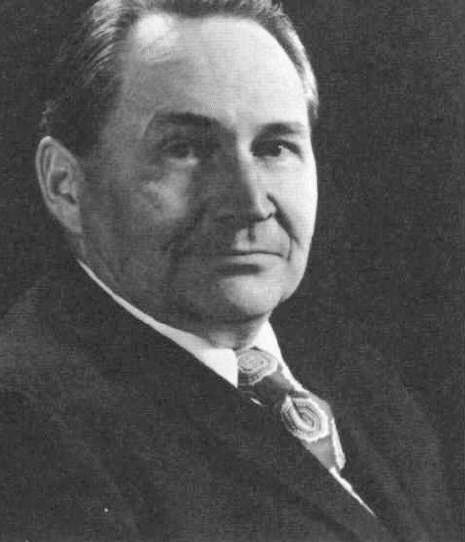
Soon after his call to the Quorum of the Twelve (c. 1975)

Perry was called as a general authority and Assistant to the Quorum of the Twelve Apostles in 1972. The death of church president Harold B. Lee created a vacancy in the Quorum of the Twelve when Spencer W. Kimball, who had been serving as quorum president, became church president. Perry was sustained as a member of the Twelve on April 6, 1974, and was ordained an apostle on April 11, 1974.

In 2004, Perry was asked by church president Gordon B. Hinckley to serve as president of the church's Europe Central Area, headquartered in Frankfurt, Germany. This was a position normally held by a member of the seventy. This made Perry one of the most senior officials of the church ever to be stationed away from Salt Lake City. While serving in this capacity, Perry initiated a more proactive institute program that emphasized meeting the social and intellectual needs of young single adult church members. In 2015, he met with Barack Obama and other LDS Church leaders at a meeting in Salt Lake City, Utah.

== Family ==
Perry married Virginia C. Lee in the Logan Temple on July 18, 1947. They had three children together. Perry's son, Lee Tom Perry, is an academic and was dean of the Marriott School of Business at Brigham Young University from 1998 to 2005. Virginia Perry died of cancer in December 1974. Their daughter, Barbara, died of cancer in 1983.

In 1976, Perry married Barbara Dayton.

== Death ==
In April 2015, Perry was diagnosed with thyroid cancer. In May 2015, the church reported the aggressive cancer had spread and Perry died the following day, on May 30, 2015. At the time of his death, he was the third most senior and oldest living apostle in the church. His funeral was held on June 5, 2015. Perry was buried in the Salt Lake City Cemetery, next to his first wife, Virginia and his daughter, Barbara.

== Works ==
Books

- Perry, L. Tom (2011), Family ties: a message for fathers, Deseret Book, ISBN 978-1-60908-768-5, OCLC 710044911
- —— (1996), Living with enthusiasm, Deseret Book, ISBN 978-1-57345-136-9, OCLC 34115910

== Honors ==
- Humanitarian Award for Service to Others (2014) – Catholic Community Services of Utah (L. Tom and Barbara Perry)

== Gallery ==
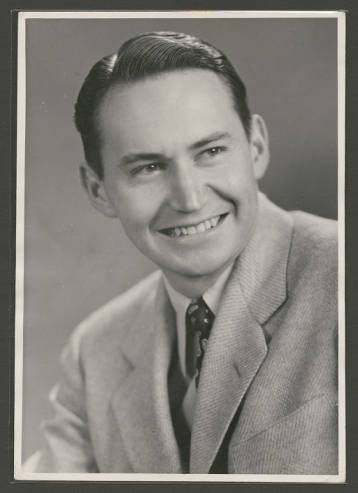
Black and white Utah State University yearbook photograph of L. Tom Perry. Image dates from 1947.

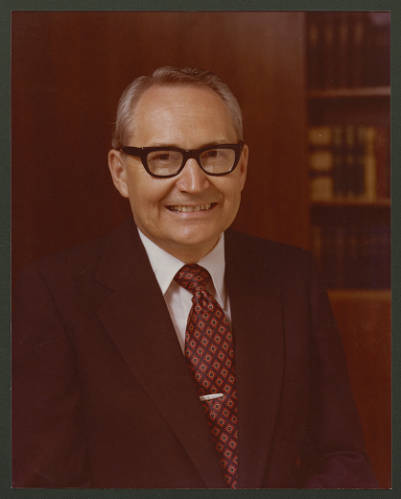
Photo of L. Tom Perry. Date unidentified.

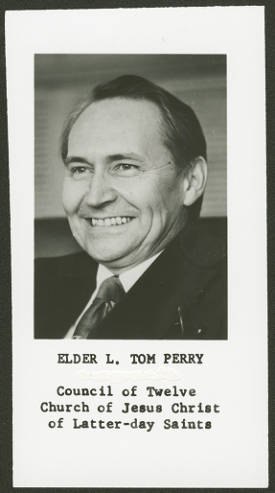
Black and white photo of L. Tom Perry from around 1980.

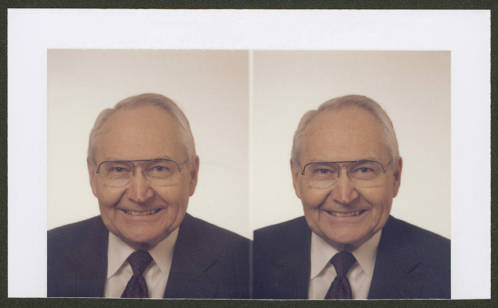
Two color photographs of L. Tom Perry from around 2000.

== See also ==
- Council on the Disposition of the Tithes

== Notes ==
The Church of Jesus Christ of Latter-day Saints titles
Preceded by Bruce R. McConkie	Quorum of the Twelve Apostles; April 11, 1974 – May 30, 2015	Succeeded by David B. Haight
