= Boyd K. Packer =

American religious leader (1924–2015)

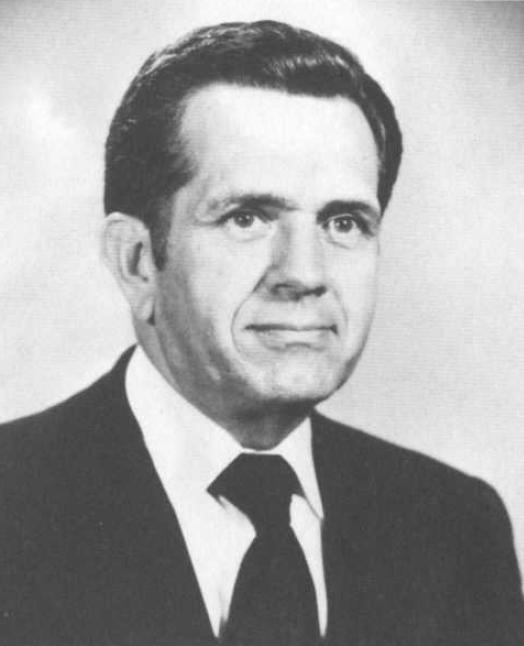

President of the Quorum of the Twelve Apostles
- February 3, 2008 – July 3, 2015
- Predecessor: Thomas S. Monson
- Successor: Russell M. Nelson

Acting President of the Quorum of the Twelve Apostles
- June 5, 1994 – January 27, 2008
- End reason: Became President of the Quorum of the Twelve Apostles

Quorum of the Twelve Apostles
- April 6, 1970 – July 3, 2015
- Called by: Joseph Fielding Smith

LDS Church Apostle
- April 9, 1970 – July 3, 2015
- Called by: Joseph Fielding Smith
- Reason: Death of David O. McKay and reorganization of First Presidency
- Reorganization at end of term: Ronald A. Rasband, Gary E. Stevenson, and Dale G. Renlund were ordained following deaths of Packer, L. Tom Perry, and Richard G. Scott

Assistant to the Quorum of the Twelve Apostles
- September 30, 1961 – April 6, 1970
- Called by: David O. McKay
- End reason: Called to the Quorum of the Twelve Apostles

Military career
- 1942–1946
- Service/branch: United States Army
- Unit: United States Army Air Forces
- Battles/wars: World War II

Personal details
- Born: Boyd Kenneth Packer; September 10, 1924; Brigham City, Utah, United States
- Died: July 3, 2015 (aged 90); Cottonwood Heights, Utah, United States
- Alma mater: Utah State University (BS, MS); Brigham Young University (EdD)
- Spouse(s): Donna Smith (m. 1947)
- Children: 10
- Parents: Ira W. and Emma Packer
- Signature
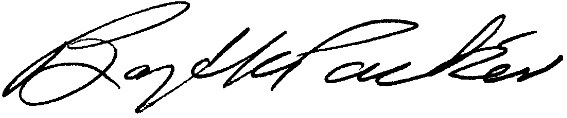

Boyd Kenneth Packer (September 10, 1924 – July 3, 2015) was an American religious leader and educator who served as president of the Quorum of the Twelve Apostles of the Church of Jesus Christ of Latter-day Saints (LDS Church) from 2008 until his death. He also served as the quorum's acting president from 1994 to 2008 and was an apostle and member of the Quorum of the Twelve from 1970 until his death. He served as a general authority of the church from 1961 until his death.

== Early life and education ==
Packer was born on September 10, 1924, in Brigham City, Utah, the tenth of eleven children born to Ira Wight Packer and Emma Jensen. As a young boy, he contracted polio. After graduating from high school, he enlisted in the United States Army Air Forces in the spring of 1943. He graduated as a pilot in September 1944 and was assigned to bomber training. He was on Okinawa when World War II ended, and his unit remained stationed on Japan until 1946. After leaving the military, Packer initially attended Weber College (now Weber State University), where he met his future wife, Donna Smith (1927-2022). They married in the Logan Temple in 1947 and had ten children, including emeritus LDS general authority Allan F. Packer. After their marriage, Packer attended Utah State University, earning a B.S. degree in 1949 and an M.S. degree in 1953. He later earned an Ed.D. from Brigham Young University (BYU) in 1962. Packer was also an artist and enjoyed painting birds. In 2014, BYU's Monte L. Bean Life Science Museum installed an exhibit featuring many of Packer's paintings and sculptures.

== Career ==
=== LDS Church employment and service ===
In his career as an educator, Packer worked for the Church Educational System, where he held various administrative positions overseeing seminary and institute programs, including as assistant supervisor of the church's Native American seminary programs, general assistant administrator of seminaries and institutes, and later as supervisor of church's seminaries and institutes. Packer served a four-year term on the Brigham City City Council.

In 1961, Packer was called by LDS Church president David O. McKay to serve as a general authority as an Assistant to the Twelve (a position that no longer exists). While serving in the position, Packer was assigned to serve as president of the church's New England States Mission. He also served for a time as the managing director of the church's military relations committee.

Following McKay's death in January 1970, Packer, then 45 years old, was called by new church president Joseph Fielding Smith as a member of the Quorum of the Twelve Apostles at the church's April 1970 general conference. Between 1979 and 1981, he was on the committee that produced the new editions of the LDS Church scriptures. On September 12, 1991, Packer dedicated Ukraine "for the preaching of the restored gospel." In 1993, Packer read the dedicatory prayer in Spanish at the dedication of the San Diego California Temple.

When Howard W. Hunter, who had been president of the Quorum of the Twelve Apostles, succeeded to the presidency of the church in 1994, he called Gordon B. Hinckley and Thomas S. Monson as his counselors in the First Presidency. Packer was the fourth apostle in seniority among the ranks of the church, behind Hunter, Hinckley, and Monson. This created a situation where the only apostles senior to Packer were members of the First Presidency. As a result, Packer was named acting president of the Quorum of the Twelve. When Hunter died in 1995 and was succeeded by Hinckley, Monson was again retained in the First Presidency and Packer was again asked to be acting president of the Twelve. Of the six acting presidents of the Quorum in the church's history, Packer served the longest in that capacity and is the only one to serve under two different church presidents.

In 1999, Packer dedicated the Regina Saskatchewan Temple. Packer became president of the Quorum of the Twelve on February 3, 2008, when Monson became church president. In 2012, Packer dedicated the Brigham City Utah Temple.

=== Teachings and legacy ===
Packer was well known for several talks and teachings, and several of his stories have been adapted into short films. His sermon about singing a hymn to drive off bad thoughts was adapted into the video Worthy Thoughts. His "parable of the mediator" (Jesus Christ) was adapted into the short film The Mediator. "The Candle of the Lord" (1982) contained an analogy of trying to describe what salt tastes like to trying to describe what promptings from the Holy Ghost are like. Packer also taught the importance of following the rule before the exception and of hymn-centered prelude music for worship services.

Packer blamed “immorality” in the United States for its loss in the Vietnam War. Items he cited as immoral included “unmarried couples, abortion, the elimination of prayer from public life, addictive drugs, and the placing of the collective rights of the majority in subjugation to any citizen’s individual rights.”

Packer served as an advisor to the Genesis Group, a social organization of the LDS Church for African American members and their families, and was also active in obtaining genealogical records on microfilm for the church through its Genealogical Society of Utah. In 1977, Packer was a key figure in getting Native American-related records filmed from the federal records centers in Los Angeles, Fort Worth, Seattle, and Kansas City. He was involved in negotiations that same year with archivists and scholars at Jerusalem to microfilm Jewish records.

=== Controversy ===
In a general conference priesthood session in October 1976, Packer gave a sermon entitled "To Young Men Only", in which he discouraged boys of the Young Men organization in the Aaronic priesthood from pursuing activities which the LDS Church defines as immoral, including masturbation, the use of pornography, and homosexual activities. The sermon has been criticized for encouraging homophobia and gay bashing. Packer also addressed homosexuality in a 1978 speech, "To the One", directed to "those few, those very few, who may be subject to homosexual temptation"; and comments during his October 2010 general conference address, "Cleansing the Inner Vessel", were interpreted as pertaining to homosexuality and generated a petition by the Human Rights Campaign. The church responded to this petition by reaffirming its doctrinal position on marriage while reiterating the universal need to follow "Jesus Christ's second great commandment—to love one another." Following the conference, Packer altered the published text of the sermon to "clarif[y] his intent." In 2013, amid a nationwide shift toward acceptance and legalization of same-sex marriage, Packer attracted some attention for comments critical of "legalized acts of immorality" and warning of a "tolerance trap."

In 1981, Packer advocated that Latter-day Saint historians and educators use discretion in discussing history that does not promote faith. In a speech to educators in the LDS Church Educational System, he cautioned, "There is a temptation for the writer or teacher of Church history to want to tell everything, whether it is worthy or faith-promoting or not. Some things that are true are not very useful." Teaching that teachers should "give milk before meat", he stated that "Teaching some things that are true, prematurely or at the wrong time, can invite sorrow and heartbreak instead of the joy intended to accompany learning.… [S]ome things are to be taught selectively and some things are to be given only to those who are worthy." Packer's opinion applied to all historians who were members of the LDS Church:

That historian or scholar who delights in pointing out the weakness and frailties of present or past leaders destroys faith. A destroyer of faith—particularly one within the Church, and more particularly one who is employed specifically to build faith—places himself in great spiritual jeopardy. He is serving the wrong master, and unless he repents, he will not be among the faithful in the eternities.
One who chooses to follow the tenets of his profession, regardless of how they may injure the Church or destroy the faith of those not ready for "advanced history", is himself in spiritual jeopardy. If that one is a member of the Church, he has broken his covenants and will be held accountable.

Packer's comments raised criticism by some prominent Mormon and non-Mormon scholars. Soon after Packer's 1981 speech, Mormon historian D. Michael Quinn gave a speech highly critical of Packer's views, and suggested that a historian who followed Packer's advice would sacrifice their honesty and professional integrity. Quinn also discussed what he viewed as a Mormon tradition of portraying LDS leaders as infallible people. C. Robert Mesle has criticized Packer as having created a false dichotomy "between the integrity of faith and the integrity of inquiry."

== Recognition ==
In May 2013, Weber State University, where Packer received an associate degree in 1948 and where he met his wife, designated a public service center for families the "Boyd K. and Donna Smith Packer Family and Community Education Center". Packer was also interviewed by PBS for its documentary on the LDS Church titled The Mormons.

== Death ==
Packer died at his home on July 3, 2015. At the time of his death, he was the second-most senior apostle among the ranks of the church and the fifth-longest serving general authority in the church's history. His funeral was held on July 10, 2015, and he was buried in Brigham City.

== Selected works ==
- Packer, Boyd K. (1962), Manual of Policies and Procedures for the Administration of Indian Seminaries of The Church of Jesus Christ of Latter-day Saints, Field Project (Ed.D.), Provo, Utah: Department of Education, Brigham Young University, OCLC 22009489
- —— (1963), Eternal Love, Salt Lake City, Utah: Deseret Book, ASIN B01N7X28VY
- —— (1975), Teach Ye Diligently, Salt Lake City, Utah: Deseret Book, ISBN 978-0-87747-558-3
- —— (1977), Mothers, booklet, Salt Lake City, Utah: Deseret Book, OCLC 19655993
- —— (1978). To The One. LDS Church – via Internet Archive.
- —— (1980), To Young Men Only, pamphlet, Salt Lake City, Utah: The Church of Jesus Christ of Latter-day Saints, OCLC 20473672
- —— (1980), The Holy Temple, Salt Lake City, Utah: Bookcraft, ISBN 978-0-88494-411-9
- —— (1982), That All May Be Edified: Talks, Sermons & Commentary, Salt Lake City, Utah: Bookcraft, ISBN 978-0-88494-473-7
- —— (1984), Our Father's Plan, Salt Lake City, Utah: Deseret Book, ISBN 978-0-87747-523-1
- —— (1986), A Christmas Parable, booklet, Salt Lake City, Utah: Bookcraft, ISBN 978-0-88494-605-2
- —— (1990), The Mediator, Salt Lake City, Utah: Bookcraft, ISBN 978-0875790954
- —— (1991), Let Not Your Heart Be Troubled, Salt Lake City, Utah: Bookcraft, ISBN 978-0-88494-787-5
- —— (1996), The Things of the Soul, Salt Lake City, Utah: Bookcraft, ISBN 978-0-88494-951-0
- —— (1997), Memorable Stories and Parables, Salt Lake City, Utah: Bookcraft, ISBN 978-1-57008-336-5
- —— (1998), The Shield of Faith, Salt Lake City, Utah: Bookcraft, ISBN 978-1-57008-582-6
- —— (2000), Memorable Stories With a Message, Salt Lake City, Utah: Deseret Book, ISBN 978-1-57345-788-0
- —— (2008), Clyde J. Williams (ed.), Mine Errand from the Lord: Selections from the Sermons and Writings of Boyd K. Packer, Salt Lake City, Utah: Deseret Book, ISBN 978-1-60641-023-3
- —— (2014), Refuge From The Storm, Salt Lake City, Utah: Deseret Book, ISBN 978-1609079833

== Notes ==
The Church of Jesus Christ of Latter-day Saints titles
Preceded by Thomas S. Monson	President of the Quorum of the Twelve Apostles; February 3, 2008 – July 3, 2015	Succeeded by Russell M. Nelson
Preceded by Thomas S. Monson	Quorum of the Twelve Apostles; April 9, 1970 – July 3, 2015	Succeeded by Marvin J. Ashton
