= Dale G. Renlund =

American religious leader and physician

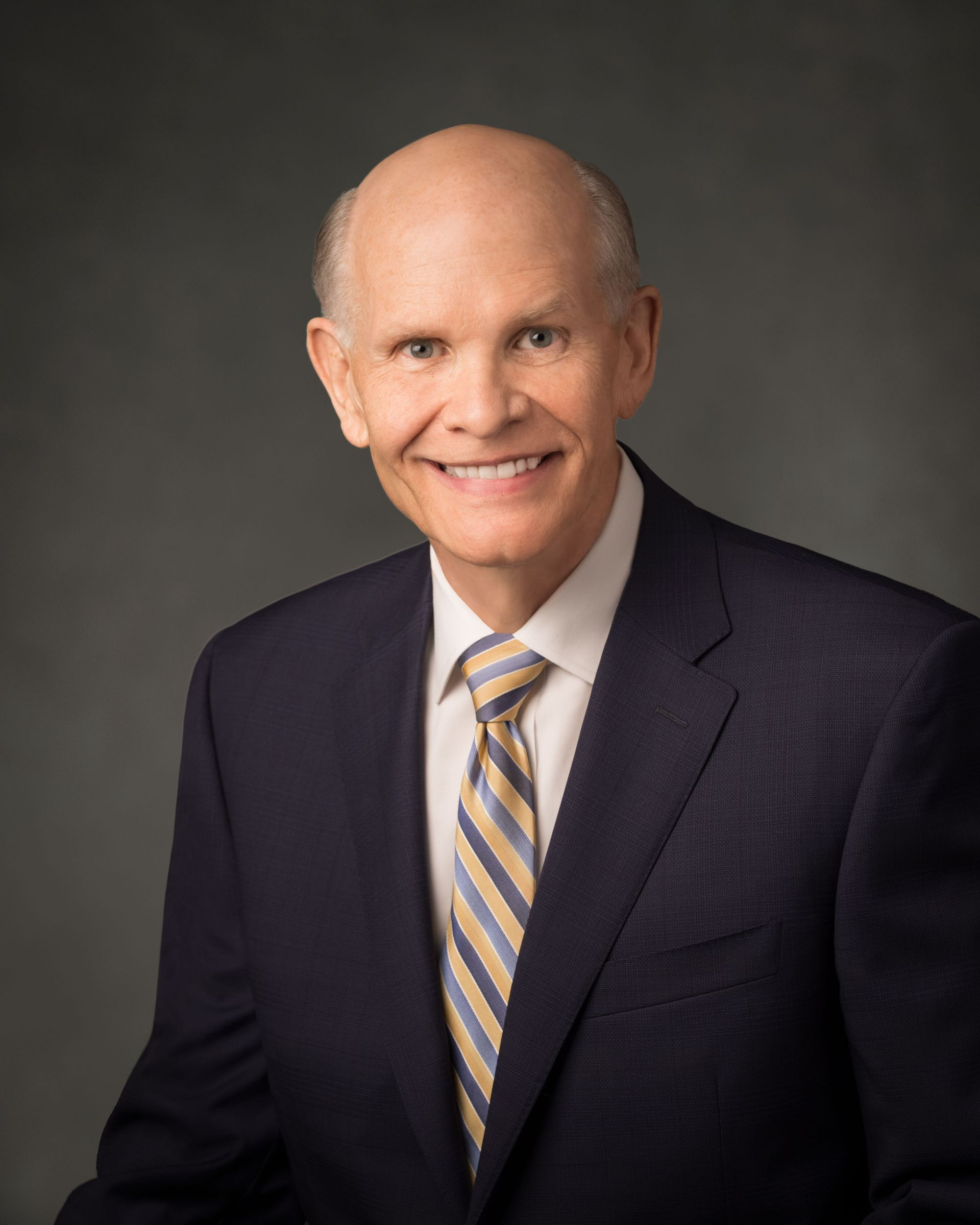

Quorum of the Twelve Apostles
- October 3, 2015

LDS Church Apostle
- October 8, 2015
- Reason: Death of Richard G. Scott

First Quorum of the Seventy
- April 4, 2009 – October 3, 2015
- End reason: Called to the Quorum of the Twelve Apostles

Personal details
- Born: Dale Gunnar Renlund; November 13, 1952 (age 73); Salt Lake City, Utah, United States
- Education: University of Utah (BS, MD)
- Spouse(s): Ruth Lybbert
- Children: 1

Dale Gunnar Renlund (born November 13, 1952) is an American religious leader and former cardiologist who serves in the Quorum of the Twelve Apostles of the Church of Jesus Christ of Latter-day Saints (LDS Church). He has been a general authority of the church since 2009. Currently, he is the tenth most senior apostle in the church.

== Early life ==
Renlund was born on November 13, 1952, in Salt Lake City, Utah, to Mats Åke Renlund and Mariana Andersson. Renlund's parents were from Finland and Sweden and immigrated to the United States so they could marry in an LDS Church temple. Since his parents did not yet know English, Renlund's first language was Swedish. For three years while he was a teenager, Renlund lived with his parents in Sweden where his father was a building missionary for the LDS Church. From 1972 to 1974 Renlund returned to Sweden where he served as a full-time missionary for the LDS Church.

== Medical career ==
Renlund graduated from the University of Utah in 1976 with a bachelor's degree in chemistry. He then attended the University of Utah School of Medicine, graduating in 1980 with a Doctor of Medicine. He then went on to do a three-year internal medicine residency program and then a three-year cardiology fellowship, both at Johns Hopkins School of Medicine. While working at Johns Hopkins, Renlund served as bishop of an LDS ward, and his wife, Ruth, earned a Juris Doctor degree from the University of Maryland Francis King Carey School of Law.

In 1986, Renlund became a professor of medicine at the University of Utah. As a cardiologist, he specialized in heart transplants. From 1991 to 2009, he was the medical director of the Utah Transplantation Affiliated Hospitals Cardiac Transplant Program. In 2000, he also became director of the Heart Failure Prevention and Treatment Program at Intermountain Health Center in Salt Lake City.

== LDS Church service ==
In addition to his time as a bishop, Renlund has served in many positions in the LDS Church, including ward Sunday School president and high councilor. In 1992, Renlund succeeded H. David Burton as president of the Salt Lake University 1st Stake. He served as an area seventy in the church's Utah Salt Lake City Area from 2000 to 2009.

In April 2009, Renlund became a member of the First Quorum of the Seventy, a full-time ecclesiastical position. Later in 2009, Renlund and his wife moved to Johannesburg, South Africa where he served first as a counselor and then from 2011 to 2014 as president of the church's Africa Southeast Area. In this position he oversaw the church in about 20 countries, making trips to many of them, including a total of nearly 40 trips to the Democratic Republic of the Congo.

In October 2015, he was sustained as an apostle and member of the Quorum of the Twelve. As an apostle, he is accepted by the church as a prophet, seer and revelator. He was sustained to the Quorum of the Twelve along with Ronald A. Rasband and Gary E. Stevenson, filling vacancies created by the 2015 deaths of L. Tom Perry, Boyd K. Packer and Richard G. Scott. This was the first time since 1906 that three new apostles were sustained. They are the 98th, 99th and 100th members of the Quorum of the Twelve Apostles in the church's history.

In June 2017, Renlund and his wife spoke at an international forum on religious freedom in Costa Rica and advocated, "Religious beliefs, teachings and practices bring needed medicine to a society that would otherwise be aggressive and sick." In June 2018, Renlund was featured in a series of suicide awareness videos published by the church. The series was aimed at understanding suicide and taking measures to prevent it. Renlund also spoke at a medical conference held in Vatican City in April 2018, describing the church's views on religion improving the health of individuals. In August 2017, Renlund participated in a "Face-to-Face" online event with youth members of the LDS Church in Africa.

In April 2019, Renlund dedicated the Kinshasa Democratic Republic of the Congo Temple.

== Personal life ==
Renlund married Ruth Lybbert in 1977. She is a daughter of Merlin R. Lybbert, who was a general authority of the LDS Church. The Renlunds are the parents of one daughter. Ruth Renlund was a personal injury trial lawyer and a partner of the law firm of Dewsnup, King & Olsen. Ruth Renlund is an ovarian cancer survivor.

== Works ==
=== Medical publications ===
- Stehlik, Josef; Islam, Nauman; Hurst, Denise; Kfoury, Abdallah G.; Movsesian, Matthew A.; Fuller, Ann; Delgado, Julio C.; Hammond, M. Elizabeth H.; Gilbert, Edward M.; Renlund, Dale G.; Bader, Feras; Fisher, Patrick W.; Bull, David A.; Singhal, Arun K.; Eckels, David D. (November 2009). "Utility of Virtual Crossmatch in Sensitized Patients Awaiting Heart Transplantation". The Journal of Heart and Lung Transplantation. 28 (11): 1129–1134. doi:10.1016/j.healun.2009.05.031. PMID 19782589.
- Russo, Mark J.; Gelijns, Annetine C.; Stevenson, Lynne W.; Sampat, Bhaven; Aaronson, Keith D.; Renlund, Dale G.; Ascheim, Deborah D.; Hong, Kimberly N.; Oz, Mehmet C.; Moskowitz, Alan J.; Rose, Eric A.; Miller, Leslie W. (October 2008). "The Cost of Medical Management in Advanced Heart Failure During the Final Two Years of Life". Journal of Cardiac Failure. 14 (8): 651–658. doi:10.1016/j.cardfail.2008.06.005. PMID 18926436.
- Everitt, Melanie D.; Donaldson, Amy E.; Casper, T. Charles; Stehlik, Josef; Hawkins, John A.; Tani, Lloyd Y.; Renlund, Dale G.; Kouretas, Peter C.; Kaza, Aditya K.; Bullock, Emily A.; Cardon, Michelle; Kfoury, Abdallah G. (December 2009). "Effect of ABO-Incompatible Listing on Infant Heart Transplant Waitlist Outcomes: Analysis of the United Network for Organ Sharing (UNOS) Database". The Journal of Heart and Lung Transplantation. 28 (12): 1254–1260. doi:10.1016/j.healun.2009.06.024. PMID 19782582.
- Drakos, Stavros G.; Kfoury, Abdallah G.; Kotter, John R.; Reid, Bruce B.; Clayson, Stephen E.; Selzman, Craig H.; Stehlik, Josef; Fisher, Patrick W.; Merida, Mario; Eckels, David D.; Brunisholz, Kim; Horne, Benjamin D.; Stoker, Sandi; Li, Dean Y.; Renlund, Dale G. (August 2009). "Prior Human Leukocyte Antigen-Allosensitization and Left Ventricular Assist Device Type Affect Degree of Post-implantation Human Leukocyte Antigen-Allosensitization". The Journal of Heart and Lung Transplantation. 28 (8): 838–842. doi:10.1016/j.healun.2009.04.031. PMC 2758491. PMID 19632582.
- Kfoury, Abdallah G.; Hammond, M. Elizabeth H.; Snow, Gregory L.; Drakos, Stavros G.; Stehlik, Josef; Fisher, Patrick W.; Reid, Bruce B.; Everitt, Melanie D.; Bader, Feras M.; Renlund, Dale G. (August 2009). "Cardiovascular Mortality Among Heart Transplant Recipients With Asymptomatic Antibody-Mediated or Stable Mixed Cellular and Antibody-Mediated Rejection". The Journal of Heart and Lung Transplantation. 28 (8): 781–784. doi:10.1016/j.healun.2009.04.035. PMID 19632573.
- Horne, Benjamin D.; May, Heidi T.; Muhlestein, Joseph B.; Ronnow, Brianna S.; Lappé, Donald L.; Renlund, Dale G.; Kfoury, Abdallah G.; Carlquist, John F.; Fisher, Patrick W.; Pearson, Robert R.; Bair, Tami L.; Anderson, Jeffrey L. (June 2009). "Exceptional Mortality Prediction by Risk Scores from Common Laboratory Tests". The American Journal of Medicine. 122 (6): 550–558. doi:10.1016/j.amjmed.2008.10.043. PMID 19486718.
- Bader, Feras M.; Rogers, R. Kevin; Kfoury, Abdallah G.; Gilbert, Edward M.; Horne, Ben D.; Stehlik, Josef; Renlund, Dale G. (March 2009). "Time-Dependent Changes in B-Type Natriuretic Peptide After Heart Transplantation: Correlation With Allograft Rejection and Function". Congestive Heart Failure. 15 (2): 63–67. doi:10.1111/j.1751-7133.2009.00055.x. PMID 19379451.
- May, Heidi T.; Horne, Benjamin D.; Ronnow, Brianna S.; Renlund, Dale G.; Muhlestein, Joseph B.; Lappé, Donald L.; Pearson, Robert R.; Carlquist, John F.; Kfoury, Abdallah G.; Bair, Tami L.; Rasmusson, Kismet D.; Anderson, Jeffrey L. (May 2009). "Superior predictive ability for death of a basic metabolic profile risk score". American Heart Journal. 157 (5): 946–954. doi:10.1016/j.ahj.2008.12.021. PMID 19376326.
- Horne, Benjamin D.; May, Heidi T.; Anderson, Jeffrey L.; Kfoury, Abdallah G.; Bailey, Beau M.; McClure, Brian S.; Renlund, Dale G.; Lappé, Donald L.; Carlquist, John F.; Fisher, Patrick W.; Pearson, Robert R.; Bair, Tami L.; Adams, Ted D.; Muhlestein, Joseph B. (April 2009). "Fasting and Other Health Influences". The American Journal of Cardiology. 103 (7): 1042. doi:10.1016/j.amjcard.2009.01.032. PMID 19327441.
- Stehlik, Josef; Nelson, Devin M.; Kfoury, Abdallah G.; Reid, Bruce B.; Clayson, Stephen E.; Nelson, Karl E.; Christensen, Brent J.; Renlund, Dale G.; Movsesian, Matthew A.; Cowley, Cris G.; Smith, Hildegard K.; Rasmusson, Brad Y.; Long, James W. (March 2009). "Outcome of Noncardiac Surgery in Patients With Ventricular Assist Devices". The American Journal of Cardiology. 103 (5): 709–712. doi:10.1016/j.amjcard.2008.11.021. PMID 19231338.
- Kfoury, Abdallah G.; Renlund, Dale G.; Snow, Gregory L.; Stehlik, Josef; Folsom, Jan W.; Fisher, Patrick W.; Reid, Bruce B.; Clayson, Stephen E.; Gilbert, Edward M.; Everitt, Melanie D.; Bader, Feras M.; Singhal, Arun K.; Hammond, M. Elizabeth H. (January 2009). "A Clinical Correlation Study of Severity of Antibody-mediated Rejection and Cardiovascular Mortality in Heart Transplantation". The Journal of Heart and Lung Transplantation. 28 (1): 51–57. doi:10.1016/j.healun.2008.09.012. PMID 19134531.

== See also ==
- Quentin L. Cook, "Elder Dale G. Renlund: An Obedient Servant", Liahona, July 2016
- "Dale Gunnar Renlund". Church News. May 9, 2009.
- Askar, J.G. (May 9, 2009). "Healing hands consecrated to the Lord's work". Church News.
- "Elder Dale G. Renlund," Liahona, May 2009, p. 136
- healthgrades report on Renlund

The Church of Jesus Christ of Latter-day Saints titles
Preceded by Gary E. Stevenson	Quorum of the Twelve Apostles; October 3, 2015 –	Succeeded by Gerrit W. Gong
