= Ronald A. Rasband =

American religious leader (born 1951)

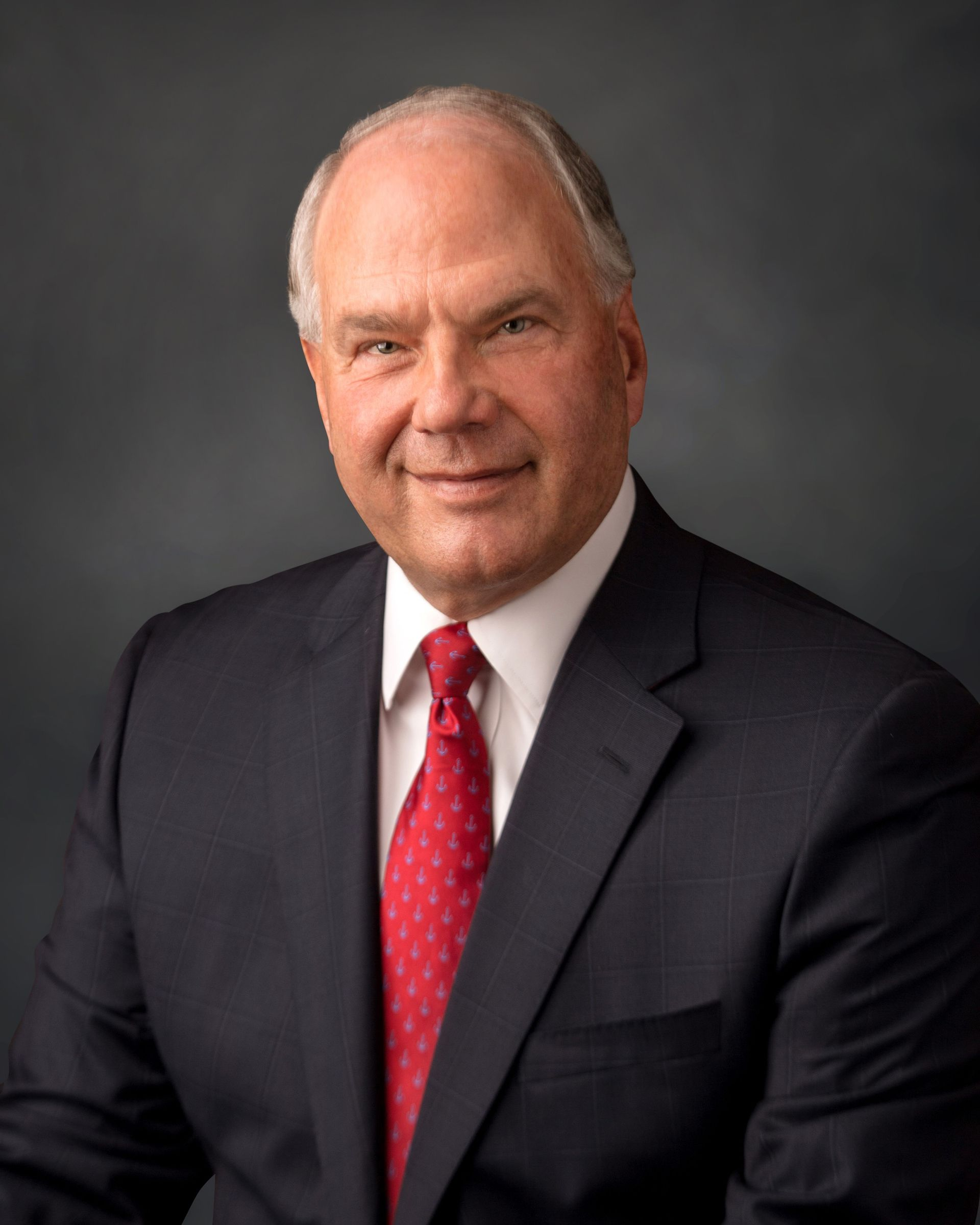
- Rasband in 2025

Quorum of the Twelve Apostles
- October 3, 2015

LDS Church Apostle
- October 8, 2015
- Reason: Death of L. Tom Perry

Presidency of the Seventy
- August 15, 2005 – October 3, 2015
- End reason: Called to the Quorum of the Twelve Apostles

First Quorum of the Seventy
- April 1, 2000 – October 3, 2015
- End reason: Called to the Quorum of the Twelve Apostles

Personal details
- Born: Ronald A Rasband; February 6, 1951 (age 75); Salt Lake City, Utah, United States
- Spouse(s): Melanie Twitchell
- Children: 5

Ronald Anderson Rasband (born February 6, 1951) is a member of the Quorum of the Twelve Apostles of the Church of Jesus Christ of Latter-day Saints (LDS Church). He has been a general authority of the church since 2000. Currently, he is the eighth most senior apostle in the church.

== Early life ==
Rasband was born in Salt Lake City, Utah, to Rulon Hawkins Rasband and Verda Anderson. He graduated from Olympus High School and later served a mission for the LDS Church in the Eastern States Mission. The mission was headquartered in New York City and encompassed the whole New York Metro area, while also stretching into western New York and Pennsylvania. He spent much of his mission assigned to areas of the city mainly consisting of co-op apartments. Rasband studied at the University of Utah.

After Rasband returned from his mission, he married Melanie Twitchell in 1973 and they are the parents of five children.

== Business career ==
In 1976, Rasband joined the Huntsman Container Corporation as a sales representative based in Ohio. This company would later be sold to Keyes Fibre Company. As of 1982, Rasband was living in Ridgefield, Connecticut. He was recruited to join the new Huntsman Chemical Corporation by Jon Huntsman Sr. In 1987, Rasband was appointed president and chief operating officer of Huntsman Chemical. Rasband was later a member of the corporation's board of directors.

== LDS Church leadership ==
Rasband served as a member of the high council in the University of Utah 1st Stake from 1987 to 1989. He was bishop of the University of Utah 10th Ward from 1989 to 1993. From 1993 to 1997 he was a member of the church's Pioneer Sesquicentennial Committee. In 1996, Rasband was called to return to the area where he had been a missionary, to serve as president of New York New York North Mission. The mission's geographic area not only included Manhattan and the Bronx, but also stretched upriver to the area of West Point, as well as the far western portion of Connecticut. One of his initiatives was to have missionaries serve as volunteers at Ellis Island and the Statue of Liberty, in order to make the missionaries more visible.

=== General authority ===
Rasband was called as a general authority and member of the First Quorum of the Seventy in April 2000. As a general authority, Rasband has served in several area presidencies, including as a counselor in the presidency of the Europe Central Area. While serving in this position he dedicated the first chapel the church built in the Czech Republic. He was later president of the Utah Salt Lake City Area and executive director of the church's Temple Department.

In 2005, Rasband was called as a member of the Presidency of the Seventy, with responsibility for the church's North America Northwest and North America West areas. In August 2007, he was assigned to the Utah North, Utah South, and Utah Salt Lake City areas. In April 2009, Rasband became the senior and presiding member of the presidency when Neil L. Andersen was called to the Quorum of the Twelve. He served in this role until October 2015.

=== Quorum of the Twelve ===
In October 2015, Rasband was sustained as an apostle and member of the Quorum of the Twelve. As an apostle, he is accepted by the church as a prophet, seer and revelator. He was sustained to the Quorum of the Twelve along with Gary E. Stevenson and Dale G. Renlund, filling vacancies created by the 2015 deaths of L. Tom Perry, Boyd K. Packer and Richard G. Scott. This was the first time since 1906 that three new apostles were sustained at once. They are the 98th, 99th and 100th members of the Quorum of the Twelve Apostles in the church's history.

In August 2018, Rasband threw the ceremonial first pitch for the annual LDS Night of the Los Angeles Angels.

== Community service ==
Rasband has served as a member of the National Advisory Board for Brigham Young University's Marriott School of Management. He has also been a member of the Board of Citizens for Positive Community Values, a Salt Lake City-based organization, and of the University of Utah's International Advisory Board. On January 17, 2018, when Utah Governor Gary Herbert announced establishment of a task force to address teen suicide, Rasband participated in the announcement and will serve as a member of the task force.

The Church of Jesus Christ of Latter-day Saints titles
Preceded by Neil L. Andersen	Quorum of the Twelve Apostles; October 3, 2015 –	Succeeded by Gary E. Stevenson
