= Neil L. Andersen =

American Latter-day Saint leader (born 1951)

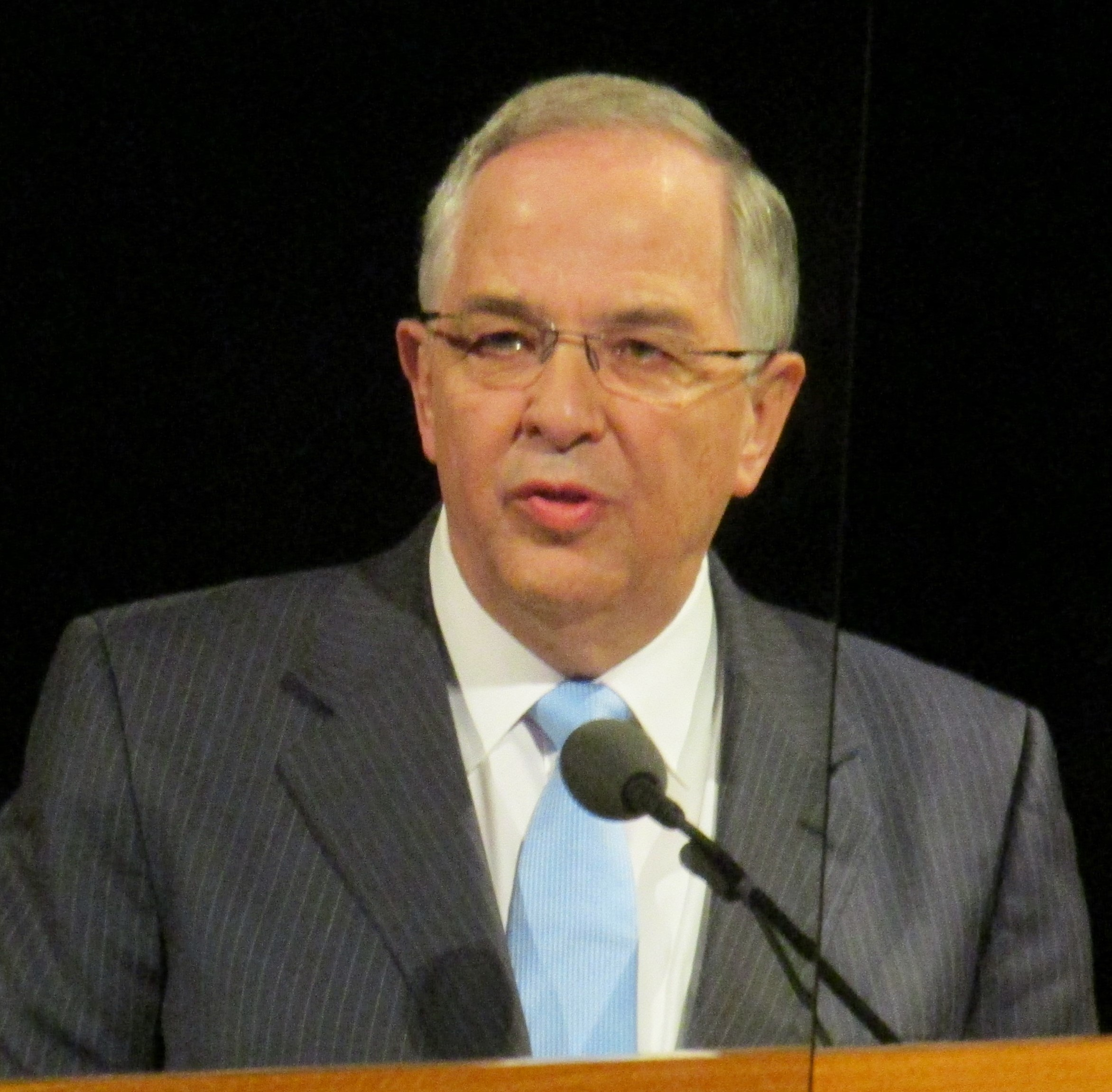

Quorum of the Twelve Apostles
- April 4, 2009 - Present

LDS Church Apostle
- April 9, 2009
- Reason: Death of Joseph B. Wirthlin

Presidency of the Seventy
- August 15, 2005 – April 4, 2009
- End reason: Called to the Quorum of the Twelve Apostles

First Quorum of the Seventy
- April 3, 1993 – April 4, 2009
- End reason: Called to the Quorum of the Twelve Apostles

Personal details
- Born: Neil Linden Andersen; August 9, 1951 (age 75); Logan, Utah, United States
- Education: Brigham Young University (BA); Harvard University (MBA)
- Spouse(s): Kathy Sue Williams (1975-present)
- Children: 4

Neil Linden Andersen (born August 9, 1951) is an American religious leader and former business executive who serves as a member of the Quorum of the Twelve Apostles of the Church of Jesus Christ of Latter-day Saints (LDS Church). He was sustained by church membership as an apostle on April 4, 2009, during the church's General Conference. At the time of his call to the Twelve, Andersen had been serving as an LDS general authority since 1993, including service in the Presidency of the Seventy from 2005 to 2009. Currently, he is the seventh most senior apostle in the church.

== Early life ==
Andersen was born in Logan, Utah and raised near Pocatello, Idaho. As a young man, he served in France as a missionary for the LDS Church. After his mission, he graduated from Brigham Young University (BYU) in 1975 with a bachelor's degree in economics and was elected student body vice president. He later earned an MBA from Harvard Business School in 1977. He later lived and worked in Tampa, Florida, where he was the vice president of the Morton Plant Health System. While in Tampa, Andersen served in the LDS Church as a stake president.

== LDS Church service ==
Andersen was president of the church's France Bordeaux Mission from 1989 to 1992. In 1993, he was called as a general authority and member of the First Quorum of the Seventy. As a general authority Seventy, he served as the assistant executive director of the Priesthood Department. He also served in the presidencies of the church's Utah North, Utah South, North America Southwest, North America Northeast, and Europe West areas, and as president of the Brazil South Area. In addition, he was the executive director of the Church Audiovisual Department; in that position, he managed the development of the film The Testaments: Of One Fold and One Shepherd and supervised the launch of the website Mormon.org. From 1997 to 2001, Andersen was a member of the general presidency of the church's Sunday School.

In 2005, Andersen became a member of the Presidency of the Seventy. In this capacity, he directed the affairs of the church in the Idaho Area and in 2006, he broke ground for the construction of the Twin Falls Idaho Temple. In 2007, Andersen was reassigned to preside over the North America Southwest Area. From August 2008 to April 2009, Andersen was the senior member of the seven-man presidency. On February 14, 2009, he broke ground for the construction of The Gila Valley Arizona Temple, located in Central, Arizona.

=== Quorum of the Twelve ===
In April 2009, Andersen was called by church president Thomas S. Monson to fill the vacancy created in the Quorum of the Twelve Apostles by the death of Joseph B. Wirthlin the previous year. In July 2013, Andersen attended the 2013 National Scout Jamboree and spoke to the 3,000 LDS Boy Scouts in attendance, one of the larger Sunday services he has attended. On July 1, 2016 Andersen threw out the ceremonial first pitch at a Los Angeles Dodgers baseball game as part of their long-running 'Mormon Night' tradition. Andersen reaffirmed the LDS Church's stance on marriage in the April 2019 general conference. Andersen remarked, "While many governments and well-meaning individuals have redefined marriage, the Lord has not." In the April 2025 general conference, Andersen reaffirmed the LDS Church's opposition to elective abortion, stating "protecting the unborn... is a moral law confirmed by the Lord through his prophets."

== Personal life ==
Andersen married Kathy Sue Williams in the Salt Lake Temple on March 20, 1975 while still students at BYU. They are the parents of four children.

The Church of Jesus Christ of Latter-day Saints titles
| Preceded by D. Todd Christofferson | Quorum of the Twelve Apostles; April 4, 2009 – | Succeeded by Ronald A. Rasband |
