= Urdaneta Philippines Temple =

Latter-day Saint temple in Pangasinan, Philippines

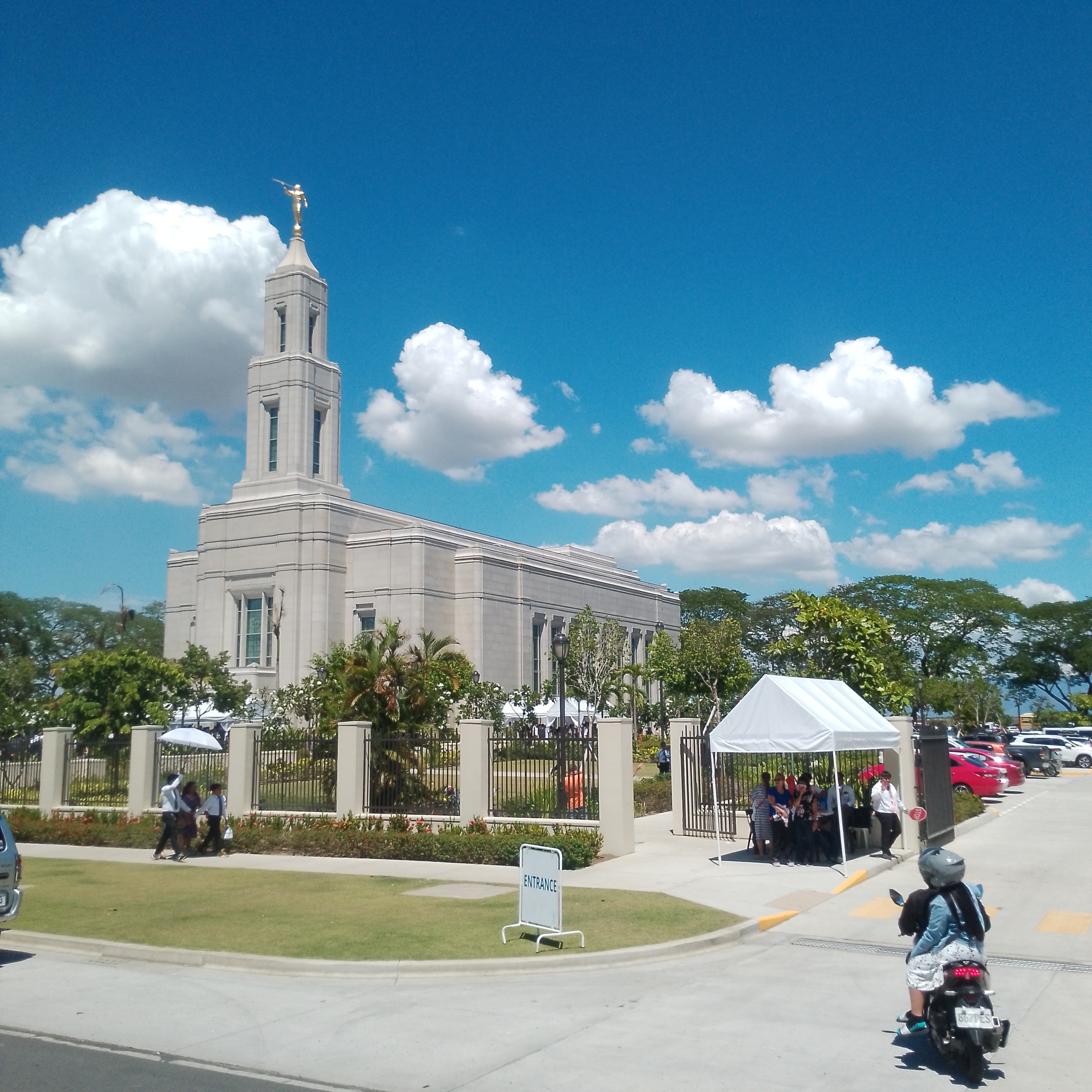
- Interactive map of Urdaneta Philippines Temple
- Number: 190
- Dedication: 28 April 2024, by Dallin H. Oaks
- Site: 15.34 acres (6.21 ha)
- Floor area: 32,604 ft^{2} (3,029.0 m^{2})
- Official website • News & images

Church chronology
| ← Red Cliffs Utah Temple | Urdaneta Philippines Temple | → Puebla Mexico Temple |

Additional information
- Announced: 2 October 2010, by Thomas S. Monson
- Groundbreaking: 16 January 2019, by Jeffrey R. Holland
- Open house: March 15 to 30, 2024
- Current president: Ofelia Garin Manarin Yu
- Location: Urdaneta, Philippines
- Coordinates: 15°56′19″N 120°34′55″E
- Baptistries: 1
- Ordinance rooms: 2
- Sealing rooms: 3

The Urdaneta Philippines Temple is the 190th temple of the Church of Jesus Christ of Latter-day Saints, located in Urdaneta City, Pangasinan, Philippines. The intent to build the temple was announced on October 2, 2010, by church president Thomas S. Monson, during general conference. The temple is the third in the Philippines, following those in Manila and Cebu City.

A groundbreaking ceremony, to signify beginning of construction, was held on January 16, 2019, with Jeffrey R. Holland presiding. The temple was dedicated by Dallin H. Oaks, of the church's First Presidency, on April 28, 2024. The first temple president is Roberto W. Yu, with Ofelia G. Manarin Yu serving as matron.

== History ==
On October 2, 2010, during the church's general conference, Monson announced the intent to construct a temple in Urdaneta City. The temple is located in the southern area of Urdaneta, approximately 100 miles north of Metro Manila on Luzon, the largest and most populated island in the Philippines. The temple serves church members in over 50 stakes and districts.

The groundbreaking ceremony, marking the commencement of construction, was held on January 16, 2019, with Jeffrey R. Holland presiding. The event was attended by local church members and community leaders, including the mayor of Urdaneta. The groundbreaking occurred 8 years after the announcement, with three more temples announced for the Philippines during that time. During construction various challenges were faced, including the temple site’s marshy land, which made it difficult to establish a strong foundation. Dallin H. Oaks, who dedicated the temple, previously served for two years as president of the church's Philippines Area while he was a member of the Quorum of Twelve Apostles. Oaks focused his efforts on increasing the number of temples in the country. At the time of his service in 2002, the church in the Philippines was experiencing rapid growth and had 600,000 members, but not enough members had a temple recommend for him to recommend building an additional temple. As of 2024, the Philippines has 13 temples either operating or in some form of construction or design. As of April 2024, the church reports having 867,271 members, 23 missions, and 128 stakes in the Philippines.

=== Temples in the Philippines ===
This is the church's third temple in the Philippines, following the Manila (1984) and Cebu City (2010) temples. More temples were announced in 2018 and 2019, with construction underway for the Alabang, Davao, and Bacolod temples. As of February 2024, others have been announced, with no dates set yet for the groundbreaking ceremonies, which will bring the total temples in the Philippines to 13. The church has experienced rapid growth in the country since missionaries first arrived in 1961. Since then, the church in the Philippines has gained more than 850,000 members, being the fourth most populous country of Latter-day Saints in the world.

== Design and architecture ==
The temple sits on a 32-acre (13 ha) site, and is constructed with concrete and golden sand granite from China. The site was chosen by church leadership due to being in a central location to 200,000 members. Oaks explained that church leaders build temples in the "center of the concentration" of their members, but that it all comes down to a spiritual choice, and the president of the church makes the selection. The overall size of the temple is 32,604 sq ft (3,029.0 m^{2}). The exterior features a rectangular base with rounded corners, long, vertical windows, and a spire with a statue of the angel Moroni. The temple has a single spire and a gold statue of the angel Moroni, and is 136 feet (41.6 m) to the top including the statue. The building has both Spanish and Asian influences.

Inside the temple, there are two instruction rooms used for the endowment, three sealing rooms, and a baptistry, each designed to perform specific ordinances sacred to church members. The temple site also features an ancillary building of 22,593 sq ft (2,099.0 m^{2}), and contains a visitors' center, patron housing, apartments for the temple presidency, and a distribution center.

The interior of the temple uses a variety of materials from outside the Philippines. The flooring is tile from Israel and Palestine, instruction room carpeting from the United States, with rugs from Thailand and New Zealand. Tiling in the baptistry is from Italy, and the oxen are made of painted fiberglass. Light fixtures were fabricated in Hong Kong, with furniture and seating from Vietnam. Millwork and doors of the temple are made from African mahogany.

The landscaping around the temple features six acacia trees, as well as a number of palm trees and shrubs. One of the motifs of the temple include the Sampaguita flower, which has symbolism to the Filipino people of humility, purity, strength and simplicity. Another motifs of the temple is the mango.

Art glass seen from the exterior of the temple features the sampaguita flower with three vertical bands. When viewed on the inside, the art glass gives the flowers purple and green highlights.

== Admittance and use ==
On December 11, 2023, the church announced the public open house which was held from March 15-30, 2024 (excluding Sundays). This allowed individuals of all faiths to experience the temple's architecture and learn about the ordinances to be performed inside. The temple was dedicated in two sessions by Dallin H. Oaks on April 28, 2024. Entry into the temple is available to church members holding a valid temple recommend.

== See also ==

Temples in the Philippines, Luzon Region
= Operating
= Under construction
= Announced
= Temporarily Closed

- The Church of Jesus Christ of Latter-day Saints in the Philippines
- Comparison of temples of The Church of Jesus Christ of Latter-day Saints
- List of temples of The Church of Jesus Christ of Latter-day Saints
- List of temples of The Church of Jesus Christ of Latter-day Saints by geographic region
- Religion in the Philippines
- Temple architecture (Latter-day Saints)
