= Urdaneta, Pangasinan =

Component city in Pangasinan, Philippines

Urdaneta
- Component city
- City of Urdaneta, Lungsod ng Urdaneta, Siyudad ti Urdaneta, Siyudad na Urdaneta
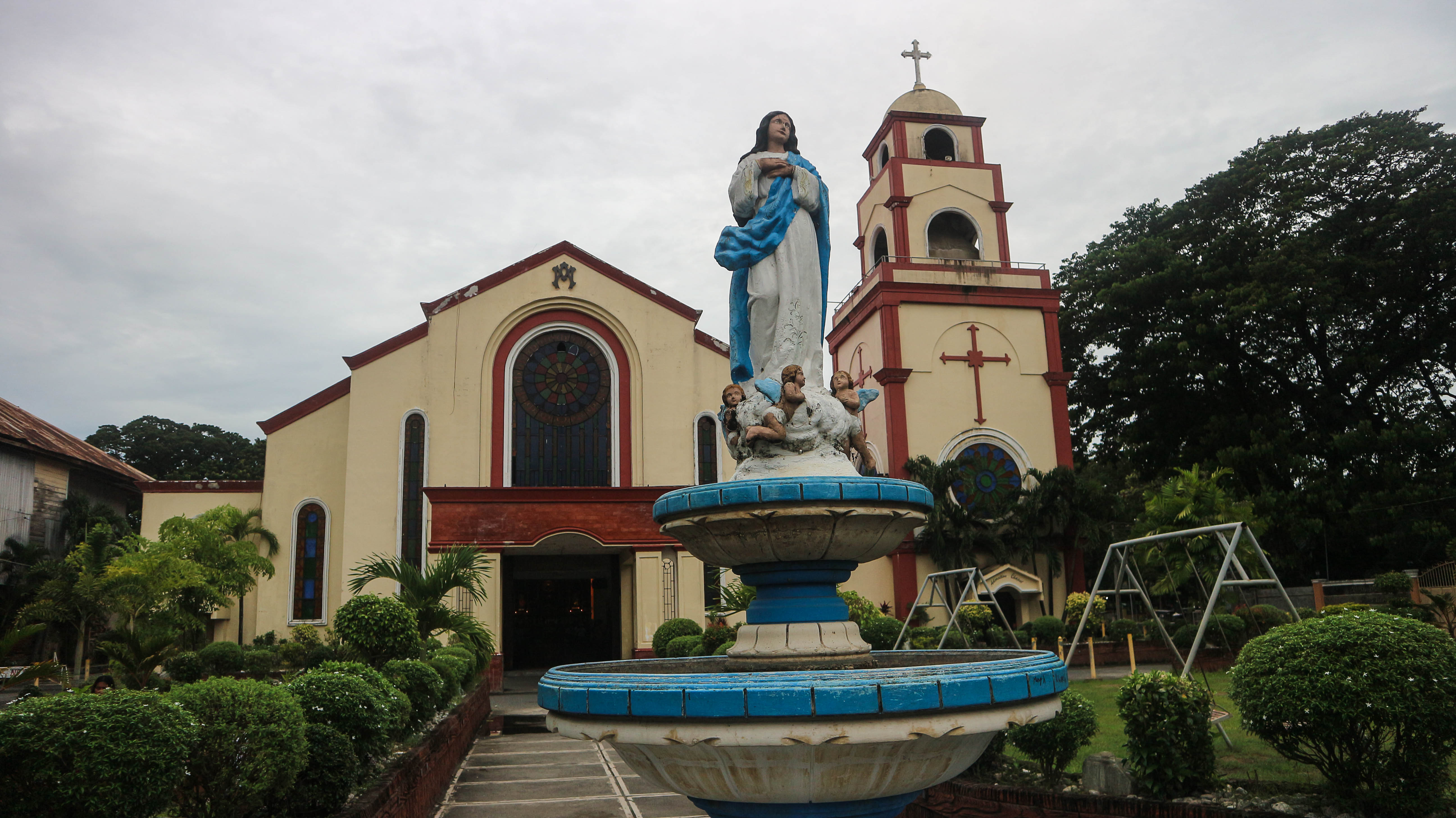
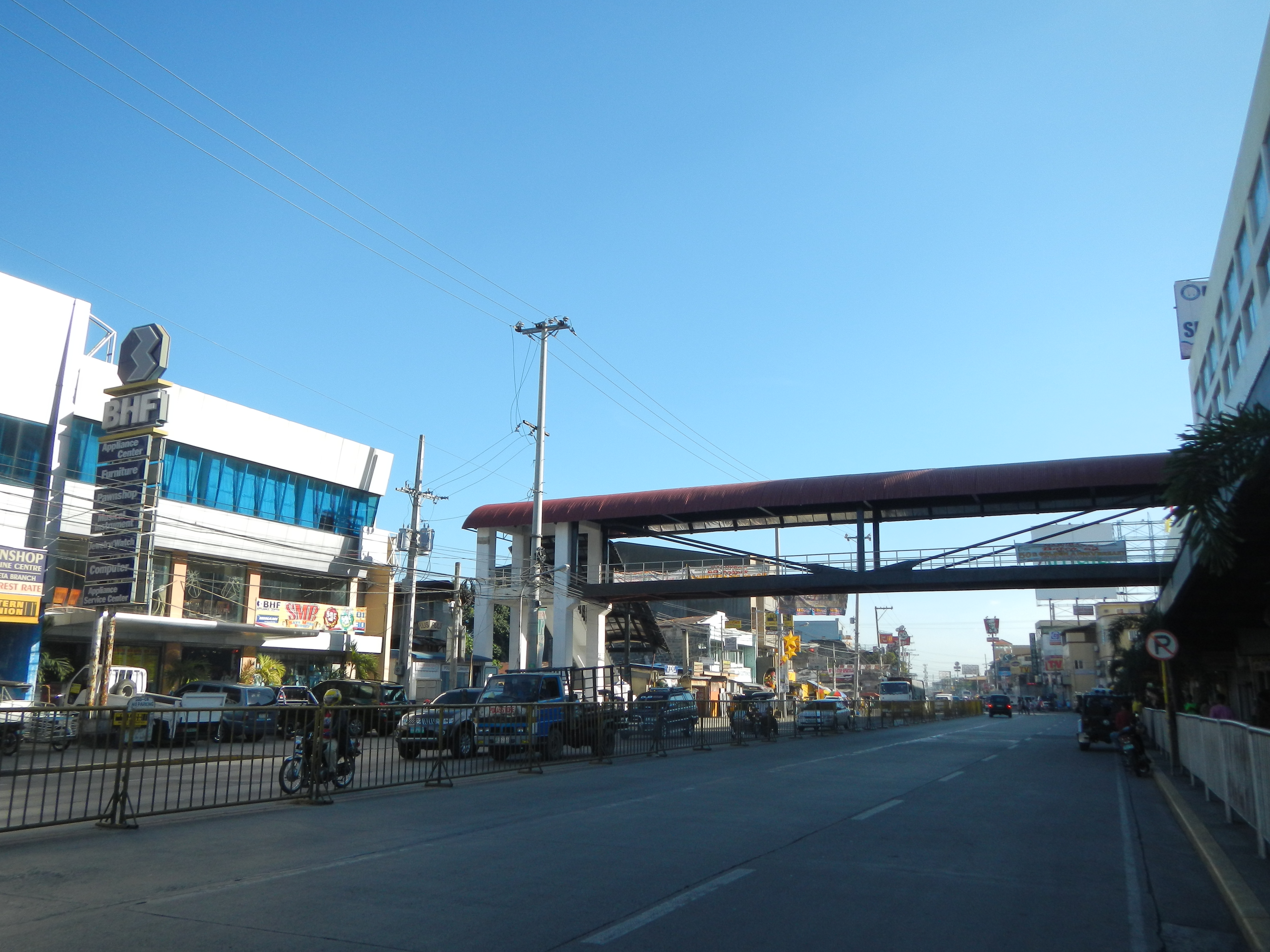
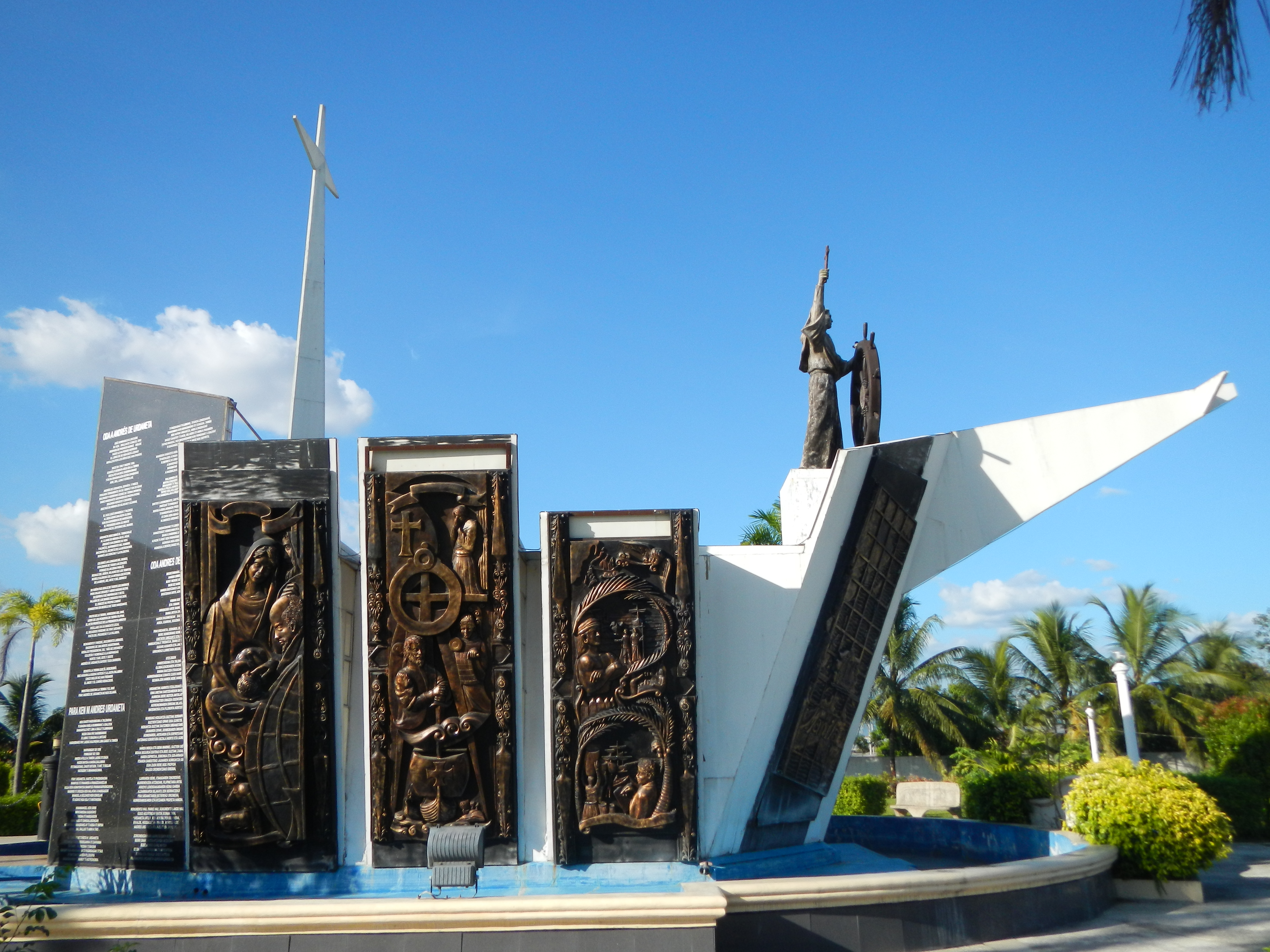
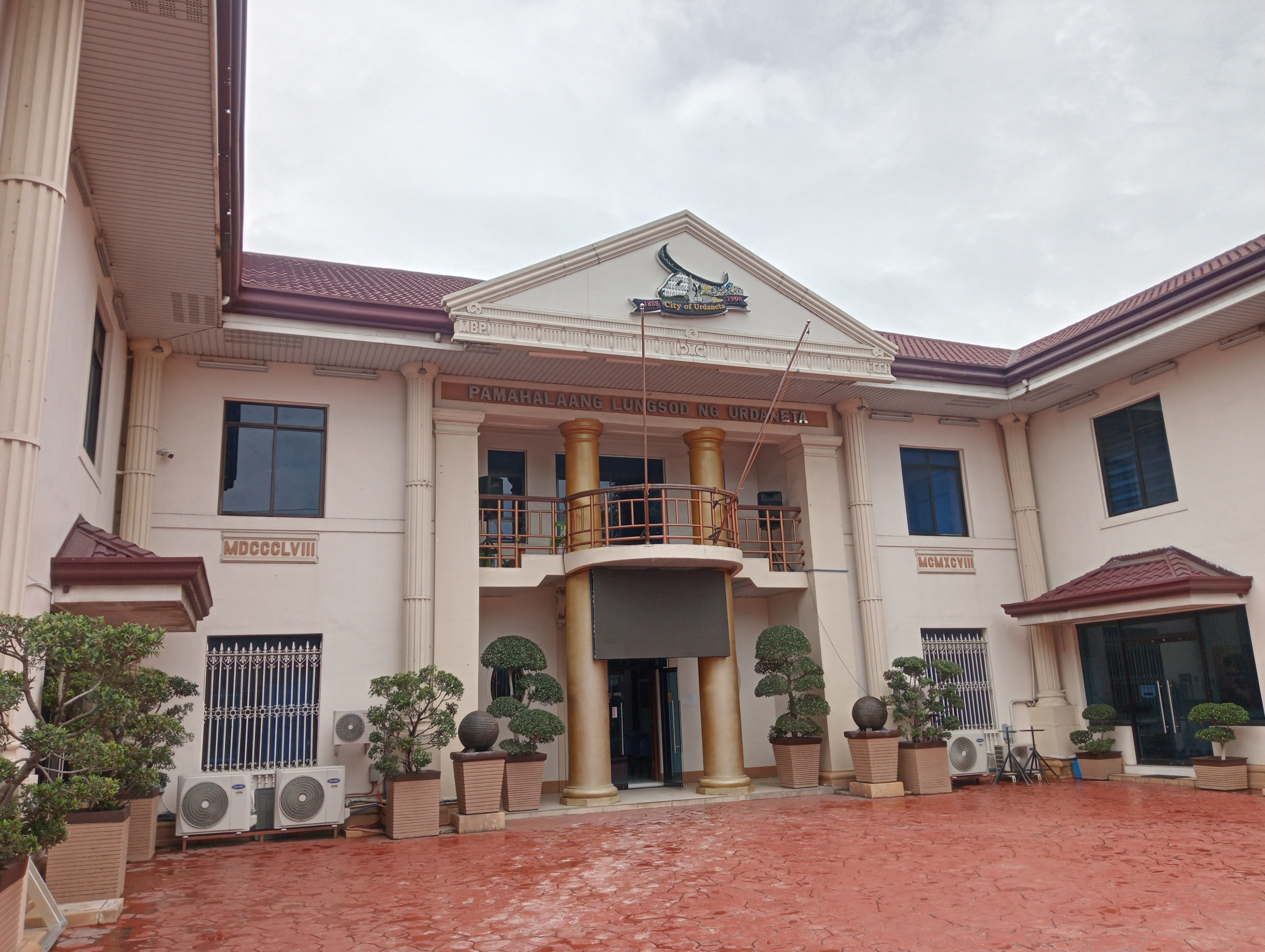
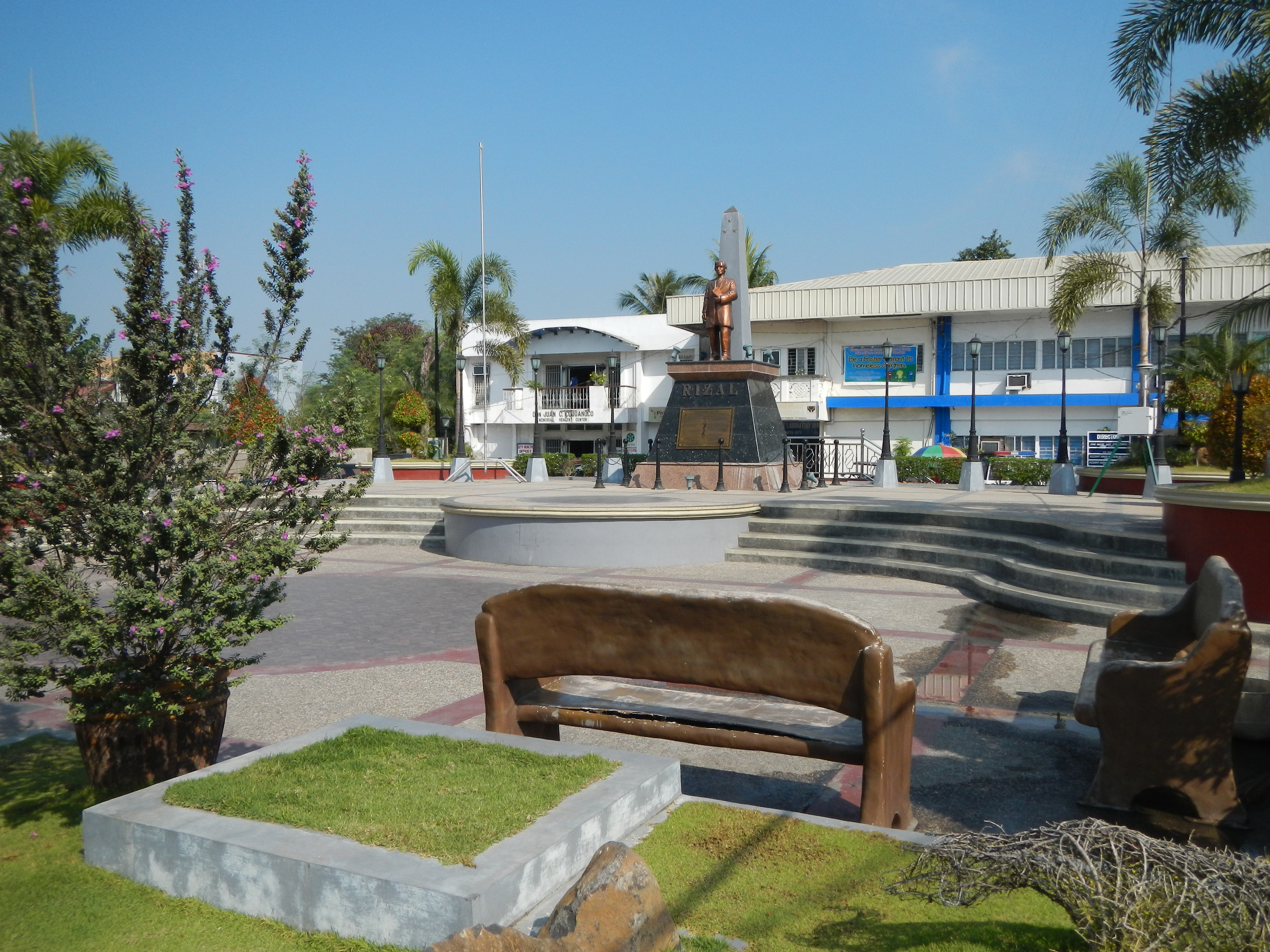
- Clockwise from top: Urdaneta Cathedral; Urdaneta Park Landmark Monument; Don Manuel N. Sison, Sr. Park; Old City Hall and Downtown Area

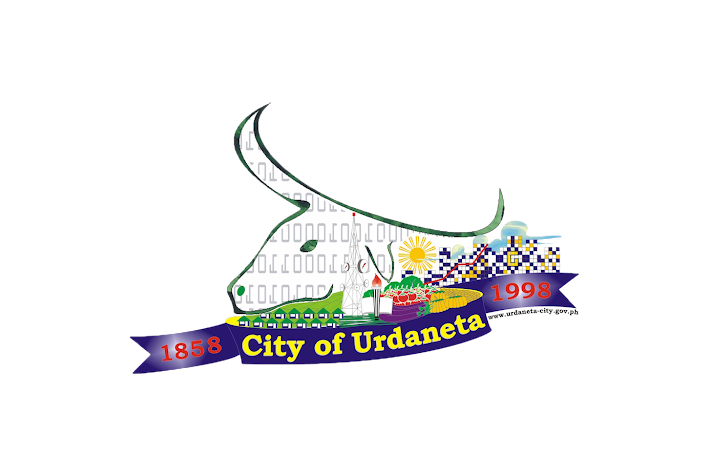
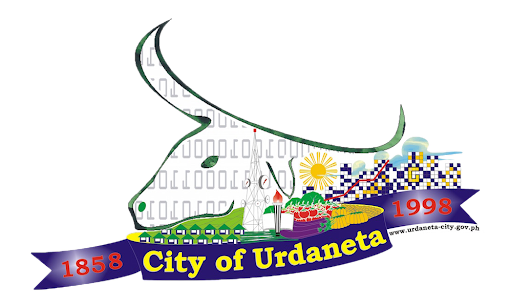
- Flag Wordmark
- Motto: Deo servire populo sufficere (It is enough for the people to serve God)
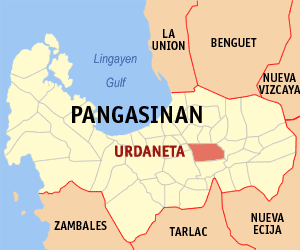
- Map of Pangasinan with Urdaneta highlighted
- Interactive map of Urdaneta
- Location within the Philippines
- Coordinates: 15°58′34″N 120°34′16″E
- Country: Philippines
- Region: Ilocos Region
- Province: Pangasinan
- District: 5th district
- Founded: January 8, 1858
- Cityhood: March 21, 1998
- Named for: Andrés de Urdaneta
- Barangays: 34 (see Barangays)

Government
  - Type: Sangguniang Panlungsod
  - Mayor: Blesildo F. Sumera (Independent)
  - Vice Mayor: Rio Virgilio R. Esteves (Independent)
  - Representative: Ramon Guico, Jr.
  - City Council: Members: Maria Teresa Socorro E. Perez - Naguiat; Onofre C. Gorospe; Maura Jennifer C. Gandia; Position vacant; Position vacant; Position vacant; Position vacant; Position vacant; Position vacant; Position vacant
  - Electorate: 102,425 voters (2025)

Area
  - Total: 100.26 km^{2} (38.71 sq mi)
- Elevation: 50 m (160 ft)
- Highest elevation: 899 m (2,949 ft)
- Lowest elevation: 0 m (0 ft)

Population (2024 census)
  - Total: 145,935
  - Density: 1,455.6/km^{2} (3,769.9/sq mi)
  - Households: 35,215
- Demonym: Urdanetanian

Economy
  - Income class: 1st city income class
  - Poverty incidence: 9.39% (2023)
  - Revenue: ₱ 1,483 million (2023), 1,573 million (2024)
  - Assets: ₱ 3,485 million (2023), 370.9 million (2024)
  - Expenditure: ₱ 1,349 million (2023), 1,475 million (2024)
  - Liabilities: ₱ 890 million (2023), 997.2 million (2024)

Service provider
  - Electricity: Pangasinan 3 Electric Cooperative (PANELCO 3)
  - Water: Urdaneta City Water District
- Time zone: UTC+8 (PST)
- ZIP code: 2428
- PSGC: 015546000
- IDD : area code: +63 (0)75
- Native languages: Pangasinan; Ilocano; Tagalog
- Website: urdaneta-city.gov.ph

Urdaneta, officially the City of Urdaneta (Pangasinan: Siyudad na Urdaneta; Ilocano: Siyudad ti Urdaneta; Filipino: Lungsod ng Urdaneta), is a component city in the province of Pangasinan, Philippines. According to the 2024 census, it has a population of 145,935 people. It is the third most populous local government unit (LGU) in Pangasinan and Ilocos Region. Urdaneta is currently the only city in Pangasinan classified as a first-class city based on its average annual regular income.

== History ==
Urdaneta was founded on January 8, 1858, by Pangasinenses and Ilocanos who sought greater ties and unity. The city was named after Father Andrés de Urdaneta, aide to Miguel Lopez De Legazpi, soldier, navigator, cosmographer, and evangelist. Father Urdaneta played a significant role in the colonization of the Philippines as he helped establish the first Spanish settlement on the island of Cebu in 1565. He also helped establish the first trade route between Mexico and the Philippines, which was used for over two centuries.

By naming the city after Father Urdaneta, the people of Urdaneta City pay tribute to his legacy and contributions to the country. His name has become synonymous with exploration, adventure, and faith - qualities that are celebrated in Urdaneta City. Today, the city continues to honor Father Urdaneta through various events, monuments, and institutions, which serve as reminders of his enduring legacy.

=== Cityhood ===
In 1998, the Philippine Congress passed Republic Act No. 8480, which converted the Municipality of Urdaneta into a component city of the Province of Pangasinan. The bill was sponsored by Rep. Amadeo R. Perez Jr., a congressman representing the 5th district of the province.

The passage of the bill was followed by a plebiscite, which was held on March 21, 1998. The people of Urdaneta overwhelmingly ratified the legislative act, with 26,222 in favor and only 142 against. As a result, Urdaneta was officially proclaimed as a city.

== Geography ==
Urdaneta has a land area of 12,100 hectares.

Urdaneta is situated 40.76 kilometres (25.33 mi) from the provincial capital Lingayen and 188.46 kilometres (117.10 mi) from the country's capital city of Manila.

=== Barangays ===
A map showcasing Urdaneta's 34 barangays

Urdaneta is politically subdivided into 34 barangays. Each barangay consists of puroks and some have sitios.

- Anonas
- Bactad East
- Bayaoas
- Bolaoen
- Cabaruan
- Cabuloan
- Camanang
- Camantiles
- Casantaan
- Catablan
- Cayambanan
- Consolacion
- Dilan Paurido
- Labit Proper
- Labit West
- Mabanogbog
- Macalong
- Nancalobasaan
- Nancamaliran East
- Nancamaliran West
- Nancayasan
- Oltama
- Palina East
- Palina West
- Pedro T. Orata (Bactad Proper)
- Pinmaludpod
- Poblacion
- San Jose
- San Vicente
- Santa Lucia
- Santo Domingo
- Sugcong
- Tipuso
- Tulong

=== Climate ===
Climate in Urdaneta is classified as tropical monsoon under the Köppen climate classification. The area experiences a distinct wet season from June to October, influenced primarily by the southwest monsoon, while the months from November to May are comparatively drier. Temperatures remain warm throughout the year, with average daily highs generally ranging from 30 to 34 °C and lows from 22 to 25 °C.

Rainfall is heaviest in August, which is typically the peak of the rainy season, and lightest in January during the dry period. Humidity remains high year-round due to the city’s low elevation and proximity to coastal air masses, contributing to consistently warm and humid conditions.

Climate data for Urdaneta
Month	Jan	Feb	Mar	Apr	May	Jun	Jul	Aug	Sep	Oct	Nov	Dec	Year
Mean daily maximum °C (°F)	29 (84)	29 (84)	30 (86)	32 (90)	33 (91)	33 (91)	33 (91)	33 (91)	33 (91)	32 (90)	31 (88)	29 (84)	31 (88)
Mean daily minimum °C (°F)	21 (70)	21 (70)	22 (72)	23 (73)	24 (75)	24 (75)	24 (75)	24 (75)	23 (73)	23 (73)	22 (72)	21 (70)	23 (73)
Average precipitation mm (inches)	127.5 (5.02)	115.8 (4.56)	129.7 (5.11)	141.1 (5.56)	248.2 (9.77)	165 (6.5)	185.3 (7.30)	161.9 (6.37)	221.4 (8.72)	299.5 (11.79)	199 (7.8)	188.7 (7.43)	2,183.1 (85.93)
Average rainy days	17	17	17	15	20	19	19	20	21	20	17	19	221
Source: World Weather Online

== Demographics ==
=== Population ===
Urdaneta City is the third most populous city in Ilocos Region, with 145,935 residents, following San Carlos City in Pangasinan, which has 208,330 people, and Dagupan City, with 174,777 residents.

Population census of Urdaneta
Year	Pop.	±% p.a.
1903	20,544	—
1918	24,536	+1.19%
1939	29,120	+0.82%
1948	35,811	+2.32%
1960	44,744	+1.87%
1970	58,690	+2.75%
1975	65,392	+2.19%
1980	71,796	+1.89%
1990	90,694	+2.36%
1995	100,263	+1.90%
2000	111,582	+2.32%
2007	120,785	+1.10%
2010	125,451	+1.39%
2015	132,940	+1.11%
2020	144,577	+1.78%
2024	145,935	+0.22%
Source: Philippine Statistics Authority

Population per barangay (2024)
Rank	Barangay	Population
1	San Vicente	9,532
2	Pinmaludpod	8,324
3	Nancayasan	8,175
4	Poblacion	7,301
5	Dilan Paurido	7,186
6	Camantiles	6,564
7	Anonas	6,285
8	Catablan	6,107
9	Nancamaliran West	5,981
10	Bayaoas	5,864
11	San Jose	5,730
12	Camanang	5,397
13	Nancamaliran East	5,284
14	Palina East	5,190
15	Cayambanan	4,408
16	Labit Proper	3,939
17	Cabuloan	3,564
17	Mabanogbog	3,564
19	Pedro T. Orata	3,458
20	Palina West	3,443
21	Santo Domingo	3,423
22	Santa Lucia	3,401
23	Nancalobasaan	3,364
24	Labit West	2,751
25	Cabaruan	2,389
26	Tipuso	2,262
27	Bactad East	2,231
28	Consolacion	1,830
29	Macalong	1,756
30	Bolaoen	1,604
31	Tulong	1,567
32	Casantaan	1,479
33	Oltama	1,422
34	Sugcong	1,160
Total		145,935

=== Languages ===
Pangasinan and Ilocano are the main languages of Urdaneta.

=== Religion ===
==== Roman Catholicism ====
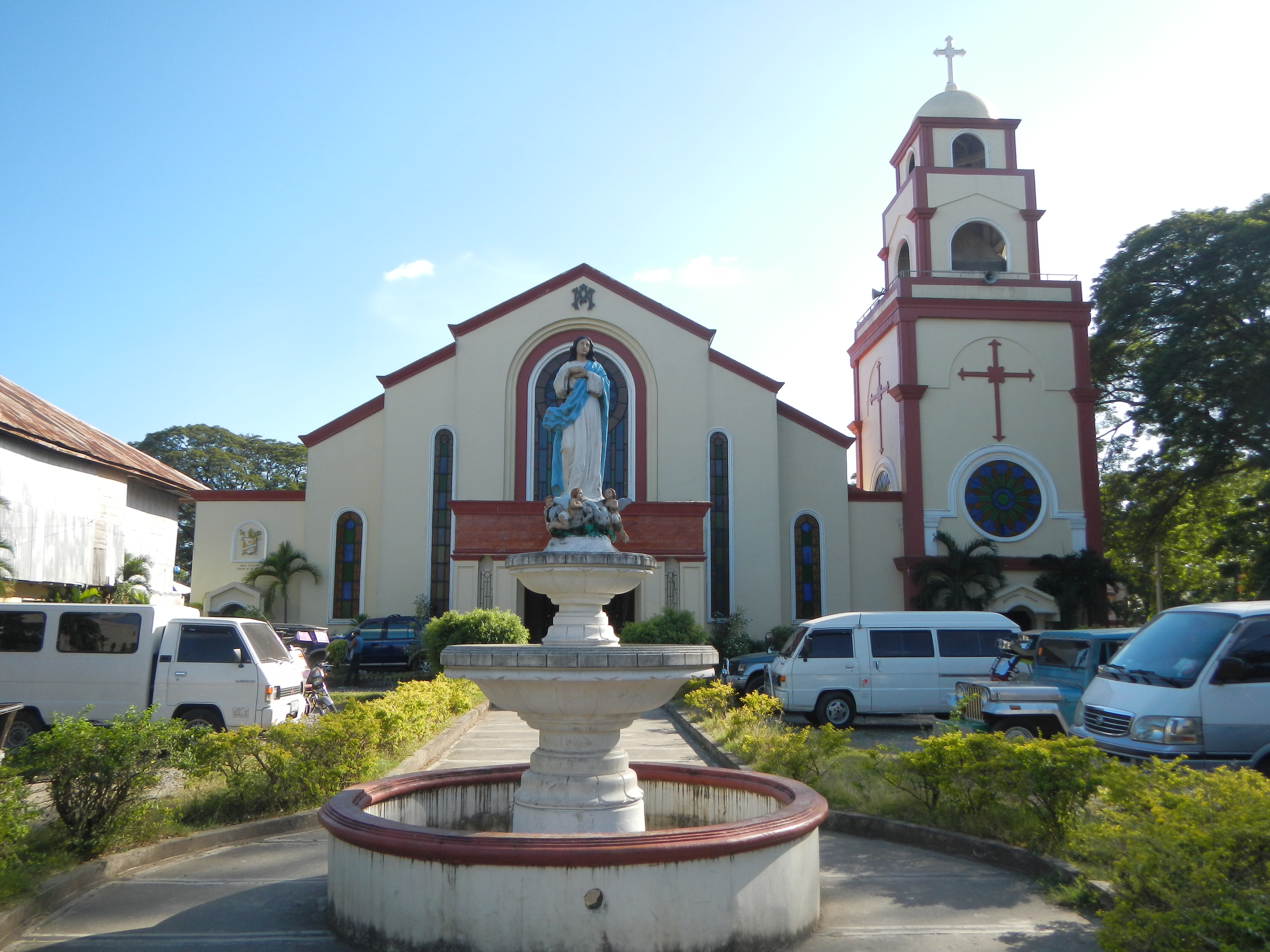
Our Lady of the Immaculate Conception Cathedral

The Urdaneta Cathedral or the Immaculate Conception Cathedral in Urdaneta is part of the Vicariate of Our Lady. Its vicar foranes are Rev. Fr. Alberto T. Arenos and Father Elpidio F. Silva Jr. Its feast day is December 8. Local Ordinary is Bishop Jacinto Agcaoili Jose, JCL, DD. Founded on January 8, 1858, it is a suffragan diocese of the Roman Catholic Archdiocese of Lingayen-Dagupan.

The diocese is led by Bishop Jacinto Jose, who also serves as vice chairman of the Catholic Bishops' Conference of the Philippines (CBCP) Episcopal Commission of Social Communications and Mass Media and member of the Episcopal Commission on Youth.

Previous ordinaries were Bishop Jesus Castro Galang (December 7, 1991 – September 16, 2004) and Bishop Pedro G. Magugat, M.S.C. (April 22, 1985 – May 5, 1990). Other diocesan officials hold office at the Bishop's Residence and Chancery of Obispado de Urdaneta Building, Dr. Jose Aruego Street, Urdaneta, Pangasinan. The Vicar General is Msgr. Numeriano A. Gabot Jr. and Chancellor, Father Angelo B. Lopez.

==== Philippine Independent Church or Aglipayan Church ====
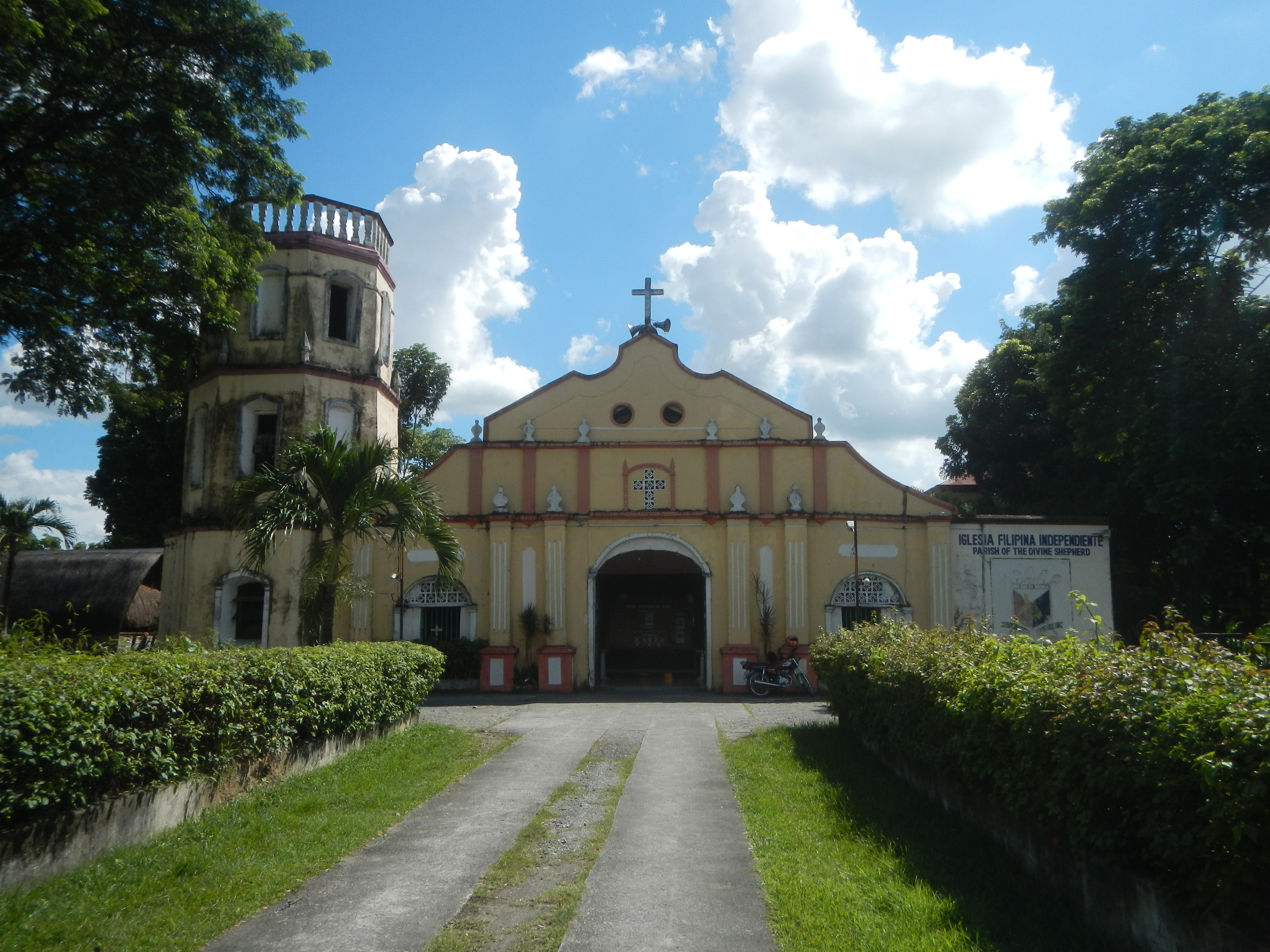
The Parish of the Divine Shepherd at the Aglipay Central Theological Seminary of the Philippine Independent Church

The Aglipay Central Theological Seminary (ACTS) in Urdaneta City, Pangasinan is the regional seminary of the Philippine Independent Church dedicated to serve the North-Central and South-Central Luzon Dioceses. ACTS offers a Bachelor of Theology and Divinity Programs for those who aspire to enter the ordained ministry in the Church. It is a four-year study program with a curriculum focused on biblical, theological, historical and pastoral studies with reference to parish management and development and wider cultural and social context. Members of the Philippine Independent Church or Aglipayans have the second most members in the city.

==== The Church of Jesus Christ of Latter-Day Saints ====
Urdaneta was selected as the site of the Urdaneta Philippines Temple, which was dedicated on April 28, 2024. The third temple of the Church of Jesus Christ of Latter-day Saints built in the Philippines (the other two being in Manila and Cebu City) Additionally, there are multiple temples under construction or in the planning process in Alabang, Davao, Bacolod, Cagayan de Oro, Tacloban, Naga, Santiago, Tuguegarao City, Iloilo, and Laoag.

=== Iglesia ni Cristo (Church of Christ) ===
Urdaneta is one of the Major Ecclesiastical Districts of the Church, comprising 12 local chapels serves as barangay chapel, the biggest one is situated at Sison St., Poblacion Proper and the district office is located, and one Group Worship Service Chapel. INC Considered minority increasing members throughout the city. The percentage comprises 5-9% of the Urdanetanians.

== Economy ==
Poverty incidence of Urdaneta (%)

Source: Philippine Statistics Authority

As gateway to northern Philippines, the city's strategic location is on the central part of eastern Pangasinan. Urdaneta is among the most progressive cities in northern Luzon in annual regular income beating all cities in Region 1. It is among the region's cleanest, greenest and most livable cities.

Urdaneta produces rice, vegetables and noodles. As a trading hub of Pangasinan, it has a “Bagsakan” (trading post), a drop-off point for fruits and vegetables.

The largest cattle market in northern Luzon is Urdaneta's Livestock Market. The city has numerous financial and banking institutions which make it among the most vibrant economies in Pangasinan and the whole Ilocos Region.

=== Tourism ===
Attractions include Museo de Urdaneta, Cabaruan, Sugcong and Oltama Rolling Hills, inter alia. The Sanctuary I.T. Building (Barangay Nancaysan, MacArthur Highway, the only Philippine Economic Zone Authority (PEZA) proclaimed I.T. Building in Pangasinan) houses the first two call centers: FFG Telemarketing (a Filipino-Canadian outbound call center) and EIE Inc. (Filipino-owned website services marketing firm).

== Government ==
=== Local government ===
Urdaneta, belonging to the fifth congressional district of the province of Pangasinan, is governed by a mayor designated as its local chief executive and by a city council as its legislative body in accordance with the Local Government Code. The mayor, vice mayor, and the councilors are elected directly by the people through an election which is being held every three years.

=== Current officials ===
Members of the Urdaneta City Council (October 16, 2026–Present)
Position	Name
Chief Executive of the City of Urdaneta	Mayor Blesildo F. Sumera
Presiding Officer of the City Council of Urdaneta	Vice-Mayor Rio Virgilio R. Esteves
Councilors of the City of Urdaneta	Maria Teresa Soccoro E. Perez - Naguiat
Councilors of the City of Urdaneta	Onofre C. Gorospe
Councilors of the City of Urdaneta	Maura Jennifer C. Gandia
Councilors of the City of Urdaneta	Position vacant
Councilors of the City of Urdaneta	Position vacant
Councilors of the City of Urdaneta	Position vacant
Councilors of the City of Urdaneta	Position vacant
Councilors of the City of Urdaneta	Position vacant
Councilors of the City of Urdaneta	Position vacant
Councilors of the City of Urdaneta	Position vacant
Ex officio members
Liga ng mga Barangay President	Jose Roy A. Parayno
SK Feredation President	Renzee Carl C. Parayno

=== List of mayors ===
No.	Portrait	Name	Term start	Term end
1	No available picture	Patricio Abenojar	1937	1941
2	No available picture	Hermogenes Israel	1942	1944
3		Mariano S. Moreno	1944	1945
4	No available picture	Manuel Del Prado	1945	1945
5	No available picture	Andres F. Adia	1946	1946
6	No available picture	Patricio Abenojar	1946	1947
7	No available picture	Manuel S. Sison	1948	1959
8	No available picture	Leon S. Zabala	1959	1963
9		Fernando C. Manangan, Sr.	1963	1966
10		Amadeo R. Perez, Jr.	1966	1968
11		Amando M. Fontanilla	1969	1971
12	No available picture	Manuel N. Sison	1972	1980
13		Amadeo R. Perez, Jr.	1980	1986
14	No available picture	Norberto Del Prado (Officer in Charge)	1986	1987
15		Amadeo R. Perez, Jr.	1988	1992
16		Rodolfo E. Parayno	June 30, 1992	June 30, 2001
17		Amadeo R. Perez, Jr.	June 30, 2001	June 30, 2010
18		Amadeo Gregorio E. Perez IV	June 30, 2010	June 30, 2019
19		Julio F. Parayno III	June 30, 2019	October 16, 2026 (Note: Dismissed by Ombudsman)
20		Blesildo F. Sumera	October 16, 2026	Incumbent

== Culture ==
=== Festivals ===
Urdaneta City celebrates Dumayo Festival annually March 18 – 31: Basbas ng Pag-iisang Dibdib (free mass wedding), bloodletting activity, tree planting for environment preservation, jobs fair and fun run for a cause.

The city celebrates fiesta every month of December. This is in remembrance of the city patron, Our Lady of the Immaculate Conception. Festivities are held December 1–8. Activities include a parade, drum and lyre competition, teachers' night, balikbayan night, ABC-SK night, ballroom, Miss Urdaneta City coronation night and many more events. A carnival is put up every December as a part of the event.

In the 2012 yearly City Fiesta celebration (December 1–15), Fifth District Representative Kimi S. Cojuangco formally (December 1) opened the agro-industrial fair where “bahay kubo” booths of the city's barangays showcased their products at the Urdaneta City Cultural and Sports Complex. Cojuangco was assisted by Manila Economic and Cultural Office Chair Amadeo R. Perez Jr., Mayor Amadeo Gregorio “Bobom” Perez IV and members of the Sangguniang Bayan led by Vice Mayor Onofre C. Gorospe.

== Education ==
The Urdaneta City Schools District Office governs all educational institutions within the city. It oversees the management and operations of all private and public, from primary to secondary schools.

=== Primary and elementary schools ===
- Anonas East Elementary School
- Anonas Elementary School
- Bactad Community School
- Bactad East Elementary School
- Badipa Elementary School
- Berean Academy of Urdaneta City, Inc.
- Bolaoen Elementary School
- Bright International Special School of Urdaneta, Inc.
- Cabaruan Elementary School
- Cabuloan Elementary School
- Calegu Elementary School
- Camanang Elementary School
- Camantiles Elementary School
- Casabula Elementary School
- Cayambanan Elementary School
- Consolacion Elementary School
- Don Amadeo Perez Sr. Memorial Elementary Central School - Main
- Don Amadeo Perez, Sr. Memorial Elementary Central School - East
- Don Amadeo Perez, Sr. Memorial Elementary Central School - West
- Don Andres G. Maiquez Memorial School
- Don Clemente Blanco Memorial Elementary School
- Don Felipe Maramba Elementary School
- Don Valentin M. Ordonez Memorial School
- Florentino B. Goce Community School
- Froebel Academy of Pangasinan, Inc.
- Holy Gem & Scepter Academy
- Labit East Elementary School
- Labit West Elementary School
- Lananpin Elementary School
- Lazaga Elementary School
- Manan Elementary School
- Michelli Marie's Special School
- Nanbacuran Elementary School
- Nancalobasaan Elementary School
- Nancalobasaan Riverside Elementary School
- Nancayasan Elementary School
- Oltama Elementary School
- Palina East Elementary School
- Pinmaludpod Elementary School
- San Jose Elementary School
- Sta. Lucia Elementary School
- Tabuyoc Elementary School
- The North Woods Academy of Urdaneta Inc.
- Tiposu Elementary School
- Trinidad S. Perez Elementary School
- Tulong Elementary School
- Urdaneta City Academic Pathways, Inc.
- Urdaneta City SPED Center
- Urdaneta I Central School
- Vicente Taaca Memorial School

=== Secondary schools ===
- Anonas National High School
- Bactad East National High School
- Badipa National High School
- Berean Academy of Urdaneta City, Inc.
- Cabaruan National High School
- Cabuloan National High School
- Calegu Integrated School
- Camabu National High School
- Camantiles National High School
- Casabula National High School
- Catablan Integrated School
- Cayambanan National High School
- Divine Grace Montessori and High School of Urdaneta, Inc
- Don Alipio Fernandez, Sr. Integrated School
- Don Antonio Bongolan Memorial High School
- Immaculate Heart Learning Center
- Labit National High School
- Lananpin National High School
- Lyceum Northern Luzon High School
- Maranatha Christian Academy of Urdaneta, Inc.
- Mariano Q. Umipig National High School
- MAV School of Multiple Intelligence, Inc.
- Merryland Montessori and High School, Inc.
- Messiah Christian Academy Inc.
- Mother Goose Special School System, Inc.
- Nancalobasaan National High School
- Our Lady of the Lilies Academy
- Palina East National High School
- Palina West National High School
- Pedro T. Orata National High School
- San Jose Leet Integrated School
- St. Andrew Montessori and High School, Inc.
- St. Francis Urdaneta, Inc.
- Urdaneta City National High School

=== Colleges and universities ===
- ABE International College of Business and Accountancy-Urdaneta
- AIE College - Urdaneta, Inc.
- Divine Word College of Urdaneta
- International Colleges for Excellence Inc.
- Luzon College of Science and Technology
- Lyceum - Northwestern University
- Pangasinan State University-Urdaneta
- PHINMA-UPang College Urdaneta, Inc.
- Panpacific University
- Urdaneta City University
- Wellcare Institute of Science and Technology

== Transportation ==
The city has many highways, such as the Tarlac–Pangasinan–La Union Expressway (TPLEX) and MacArthur Highway.

== Notable personalities ==
- Danny Ildefonso, two-time PBA Season MVP, five-time Best Player of the Conference, three-time Finals MVP, All-Star Game MVP, Rookie of the Year, Comeback Player of the Year, eight-time PBA Champion and one of the 40 Greatest Players in PBA History.
- Barbara Perez, award-winning actress known as the Audrey Hepburn of the Philippines.
- Lolita Rodriguez, award-winning actress.
- Romeo de la Cruz, former Solicitor General of the Philippines.
- Rose Martinez, Hawaiian politician.
- Pedro María Sison, Filipino senator from 1916 to 1922
- Jonel Nuezca, perpetrator of the 2020 Tarlac shooting (currently buried in the Urdaneta City Memorial Park)
