= Bacolod Philippines Temple =

Temple of The Church of Jesus Christ of Latter-day Saints in Bacolod City, Philippines

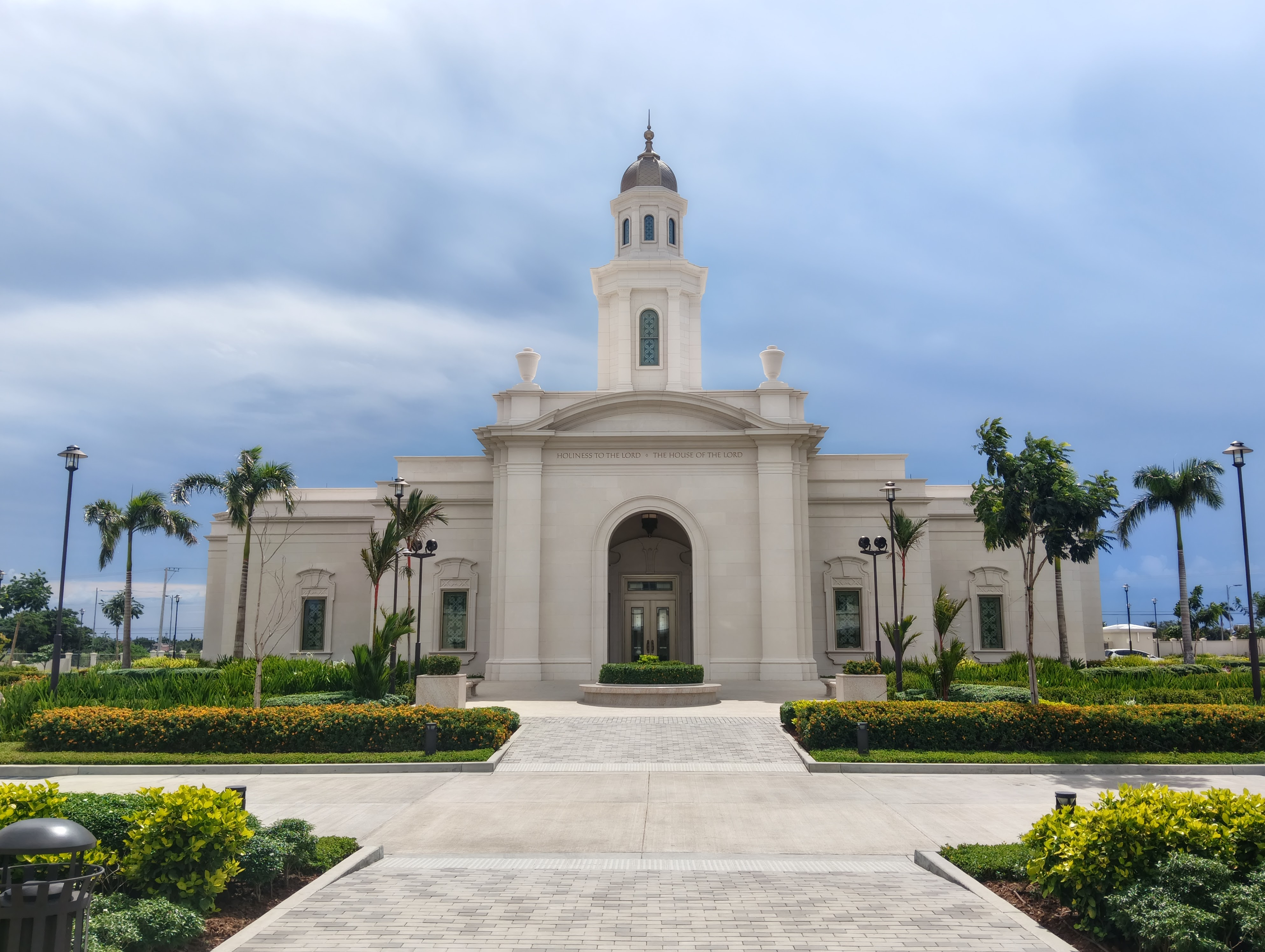
- The exterior of the Bacolod Philippines Temple.
- Interactive map of Bacolod Philippines Temple
- Number: 217
- Dedication: 31 May 2026, by Neil L. Andersen
- Site: 12.3 acres (5.0 ha)
- Floor area: 27,895 ft^{2} (2,591.5 m^{2})
- Official website • News & images

Church chronology
← Lindon Utah Temple	Bacolod Philippines Temple	→ Willamette Valley Oregon Temple

Additional information
- Announced: 5 October 2019, by Russell M. Nelson
- Groundbreaking: 11 December 2021, by Taniela B. Wakolo
- Open house: 16 April–2 May 2026
- Current president: Gregorio Horlador Lagaña
- Location: Bacolod, Philippines
- Coordinates: 10°41′48″N 122°59′21″E
- Baptistries: 1
- Ordinance rooms: 2
- Sealing rooms: 2

The Bacolod Philippines Temple is a temple of the Church of Jesus Christ of Latter-day Saints in Bacolod City, Philippines. It was announced on October 5, 2019, by church president Russell M. Nelson and was dedicated on May 31, 2026. It is the sixth operating temple in the Philippines and the second in the Visayas region.

Bacolod is the capital of Negros Occidental and serves as a regional center for the island of Negros in the central Visayas. The temple district serves church members throughout Negros Island and the surrounding areas.

== History ==
The intention to construct the Bacolod Philippines Temple was announced on October 5, 2019, by church president Russell M. Nelson during the October 2019 general conference. The announcement reflects continued church growth in the central Visayas. Before the temple's dedication, members in Negros travel to attend the Cebu City Philippines Temple.

A groundbreaking ceremony was held on December 11, 2021. The event was presided over by Taniela B. Wakolo, a general authority and president of the Philippines Area. with local church leaders and members in attendance.

In December 2025, the church announced dates for the public open house and dedication of the temple. A media day was held on April 13, 2026, followed by guest tours on April 14–15. The public open house was held from April 16 through May 2, 2026, excluding Sundays. The temple was dedicated on May 31, 2026, by Neil L. Andersen of the Quorum of the Twelve Apostles.

== Design and architecture ==
The temple is a single-story structure of approximately 26,700 square feet (2,481 m²). The design includes a single attached central tower with a domed cupola and metallic diamond shingles, backlit art glass, decorative urns, and ornate window casings. It follows architectural patterns consistent with recently constructed temples in the Philippines. The temple includes a baptistry, instruction rooms, and sealing rooms.

The temple is on a 12.3-acre site along Bacolod Airport Access Road, north of Buri Road, in Bacolod City. In addition to the main temple structure, the site includes an ancillary building of approximately 1,672 m^{2} (18,000 sq ft) and houses patron housing, an arrival center, and a distribution center.

== Temple leadership ==
The church's temples are directed by a temple president and matron, each typically serving for a term of three years. The president and matron oversee the administration of temple operations and provide guidance and training for both temple patrons and staff. Gregorio Horlador Lagaña and Maria Luisa Arnaiz Nain Lagaña are the first president and matron.

== Open house and admittance ==
Before its dedication, a public open house was held from April 16 to May 2, 2026.

Like all the church's temples, it is not used for Sunday worship services. To members of the church, temples are regarded as sacred houses of the Lord. Once dedicated, only church members with a current temple recommend can enter for worship.

== See also ==

Temples in the Philippines

= Operating

= Under construction

= Announced

= Temporarily Closed

- The Church of Jesus Christ of Latter-day Saints in the Philippines
- Comparison of temples (LDS Church)
- List of temples (LDS Church)
- List of temples by geographic region (LDS Church)
- Religion in the Philippines
- Temple architecture (LDS Church)
