= DZAI =

OK FM
Urdaneta, Pangasinan; Philippines
- Broadcast area: Eastern Pangasinan
- Frequency: 92.1 MHz
- Branding: 92.1 OK FM

Programming
- Languages: Pangasinense, Filipino
- Format: Contemporary MOR, OPM

Ownership
- Owner: Satellite Broadcasting Inc.

History
- First air date: 1990s

Technical information
- Licensing authority: NTC
- Power: 1 Kw

92.1 OK FM (DZAI 92.1 MHz) is an FM station owned and operated by Satellite Broadcasting Inc.. Its studios and transmitter are located at Mcarthur Highway, Brgy. San Vicente, Urdaneta, Pangasinan.
