= Davao Philippines Temple =

Temple in Davao City, Philippines

- Interactive map of Davao Philippines Temple
- Number: 215
- Dedication: 3 May 2026, by Dale G. Renlund
- Site: 2.7 acres (1.1 ha)
- Floor area: 18,450 ft^{2} (1,714 m^{2})
- Official website • News & images

Church chronology
← Harare Zimbabwe Temple	Davao Philippines Temple	→ Lindon Utah Temple

Additional information
- Announced: 7 October 2018, by Russell M. Nelson
- Groundbreaking: 14 November 2020, by Taniela B. Wakolo
- Open house: 26 March–10 April 2026
- Current president: Edgar Cabrera
- Location: Davao, Philippines
- Coordinates: 7°05′18″N 125°34′44″E

The Davao Philippines Temple is a temple of the Church of Jesus Christ of Latter-day Saints in Davao City, Philippines. Church president Russell M. Nelson announced plans to construct the temple on October 7, 2018, during general conference. It is the first temple built on the island of Mindanao and the fifth in the Philippines. Ground was broken for the temple on November 14, 2020, with Taniela B. Wakolo, president of the church's Philippines Area, presiding. The temple features a two-level steeple, with each side and level featuring eight windows arranged in arched patterns. It was built on 2.7 acres in Davao City. A public open house was held from March 26 through April 10, 2026. The temple was dedicated by Dale G. Renlund, of the Quorum of the Twelve Apostles, on May 3, 2026.

== History ==
=== Early church history in Davao and the Philippines ===
A few Filipinos joined the church in the 1940s and 1950s, but missionary work did not begin in earnest in the Philippines until 1961.

Cipriano Mumar, a minister in Davao City who served as an evangelical minister, obtained a Book of Mormon from an acquaintance between 1961 and 1962. His comparative study of the Bible and Book of Mormon led him to believe the latter represented the Stick of Ephraim mentioned in Ezekiel 37:15-19. Mumar wrote to church headquarters in Salt Lake City seeking the nearest meetinghouse location, learning the closest facility was in Japan. The church officially opened Davao City for missionary work on May 20, 1968. Missionaries Lorenzo Bott and Bruce Stone taught the Mumar family for five weeks before baptizing Cipriano, his wife, and eldest son on June 29, 1968, making them Davao City's first church members. By the end of the 1960s, the church had a presence on eight major islands, and organized the first stake in 1973.

In 1961, Gordon B. Hinckley, and a small gathering of members at the Manila American Cemetery, marked the church's more formal beginning in the Philippines.

The first temple in the country was dedicated in 1984, along with a local missionary training center, and through the 1990s church membership grew to over a quarter of a million members. As of 2021, the church reported more than 825,000 members in 1,250 congregations, 23 missions, two dedicated temples, with five more temples announced or under construction.

=== Temple announcement ===
During the church's general conference on October 7, 2018, church president Russell M. Nelson announced the intent to build a temple in Davao, Philippines. The announcement included 11 other temples, with ten of them being outside the continental United States. The Philippines then included approximately 800,000 church members in more than 1,200 congregations.

=== Site and design ===
On September 8, 2020, the church announced the temple's location and an architectural rendering. Plans called for constructing the temple at Ma-a Road and Anahaw Road in Barangay Ma-a, requiring demolition of an existing meetinghouse. The temple is on 2.7 acres at the intersection of Ma-a Road and Anahaw Road in Barangay Ma-a, Davao City. The site includes the temple, a replacement meetinghouse, and housing for temple patrons and leadership. The two-level structure is approximately 18,450 square feet, with a two-tier steeple with eight arched windows positioned on each side of both levels.

=== Groundbreaking ===
A groundbreaking ceremony occurred on November 14, 2020. COVID-19 pandemic protocols restricted attendance to a small invited group, dividing the ceremony between the temple site and a nearby meetinghouse. Taniela B. Wakolo, a general authority and Philippines Area president, led the proceedings. His wife, Anita, and his counselors, Steven R. Bangerter and Yoon Hwan Choi, plus local interfaith representatives also attended. The gathering took place near Mount Apo, which is the highest mountain in the Philippines. Wakolo's dedicatory prayer expressed hope that the temple would bless local residents and passersby by bringing them peace and hope through Christ, even during construction.

=== Open house and dedication ===
On December 1, 2025, the church announced dates for the temple's opening activities. Media representatives toured the temple on March 23, 2026, followed by invited guests on March 24–25, 2026. Public tours then occurred from March 26 through April 10, 2026, except Sundays. Dale G. Renlund, of the Quorum of the Twelve Apostles, dedicated the temple on May 3, 2026.

== Leadership and admittance ==
The church's temples are directed by a temple president and matron, each typically serving for a term of three years. The president and matron oversee the administration of temple operations and provide guidance and training for both temple patrons and staff. Edgar Cocon Cabrera and Jocelyn Dulos Saromines Cabrera will serve as the first president and matron.

Like all the church's temples, it is not used for Sunday worship services. To members of the church, temples are regarded as sacred houses of the Lord. Once dedicated, only church members with a current temple recommend can enter for worship.

== See also ==
- The Church of Jesus Christ of Latter-day Saints in the Philippines
- Comparison of temples (LDS Church)
- List of temples (LDS Church)
- List of temples by geographic region (LDS Church)
- Religion in the Philippines
- Temple architecture (LDS Church)

Temples in the Philippines
= Operating
= Under construction
= Announced
= Temporarily Closed
