= Urdaneta Park Landmark Monument =

Memorial monument in Pangasinan, Philippines

- The monument in 2018
- Location: Fray Andres de Urdaneta Park, Urdaneta, Pangasinan
- Coordinates: 16°00′14″N 120°34′34.4″E
- Designer: Napoleon Abueva; Abdulmari Imao; Ildefonso Santos; Alejandro Roces
- Type: Memorial
- Height: 3.66 metres (12.0 ft)
- Opening date: 2009
- Dedicated to: Andrés de Urdaneta

The Urdaneta Park Landmark Monument is a memorial in the city of Urdaneta in Pangasinan, Philippines. It is dedicated to Spanish maritime explorer, Andrés de Urdaneta who is also the namesake of the city. It is the centerpiece of the Fray Andres de Urdaneta Park which is situated in front of the Urdaneta City Hall in Barangay Anonas.

Sculptors Napoleon Abueva and Abdulmari Imao, landscape artist Ildefonso Santos and writer Alejandro Roces where involved in the creation of the monument. All four are already recognized as National Artists of the Philippines at the time of the monument's conception. Ben Cabrera also contributed a mural for the Urdaneta Park. The monument was unveiled in 2009.
