= Harare Zimbabwe Temple =

Temple of The Church of Jesus Christ of Latter-day Saints

- Interactive map of Harare Zimbabwe Temple
- Number: 214
- Dedication: 1 March 2026, by Gerrit W. Gong
- Site: 6.7 acres (2.7 ha)
- Floor area: 17,250 ft^{2} (1,603 m^{2})
- Official website • News & images

Church chronology
← Alabang Philippines Temple	Harare Zimbabwe Temple	→ Davao Philippines Temple

Additional information
- Announced: 3 April 2016, by Thomas S. Monson
- Groundbreaking: 12 December 2020, by Edward Dube
- Open house: 22 January-7 February 2025
- Current president: Dunstan G.B.T. Chadambuka
- Location: Harare, Zimbabwe
- Coordinates: 17°48′14″S 31°04′57″E
- Baptistries: 1
- Ordinance rooms: 2
- Sealing rooms: 2

The Harare Zimbabwe Temple is a temple of the Church of Jesus Christ of Latter-day Saints in Harare, Zimbabwe. At the time of its announcement, it was the country's first temple and the ninth on the African continent. A groundbreaking was held on December 12, 2020, with Edward Dube, of the presidency of the church's Africa South Area, presiding. Zimbabwe's president, Emmerson Mnangagwa, attended the groundbreaking and gave brief remarks.

Built on a 6.7-acre site at 65 Enterprise Road in Harare’s Highlands, the single-spired, single-story building is approximately 17,250 square feet. With construction nearing completion, in August 2025 the church announced a public open house scheduled from January 22 to February 7, 2026 (excluding Sundays). The temple is scheduled to be dedicated on March 1, 2026, by Gerrit W. Gong of the Quorum of the Twelve Apostles. The temple will serve more than 46,000 Latter-day Saints in Zimbabwe.

== History ==
Church president Thomas S. Monson announced plans to build a temple in Harare on April 3, 2016, during general conference.

On October 1, 2020, the church released a rendering and noted the temple would be on a 6.7-acre site at 65 Enterprise Road in the Highlands neighborhood of Harare.

The groundbreaking was held on December 12, 2020, with Edward Dube, a church general authority, presiding. Zimbabwe's president, Emmerson Mnangagwa, also attended. In brief remarks, he shared gratitude to the church inviting him, and commented on the groundbreaking's December timing, when most Christians celebrate the birth of Jesus Christ. Church president Russell M. Nelson visited Harare in 2018, and told church members: “You deserve a temple here in Harare… I want to be here to see that happen”, adding that the temple was the place where the highest of God’s blessings are given to His faithful children.

On August 18, 2025, the church announced dates for a media day (January 19, 2026), invited-guest tours (January 20–21, 2026), and the public open house (January 22–February 7, 2026; excluding Sundays), with dedication scheduled for March 1, 2026.

== Design and architecture ==
The temple is a single-story building of approximately 17,250-square-foot with a tan-colored exterior and rectangular windows. A rectangular tower on a square base rises to a white spire above the main entrance. The temple stands on a 6.7-acre plot at 65 Enterprise Road, Highlands (Harare), with walkways and flower gardens designed to provide views to and from the entry and adjacent meetinghouse on the campus.

It has a light tan exterior envelope with rectangular windows and a single spire. The temple has two instruction rooms, two sealing rooms, and a baptistry.

== Temple leadership and admittance ==
The church's temples are directed by a temple president and matron, each typically serving for a term of three years. The president and matron oversee the administration of temple operations and provide guidance and training for both temple patrons and staff. Dunstan G.B.T. Chadambuka has been announced as the first president, with Pertunia Chadambuka to serve as the matron.

=== Admittance and worship ===
A public open house is scheduled from January 22 to February 7, 2026 (excluding Sundays). Gerrit W. Gong is scheduled to dedicate the temple on March 1, 2026. Like all the church's temples, it is not used for Sunday worship services. To members of the church, temples are regarded as sacred houses of the Lord. Once dedicated, only church members with a current temple recommend can enter for worship.

== See also ==
- The Church of Jesus Christ of Latter-day Saints in Zimbabwe
- Comparison of temples of The Church of Jesus Christ of Latter-day Saints
- List of temples of The Church of Jesus Christ of Latter-day Saints
- List of temples of The Church of Jesus Christ of Latter-day Saints by geographic region
- Temple architecture (Latter-day Saints)
- Religion in Zimbabwe
