= Lindon Utah Temple =

LDS Church temple

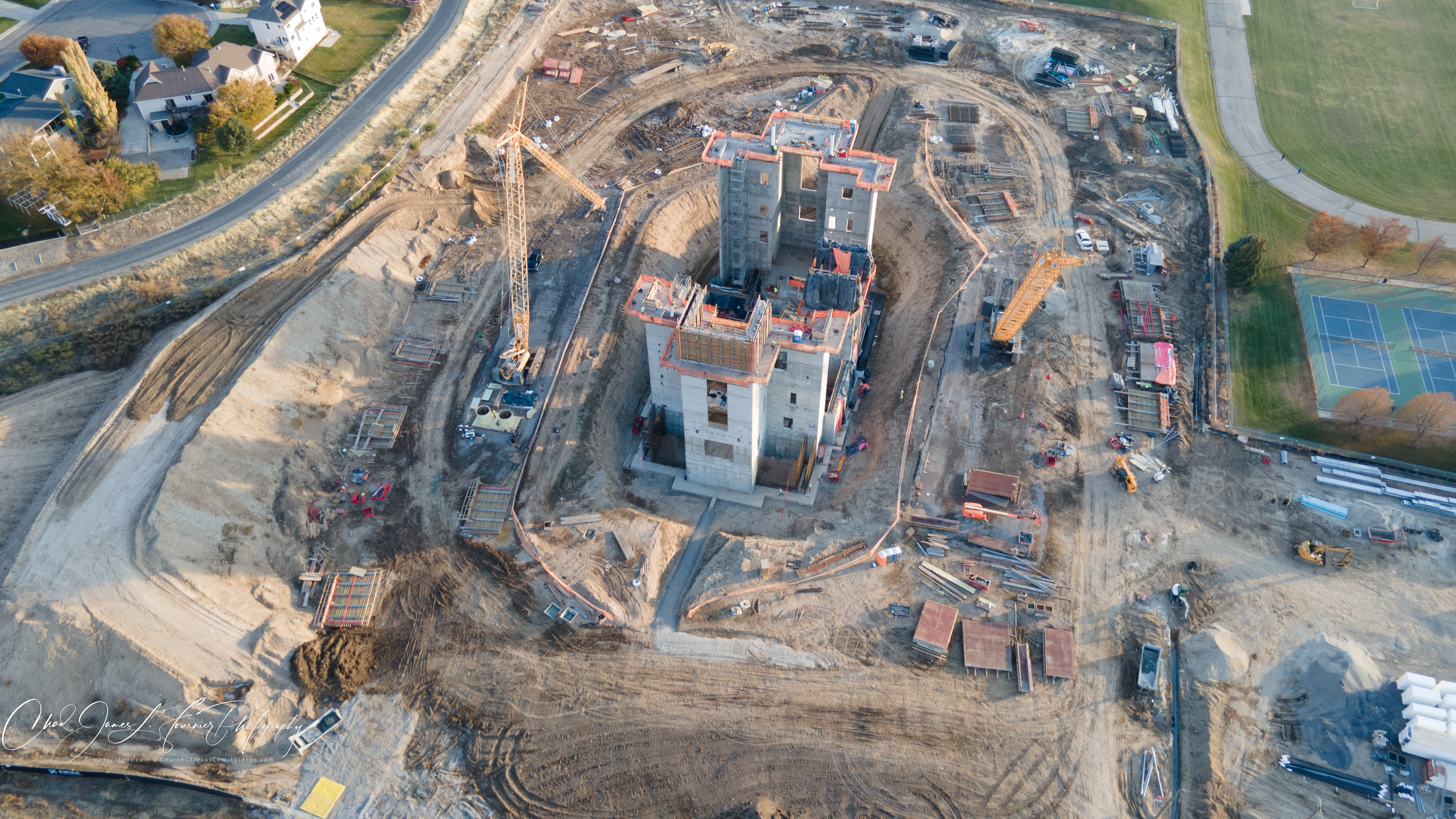
- Interactive map of Lindon Utah Temple
- Number: 216
- Dedication: 3 May 2026, by Henry B. Eyring
- Site: 12.63 acres (5.11 ha)
- Floor area: 83,140 ft^{2} (7,724 m^{2})
- Official website • News & images

Church chronology
← Davao Philippines Temple	Lindon Utah Temple	→ Bacolod Philippines Temple

Additional information
- Announced: 4 October 2020, by Russell M. Nelson
- Groundbreaking: 23 April 2022, by Kevin W. Pearson
- Open house: 12 March-11 April 2026
- Location: Lindon, Utah, United States
- Coordinates: 40.3369°N 111.6955°W
- Baptistries: 2
- Ordinance rooms: 4
- Sealing rooms: 4

The Lindon Utah Temple is a temple of the Church of Jesus Christ of Latter-day Saints in Lindon, Utah. The intent to build the temple was announced on October 4, 2020, by church president Russell M. Nelson during general conference. It is the 25th temple in Utah and seventh in Utah County. The three-story, 81,000-square-foot structure was designed by MHTN Architects and has white granite cladding, twin towers, and arched windows. A groundbreaking ceremony was held on April 23, 2022, with Kevin W. Pearson, a church general authority, presiding. The temple was dedicated on May 3, 2026, by Henry B. Eyring, first counselor in the church's First Presidency.

== History ==
The intent to construct the Lindon Utah Temple was announced by church president Russell M. Nelson on October 4, 2020, during general conference. It is be the 25th temple in Utah and the seventh in Utah County. On December 21, 2020, the church announced that the temple would be constructed on an 14-acre property located near the intersection of 800 East and Center Street in Lindon. Preliminary plans were for a three-story structure of approximately 81,000 square feet.

The groundbreaking ceremony took place on April 23, 2022, marking the commencement of construction. This ceremony was presided over by Kevin W. Pearson, a general authority and president of the church’s Utah Area. It was attended by local church members and community leaders. Due to inclement weather, the ceremony was moved from the temple site to a nearby meetinghouse, but the ceremony of turning the dirt was still held outside.

== Design and architecture ==
The temple was designed by MHTN Architects on a 14-acre plot near the intersection of 800 East and Center Street in Lindon. The site was previously used as residential land and farmland. A gathering area for wedding parties to take photos was designed with Mount Timpanogas in the background. A 1,500-square-foot maintenance building is also on the site.

The city of Lindon was named after a Linden tree that the city was built around, although the spelling eventually changed due to a typo. The temple will have a motif of the Linden tree, one of which will be in art glass.

The temple has three stories and is approximately 81,000 square feet, and the exterior uses white granite. It has two rectangular towers, each anchored by square bases, and rows of tall, arched windows.

== Temple presidents and admittance ==
The church's temples are directed by a temple president and matron, each typically serving for a term of three years. The president and matron oversee the administration of temple operations and provide guidance and training for both temple patrons and staff.

The temple's first president is Lynn M. Brätt, with Elizabeth A. Brätt serving as matron.

Like all the church's temples, it is not used for Sunday worship services. To members of the church, temples are regarded as sacred houses of the Lord. Once dedicated, only church members with a current temple recommend can enter for worship.

== See also ==
- The Church of Jesus Christ of Latter-day Saints in Utah
- Comparison of temples (LDS Church)
- List of temples (LDS Church)
- List of temples by geographic region (LDS Church)
- Temple architecture (LDS Church)
