= The Church of Jesus Christ of Latter-day Saints in the Philippines =

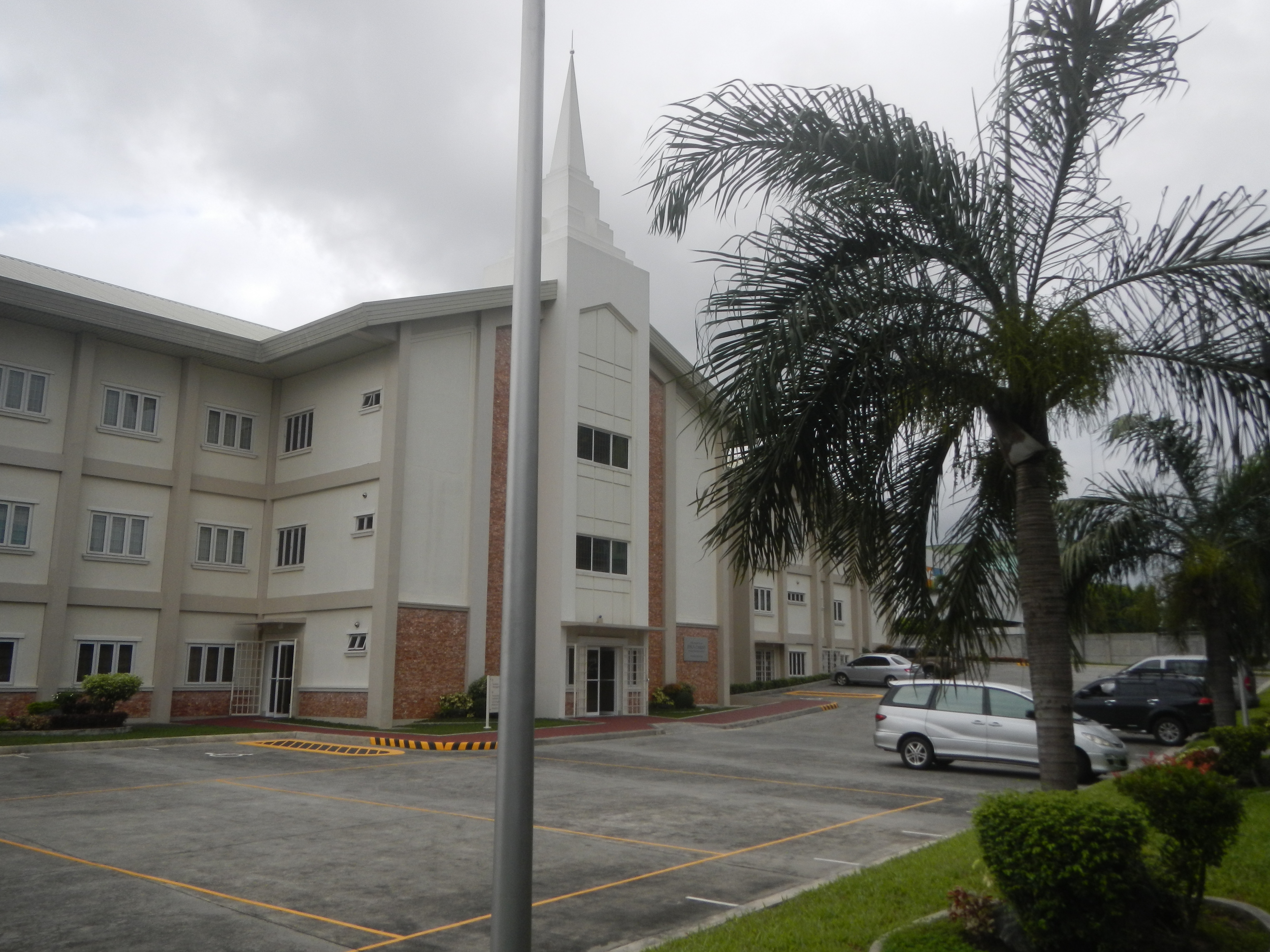
- Church Building along Aurora Boulevard in Quezon City. It houses a Family History Center, LDS Employment Resource Center, Philippines Quezon City Mission Office, Seminaries and Institutes of Religion, Stake offices as well as a meetinghouse.
- Area: Philippines
- Members: 905,082 (2025)
- Stakes: 141
- Districts: 49
- Wards: 890
- Branches: 480
- Total congregations: 1,370
- Missions: 26
- Temples: 6 operating; 2 under construction; 6 announced; 14 total
- FamilySearch Centers: 192

The Church of Jesus Christ of Latter-day Saints (LDS Church; Filipino: Ang Simbahan ni Jesucristo ng mga Banal sa mga Huling Araw) in the Philippines refers to the organization and its members in the Philippines.

The Philippines ranks as having the most church members and members per capita among Asian countries and the fourth most members worldwide.

== History ==
Membership in the Philippines
Year	Membership
1960	11
1970	4,603
1979	33,218
1989*	213,000
1999	441,359
2009	631,885
2019	805,209
2025	905,082
*Membership was published as an estimated or rounded number. Source: Windall J. Ashton; Jim M. Wall, Deseret News, various years, Church Almanac Country Information: The Philippines

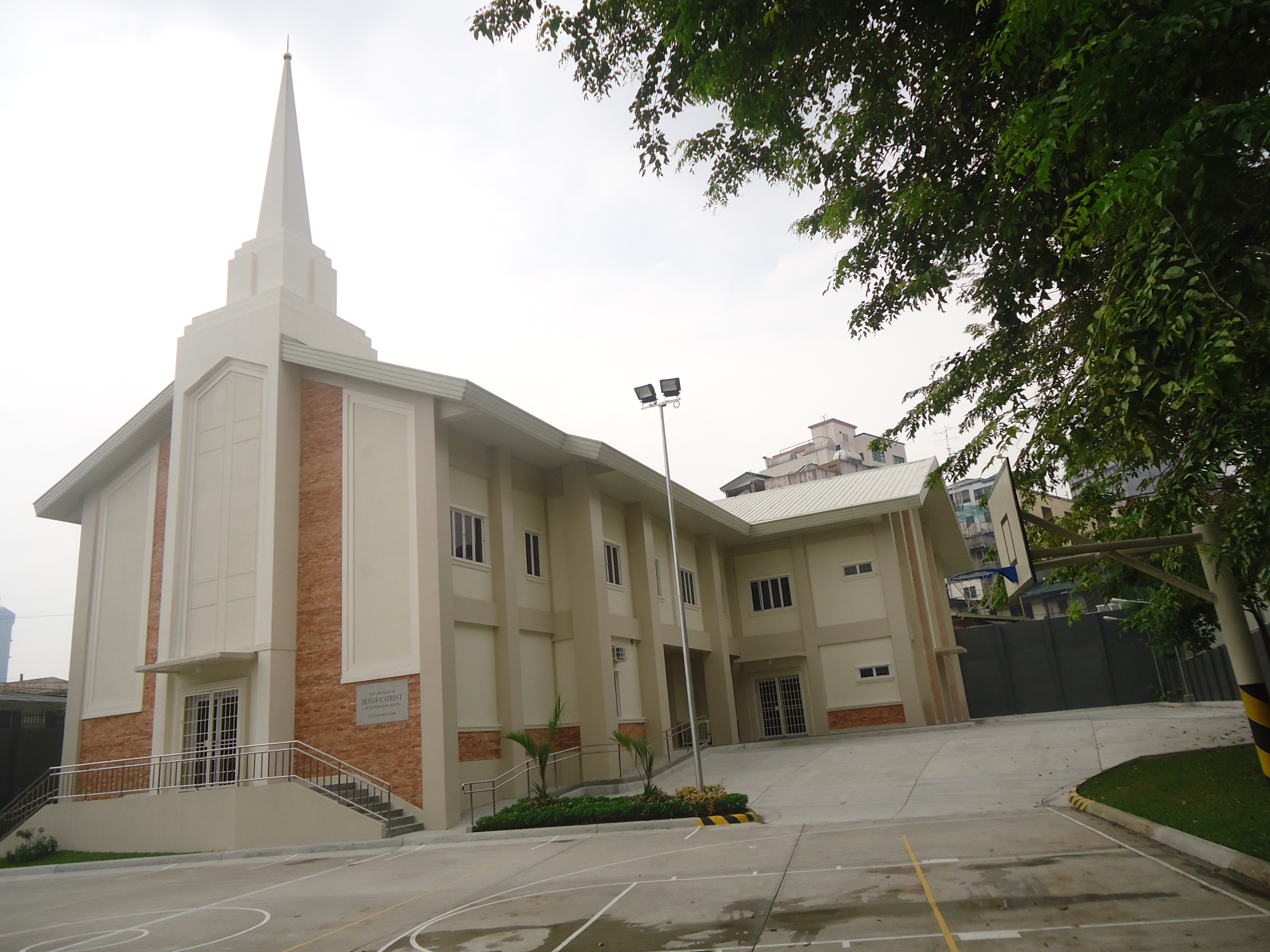
A meetinghouse in Guadalupe, Makati, Philippines

The first contact the church had with the Philippines was in 1898 during the Spanish–American War. Two church members, Willard Call and George Seaman, who were part of the United States artillery battery, were set apart as missionaries and began to proselytize after being deployed to the Philippines. However, they met with little success. Active proselytizing stopped at the onset of World War II.

The first Filipino to join the LDS Church was Aniceta Pabilona Fajardo in 1945, who was introduced to the church by Maxine Grimm, who was in the Philippines with the Red Cross in the aftermath of World War II.

The Luzon Serviceman's District was organized during the Korean War under the Japanese Mission for American servicemen stationed in the Philippines. In August 1955, the district was then transferred to the newly organized Southern Far East Mission, under the direction of Joseph Fielding Smith, a member of the Quorum of the Twelve. During this time, Smith visited the Philippines. Due to legal issues, the LDS Church could not send missionaries to the country. Missionary work, however, was done by Latter-day Saint servicemen and American residents, including Kendall B. Schaefermeyer, a returned missionary serving in the U.S. Navy. He had baptized four Filipinos by October 1957 and was teaching more than 20 others.

During 1960, Gordon B. Hinckley, then an Assistant to the Twelve, and apostle Ezra Taft Benson, visited the Philippines. The purpose of the visit was mainly to see the work of the servicemen groups, but they brought back encouraging reports of the missionary work being done among the native Filipinos.

The church obtained official recognition in the Philippines in 1961 when Robert S. Taylor, president of the Southern Far East Mission, filed the paperwork with the Philippine government. Subsequently, on 28 April 1961 in a meeting with servicemen, American residents, and Filipino members, Hinckley rededicated the country. The first American missionaries (Ray Goodson, Harry Murray, Kent Lowe and Nestor Ledesma) arrived in Manila two months later. One of the first converts after official recognition was the family of José Gutierez, Sr. By the end of 1961, six more were baptized.

Due to growth that followed, the Philippines was organized into its own mission by 1967, with Paul S. Rose as the first president. In 1969, the church spread across the islands, having the highest amount of baptisms compared to every other area of the world. This led to the division of the Philippines Mission in 1974 into the Philippines Manila and Philippines Cebu City missions.

The first stake in the Philippines was created in Manila on 20 May 1973. In September 2017, the number of stakes in the Philippines reached 100, only the fifth nation in the world to reach that milestone.

While serving as church president, Spencer W. Kimball presided over two area conferences, one in 1975 and another in 1980. During the area conference in 1980, Kimball met with then-President Ferdinand Marcos at Malacañang Palace. In 1987, Manila became the headquarters of the church's Philippines/Micronesia Area.

Augusto A. Lim, the first Filipino general authority, was called to the Second Quorum of Seventy in June 1992.

In 1987, the Book of Mormon was translated into Tagalog by Ricardo Cruz, with the assistance of Posidio Ocampo and Ananias Bala in the final stages of production. Since then, the Book of Mormon has been translated to several other languages of the Philippines.

On June 30, 2021, the LDS Church broke ground for Asia's first "For the Strength of Youth (FSY) Camp" located in Tanay, Rizal, near Manila. It opened on June 7, 2023.

== Notable people ==
- Lani Misalucha, singer dubbed as "Asia's Nightingale" by MTV Southeast Asia.
- Eric Tai, a Tongan actor from New Zealand, model, TV host, comedian, and rugby union player who played for the Alabang Eagles and represented the Philippines national rugby union team in 15s and 7s.
- Jairus Aquino, a Filipino actor best known for his roles in Super Inggo, Kung Fu Kids, and Luv U.
- Xia Vigor, Filipina child actress

== Stakes and districts ==
Stake/District	Organized	Mission	Temple
Agoo Philippines Stake	22 Feb 2004	Philippines Baguio	Urdaneta Philippines
Aguilar Philippines Stake	9 Dec 2001	Philippines Lingayen	Urdaneta Philippines
Alaminos Philippines Stake	2 Nov 2025	Philippines Lingayen	Urdaneta Philippines
Alicia Philippines Stake	22 Jun 1987	Philippines Cauayan	Urdaneta Philippines
Angeles Philippines Stake	18 Jan 1981	Philippines Angeles	Manila Philippines
Antipolo Philippines Stake	31 Aug 1997	Philippines Antipolo	Manila Philippines
Antique Philippines District	22 Jul 1990	Philippines Iloilo	Bacolod Philippines
Aparri Philippines Stake	4 Dec 1988	Philippines Tuguegarao	Urdaneta Philippines
Argao Philippines District	9 Jun 2024	Philippines Cebu	Cebu City Philippines
Bacolod Philippines North Stake	7 Feb 1982	Philippines Bacolod	Bacolod Philippines
Bacolod Philippines South Stake	4 Jun 2000	Philippines Bacolod	Bacolod Philippines
Bacolod Philippines Stake	5 Jul 1981	Philippines Bacolod	Bacolod Philippines
Bacoor Philippines Stake	9 Dec 2012	Philippines Cavite	Alabang Philippines
Bago Philippines Stake	20 Jan 2002	Philippines Bacolod	Bacolod Philippines
Baguio Philippines Stake	17 Nov 1985	Philippines Baguio	Urdaneta Philippines
Balanga Philippines Stake	7 Jul 1991	Philippines Olongapo	Manila Philippines
Balayan Philippines District	13 Dec 1992	Philippines Lipa	Alabang Philippines
Baler Philippines District	18 Oct 2009	Philippines Cabanatuan	Urdaneta Philippines
Balingasag Philippines District	18 Apr 1999	Philippines Cagayan de Oro	Davao Philippines
Baliwag Philippines Stake	2 May 2004	Philippines Quezon City North	Manila Philippines
Ballesteros Philippines Stake	16 Feb 2003	Philippines Laoag	Urdaneta Philippines
Bambang Philippines District	29 Dec 2002	Philippines Cauayan	Urdaneta Philippines
Bangued Philippines District	17 Jun 2001	Philippines Baguio	Urdaneta Philippines
Bangui Philippines District	11 Aug 2002	Philippines Laoag	Urdaneta Philippines
Batac Philippines Stake	23 Mar 1997	Philippines Laoag	Urdaneta Philippines
Batangas Philippines Stake	9 Jun 2019	Philippines Lipa	Alabang Philippines
Bauang Philippines District	30 Nov 2003	Philippines Baguio	Urdaneta Philippines
Bayambang Philippines Stake	5 Jun 1997	Philippines Lingayen	Urdaneta Philippines
Baybay Philippines District	12 Mar 1990	Philippines Ormoc	Cebu City Philippines
Biliran Philippines District	11 Feb 2001	Philippines Ormoc	Cebu City Philippines
Binalbagan Philippines Stake	3 Mar 1991	Philippines Bacolod	Bacolod Philippines
Bislig Philippines District	27 Oct 1987	Philippines Butuan	Davao Philippines
Bocaue Philippines Stake	7 Dec 2025	Philippines Quezon City North	Manila Philippines
Bogo Philippines District	6 Dec 1994	Philippines Cebu	Cebu City Philippines
Bongabon Philippines District	12 Sep 2004	Philippines Cabanatuan	Urdaneta Philippines
Borongan Philippines District	27 Feb 1996	Philippines Tacloban	Cebu City Philippines
Bulan Philippines District	17 Jun 1990	Philippines Legazpi	Alabang Philippines
Butuan Philippines Stake	19 Feb 1989	Philippines Butuan	Davao Philippines
Butuan Philippines West Stake	25 Oct 2026	Philippines Butuan	Davao Philippines
Cabanatuan Philippines Stake	9 May 1982	Philippines Cabanatuan	Urdaneta Philippines
Cadiz Philippines Stake	10 Nov 1985	Philippines Bacolod	Bacolod Philippines
Cagayan de Oro Philippines East Stake	6 May 1990	Philippines Cagayan de Oro	Davao Philippines
Cagayan de Oro Philippines Stake	26 May 1985	Philippines Cagayan de Oro	Davao Philippines
Cagayan de Oro Philippines West Stake	16 May 1999	Philippines Cagayan de Oro	Davao Philippines
Calamba Philippines Stake	26 Mar 1992	Philippines Lipa	Alabang Philippines
Calape Philippines District	3 Mar 1995	Philippines Cebu East	Cebu City Philippines
Calasiao Philippines Stake	9 Dec 2001	Philippines Urdaneta	Urdaneta Philippines
Caloocan Philippines Stake	22 Feb 1981	Philippines Quezon City	Manila Philippines
Camarin Philippines Stake	5 May 2019	Philippines Quezon City North	Manila Philippines
Camiling Philippines Stake	3 Aug 2003	Philippines Lingayen	Urdaneta Philippines
Candon Philippines Stake	23 Mar 1997	Philippines Baguio	Urdaneta Philippines
Carigara Philippines Stake	23 Jan 1996	Philippines Ormoc	Cebu City Philippines
Catanduanes Philippines District	19 Nov 2000	Philippines Legazpi	Alabang Philippines
Catarman Philippines Stake	11 May 2008	Philippines Tacloban	Cebu City Philippines
Catbalogan Philippines District	23 Nov 1981	Philippines Tacloban	Cebu City Philippines
Cauayan Philippines Stake	17 Nov 1996	Philippines Cauayan	Urdaneta Philippines
Cavite Philippines Stake	17 Aug 1985	Philippines Cavite	Alabang Philippines
Cebu City Philippines Stake	11 Jan 1981	Philippines Cebu	Cebu City Philippines
Cebu Philippines Central Stake	27 Aug 2000	Philippines Cebu	Cebu City Philippines
Cebu Philippines Consolacion Stake	8 Sep 2013	Philippines Cebu East	Cebu City Philippines
Cebu Philippines Liloan Stake	17 Oct 1999	Philippines Cebu East	Cebu City Philippines
Cotabato Philippines District	12 Feb 1995	Philippines General Santos	Davao Philippines
Daet Philippines Stake	30 Apr 2000	Philippines Naga	Alabang Philippines
Dagupan Philippines Stake	25 Jan 1981	Philippines Urdaneta	Urdaneta Philippines
Dasmariñas Philippines Stake	5 Nov 1989	Philippines Cavite	Alabang Philippines
Davao Philippines Buhangin Stake	17 Aug 1985	Philippines Davao	Davao Philippines
Davao Philippines Stake	15 Nov 1981	Philippines Davao	Davao Philippines
Davao Philippines West Stake	14 Sep 2014	Philippines Davao	Davao Philippines
Digos Philippines Stake	31 May 1992	Philippines General Santos	Davao Philippines
Dipolog Philippines District	11 Oct 1987	Philippines Ozamiz	Davao Philippines
Dumaguete Philippines Stake	17 Jan 1982	Philippines Dumaguete	Bacolod Philippines
Escalante Philippines Stake	23 Oct 1994	Philippines Dumaguete	Bacolod Philippines
Fairview Philippines Stake	11 Jun 2000	Philippines Quezon City	Manila Philippines
Gapan Philippines Stake	17 May 1998	Philippines Cabanatuan	Urdaneta Philippines
General Santos Philippines Stake	6 Aug 1995	Philippines General Santos	Davao Philippines
Gingoog Philippines Stake	7 Jun 2026	Philippines Butuan	Davao Philippines
Goa Philippines Stake	28 May 2000	Philippines Naga	Alabang Philippines
Gonzaga Philippines District	20 Nov 2005	Philippines Tuguegarao	Urdaneta Philippines
Hinunangan Philippines District	1 Jan 2017	Philippines Ormoc	Cebu City Philippines
Iba Philippines Stake	29 May 1983	Philippines Olongapo	Urdaneta Philippines
Ilagan Philippines Stake	10 Dec 2000	Philippines Tuguegarao	Urdaneta Philippines
Iligan Philippines Stake	18 Oct 1992	Philippines Cagayan de Oro	Davao Philippines
Iloilo Philippines Central Stake	5 Feb 2023	Philippines Iloilo	Bacolod Philippines
Iloilo Philippines North Stake	9 Mar 1997	Philippines Iloilo	Bacolod Philippines
Iloilo Philippines Stake	20 Jan 1985	Philippines Iloilo	Bacolod Philippines
Imus Philippines Stake	21 Mar 2021	Philippines Cavite	Alabang Philippines
Iriga Philippines Stake	7 Jan 1992	Philippines Naga	Alabang Philippines
Jordan Philippines District	22 Dec 2013	Philippines Iloilo	Bacolod Philippines
Kalibo Philippines Stake	5 Mar 2000	Philippines Iloilo	Bacolod Philippines
Kidapawan Philippines District	19 Feb 1995	Philippines General Santos	Davao Philippines
La Carlota Philippines District	4 Jul 2004	Philippines Bacolod	Bacolod Philippines
Laoag Philippines Stake	23 Apr 1989	Philippines Laoag	Urdaneta Philippines
Lapu-Lapu Philippines Stake	19 May 2024	Philippines Cebu East	Cebu City Philippines
Las Piñas Philippines Stake	15 Sep 1985	Philippines Puerto Princesa	Alabang Philippines
Legazpi Philippines Stake	19 Aug 1985	Philippines Legazpi	Alabang Philippines
Ligao Philippines District	30 May 1993	Philippines Legazpi	Alabang Philippines
Lingayen Philippines Stake	22 Sep 1985	Philippines Lingayen	Urdaneta Philippines
Lipa Philippines Stake	1 Jul 2001	Philippines Lipa	Alabang Philippines
Lopez Philippines Stake	16 Mar 2003	Philippines San Pablo	Alabang Philippines
Lubao Philippines Stake	5 Jul 1998	Philippines Olongapo	Manila Philippines
Lucena Philippines Stake	5 Jan 1988	Philippines San Pablo	Alabang Philippines
Mabalacat Philippines Stake	30 Aug 2015	Philippines Angeles	Urdaneta Philippines
Makati Philippines East Stake	22 May 2011	Philippines Manila	Manila Philippines
Makati Philippines Stake	29 May 1977	Philippines Manila	Manila Philippines
Malaybalay Philippines Stake	16 Feb 1992	Philippines Cagayan de Oro	Davao Philippines
Malolos Philippines Stake	11 Jun 1989	Philippines Quezon City North	Manila Philippines
Mandaluyong Philippines Stake	10 Sep 2017	Philippines Manila	Manila Philippines
Mandaue Philippines Stake	19 Nov 1989	Philippines Cebu East	Cebu City Philippines
Mangaldan Philippines Stake	17 Aug 2003	Philippines Urdaneta	Urdaneta Philippines
Manila Philippines Stake	20 May 1973	Philippines Manila	Manila Philippines
Marbel Philippines Stake	30 Nov 2025	Philippines General Santos	Davao Philippines
Marikina Philippines East Stake	23 May 2021	Philippines Antipolo	Manila Philippines
Marikina Philippines Stake	30 Nov 1980	Philippines Quezon City	Manila Philippines
Masbate Philippines District	8 Nov 1994	Philippines Legazpi	Cebu City Philippines
Mati Philippines Stake	15 Mar 1988	Philippines Davao	Davao Philippines
Mindoro Oriental Philippines District	18 Aug 1991	Philippines Lipa	Alabang Philippines
Monkayo Philippines District	3 Sep 1992	Philippines Davao	Davao Philippines
Montalban Philippines Stake	4 Jun 2000	Philippines Quezon City	Manila Philippines
Morong Rizal Philippines Stake	23 Mar 1992	Philippines Antipolo	Manila Philippines
Munoz Philippines Stake	10 Aug 2025	Philippines Cabanatuan	Urdaneta Philippines
Naga Philippines North Stake	6 Nov 2022	Philippines Naga	Alabang Philippines
Naga Philippines Stake	18 Aug 1985	Philippines Naga	Alabang Philippines
Naic Philippines Stake	25 Oct 1991	Philippines Cavite	Alabang Philippines
Narra Philippines District	10 Mar 1996	Philippines Puerto Princesa	Alabang Philippines
Novaliches Philippines Stake	7 Sep 1997	Philippines Quezon City North	Manila Philippines
Olongapo Philippines Stake	23 Jul 1978	Philippines Olongapo	Urdaneta Philippines
Orion Philippines Stake	14 Feb 1988	Philippines Olongapo	Manila Philippines
Ormoc Philippines Stake	27 Jun 1999	Philippines Ormoc	Cebu City Philippines
Oroquieta Philippines Stake	20 Apr 1997	Philippines Ozamiz	Davao Philippines
Ozamiz Philippines District	7 Nov 1993	Philippines Ozamiz	Davao Philippines
Pagadian Philippines District	6 Nov 1977	Philippines Ozamiz	Davao Philippines
Panabo Philippines Stake	31 Jan 1993	Philippines Davao	Davao Philippines
Pandan Philippines District	14 Apr 2024	Philippines Iloilo	Bacolod Philippines
Paniqui Philippines Stake	30 Aug 1992	Philippines Angeles	Urdaneta Philippines
Parañaque Philippines Stake	22 Nov 1981	Philippines Puerto Princesa	Alabang Philippines
Pasay Philippines Stake	25 Jan 1998	Philippines Manila	Manila Philippines
Pasig Philippines Stake	15 Sep 1985	Philippines Antipolo	Manila Philippines
Puerto Princesa Philippines Stake	1 May 1987	Philippines Puerto Princesa	Alabang Philippines
Quezon City Philippines South Stake	30 Nov 1997	Philippines Quezon City	Manila Philippines
Quezon City Philippines Stake	29 May 1977	Philippines Quezon City	Manila Philippines
Quezon Philippines Palawan District	29 Sep 2019	Philippines Puerto Princesa	Alabang Philippines
Rosales Philippines Stake	10 Mar 1996	Philippines Urdaneta	Urdaneta Philippines
Roxas Capiz Philippines Stake	12 Mar 2000	Philippines Iloilo	Bacolod Philippines
Roxas Philippines Isabela Stake	18 Oct 2026	Philippines Cauayan	Urdaneta Philippines
Sablayan Philippines District	15 Dec 2024	Philippines Lipa	Alabang Philippines
Sagay Philippines Stake	28 Jun 2009	Philippines Dumaguete	Bacolod Philippines
San Antonio Philippines Stake	6 Sep 1993	Philippines Olongapo	Urdaneta Philippines
San Carlos Philippines District	7 Sep 1989	Philippines Dumaguete	Bacolod Philippines
San Fernando La Union Philippines Stake	6 Dec 1981	Philippines Baguio	Urdaneta Philippines
San Francisco Philippines Stake	14 Feb 1999	Philippines Butuan	Davao Philippines
San Gabriel Philippines Stake	20 Jun 1993	Philippines Cavite	Alabang Philippines
San Jose del Monte Philippines North Stake	18 Jun 2017	Philippines Quezon City North	Manila Philippines
San Jose del Monte Philippines Stake	16 Jan 1992	Philippines Quezon City North	Manila Philippines
San Jose Mindoro Philippines Occidental District	8 Nov 1998	Philippines Lipa	Alabang Philippines
San Jose Nueva Ecija Philippines Stake	10 May 1998	Philippines Cabanatuan	Urdaneta Philippines
San Pablo Philippines Stake	20 Aug 1985	Philippines San Pablo	Alabang Philippines
Santa Cruz Laguna Philippines Stake	31 May 1992	Philippines San Pablo	Alabang Philippines
Santa Cruz Marinduque Philippines District	18 Apr 1993	Philippines San Pablo	Alabang Philippines
Santa Cruz Zambales Philippines Stake	17 Dec 1990	Philippines Olongapo	Urdaneta Philippines
Santa Ignacia Philippines Stake	2 Dec 2001	Philippines Angeles	Urdaneta Philippines
Santa Rosa Philippines Stake	2 Nov 2025	Philippines Lipa	Alabang Philippines
Santiago Philippines North Stake	16 Oct 2011	Philippines Cauayan	Urdaneta Philippines
Santiago Philippines Stake	22 Mar 1998	Philippines Cauayan	Urdaneta Philippines
Siniloan Philippines Stake	31 May 1992	Philippines Antipolo	Manila Philippines
Sipalay Philippines District	30 Apr 2000	Philippines Dumaguete	Bacolod Philippines
Sipocot Philippines Stake	12 Nov 2000	Philippines Naga	Alabang Philippines
Sogod Philippines District	28 Jan 2007	Philippines Ormoc	Cebu City Philippines
Solano Philippines District	23 Jun 1983	Philippines Cauayan	Urdaneta Philippines
Sorsogon Philippines District	1 May 1987	Philippines Legazpi	Alabang Philippines
Surigao Philippines District	26 Aug 1983	Philippines Butuan	Davao Philippines
Tabaco Philippines District	18 Jun 1995	Philippines Legazpi	Alabang Philippines
Tacloban Philippines Stake	13 May 2007	Philippines Tacloban	Cebu City Philippines
Tagbilaran Philippines Stake	2 Jun 1982	Philippines Cebu East	Cebu City Philippines
Taguig Philippines Stake	15 Jun 2014	Philippines Manila	Manila Philippines
Tagum Philippines Stake	31 Jan 1993	Philippines Davao	Davao Philippines
Talisay Philippines Stake	21 Mar 1982	Philippines Cebu	Cebu City Philippines
Tanjay Philippines District	11 Nov 1990	Philippines Dumaguete	Bacolod Philippines
Tarlac Philippines South Stake	24 Aug 2025	Philippines Angeles	Urdaneta Philippines
Tarlac Philippines Stake	13 Dec 1981	Philippines Angeles	Urdaneta Philippines
Taytay Philippines Stake	18 Jan 1998	Philippines Antipolo	Manila Philippines
Toledo Philippines Stake	17 Aug 1990	Philippines Cebu	Cebu City Philippines
Tolosa Philippines Stake	22 Jan 1989	Philippines Tacloban	Cebu City Philippines
Tubod Philippines Stake	10 Mar 2024	Philippines Butuan	Davao Philippines
Tuguegarao Philippines North Stake	21 May 1989	Philippines Tuguegarao	Urdaneta Philippines
Tuguegarao Philippines South Stake	30 Oct 2011	Philippines Tuguegarao	Urdaneta Philippines
Tumauini Philippines Stake	17 Nov 2024	Philippines Tuguegarao	Urdaneta Philippines
Ubay Philippines District	8 Dec 2024	Philippines Cebu East	Cebu City Philippines
Urdaneta Philippines Stake	22 Sep 1985	Philippines Urdaneta	Urdaneta Philippines
Valenzuela Philippines Stake	8 Feb 1998	Philippines Quezon City North	Manila Philippines
Vigan Philippines Stake	13 Jan 2002	Philippines Laoag	Urdaneta Philippines
Zamboanga Philippines Stake	10 Nov 1985	Philippines Ozamiz	Davao Philippines

== Missions ==
Mission	Organized
Philippines Angeles	12 Feb 1992
Philippines Antipolo	28 June 2019
Philippines Bacolod	1 July 1974
Philippines Baguio	1 July 1979
Philippines Butuan	1 July 2006
Philippines Cabanatuan	28 June 2018
Philippines Cagayan de Oro	19 Oct 1987
Philippines Cauayan	1 Sep 1990
Philippines Cavite	1 July 2013
Philippines Cebu	1 July 1987
Philippines Cebu East	1 July 2013
Philippines Davao	1 July 1977
Philippines Dumaguete	1 July 2024
Philippines General Santos	1 July 2024
Philippines Iloilo	30 June 2010
Philippines Laoag	1 Nov 2004
Philippines Legazpi	1 July 2013
Philippines Lingayen	1 July 2026
Philippines Lipa	1 July 2026
Philippines Manila	28 June 1967
Philippines Naga	1 July 1989
Philippines Olongapo	1 July 1988
Philippines Ormoc	1 July 2026
Philippines Ozamiz	1 July 2026
Philippines Puerto Princesa	1 July 2026
Philippines Quezon City	1 July 1986
Philippines Quezon City North	30 June 2011
Philippines San Pablo	26 June 1990
Philippines Tacloban	1 July 1990
Philippines Tuguegarao	1 July 2024
Philippines Urdaneta	1 July 2013

== Philippines Missionary Training Center ==
The Philippines has its own Missionary Training Center (MTC), where native Filipinos receive missionary training in their own language. The first MTC was dedicated on October 8, 1983, and was housed in a private rented residence. The second MTC was opened July 13, 1992, and stands across the road from the Manila temple. In 2011, the MTC underwent extensive remodeling and was rededicated in May 2012 by Russell M. Nelson. Other nations, including those listed below, send missionaries to the Philippines MTC to receive training in their native language.

- India
- Pakistan
- Mongolia
- Cambodia
- Thailand
- Indonesia
- Taiwan
- Hong Kong
- Singapore
- Vietnam
- Malaysia
- Bangladesh
- Sri Lanka

As of May 2026, the MTC president is Manuel M. Agustin.

== Temples ==

Temples in the Philippines

Temples in the Luzon Region

Temples in the Visayas Region

Temples in Metro Manila

= Operating
= Under construction
= Announced
= Temporarily Closed

=== Operating ===
29. Manila Philippines Temple; Official website; News & images	
Location: Announced: Groundbreaking: Dedicated: Size: Style:	Quezon City, Philippines; 1 April 1981 by Spencer W. Kimball; 25 August 1982 by Gordon B. Hinckley; 25 September 1984 by Gordon B. Hinckley; 26,683 sq ft (2,478.9 m^{2}) on a 3.5-acre (1.4 ha) site Modern adaptation of six-spire design - designed by Church A&E Services with Felipe M. Mendoza & Partners
133. Cebu City Philippines Temple; Official website; News & images	
Location: Announced: Groundbreaking: Dedicated: Size: Notes:	Cebu City, Philippines; 18 April 2006 by Gordon B. Hinckley; 14 November 2007 by Dallin H. Oaks; 13 June 2010 by Thomas S. Monson; 29,556 sq ft (2,745.8 m^{2}) on a 11.6-acre (4.7 ha) site - designed by Architectural Nexus and Recio & Casa Architects; Announced by letter to local priesthood leaders in April 2006.
190. Urdaneta Philippines Temple; Official website; News & images	
Location: Announced: Groundbreaking: Dedicated: Size:	Urdaneta, Philippines; 2 October 2010 by Thomas S. Monson; 16 January 2019 by Jeffrey R. Holland; 28 April 2024 by Dallin H. Oaks; 32,604 sq ft (3,029.0 m^{2}) on a 15.34-acre (6.21 ha) site
213. Alabang Philippines Temple; Official website; News & images	
Location: Announced: Groundbreaking: Dedicated: Size:	Muntinlupa, Philippines; 2 April 2017 by Thomas S. Monson; 4 June 2020 by Evan A. Schmutz; 18 January 2026 by David A. Bednar; 35,998 sq ft (3,344.3 m^{2}) on a 2.62-acre (1.06 ha) site
215. Davao Philippines Temple; Official website; News & images	
Location: Announced: Groundbreaking: Dedicated: Size:	Davao, Philippines; 7 October 2018 by Russell M. Nelson; 14 November 2020 by Taniela B. Wakolo; 3 May 2026 by Dale G. Renlund; 18,450 sq ft (1,714 m^{2}) on a 2.7-acre (1.1 ha) site
217. Bacolod Philippines Temple; Official website; News & images	
Location: Announced: Groundbreaking: Dedicated: Size:	Bacolod, Philippines; 5 October 2019 by Russell M. Nelson; 11 December 2021 by Taniela B. Wakolo; 31 May 2026 by Neil L. Andersen; 27,895 sq ft (2,591.5 m^{2}) on a 12.3-acre (5.0 ha) site

=== Under Construction ===
251. Cagayan de Oro Philippines Temple (Under construction); Official website; News & images	
Location: Announced: Groundbreaking: Size:	Cagayan de Oro, Misamis Oriental, Philippines; 1 April 2018 by Russell M. Nelson; 31 August 2024 by Carlos G. Revillo Jr. 18,449 sq ft (1,714.0 m^{2}) on a 4.9-acre (2.0 ha) site
254. Tacloban City Philippines Temple (Under construction); Official website; News & images	
Location: Announced: Groundbreaking: Size:	Tacloban City, Philippines; 3 October 2021 by Russell M. Nelson; 18 January 2025 by Michael B. Strong; 21,407 sq ft (1,988.8 m^{2}) on a 6.99-acre (2.83 ha) site
282. Naga Philippines Temple (Under construction); Official website; News & images	
Location: Announced: Groundbreaking: Size:	Naga, Camarines Sur, Philippines; 2 October 2022 by Russell M. Nelson; 8 August 2026 by Steven D. Shumway; 18,850 sq ft (1,751 m^{2}) on a 9.11-acre (3.69 ha) site

=== Announced ===
313. Santiago Philippines Temple (Site announced); Official website; News & images	
Location: Announced: Size:	Santiago City, Philippines; 2 October 2022 by Russell M. Nelson; 18,850 sq ft (1,751 m^{2}) on a 14.47-acre (5.86 ha) site
321. Tuguegarao City Philippines Temple (Site announced); Official website; News & images	
Location: Announced: Size:	Tuguegarao City, Philippines; 2 April 2023 by Russell M. Nelson; 18,850 sq ft (1,751 m^{2}) on a 6.3-acre (2.5 ha) site
322. Iloilo Philippines Temple (Site announced); Official website; News & images	
Location: Announced: Size:	Iloilo, Philippines; 2 April 2023 by Russell M. Nelson; 18,850 sq ft (1,751 m^{2}) on a 7.7-acre (3.1 ha) site
336. Laoag Philippines Temple (Announced); Official website; News & images	
Location: Announced:	Laoag, Philippines; 1 October 2023 by Russell M. Nelson
374. San Jose del Monte Philippines Temple (Announced); Official website; News & images	
Location: Announced:	San Jose del Monte, Philippines; 6 April 2025 by Russell M. Nelson

== See also ==
- The Church of Jesus Christ of Latter-day Saints membership statistics
- Religion in the Philippines

== Additional reading ==
- "The Philippines: Spiritual Strength upon the Isles of the Sea", Liahona, April 2014
