= Alabang Philippines Temple =

LDS temple in Muntinlupa, Philippines

- Interactive map of Alabang Philippines Temple
- Number: 213
- Dedication: 18 January 2026, by David A. Bednar
- Site: 2.62 acres (1.06 ha)
- Floor area: 35,998 ft^{2} (3,344.3 m^{2})
- Official website • News & images

Church chronology
← Burley Idaho Temple	Alabang Philippines Temple	→ Harare Zimbabwe Temple

Additional information
- Announced: 2 April 2017, by Thomas S. Monson
- Groundbreaking: 4 June 2020, by Evan A. Schmutz
- Open house: 21 November-13 December 2025
- Current president: Romeo Elisan
- Location: Muntinlupa, Philippines
- Coordinates: 14°24′46″N 121°02′18″E

The Alabang Philippines Temple is a temple of the Church of Jesus Christ of Latter-day Saints in Alabang, Muntinlupa, Metro Manila, Philippines. The intent to build the temple was announced on April 2, 2017, by church president Thomas S. Monson during general conference. It is the church's fourth operating temple in the Philippines.

It is a two-story building on a 2.6-acre site, with a granite exterior, and a single attached spire. A groundbreaking ceremony, to signify the beginning of construction, was held on June 4, 2020, with Evan A. Schmutz, a general authority and president of the church's Philippines Area, presiding. The temple was dedicated on January 18, 2026, by David A. Bednar, of the Quorum of the Twelve Apostles.

== History ==
The intent to construct a temple in the greater Manila, Philippines, area was announced by church president Thomas S. Monson on April 2, 2017, during general conference. The location was later identified as Alabang, Muntinlupa, Metro Manila. It is the fourth temple in the Philippines and the second in the Metro Manila area,

A groundbreaking ceremony, signifying the beginning of construction, was held on June 4, 2020, presided over by Evan A. Schmutz, president of the Philippines Area. Due to the COVID-19 pandemic, the ceremony was limited, with only a few church members invited to attend.

When construction was completed, a public open house was held from November 21 through December 13, 2025, excluding Sundays. The temple was dedicated on January 18, 2026, by David A. Bednar, of the Quorum of the Twelve Apostles.

== Design and architecture ==
The temple is a two-story building on a 2.6-acre (1.1 ha) site in Filinvest City. The site has flower beds, palm trees, and is surrounded by tall skyscrapers. The design is rectangular, with an exterior composed of light-colored granite stone. A square-based tower is located above the main entrance, which has a single attached spire. The interior has woodwork, decorative painting, and granite. Both design and construction of the temple was managed by the design-build firm Haskell.

== Local impact ==
The project has made a community impact through its construction program's commitment to worker safety and local charitable efforts. According to the Haskell website, the project has received multiple honors from the Safety Organization of the Philippines (SOPI) and the Department of Labor and Employment (DOLE) for its strict safety protocols, including the Perfect Safety Record award. The construction teams' safety-first focus also led to a significant community contribution of over 900 units of blood donated to the Red Cross

The temple was built in a master-planned urban center. The site includes a dedicated three-story patron housing facility to accommodate members traveling long distances.

== Temple leadership ==
The church's temples are directed by a temple president and matron, each typically serving for a term of three years. The president and matron oversee the administration of temple operations and provide guidance and training for both temple patrons and staff. Romeo S. Elisan Jr. is serving as the first president, with Jocelyn S. Elisan as matron.

== Admittance ==
On August 4, 2025, the church announced the public open house that was held from November 21 to December 13, 2025, excluding Sundays. A media day took place November 17, 2025, and invited guests toured the temple from November 18 to 20. The temple was dedicated by David A. Bednar on January 18, 2026.

Like all the church's temples, it is not used for Sunday worship services. To members of the church, temples are regarded as sacred houses of the Lord. Once dedicated, only church members with a current temple recommend can enter for worship.

== See also ==
- The Church of Jesus Christ of Latter-day Saints in the Philippines
- Comparison of temples of The Church of Jesus Christ of Latter-day Saints
- List of temples of The Church of Jesus Christ of Latter-day Saints
- List of temples of The Church of Jesus Christ of Latter-day Saints by geographic region
- Religion in the Philippines
- Temple architecture (Latter-day Saints)

Temples in the Philippines, Luzon Region
= Operating
= Under construction
= Announced
= Temporarily closed
