= Taniela B. Wakolo =

Fijian Latter-day Saint leader

General Authority
- 1 April 2017
- Called by: Thomas S. Monson

Personal details
- Born: Taniela Biu Wakolo; 25 June 1967 (age 58); Lomaloma, Lau, Fiji

Taniela Biu Wakolo (born 25 June 1967) has been a general authority of the Church of Jesus Christ of Latter-day Saints (LDS Church) since April 2017. He is the first Fijian to serve as a general authority.

Wakolo was born in Lomaloma, Lau, Fiji. Wakolo studied management and public administration at the University of the South Pacific. He has a master's degree in management from the University of the Sunshine Coast. Wakolo originally worked as a police officer in Fiji. He later worked for the LDS Church, managing the office in Fiji which oversees the church's business affairs and temporal welfare programs in that country.

== LDS Church service ==
Wakolo was baptized on 17 March 1994, and two weeks after his baptism was called to be in his ward Young Men presidency and to teach seminary with his wife. Among other positions in the LDS Church, Wakolo has served as an institute teacher, branch president, member of a stake high council, counselor in a bishopric, counselor in a stake presidency, president of the Nausori Fiji Stake, area seventy and president of the church's Arkansas Little Rock Mission from 2014 to 2017.

In 2011, Wakolo went to Vanuatu for training meetings with district presidencies and LDS Church public affairs councils and was quoted saying, "We believe that as we teach of Jesus Christ, family lives, individual lives, communities, and Vanuatu as a nation will become better." In March 2018, Wakolo gave his first address in an LDS Church general conference and spoke on ordinances: "What ordinances, including the sacrament, do I need to receive, and what covenants do I need to make, keep and honor? I promise that participating in ordinances and honoring the associated covenants will bring you marvelous light and protection in this ever-darkening world." In 2019 Wakolo presided over the lighting of the church's temple in White Plains, Quezon City, Philippines. Other prominent attendees there included Rev. Fr. Richard Babao from the Ministry for Ecumenism and Interfaith Affairs, Archdiocese of Manila. After previously serving as a counselor in the area, Wakolo has been president of the church's Philippines Area since August 2020. In November 2020 he presided over the groundbreaking for the Davao Philippines Temple and in July 2021 he presided over the groundbreaking for a 24-acre site where a facility to house conferences for church youth was being built in Tanay, Philippines.

== Personal life ==
Wakolo and his wife, Anita Herberta Moimoi, were married in 1987. He joined the LDS Church in 1994 after they had been married about seven years. They are the parents of two children.
