= Cebu City Philippines Temple =

LDS Church temple in Cebu City

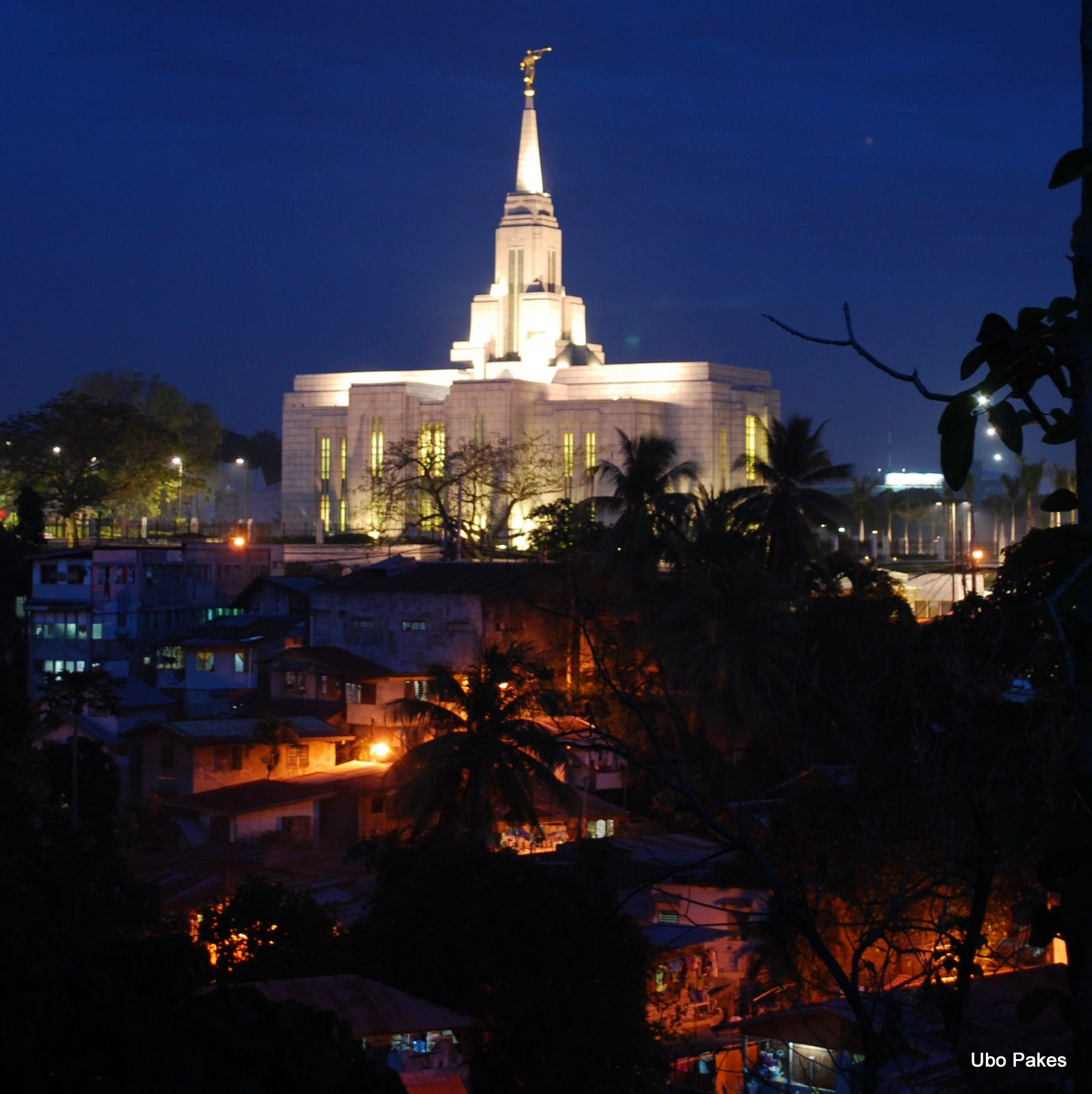
- The Cebu City Philippines Temple
- Interactive map of Cebu City Philippines Temple
- Number: 133
- Dedication: 13 June 2010, by Thomas S. Monson
- Site: 11.6 acres (4.7 ha)
- Floor area: 29,556 ft^{2} (2,745.8 m^{2})
- Height: 140 ft (43 m)
- Official website • News & images

Church chronology
← Gila Valley Arizona Temple	Cebu City Philippines Temple	→ Kyiv Ukraine Temple

Additional information
- Announced: 18 April 2006, by Gordon B. Hinckley
- Groundbreaking: 14 November 2007, by Dallin H. Oaks
- Open house: 21 May – 5 June 2010
- Current president: Normando Ong
- Designed by: Architectural Nexus and Recio & Casa Architects
- Location: Cebu City, Philippines
- Coordinates: 10°19′39″N 123°53′54″E
- Exterior finish: Mountain grey granite from China
- Baptistries: 1
- Ordinance rooms: 2 (two-stage progressive)
- Sealing rooms: 2
- Clothing rental: yes
- Notes: Announced by letter to local priesthood leaders in April 2006.

The Cebu City Philippines Temple is the 133rd operating temple of the Church of Jesus Christ of Latter-day Saints (LDS Church) and the second constructed in the Philippines, following the one in Manila. The temple is located on Gorordo Avenue in Lahug, Cebu City, and serves church members in the Visayas and Mindanao regions.

== History ==
The LDS Church's history in the Philippines traces back to World War II, beginning with the American landing at Leyte on October 20, 1944, and the subsequent fall of Manila in February 1945. During this time, servicemen who were church members organized its first meetings in Tacloban at a U.S. naval installation. Many Latter-day Saint servicemen remained in the Philippines after the war due to the continued U.S. military presence. In August 1955, Joseph Fielding Smith, president of the church's Quorum of the Twelve Apostles, dedicated Korea and the Philippines for missionary work at Clark Air Base. This added the country into the church's Southern Far East Mission. The church's first temple, located in Manila, was later dedicated in 1984.

Plans to build the temple were announced on April 18, 2006, in a letter from the First Presidency. A groundbreaking ceremony, marking the beginning of construction, was held on November 14, 2007, with Dallin H. Oaks presiding. The event took place on the 4-hectare complex along Gorordo Avenue in Lahug, Cebu City, and was attended by local officials, including Mayor Tomas Osmeña, Barangay Captain Mary Ann Delos Santos, and Provincial Board Member Vicente Maambong, together with selected church members.

After construction was completed, a public open house was held from May 21 to June 5, 2010, except Sundays. The temple was then dedicated on June 13, 2010, by church president Thomas S. Monson in three sessions. The sessions were broadcast to 164 church meetinghouses across the country. Other church general authorities in attendance included Henry B. Eyring, Oaks, William R. Walker, H. David Burton, Keith R. Edwards, Won Yong Ko, and Michael J. Teh.

On November 5, 2009, an angel Moroni statue was placed on top of the temple spire. In October 2013, the Bohol earthquake shook the building and caused the statue to rotate from its east-facing position to face south. It was returned to its original orientation in January 2014.

== Architecture and design ==
Close-up view of temple at night

The temple is built on an 11.6-acre (4.7 ha) site shared with a church meetinghouse, patron house, residences for the temple and mission presidents, and a mission office. The temple has a total floor area of 29,556 square feet. (2,746 m^{2}) The steeple is 140 feet (43 m) above ground, with the angel Moroni statue on its top. The exterior is mountain grey granite from China.

The interior's materials include Fairfax granite from China, Verde Yellow stone from Italy, and Condor White marble from Greece. African sapele mahogany is used extensively for doors and woodwork, while many furnishings were manufactured locally from Philippine mahogany. A decorate pearl motif reflects both the Philippine pearl trade and symbolic references in scripture, while the color palette of turquoise, aqua, green, gold, and rose was selected to reflect the natural environment of the Philippine archipelago. Murals in the ordinance rooms include works by Linda Curley Christensen and Adler Llagas, while chandeliers include Swarovski crystals from Austria.

The interior has two ordinance rooms, two sealing rooms, and a baptistry. In the baptistry, the font rests on the backs of twelve oxen, representing the twelve tribes of Israel. The baptistry also has a painting of the baptism of Jesus Christ in the Jordan River.

During World War II, the site was used as a Japanese stronghold. Excavation for the temple uncovered 20-foot-deep tunnels containing old equipment and unexploded bombs, which were removed before the tunnels were filled with concrete.

== Open house and dedication ==
After construction was complete, a public open house was held from May 21 to June 5, 2010, with 45,103 people touring the temple, including 7,215 on the final day. On June 12, 2010, a cultural celebration titled A Celebration of Filipino Heritage was held at the Cebu Coliseum. About 4,000 young people took part in the celebration, with 2,000 performing live at the Cebu Coliseum and another 2,000 appearing on large screens from distant areas of the temple district.

At the time of its dedication, the temple served approximately 200,000 Latter-day Saints in the Visayas and Mindanao regions. Having the new temple significantly reduced travel time for some church members, including those who had previously journeyed of up to 30 hours by boat to reach the Manila Philippines Temple, while others in the Cebu temple district were still as far as 12 hours away.

== Temple leadership and admittance ==
The church's temples are directed by a temple president and matron, each typically serving for a term of three years. The president and matron oversee the administration of temple operations and provide guidance and training for both temple patrons and staff. Serving from 2010 to 2012, Gerald E. Mortimer was the first president, with Linda G. Mortimer serving as matron. As of 2025, Normando L. Ong is the president, with Leticia S. Ong serving as matron.

Like all the church's temples, it is not used for Sunday worship services. To members of the church, temples are regarded as sacred houses of the Lord. Once dedicated, only church members with a current temple recommend can enter for worship.

== See also ==

Temples in the Philippines, Visayas Region
= Operating
= Under construction
= Announced
= Temporarily Closed

- The Church of Jesus Christ of Latter-day Saints in the Philippines
- Comparison of temples of The Church of Jesus Christ of Latter-day Saints
- List of temples of The Church of Jesus Christ of Latter-day Saints
- List of temples of The Church of Jesus Christ of Latter-day Saints by geographic region
- Temple architecture (LDS Church)
