= Manila Philippines Temple =

Temple of the Latter Day Saints

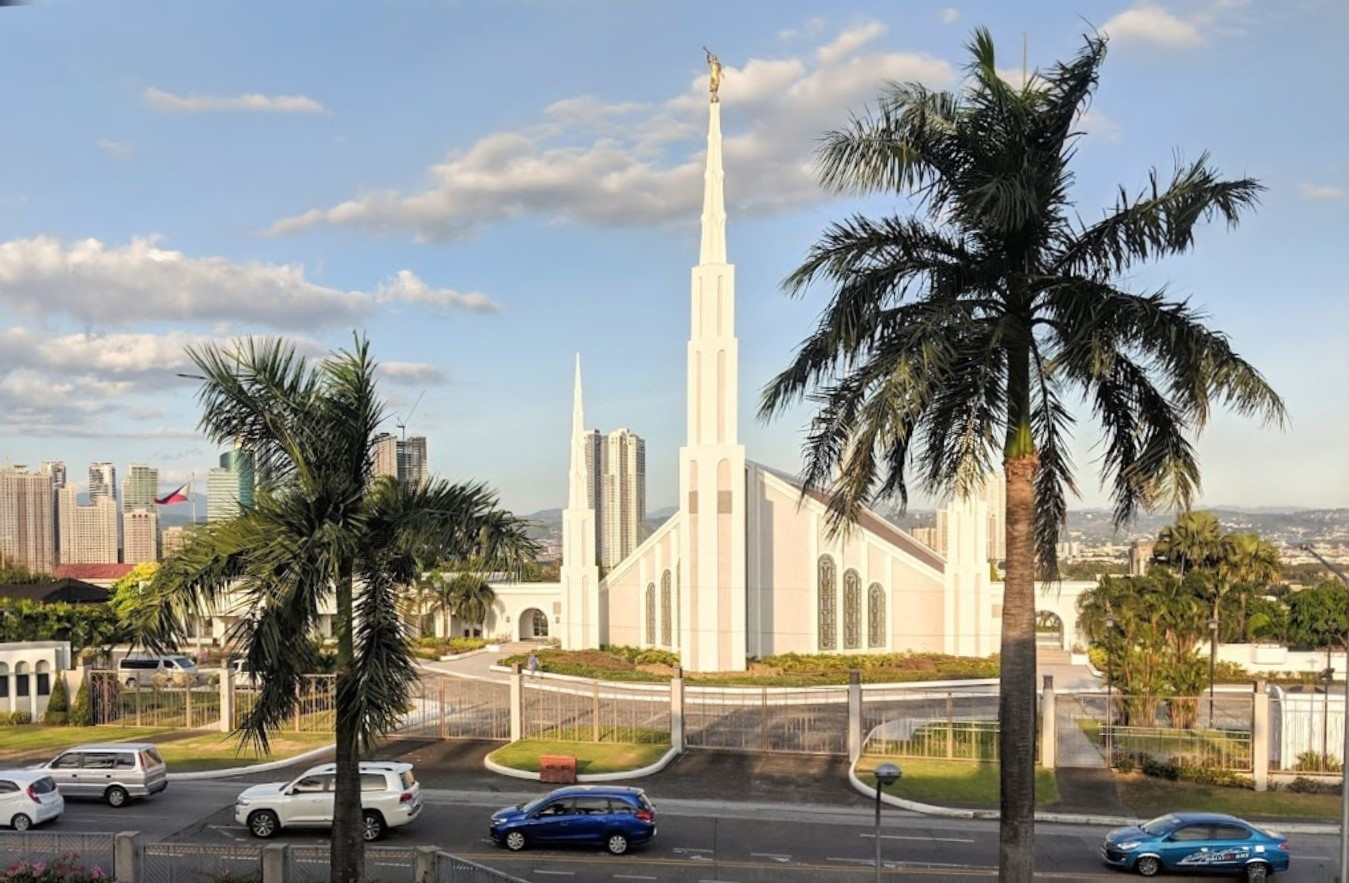
- Interactive map of Manila Philippines Temple
- Number: 29
- Dedication: 25 September 1984, by Gordon B. Hinckley
- Site: 3.5 acres (1.4 ha)
- Floor area: 26,683 ft^{2} (2,478.9 m^{2})
- Height: 115 ft (35 m)
- Official website • News & images

Church chronology
← Sydney Australia Temple	Manila Philippines Temple	→ Dallas Texas Temple

Additional information
- Announced: 1 April 1981, by Spencer W. Kimball
- Groundbreaking: 25 August 1982, by Gordon B. Hinckley
- Open house: 3–15 September 1984
- Current president: Edgardo Enriquez Fernando
- Designed by: Church A&E Services with Felipe M. Mendoza & Partners
- Location: Quezon City, Philippines
- Coordinates: 14°36′4.881599″N 121°4′11.34479″E
- Exterior finish: Ceramic tile
- Design: Modern adaptation of six-spire design
- Baptistries: 1
- Ordinance rooms: 4 (stationary)
- Sealing rooms: 3
- Clothing rental: Yes

The Manila Philippines Temple is a temple of the Church of Jesus Christ of Latter-day Saints located in Quezon City, Metro Manila. It is the church's 29th operating temple and its first in Philippines. Announced by church president Spencer W. Kimball on April 1, 1981, it became a landmark for the rapidly growing church membership in the country. A groundbreaking ceremony was held on August 25, 1982, presided over by Gordon B. Hinckley. The temple was dedicated in nine sessions from September 25 to 27, 1984.

The temple is on a 3.5‑acre site in Quezon City and has a modern six‑spire design with an angel Moroni statue on the top. The total floor area is 26,683 square feet. It has four ordinance rooms, three sealing rooms, and a baptistry.

== History ==
View of temple windows in 2009

A temple in Manila, Philippines was announced by church president Spencer W. Kimball on April 1, 1981. Earlier that year, the church purchased approximately 3.5 acres (14,000 m^{2}) of land in Quezon City, Metro Manila, at what became 13 Temple Drive.

Initial plans were for a two‑story structure with 26,683 square feet (2,478.9 m^{2}) of floor space of 200 feet (61 m) by 75 feet (23 m), finished in white ceramic tile, with a modern six‑spire design, with an angel Moroni statue, that brought the height to approximately 115 feet (35 m) high.

A groundbreaking ceremony took place on August 25, 1982, presided over by Gordon B. Hinckley, then counselor in the church's First Presidency. Around 2,000 local church members were in attendance. After construction was completed, a public open house was held from September 3 to 15, 1984, where approximately 26,520 visitors toured the temple.

Just prior to the dedication, the Philippines experienced multiple natural events—including two typhoons, the eruption of Mayon volcano, and an earthquake in northern Luzon—but none impacted the temple or its complex.

The temple was dedicated by Hinckley, with nine sessions held from September 25 to 27, 1984.

In December 1989, during a coup attempt against Philippine president Corazon Aquino, rebel forces in Manila occupied areas near Camp Aguinaldo, across the street from the temple. On December 2, armed men breached the temple gates and used the grounds for cover during exchanges of gunfire with government troops. Temple security director Dignardino Espi and his team sheltered inside the temple with custodial staff, fasting and praying for the building’s protection, while local church leaders coordinated with authorities to urge caution during the fighting.

Helicopters, tanks, and fighter jets struck nearby streets, damaging auxiliary church facilities and perimeter walls, but the temple itself was never entered and remained unharmed. According to accounts later shared by Dallin H. Oaks, church leaders in Salt Lake City prayed specifically for the temple’s safety during the hour a major assault had been planned; the attack was canceled, and by the following morning, rebel soldiers had abandoned the grounds. Participants and leaders described the temple’s preservation as a miracle of divine protection, though only minor exterior damage occurred to other buildings. Reportedly, six mortar or rocket shells exploded on the grounds, with a few even passing between the spires.

In 2020, like all the church's others, the Manila Philippines Temple was closed for a time in response to the COVID-19 pandemic.

== Design and architecture ==
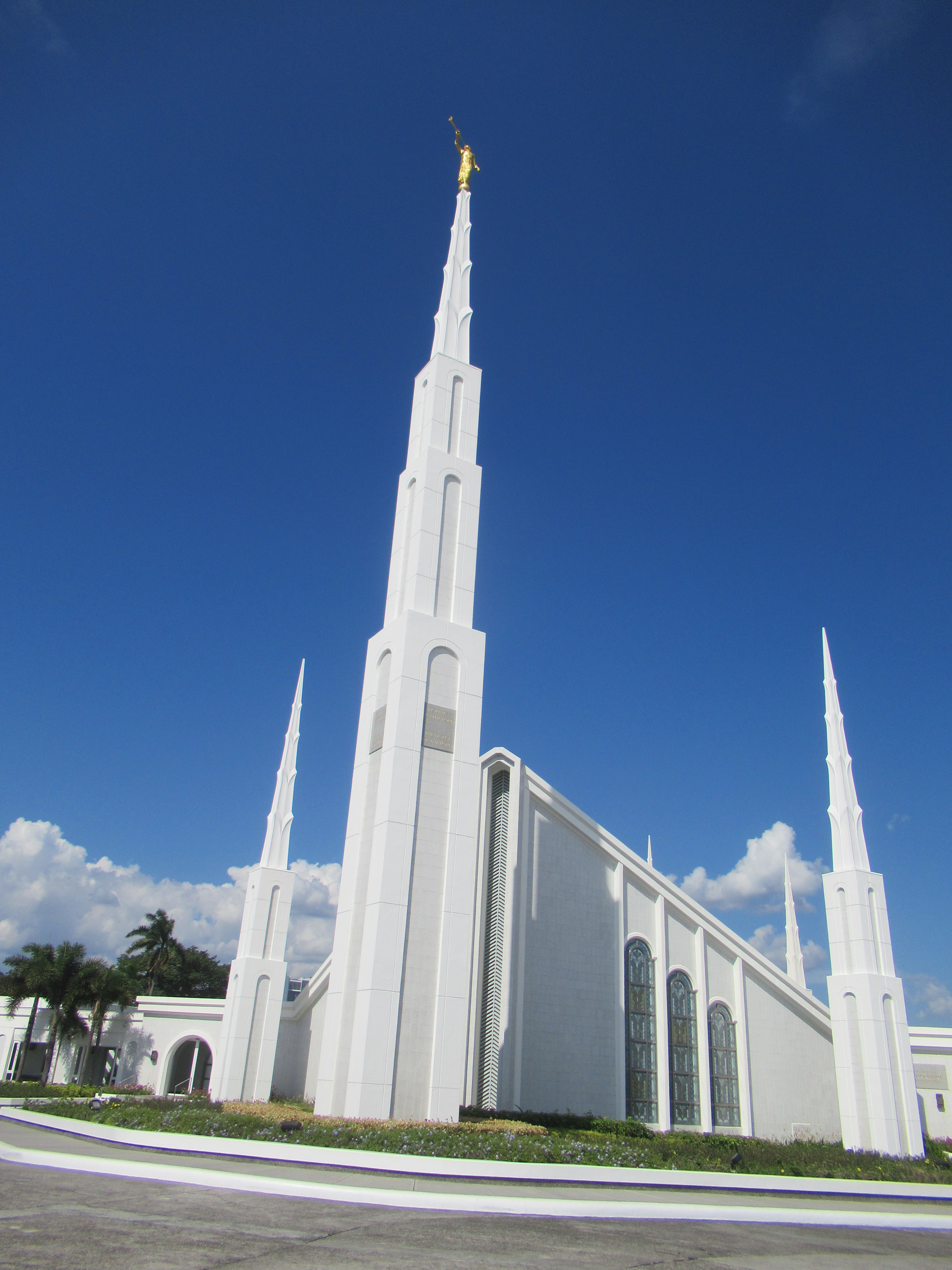
The temple in 2023

The temple exterior uses ceramic tile, has a six‑spire design, with the tallest spire being 115 feet (35 m) and having an angel Moroni statue on its top. The site is approximately 3.5 acres (14,000 m^{2}) at 13 Temple Drive, Greenmeadows Subdivision, Quezon City, and has landscaped grounds. It is across the street from the Philippines Missionary Training Center and near offices of the church’s Philippines Area. The interior has four ordinance rooms, three sealing rooms, and a baptistry. The floor area is 26,683 square feet (2,478.9 m^{2}).

== Temple presidents and admittance ==
=== Temple presidents ===
The church's temples are directed by a temple president and matron, each typically serving for a term of three years. The president and matron oversee the administration of temple operations and provide guidance and training for both temple patrons and staff.

Serving from 1984 to 1987, Willard G. Andrus was the first president. Beginning in September 2025, Edgardo E. Fernando will be the president, with Rosemarie B. Fernando serving as matron.

=== Admittance ===
After construction was completed, a public open house was held from September 3–15, 1984, with approximately 26,520 visitors touring the temple ahead of dedication. The temple was dedicated in nine sessions from September 25 to 27, 1984, by Gordon B. Hinckley.

Like all the church's temples, it is not used for Sunday worship services. To members of the church, temples are regarded as sacred houses of the Lord. Once dedicated, only church members with a current temple recommend can enter for worship.

== See also ==

Temples in the Philippines, Luzon Region
= Operating
= Under construction
= Announced
= Temporarily Closed

- The Church of Jesus Christ of Latter-day Saints in the Philippines
- Comparison of temples of The Church of Jesus Christ of Latter-day Saints
- List of temples of The Church of Jesus Christ of Latter-day Saints
- List of temples of The Church of Jesus Christ of Latter-day Saints by geographic region
- Temple architecture (LDS Church)
