= Meridian Idaho Temple =

Latter-day Saint temple in Idaho, United States

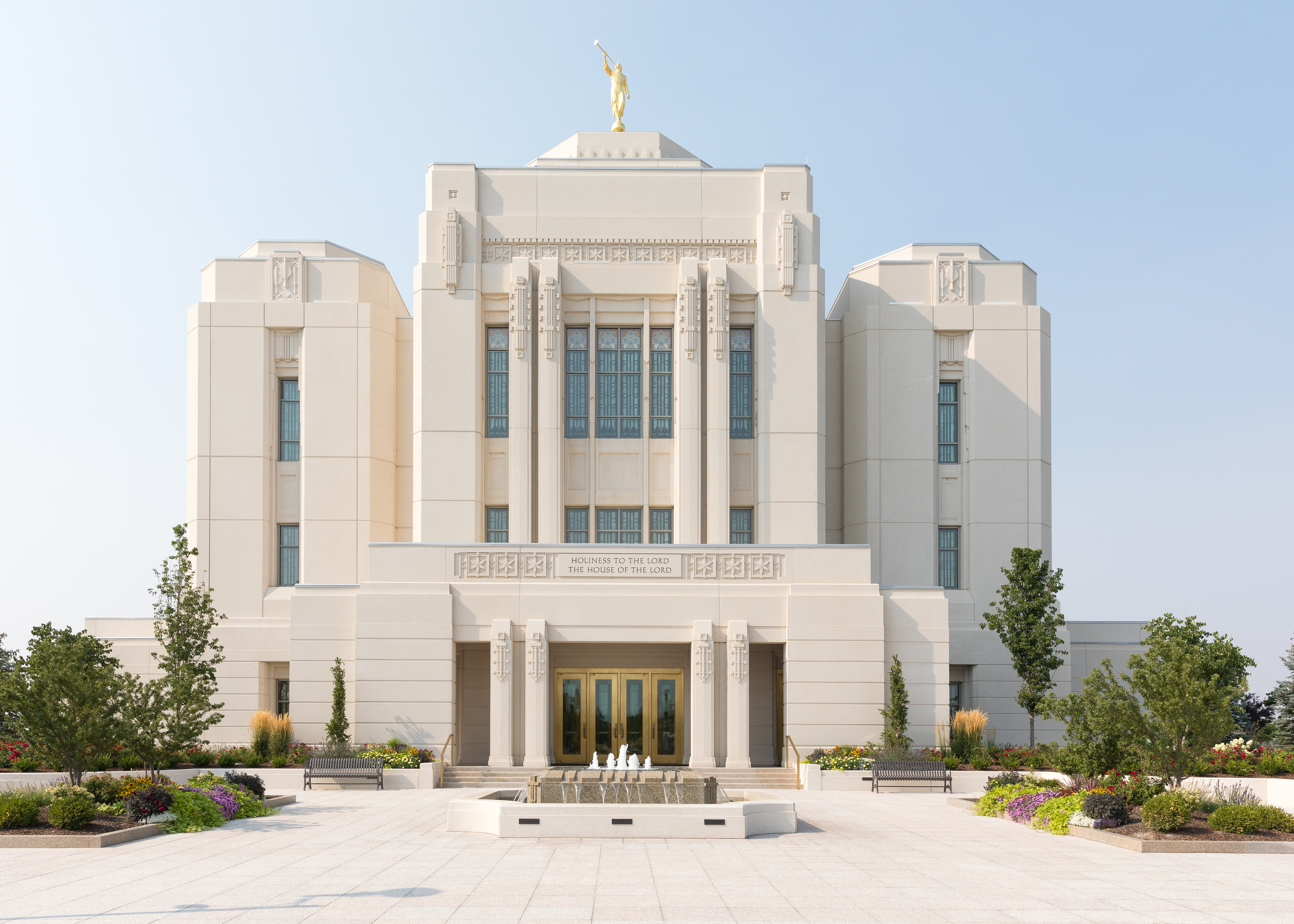
- Interactive map of Meridian Idaho Temple
- Number: 158
- Dedication: November 19, 2017, by Dieter F. Uchtdorf
- Site: 15.73 acres (6.37 ha)
- Floor area: 67,331 ft^{2} (6,255.3 m^{2})
- Height: 120.2 ft (36.6 m)
- Official website • News & images

Church chronology
| ← Tucson Arizona Temple | Meridian Idaho Temple | → Cedar City Utah Temple |

Additional information
- Announced: April 2, 2011, by Thomas S. Monson
- Groundbreaking: August 23, 2014, by David A. Bednar
- Open house: October 21 – November 11, 2017
- Current president: Dell Elliott Jemmett
- Location: Meridian, Idaho, U.S.
- Coordinates: 43°40′18.45″N 116°24′51.71″W
- Exterior finish: Precast concrete
- Baptistries: 1
- Ordinance rooms: 3 (two-stage progressive)
- Sealing rooms: 5

The Meridian Idaho Temple is a temple of the Church of Jesus Christ of Latter-day Saints in Meridian, Idaho. The intent to build the temple was announced by church president Thomas S. Monson on April 4, 2011, during general conference. It was the church's first in Idaho announced by Monson, but is the state’s fifth temple.

The temple has an octagonal dome topped with a statue of the angel Moroni. This temple was designed by Richardson Design Partnership, using Prairie School or Prairie Style architecture. A groundbreaking ceremony, to signify the beginning of construction, was held on August 23, 2014, conducted by David A. Bednar.

== History ==
On December 19, 2011, it was announced that the Meridian Idaho Temple would be constructed at 7345 North Linder Road, north of the intersection of North Linder Road and Chinden Blvd.

David A. Bednar, of the Quorum of the Twelve Apostles, presided at the temple's groundbreaking on August 23, 2014. After construction was completed, a public open house was held from October 21 through November 11, 2017. The temple was dedicated on November 19, 2017 by Dieter F. Uchtdorf, of the First Presidency.

The temple's design has seismic standards above the code requirements, including its exterior cladding. The cladding is connected to the steel frame so that it discharges energy through a rocking motion and acts like a buffer in the event of an earthquake. The temple interior includes marble quarried from Egypt, Italy, and Spain. According to the church, the temple's design includes the syringa (Idaho' state flower) and golds, blues and greens in the wool rugs and stained glass, reflecting Idaho harvest and nature.

In 2020, like all the church's others, the Meridian Idaho Temple was closed for a time in response to the COVID-19 pandemic.

== Design and architecture ==
The building has a Prairie School architectural style, coupled with a traditional Latter-day Saint temple design. Designed by Richardson Design Partnership, its architecture reflects both the cultural heritage of the Boise region and its spiritual significance to the church. Its design was inspired by the nearby Sawtooth Mountains.

The temple is on a 15.73-acre plot, and the landscaping around the temple features ponds, trees, shrubbery, and walking paths. These elements are designed to provide a tranquil setting that enhances the sacred atmosphere of the site.

The structure stands 120 feet tall, constructed with precast concrete. The exterior resembles the Cardston Alberta and Laie Hawaii temples, which share the Prairie School architectural style. The temple features an “octagonal cupola cap, with the titanium surfacing changing colors from blue-gray to gold to bronze, depending on the sun.” The design uses geometric elements inspired by the Boise meridian, which the city of Meridian is named for.

The interior features a floral motif throughout the art glass and other decorations, including carved carpets in the celestial room. The interior design’s color palette includes white, gold, turquoise, and bronze. There are over 100 paintings throughout the temple, “including 10 original pieces of art. Two original murals reflect the Idaho mountains and wilderness.”

The temple includes three instruction rooms and five sealing rooms, each designed for ceremonial use.

The design has symbolic elements representing the heritage and natural landscapes of the Boise region, which provide deeper spiritual meaning to the temple's appearance and function. Symbolism is important to church members and include use of Idaho’s state flower, the syringa, in the temple’s floral motifs. Symbolism is also found in the temple’s color palette: white represents the syringa, gold is a reference to Treasure Valley grasses, turquoise symbolizes the sky, and bronze represents the nearby woods.

== Temple presidents ==
The church's temples are directed by a temple president and matron, each serving for a term of three years. The president and matron oversee the administration of temple operations and provide guidance and training for both temple patrons and staff.

Serving from 2017 to 2020, the first president of the Meridian Idaho Temple was James R. McCauley, with Arlene F. McCauley as matron. As of 2024, Bruce E. Hobbs is the president, with Julia D. Hobbs serving as matron.

== Admittance ==
Following the completion of construction, the church announced the public open house that was held from October 21-November 11, 2017 (excluding Sundays). The temple was dedicated by Dieter F. Uchtdorf on November 19, 2017, in three sessions.

Like all the church's temples, it is not used for Sunday worship services. To members of the church, temples are regarded as sacred houses of the Lord. Once dedicated, only church members with a current temple recommend can enter for worship.

== See also ==
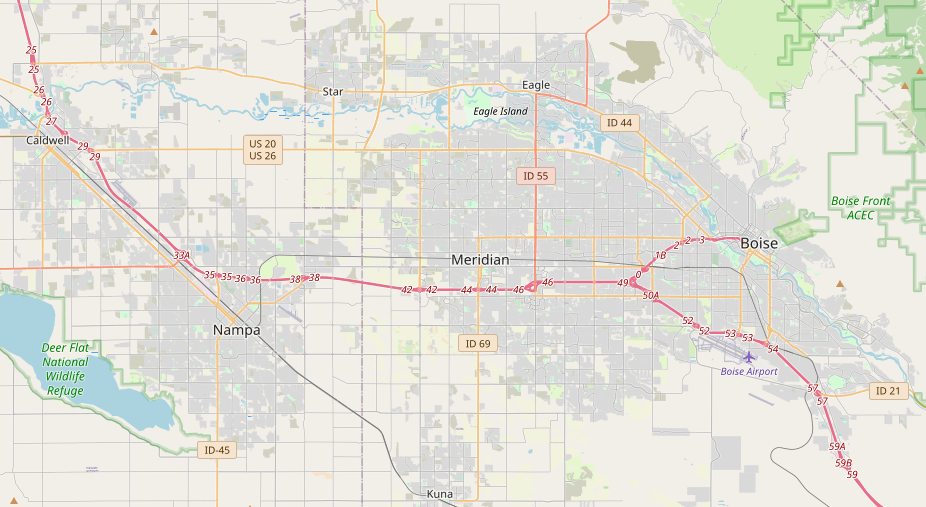

Temples in Boise Metro

Eastern Idaho Temples
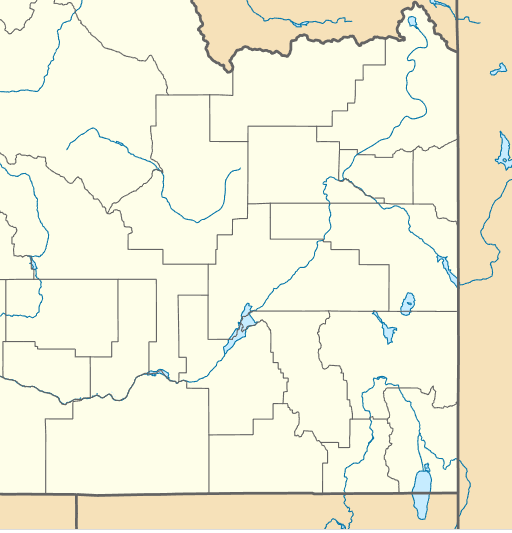
Temples in Eastern Idaho
Idaho Map

Temples in Idaho
- = Operating
- = Under construction
- = Announced
- = Temporarily Closed

- Comparison of temples of The Church of Jesus Christ of Latter-day Saints
- List of temples of The Church of Jesus Christ of Latter-day Saints
- List of temples of The Church of Jesus Christ of Latter-day Saints by geographic region
- Temple architecture (Latter-day Saints)
- The Church of Jesus Christ of Latter-day Saints in Idaho
