= Twin Falls Idaho Temple =

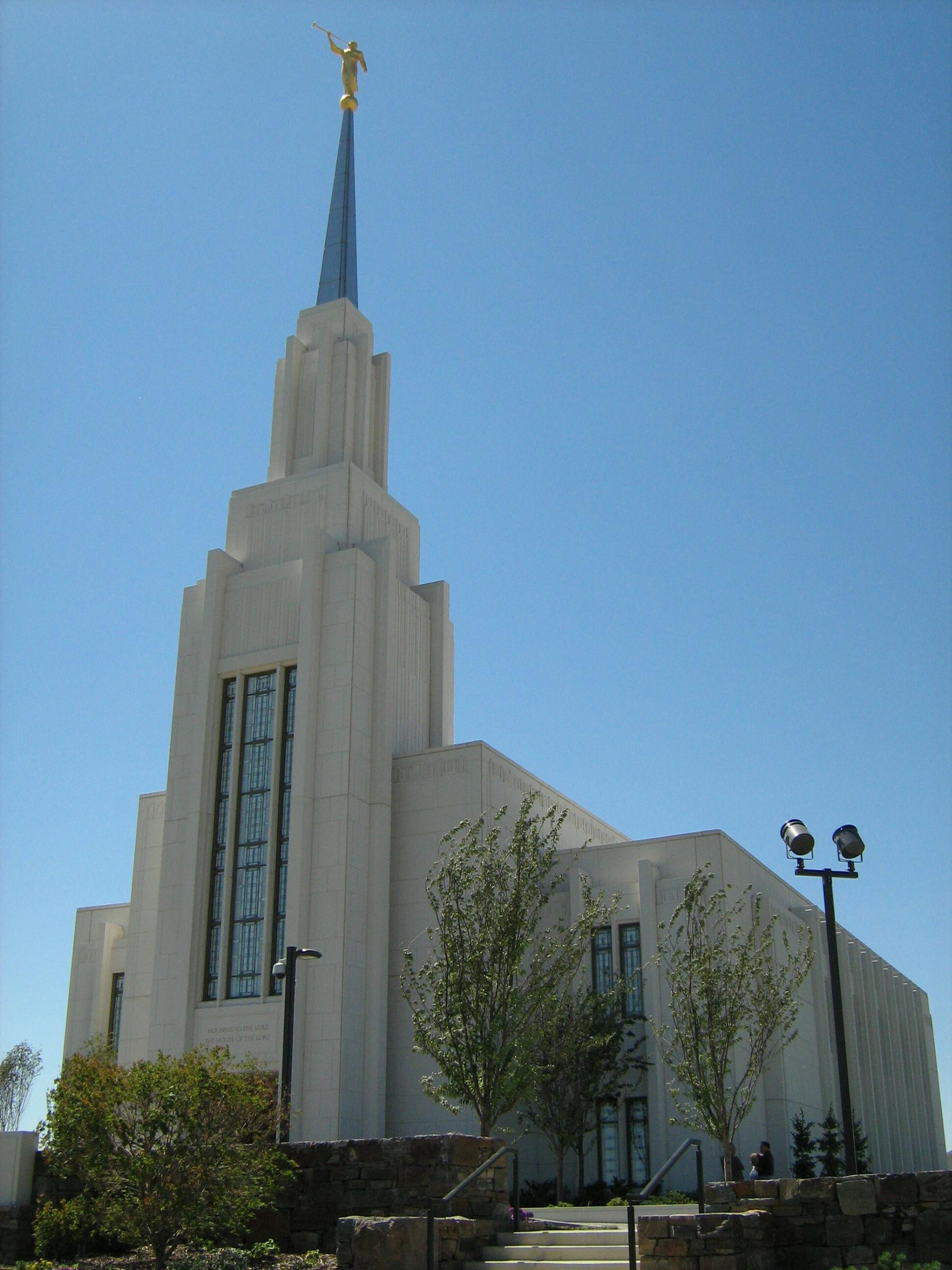
- Twin Falls Temple during public Open House event, August 15, 2007.
- Interactive map of Twin Falls Idaho Temple
- Number: 128
- Dedication: August 24, 2008, by Thomas S. Monson
- Site: 9.1 acres (3.7 ha)
- Floor area: 31,245 ft^{2} (2,902.8 m^{2})
- Height: 159 ft (48 m)
- Official website • News & images

Church chronology
← Panama City Panama Temple	Twin Falls Idaho Temple	→ Draper Utah Temple

Additional information
- Announced: October 2, 2004, by Gordon B. Hinckley
- Groundbreaking: April 15, 2006, by Neil L. Andersen
- Open house: July 11 – August 15, 2008
- Current president: Kent J. Allen
- Designed by: MHTN Architects, Inc
- Location: Twin Falls, Idaho, U.S.
- Coordinates: 42°35′12.05520″N 114°26′29.66640″W
- Exterior finish: Precast concrete panels with quartz rock finish
- Baptistries: 1
- Ordinance rooms: 2 (two-stage progressive)
- Sealing rooms: 3
- Notes: Fourth temple dedicated in Idaho and, during 2008, the second temple dedicated in Idaho that year.

The Twin Falls Idaho Temple is a temple of the Church of Jesus Christ of Latter-day Saints located in Twin Falls, Idaho, just south of the Snake River Canyon. The intent to build the temple was announced on October 2, 2004, by church president Gordon B. Hinckley, during general conference. It became the fourth Latter-day Saint temple in the state when it was dedicated in August 2008 and the second dedicated in Idaho that year. As of 2009, at an approximate height of 159 feet (48 m), it was the tallest building in Twin Falls.

The temple has a single attached end spire with a statue of the angel Moroni. This temple was designed by MHTN Architects, Inc., using a classic modern architectural style. A groundbreaking ceremony, to signify the beginning of construction, was held on April 15, 2006, conducted by Neil L. Andersen.

== History ==
Church president Gordon B. Hinckley announced the construction of a temple in Idaho's Magic Valley region on October 2, 2004, during general conference. It was built to serve the thousands of members who live in southern Idaho between the Boise and Idaho Falls temples.

Rumors of the temple started several weeks before general conference when the church's negotiations to purchase the Candleridge Golf Course came to light. The financially unprofitable course had already announced its intention to close on December 31, 2004, yet over 300 residents near the golf course produced a petition protesting the loss of the golf course to the temple, upset that their investments into homes next to a golf course would become investments into homes bordering a busy church. In response, the church distributed printed materials, stating its intentions to work with neighbors with regard to traffic and parking when the time came to present plans to the city.

=== Plans ===
The Twin Falls Planning and Zoning Commission approved the necessary permits for the building of the temple on November 8, 2005. The commission approved a special-use permit for a temple and meetinghouse and also approved a variance for the temple to exceed the city's 35-foot (11 m) maximum height limit. The commission's approval allowed the church to move to the next stages of planning and to address parking concerns expressed by commission members, who worried that the 300-space parking lot may be insufficient.

Plans for the temple, inspired by nearby Shoshone Falls, were unveiled on October 6, 2005, at a press conference held in the former Candleridge Golf Course clubhouse. The model displayed the upcoming white two-story temple, which was capped with a gold-leafed angel Moroni atop a spire rising 159 feet (48 m) in the air on May 30, 2007—making it the highest point in the area. Also sharing the 9.1-acre (37,000 m^{2}) complex is a new stake center, over 300 parking spaces, and tree-lined boulevards and gardens. The church, which went to great lengths to minimize the worries of neighbors, contracted with developer Ken Edmunds to subdivide the balance of the 36-acre (150,000 m^{2}) plot to complement the existing neighborhood.

=== Groundbreaking ===
Ground was broken for the temple on April 15, 2006. Presiding at the ceremony was Neil L. Andersen of the Presidency of the Seventy. Stake presidents and their families comprised most of the audience at the invitation-only event. At the time of its construction, the temple served approximately 50,000 church members in the area.

=== Open house and dedication ===
The Twin Falls Temple held a public open house from July 11 through August 15, 2008, excluding Sundays. The church reported that visitors during the open house totaled nearly 160,000, approximately 60 percent of whom were church members. The temple was dedicated on August 24, 2008 in 4 sessions. A cultural celebration took place at the Twin Falls County Fairgrounds the night before. Ordinance work began the Monday following the dedication. Retired Burley dairy farmer and former member of the Second Quorum of the Seventy, D. Rex Gerratt, served as the first president.

A cornerstone session and four dedicatory sessions took place on August 24, 2008. Church president Thomas S. Monson presided at the dedication and was assisted by other church general authorities, including Henry B. Eyring, Quentin L. Cook and Claudio R. M. Costa. Due to overwhelming interest and limited seating in the temple, the final session was broadcast to various church buildings throughout Idaho.

== Design and architecture ==
The building has a classic modern architectural style, and uses traditional Latter-day Saint temple design. Designed by MHTN Architects, Inc., the design used aspects of the Twin Falls area and the nearby Shoshone Falls, which “became a key element of inspiration, with its great sense of ruggedness, pureness, and strength.” The temple is on a 9-acre plot (6), which was once part of the golf course. The landscaping around the temple features gardens and tree-lined boulevards.

The structure stands two stories tall, and is constructed with concrete panels with a quartz rock finish. The exterior has 200 art-glass windowpanes, “many with depiction of the syringa flower.

The interior has an original mural by a local artist, and fiberglass oxen which support the baptismal font. The temple includes four ordinance rooms, five sealing rooms, and a baptistry, each designed for ceremonial use.

The design has symbolic elements representing the heritage and natural landscapes of Idaho, to provide deeper spiritual meaning to the temple's appearance and function. Symbolism is important to church members and include the syringa flower motif used throughout the temple’s interior and exterior; the syringa is Idaho’s state flower.

== Temple presidents ==
The church's temples are directed by a temple president and matron, each serving for a term of three years. The president and matron oversee the administration of temple operations and provide guidance and training for both temple patrons and staff.

Serving from 2008 to 2010, the first president of the Twin Falls Idaho Temple was D. Rex Gerratt, with the matron being Marjorie C. Gerratt. As of 2024, Reed J. Harris is the president, with Kathleen C. Harris serving as matron.

== Admittance ==
On March 17, 2008, the church announced the public open house that was held from July 11 to August 16, 2008 (excluding Sundays). The temple was dedicated by Thomas S. Monson on August 24, 2008, in four sessions.

Like all the church's temples, it is not used for Sunday worship services. To members of the church, temples are regarded as sacred houses of the Lord. Once dedicated, only church members with a current temple recommend can enter for worship.

== See also ==
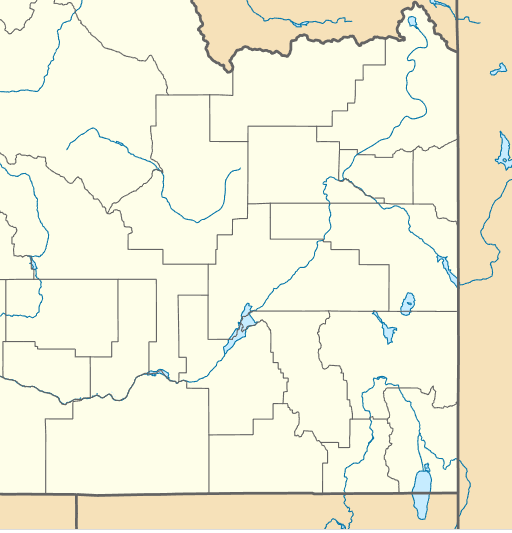

Temples in Eastern Idaho

Boise Metro Temples
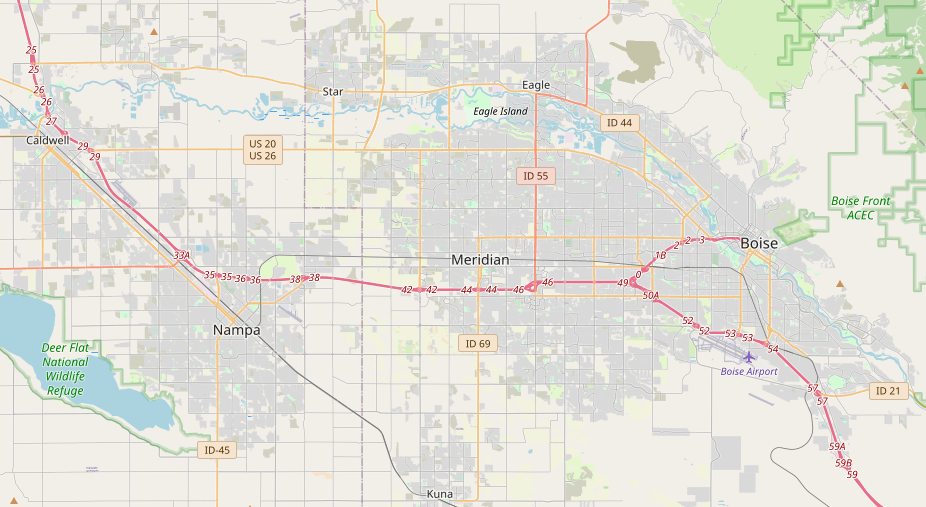
Temples in Boise Metro
Idaho Map

Temples in Idaho
- = Operating
- = Under construction
- = Announced
- = Temporarily Closed

- Comparison of temples of The Church of Jesus Christ of Latter-day Saints
- List of temples of The Church of Jesus Christ of Latter-day Saints
- List of temples of The Church of Jesus Christ of Latter-day Saints by geographic region
- Temple architecture (Latter-day Saints)
- The Church of Jesus Christ of Latter-day Saints in Idaho
