= Rexburg Idaho Temple =

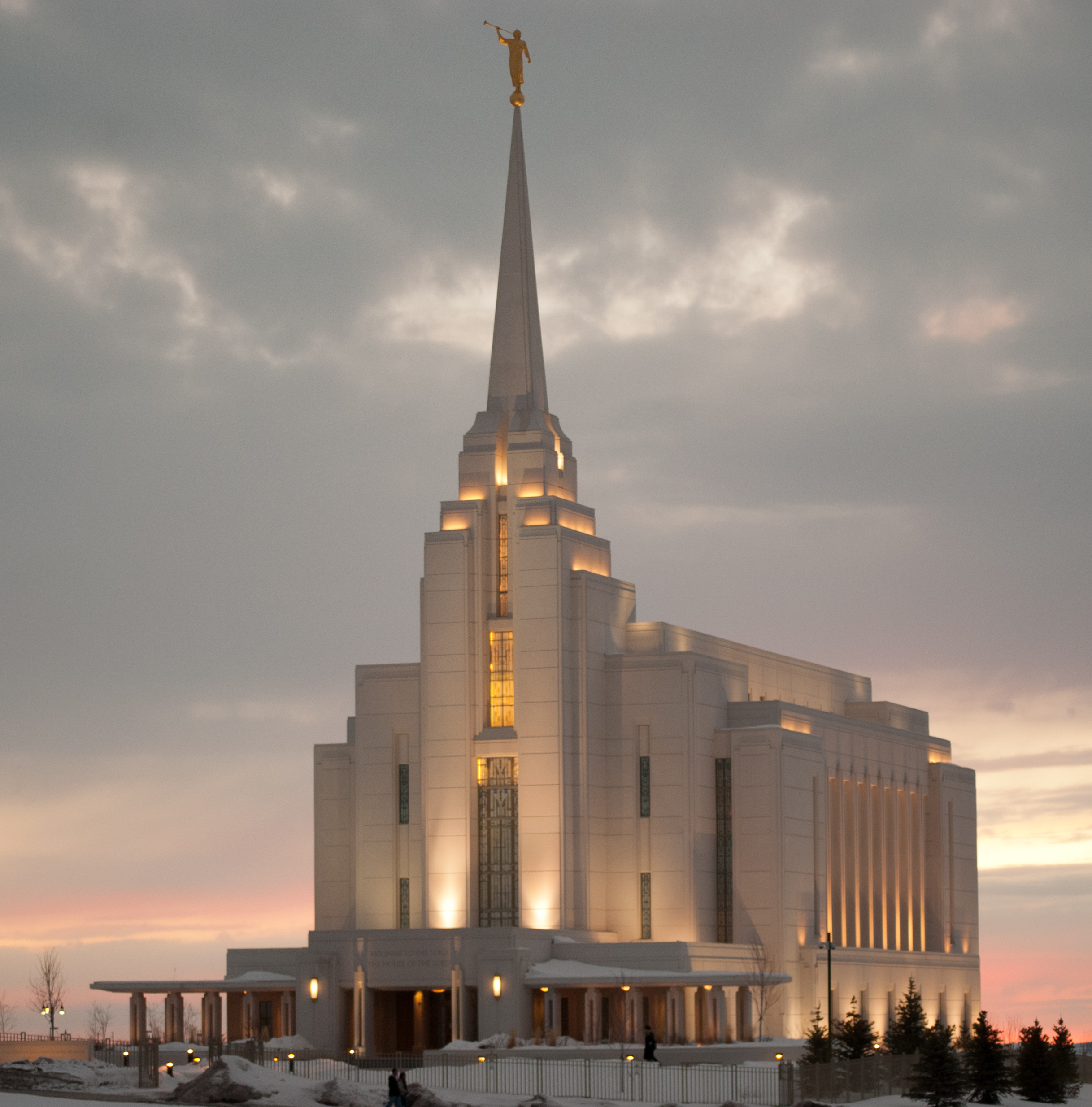
- Interactive map of Rexburg Idaho Temple
- Number: 125
- Dedication: February 10, 2008, by Thomas S. Monson
- Site: 10 acres (4.0 ha)
- Floor area: 57,504 ft^{2} (5,342.3 m^{2})
- Height: 169 ft (52 m)
- Official website • News & images

Church chronology
← Helsinki Finland Temple	Rexburg Idaho Temple	→ Curitiba Brazil Temple

Additional information
- Announced: December 20, 2003, by Gordon B. Hinckley
- Groundbreaking: July 30, 2005, by John H. Groberg
- Open house: December 29, 2007 – January 26, 2008
- Current president: Robert E. Chambers
- Designed by: Architectural Nexus; Bob Petroff
- Location: Rexburg, Idaho, U.S.
- Coordinates: 43°48′38.55240″N 111°46′44.71680″W
- Exterior finish: Concrete panels with white quartz rock
- Design: Classic modern, single-spire
- Baptistries: 1
- Ordinance rooms: 4 (two-stage progressive)
- Sealing rooms: 5
- Clothing rental: Yes
- Notes: First temple dedicated by Thomas S. Monson as President of the Church

The Rexburg Idaho Temple is the 125th operating temple of the Church of Jesus Christ of Latter-day Saints. The intent to build the temple was announced by the First Presidency on December 12, 2003, in a letter to local church leaders. The temple was the third in Idaho, and the first in the state in the 21st century.

The temple has a single attached end spire with a statue of the angel Moroni. This temple was designed by Bob Petroff and Architectural Nexus, using a classic modern style. A groundbreaking ceremony, to signify the beginning of construction, was held on July 30, 2005, conducted by John H. Groberg.

== History ==
The temple was announced by the First Presidency on December 12, 2003, in a letter to local priesthood leaders. The groundbreaking ceremony, signifying beginning of construction, was held on July 30, 2005, with John H. Groberg presiding, and local church members and community leaders attending.

The temple was dedicated on February 10, 2008 and was the first temple dedicated by Thomas S. Monson as the church's new president. The Rexburg Idaho Temple was the third in Idaho, with a fourth dedicated in Twin Falls later in the year. The temple sits south of the Brigham Young University–Idaho (BYU–Idaho) campus on the south side of Rexburg. Prior to its completion, BYU–Idaho was the only university owned by the church that did not have a temple adjacent to its campus.

The designing of this temple differs from others since it was designed by a private firm, not the church's architectural department. This was done because the church wished it to have a fresh new look. The temple has two progressive endowment and five sealing rooms.

On August 30, 2007, it was announced that the temple's open house would begin on December 29, 2007, and run through January 26, 2008. The dedication was scheduled for February 3, 2008; however, due to the death of church president Gordon B. Hinckley and his funeral planned for February 2, 2008, the dedication was postponed one week and was dedicated on February 10 by Monson. Val R. Christensen was the temple's first president.

Like much of the city, the temple sits atop a hill, with a shield volcano nearby; making the temple a prominent landmark visible from many parts of the area.

In 2020, like all the church's others, the Rexburg Idaho Temple was closed in response to the COVID-19 pandemic.

== Design and architecture ==
The building has a classic modern architectural style, coupled with a traditional Latter-day Saint temple design. Its architecture shows the cultural heritage of the Rexburg region and its spiritual significance to the church. It is on a 10-acre plot adjacent to BYU-Idaho. There is a garden area west of the temple that is open to the public.

The structure stands five stories tall, constructed with precast concrete with a quartz rock finish. The exterior includes 700 art-glass window panes, an element chosen for its symbolic significance and alignment with temple traditions.

The interior features murals by native Rexburg artist, Leon Parson, which depict “the natural beauty of eastern Idaho.” The temple includes a celestial room, a baptistry, four ordinance rooms, and five sealing rooms, each arranged for ceremonial use.

The design uses symbolic elements to provide deeper spiritual meaning to the temple's appearance and function. Symbolism is important to church members and includes a wheat stalk motif throughout the art-glass windows, which represents the Rexburg area’s agricultural industry.

Nearby facilities were used for a cultural celebration on February 9, 2008, to commemorate the temple’s dedication. Approximately 2,000 young church members performed in the event, which told the story of the Mormon pioneers who settled the Upper Snake River Valley in 1883.

== Temple presidents ==
The church's temples are directed by a temple president and matron, each serving for a term of three years. The president and matron oversee the administration of temple operations and provide guidance and training for both temple patrons and staff.

The first president of the Rexburg Idaho Temple was Val R. Christensen, with Ruth A. Christensen as matron. They served from 2008 to 2010. In 2024, Ryan M. Kunz was the president, with Ranae H. Kunz serving as matron. In 2025, Robert Edward Chambers is the president, with Robin Sue Christensen Chambers serving as matron.

== Admittance ==
On December 22, 2007, the church announced that a public open house would be held from December 29, 2007-January 26, 2008 (excluding Sundays). During the open house, over 200,000 people visited the temple. The temple was initially scheduled to be dedicated on February 3, 2008, but the dedication was delayed due to the death of Gordon B. Hinckley on January 27, 2008. The temple was dedicated in three sessions by newly-named church president Thomas S. Monson on February 11, 2008.

Like all the church's temples, it is not used for Sunday worship services. To members of the church, temples are regarded as sacred houses of the Lord. Once dedicated, only church members with a current temple recommend can enter for worship.

== See also ==
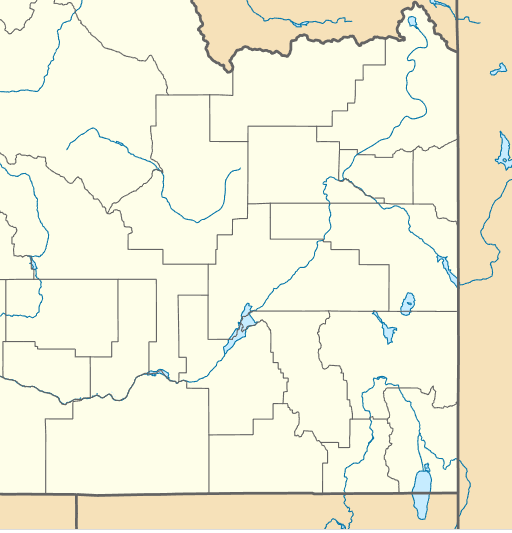

Temples in Eastern Idaho

Boise Metro Temples
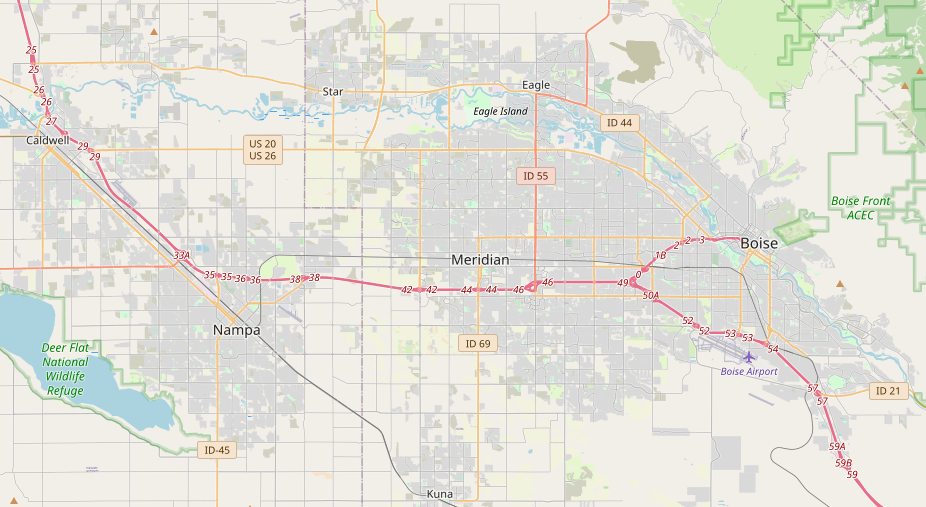
Temples in Boise Metro
Idaho Map

Temples in Idaho
- = Operating
- = Under construction
- = Announced
- = Temporarily Closed

- Comparison of temples (LDS Church)
- List of temples (LDS Church)
- List of temples by geographic region (LDS Church)
- The Church of Jesus Christ of Latter-day Saints in Idaho
