= Burley Idaho Temple =

- Burley Idaho Temple from the front
- Interactive map of Burley Idaho Temple
- Number: 212
- Dedication: 11 January 2026, by Dallin H. Oaks
- Site: 10.12 acres (4.10 ha)
- Floor area: 45,300 ft^{2} (4,210 m^{2})
- Official website • News & images

Church chronology
← Bahía Blanca Argentina Temple	Burley Idaho Temple	→ Alabang Philippines Temple

Additional information
- Announced: April 4, 2021, by Russell M. Nelson
- Groundbreaking: 4 June 2022, by Brent H. Nielson
- Open house: 6-22 November 2025
- Current president: Paul Kenji Tateoka
- Location: Burley, Idaho, United States
- Coordinates: 42°31′36″N 113°45′53″W
- Baptistries: 1
- Ordinance rooms: 4
- Sealing rooms: 3

The Burley Idaho Temple is a temple of the Church of Jesus Christ of Latter-day Saints in Burley, Idaho. Announced in April 2021 by church president Russell M. Nelson, the temple is on a 10.1-acre site at 40 South and 150 East, about half a mile southwest of the Snake River.

The two-story building is 45,300 square feet, with a central spire, and is the church’s seventh temple in Idaho. A groundbreaking ceremony was held on June 4, 2022, with Brent H. Nielson, a member of the Presidency of the Seventy and a Burley native, presiding. Following a media day on November 3 and invited guest tours on November 4–5, 2025, a public open house took place from November 6–22, 2025. The temple was dedicated by church president Dallin H. Oaks on January 11, 2026. This was the first temple Oaks dedicated since becoming church president.

== History ==
=== Announcement ===
On April 4, 2021, church president Russell M. Nelson announced plans for the Burley Idaho Temple during general conference. It was one of 20 announced that day. Nelson emphasized that “temples are a vital part of the Restoration of the gospel of Jesus Christ in its fullness.”

At the time of the announcement, Idaho had more than 460,000 church members in about 1,200 congregations. The temple in Burley became the state's seventh Others for the state announced will be in Caldwell, Coeur d’Alene, Montpelier, and Rexburg’s Teton River.

=== Groundbreaking ===
The temple’s site, a former potato farm donated by the Funk family, was identified in June 2021 as a 10.1-acre parcel of farmland near Highway 81. Brent H. Nielson, a church general authority, presided at the groundbreaking on June 4, 2022, offering a dedicatory prayer that the temple would bring “an eternal harvest” to the Magic Valley.

=== Construction ===
By 2023, contractors had completed exterior cladding with 45,000 square feet of Bianco Sardo granite, including ornate friezes featuring the potato flower, a local agricultural symbol. Landscaping included trees, shrubs, and Oakley Stone around the plaza. Church members in the community expressed excitement by providing food to construction workers and sharing updates on social media. By late 2025, construction was in its final stages, with finishing work such as woodworking, painting, and gold leaf underway.

== Design and architecture ==
The Burley Idaho Temple is a two-story, 38,600-square-foot building, located at an elevation of 4,188 feet. It includes four instruction rooms, three sealing rooms, and a baptistry

The temple has a single attached spire, and its exterior has Bianco Sardo granite with stepped cornices and decorative windows. A frieze uses a potato flower motif, tied to the region’s agricultural heritage. Interior materials include wood, marble, and granite imported from Italy Stained-glass windows show potato plants, with roots, foliage, and blossoms. The temple’s rendering, released in September 2021, was similar to the Twin Falls Idaho Temple.

== Temple practices and access ==
The church's temples are directed by a temple president and matron, each typically serving for a term of three years. The president and matron oversee the administration of temple operations and provide guidance and training for both temple patrons and staff. The first president and matron will be Paul K. Tateoka and Nadine L. Tateoka.

A media day will be held November 3, 2025, followed by invited guest tours on November 4–5. The public open house will be conducted from November 6 to 22, excluding Sundays. The temple was dedicated on January 11, 2026 by church president Dallin H. Oaks.

Like all the church's temples, it is not used for Sunday worship services. To members of the church, temples are regarded as sacred houses of the Lord. Once dedicated, only church members with a current temple recommend can enter for worship.

The temple will serve members in southern Idaho, particularly the Mini Cassia area’s approximately 20,000 members.

== See also ==
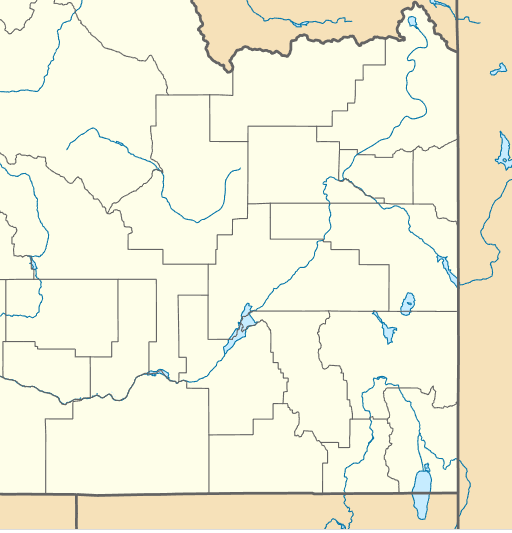
Temples in Eastern Idaho
- = Operating
- = Under construction
- = Announced
- = Temporarily Closed
- Comparison of temples (LDS Church)
- List of temples (LDS Church)
- List of temples by geographic region (LDS Church)
- Temple architecture (LDS Church)
- The Church of Jesus Christ of Latter-day Saints in Idaho
