= The Church of Jesus Christ of Latter-day Saints in Idaho =

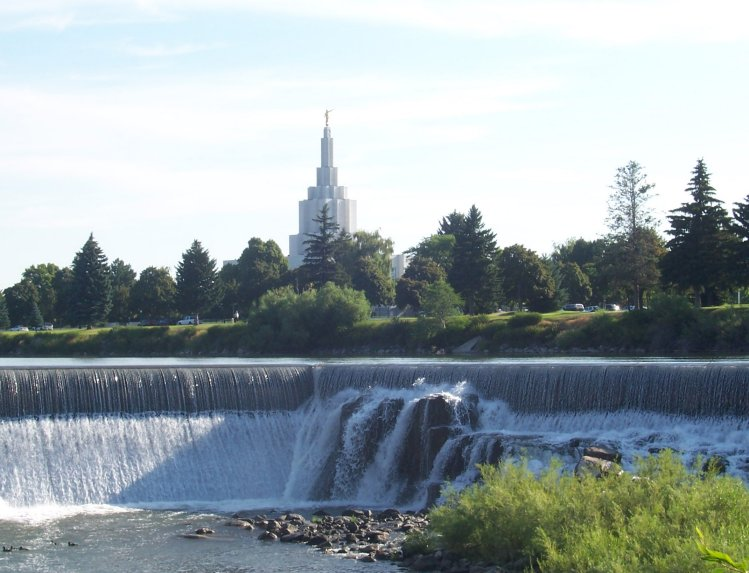
- The Idaho Falls Idaho Temple as seen from an overlook
- Area: US Central; US West (North)
- Members: 482,905 (2025)
- Stakes: 147
- Wards: 1,275
- Branches: 48
- Total Congregations: 1,323
- Missions: 3
- Temples: 6 operating 3 under construction 2 announced 11 total
- FamilySearch Centers: 70

The Church of Jesus Christ of Latter-day Saints (LDS Church) is the largest religious body in the state of Idaho, commanding the allegiance of 24% of the population. After California and Utah, Idaho contains the most Mormons of any US state. By percentage, it ranks second, behind Utah. The church is particularly prominent in the east of the state. The city of Rexburg is home to Brigham Young University–Idaho.

== History ==
Membership in Idaho
Year	Membership
1900	29,421
1920	77,900
1930	87,100
1940	105,200
1950	137,250
1960	168,900
1970	183,400
1980	272,670
1990	296,782
1999	343,489
2009	406,764
2019	462,069
2025	482,905
*Membership was published as a rounded number.

The LDS Church first came to Idaho in 1855, when Brigham Young sent pioneers to settle the area. Early settlements were in Franklin, Bear Lake Valley, and south-central Idaho. Idaho became a state in 1890, at which time Latter-day Saints comprised one-fifth of the population. Church presidents Harold B. Lee, Ezra Taft Benson, and Howard W. Hunter were all natives of the state.

== County statistics ==
List of LDS Church adherents in each county as of 2010 according to the Association of Religion Data Archives: Note: Each county adherent count reflects meetinghouse location of congregation and not location of residence. Census count reflects location of residence, which may skew percent of population where adherents reside in a different county than their congregational meetinghouse.

County	Congregations	Adherents	% of population
Ada	132	61,860	15.8
Adams	1	183	4.6
Bannock	116	43,023	51.9
Bear Lake	17	5,060	84.5
Benewah	2	580	6.2
Bingham	73	27,042	59.3
Blaine	5	2,275	10.6
Boise	3	872	12.4
Bonner	6	2,818	6.9
Bonneville	138	59,311	56.9
Boundary	2	747	6.8
Butte	6	1,634	56.5
Camas	1	145	13.0
Canyon	63	29,758	15.8
Caribou	15	5,327	76.5
Cassia	32	11,922	51.9
Clark	1	287	29.2
Clearwater	2	563	6.4
Custer	5	1,189	27.2
Elmore	9	3,189	11.8
Franklin	35	11,434	89.4
Fremont	20	8,586	64.8
Gem	8	3,100	18.5
Gooding	8	3,370	21.8
Idaho	2	630	3.8
Jefferson	44	18,908	72.3
Jerome	12	4,818	21.5
Kootenai	14	8,164	5.9
Latah	12	3,214	8.6
Lemhi	4	1,607	20.2
Lewis	2	734	19.2
Lincoln	4	1,395	26.8
Madison	157	37,831	71.5
Minidoka	20	7,714	38.4
Nez Perce	4	1,961	5.0
Oneida	10	3,547	82.8
Owyhee	5	2,013	17.5
Payette	5	3,531	15.6
Power	8	3,052	39.0
Shoshone	2	683	5.4
Teton	10	3,440	33.8
Twin Falls	43	19,000	24.6
Valley	3	1,017	10.3
Washington	4	1,731	17.0

== Stakes ==
As of September 2026, Idaho had the following stakes:

Stake	Organized	Mission	Temple
American Falls Idaho	1 Feb 1948	Idaho Pocatello	Pocatello Idaho
Ammon Idaho Centennial Ranch	17 May 2026	Idaho Idaho Falls	Idaho Falls Idaho
Ammon Idaho East	19 Feb 2017	Idaho Idaho Falls	Idaho Falls Idaho
Ammon Idaho Foothills	27 Apr 2003	Idaho Idaho Falls	Idaho Falls Idaho
Ammon Idaho North	16 Nov 2008	Idaho Idaho Falls	Idaho Falls Idaho
Ammon Idaho	26 Nov 1961	Idaho Idaho Falls	Idaho Falls Idaho
Arimo Idaho	17 Jun 1984	Idaho Pocatello	Pocatello Idaho
Ashton Idaho	18 May 1975	Idaho Idaho Falls	Rexburg Idaho
Blackfoot Idaho East	12 Dec 1982	Idaho Idaho Falls	Pocatello Idaho
Blackfoot Idaho Northwest	30 Apr 1978	Idaho Idaho Falls	Pocatello Idaho
Blackfoot Idaho South	20 Jun 1954	Idaho Idaho Falls	Pocatello Idaho
Blackfoot Idaho	31 Jan 1904	Idaho Idaho Falls	Pocatello Idaho
Blackfoot Idaho West	1 Mar 1970	Idaho Idaho Falls	Pocatello Idaho
Boise Idaho Amity	19 Mar 2006	Idaho Boise	Boise Idaho
Boise Idaho Central	5 Feb 1984	Idaho Boise	Boise Idaho
Boise Idaho East	10 Jun 1979	Idaho Boise	Boise Idaho
Boise Idaho North	26 Sep 1965	Idaho Boise	Boise Idaho
Boise Idaho	3 Nov 1913	Idaho Boise	Boise Idaho
Boise Idaho West	7 Nov 1954	Idaho Boise	Boise Idaho
Boise Idaho YSA	24 Apr 1992	Idaho Boise	Boise Idaho
Bonners Ferry Idaho	13 Apr 2025	Idaho Coeur d'Alene	Spokane Washington
Burley Idaho Central	4 May 2025	Idaho Pocatello	Burley Idaho
Burley Idaho	27 Jul 1919	Idaho Pocatello	Burley Idaho
Burley Idaho West	22 May 1983	Idaho Pocatello	Burley Idaho
Caldwell Idaho East	9 Oct 1983	Idaho Boise	Meridian Idaho
Caldwell Idaho Lake Lowell	13 Sep 2026	Idaho Boise	Meridian Idaho
Caldwell Idaho Snake River	26 Mar 2023	Idaho Boise	Meridian Idaho
Caldwell Idaho	30 Jan 1972	Idaho Boise	Meridian Idaho
Carey Idaho	3 Aug 1919	Idaho Pocatello	Twin Falls Idaho
Chubbuck Idaho	17 Sep 1978	Idaho Pocatello	Pocatello Idaho
Coeur d'Alene Idaho	14 Oct 1962	Idaho Coeur d'Alene	Spokane Washington
Declo Idaho	27 Apr 1915	Idaho Pocatello	Burley Idaho
Driggs Idaho	2 Sep 1901	Idaho Idaho Falls	Rexburg Idaho
Eagle Idaho	12 Jan 1992	Idaho Boise	Meridian Idaho
Emmett Idaho	22 Sep 1974	Idaho Boise	Meridian Idaho
Filer Idaho	15 Jun 1980	Idaho Pocatello	Twin Falls Idaho
Firth Idaho	8 Sep 1974	Idaho Idaho Falls	Idaho Falls Idaho
Franklin Idaho	15 May 1983	Utah Ogden	Logan Utah
Grace Idaho	25 Jul 1898	Idaho Pocatello	Pocatello Idaho
Hayden Lake Idaho	7 Feb 1999	Idaho Coeur d'Alene	Spokane Washington
Idaho Falls Ammon West	1 May 1977	Idaho Idaho Falls	Idaho Falls Idaho
Idaho Falls Canterbury Park	12 Jan 2025	Idaho Idaho Falls	Idaho Falls Idaho
Idaho Falls Central	16 Oct 1983	Idaho Idaho Falls	Idaho Falls Idaho
Idaho Falls Eagle Rock	13 Dec 1987	Idaho Idaho Falls	Idaho Falls Idaho
Idaho Falls East	7 Jun 1959	Idaho Idaho Falls	Idaho Falls Idaho
Idaho Falls Green Valley	9 Jun 2024	Idaho Idaho Falls	Idaho Falls Idaho
Idaho Falls Lincoln	22 Jun 1980	Idaho Idaho Falls	Idaho Falls Idaho
Idaho Falls North	12 May 1935	Idaho Idaho Falls	Idaho Falls Idaho
Idaho Falls Pheasant Grove	9 Jun 2024	Idaho Idaho Falls	Idaho Falls Idaho
Idaho Falls South	30 Jun 1946	Idaho Idaho Falls	Idaho Falls Idaho
Idaho Falls	9 Jun 1895	Idaho Idaho Falls	Idaho Falls Idaho
Idaho Falls Taylor Mountain	17 Mar 1996	Idaho Idaho Falls	Idaho Falls Idaho
Idaho Falls West	4 Mar 1973	Idaho Idaho Falls	Idaho Falls Idaho
Idaho Falls YSA	16 Sep 2018	Idaho Idaho Falls	Idaho Falls Idaho
Iona Idaho South	19 Jan 2014	Idaho Idaho Falls	Idaho Falls Idaho
Iona Idaho	15 Apr 1973	Idaho Idaho Falls	Idaho Falls Idaho
Jerome Idaho	9 Mar 1952	Idaho Pocatello	Twin Falls Idaho
Kimberly Idaho East	23 Aug 2026	Idaho Pocatello	Twin Falls Idaho
Kimberly Idaho	15 Apr 1979	Idaho Pocatello	Twin Falls Idaho
Kuna Idaho East	19 Apr 2009	Idaho Boise	Boise Idaho
Kuna Idaho	26 Feb 1995	Idaho Boise	Boise Idaho
Lewiston Idaho North	19 Oct 1958	Idaho Coeur d'Alene	Spokane Washington
Lewiston Idaho South	15 Mar 2026	Idaho Coeur d'Alene	Spokane Washington
Malad Idaho	12 Feb 1888	Utah Ogden	Brigham City Utah
McCammon Idaho	15 Aug 1915	Idaho Pocatello	Pocatello Idaho
Menan Idaho	30 Mar 1980	Idaho Idaho Falls	Idaho Falls Idaho
Meridian Idaho East	12 Jun 1977	Idaho Boise	Boise Idaho
Meridian Idaho Fuller Park	17 Mar 2024	Idaho Boise	Meridian Idaho
Meridian Idaho Linder	21 Aug 2016	Idaho Boise	Meridian Idaho
Meridian Idaho North	21 Jan 2001	Idaho Boise	Meridian Idaho
Meridian Idaho Settlers Park	5 Feb 2006	Idaho Boise	Meridian Idaho
Meridian Idaho South	20 Feb 1983	Idaho Boise	Boise Idaho
Meridian Idaho	11 Jun 1972	Idaho Boise	Meridian Idaho
Meridian Idaho Victory	16 Oct 2016	Idaho Boise	Boise Idaho
Meridian Idaho West	12 Jan 1997	Idaho Boise	Meridian Idaho
Middleton Idaho East	16 Sep 2018	Idaho Boise	Meridian Idaho
Middleton Idaho	4 Mar 2007	Idaho Boise	Meridian Idaho
Montpelier Idaho South	22 Apr 1979	Idaho Pocatello	Star Valley Wyoming
Montpelier Idaho	23 Dec 1917	Idaho Pocatello	Star Valley Wyoming
Moore Idaho	18 Aug 1919	Idaho Idaho Falls	Idaho Falls Idaho
Moscow Idaho	5 May 1974	Idaho Coeur d'Alene	Spokane Washington
Mountain Home Idaho	19 May 1974	Idaho Boise	Boise Idaho
Nampa Idaho East	25 Feb 2001	Idaho Boise	Boise Idaho
Nampa Idaho North	7 Nov 2004	Idaho Boise	Meridian Idaho
Nampa Idaho Ridgevue	22 Nov 2020	Idaho Boise	Meridian Idaho
Nampa Idaho South	30 Oct 1977	Idaho Boise	Boise Idaho
Nampa Idaho West	27 Nov 1938	Idaho Boise	Boise Idaho
Nampa Idaho YSA	8 Mar 2020	Idaho Boise	Meridian Idaho
Nyssa Oregon (Note: Stake located outside Idaho with congregation(s) meeting in Idaho)	8 Jan 1950	Idaho Boise	Meridian Idaho
Oakley Idaho	19 Nov 1887	Idaho Pocatello	Burley Idaho
Ontario Oregon	18 Nov 1984	Idaho Boise	Meridian Idaho
Paris Idaho	20 Jun 1869	Idaho Pocatello	Logan Utah
Paul Idaho	24 Sep 1972	Idaho Pocatello	Burley Idaho
Pocatello Idaho Alameda	7 Aug 1898	Idaho Pocatello	Pocatello Idaho
Pocatello Idaho Central	17 Jun 1984	Idaho Pocatello	Pocatello Idaho
Pocatello Idaho East	22 Oct 1978	Idaho Pocatello	Pocatello Idaho
Pocatello Idaho Hawthorne	23 Aug 2026	Idaho Pocatello	Pocatello Idaho
Pocatello Idaho Highland South	24 Aug 2025	Idaho Pocatello	Pocatello Idaho
Pocatello Idaho Highland	12 May 1963	Idaho Pocatello	Pocatello Idaho
Pocatello Idaho North	21 Jun 1953	Idaho Pocatello	Pocatello Idaho
Pocatello Idaho	19 Apr 1959	Idaho Pocatello	Pocatello Idaho
Pocatello Idaho Tyhee	25 Sep 1983	Idaho Pocatello	Pocatello Idaho
Pocatello Idaho West	6 May 1945	Idaho Pocatello	Pocatello Idaho
Pocatello Idaho YSA	9 May 1965	Idaho Pocatello	Pocatello Idaho
Post Falls Idaho	20 Feb 2022	Idaho Coeur d'Alene	Spokane Washington
Preston Idaho East	9 Jun 2024	Utah Ogden	Logan Utah
Preston Idaho North	1 Jun 1884	Utah Ogden	Logan Utah
Preston Idaho South	6 Jun 1920	Utah Ogden	Logan Utah
Rexburg Idaho Center	24 Oct 1982	Idaho Idaho Falls	Rexburg Idaho
Rexburg Idaho East	1 Jun 1975	Idaho Idaho Falls	Rexburg Idaho
Rexburg Idaho Henry's Fork	2 Nov 2008	Idaho Idaho Falls	Rexburg Idaho
Rexburg Idaho Married Student 1st	6 Mar 1988	Idaho Idaho Falls	Rexburg Idaho
Rexburg Idaho Married Student 2nd	27 Feb 2005	Idaho Idaho Falls	Rexburg Idaho
Rexburg Idaho Married Student 3rd	24 Aug 2008	Idaho Idaho Falls	Rexburg Idaho
Rexburg Idaho Married Student 4th	23 Sep 2012	Idaho Idaho Falls	Rexburg Idaho
Rexburg Idaho North	28 Oct 1945	Idaho Idaho Falls	Rexburg Idaho
Rexburg Idaho South	17 Nov 1996	Idaho Idaho Falls	Rexburg Idaho
Rexburg Idaho	4 Feb 1884	Idaho Idaho Falls	Rexburg Idaho
Rexburg Idaho Teton River	7 Dec 2025	Idaho Idaho Falls	Rexburg Idaho
Rexburg Idaho West	12 Dec 2021	Idaho Idaho Falls	Rexburg Idaho
Rexburg Idaho YSA 1st	7 May 1965	Idaho Idaho Falls	Rexburg Idaho
Rexburg Idaho YSA 2nd	27 Apr 1969	Idaho Idaho Falls	Rexburg Idaho
Rexburg Idaho YSA 3rd	13 Apr 1975	Idaho Idaho Falls	Rexburg Idaho
Rexburg Idaho YSA 4th	21 Aug 2011	Idaho Idaho Falls	Rexburg Idaho
Rexburg Idaho YSA 5th	8 Dec 1991	Idaho Idaho Falls	Rexburg Idaho
Rexburg Idaho YSA 6th	19 Apr 1998	Idaho Idaho Falls	Rexburg Idaho
Rexburg Idaho YSA 7th	12 Oct 2003	Idaho Idaho Falls	Rexburg Idaho
Rexburg Idaho YSA 8th	11 Dec 2011	Idaho Idaho Falls	Rexburg Idaho
Rexburg Idaho YSA 9th	11 Dec 2011	Idaho Idaho Falls	Rexburg Idaho
Rexburg Idaho YSA 10th	14 Jun 2015	Idaho Idaho Falls	Rexburg Idaho
Rexburg Idaho YSA 11th	30 Sep 2018	Idaho Idaho Falls	Rexburg Idaho
Rigby Idaho East	7 Jul 1946	Idaho Idaho Falls	Idaho Falls Idaho
Rigby Idaho Garfield	13 Dec 2009	Idaho Idaho Falls	Idaho Falls Idaho
Rigby Idaho Holbrooke	11 Oct 2020	Idaho Idaho Falls	Idaho Falls Idaho
Rigby Idaho	3 Feb 1908	Idaho Idaho Falls	Idaho Falls Idaho
Ririe Idaho	25 May 1980	Idaho Idaho Falls	Rexburg Idaho
Rupert Idaho	11 May 1924	Idaho Pocatello	Burley Idaho
Rupert Idaho West	3 Jun 1984	Idaho Pocatello	Burley Idaho
Salmon Idaho	18 Oct 1953	Idaho Idaho Falls	Idaho Falls Idaho
Sandpoint Idaho	20 Aug 1978	Idaho Coeur d'Alene	Spokane Washington
Shelley Idaho East	8 Feb 2026	Idaho Idaho Falls	Idaho Falls Idaho
Shelley Idaho South	14 Sep 1980	Idaho Idaho Falls	Idaho Falls Idaho
Shelley Idaho	16 Aug 1914	Idaho Idaho Falls	Idaho Falls Idaho
Soda Springs Idaho	19 Nov 1916	Idaho Pocatello	Pocatello Idaho
St Anthony Idaho Juniper Mountain	30 Aug 2026	Idaho Idaho Falls	Rexburg Idaho
St Anthony Idaho Yellowstone	10 Jan 1909	Idaho Idaho Falls	Rexburg Idaho
Star Idaho	14 Aug 2011	Idaho Boise	Meridian Idaho
Sugar City Idaho	4 May 1980	Idaho Idaho Falls	Rexburg Idaho
Terreton Idaho	25 Mar 1973	Idaho Idaho Falls	Idaho Falls Idaho
Twin Falls Idaho East	19 Nov 2016	Idaho Pocatello	Twin Falls Idaho
Twin Falls Idaho South	14 Sep 2008	Idaho Pocatello	Twin Falls Idaho
Twin Falls Idaho	26 Jul 1919	Idaho Pocatello	Twin Falls Idaho
Twin Falls Idaho West	17 Aug 1969	Idaho Pocatello	Twin Falls Idaho
Ucon Idaho	29 Jun 1980	Idaho Idaho Falls	Idaho Falls Idaho
Weiser Idaho	27 Nov 1938	Idaho Boise	Meridian Idaho
Wendell Idaho	25 Feb 1979	Idaho Pocatello	Twin Falls Idaho

== Missions ==
Mission	Organized
Idaho Boise Mission	July 1, 1974
Idaho Coeur d’Alene Mission	July 1, 2026
Idaho Pocatello Mission	July 1, 1991
Idaho Idaho Falls Mission	July 1, 2016

In addition to these, the Utah Ogden Mission covers parts of southeastern Idaho, and the Washington Spokane Mission covers northern Idaho.

- In 2016, all four missions in the state had drastic changes made to their boundaries. Before the boundary changes the four missions were as listed: the Boise, Nampa, Pocatello, and Twin Falls missions. As a result of the boundary changes the Twin Falls mission was renamed to the Idaho Falls mission. The Boise mission was effectively cut in half, with the stakes in Eagle, Star, and Meridian transferred to the Nampa mission. The Boise mission lost a lot of territory on the west, but gained much more on the east by taking in the stakes that cover the Twin Falls, Burley and Rupert regions. The Nampa mission did not lose any ground, but gained a lot from the Boise mission, with the Meridian Idaho Temple within the mission's boundaries. The Twin Falls mission no longer exists. The Twin Falls, Rupert, and Burley regions were taken into the Boise mission, and the north east regions near Salmon were taken into the new Idaho Falls mission. The new Idaho Falls mission is headquartered in Idaho Falls. It will take in the Salmon region of the old Twin Falls mission, and take in the Rexburg and Idaho Falls regions of the Pocatello mission. The Pocatello mission was basically cut in half. The Rexburg, and Idaho Falls regions were taken into the new Idaho Falls mission. The changes were made in an attempt to make it easier for the full-time missionaries to work effectively with local church members. These changes were made as of July 1, 2016.

The Idaho Nampa and Idaho Twin Falls missions, which were created on July 1, 2013, were discontinued in 2019.

== Temples ==

Temples in Idaho

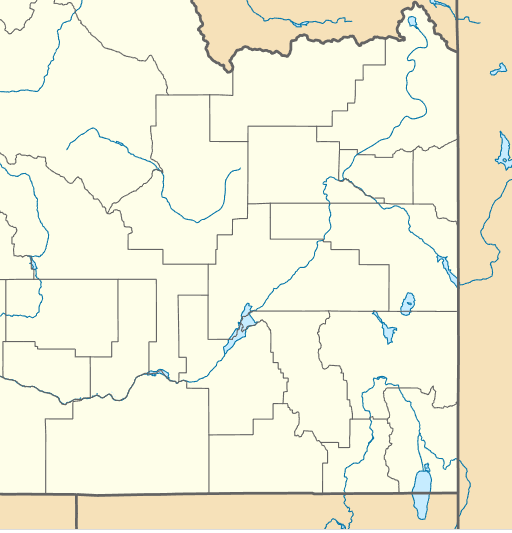

Temples in Eastern Idaho

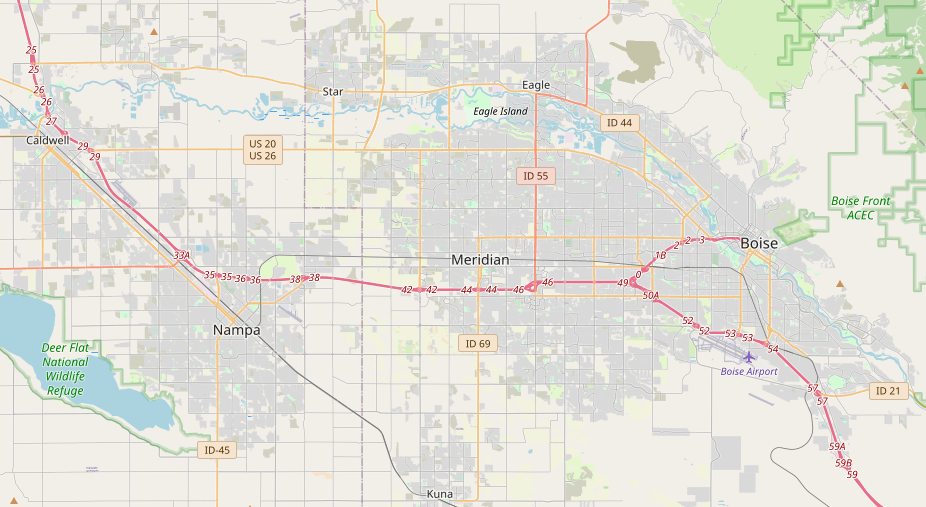

Temples in Boise

- = Operating
- = Under construction
- = Announced
- = Temporarily Closed

Following the dedication of the Pocatello Temple in 2021, there are six LDS temples in Idaho. Since then, five other temples have been announced.

8. Idaho Falls Idaho Temple; Official website; News & images	
Location: Announced: Groundbreaking: Dedicated: Rededicated: Size: Style:	Idaho Falls, Idaho, United States; March 3, 1937 by Heber J. Grant; December 19, 1939 by David Asael Smith; September 23, 1945 by George Albert Smith; June 4, 2017 by Henry B. Eyring; 116,250 sq ft (10,800 m^{2}) on a 7-acre (2.8 ha) site Modern, center spire - designed by John Fetzer, Sr.
27. Boise Idaho Temple; Official website; News & images	
Location: Announced: Groundbreaking: Dedicated: Rededicated: Size: Style: Notes:	Boise, Idaho, United States; March 31, 1982 by Spencer W. Kimball; December 18, 1982 by Mark E. Petersen; May 25, 1984 by Gordon B. Hinckley; May 29, 1987 by James E. Faust; 35,868 sq ft (3,332.2 m^{2}) on a 4.83-acre (1.95 ha) site Modern adaptation of six-spire design - designed by Church A&E Services; The rededication in 1987 was for an addition only. The Boise Idaho Temple was closed for additional renovations in July 2011 and rededicated in November 2012.
125. Rexburg Idaho Temple; Official website; News & images	
Location: Announced: Groundbreaking: Dedicated: Size: Style: Notes:	Rexburg, Idaho, U.S. December 20, 2003 by Gordon B. Hinckley; July 30, 2005 by John H. Groberg; February 10, 2008 by Thomas S. Monson; 57,504 sq ft (5,342.3 m^{2}) on a 10-acre (4.0 ha) site Classic modern, single-spire - designed by Architectural Nexus; Bob Petroff; First temple dedicated by Thomas S. Monson as President of the Church
128. Twin Falls Idaho Temple; Official website; News & images	
Location: Announced: Groundbreaking: Dedicated: Size: Notes:	Twin Falls, Idaho, U.S. October 2, 2004 by Gordon B. Hinckley; April 15, 2006 by Neil L. Andersen; August 24, 2008 by Thomas S. Monson; 31,245 sq ft (2,902.8 m^{2}) on a 9.1-acre (3.7 ha) site - designed by MHTN Architects, Inc; Fourth temple dedicated in Idaho and, during 2008, the second temple dedicated in Idaho that year.
158. Meridian Idaho Temple; Official website; News & images	
Location: Announced: Groundbreaking: Dedicated: Size:	Meridian, Idaho, U.S. April 2, 2011 by Thomas S. Monson; August 23, 2014 by David A. Bednar; November 19, 2017 by Dieter F. Uchtdorf; 67,331 sq ft (6,255.3 m^{2}) on a 15.73-acre (6.37 ha) site
170. Pocatello Idaho Temple; Official website; News & images	
Location: Announced: Groundbreaking: Dedicated: Size:	Pocatello, Idaho, United States; 2 April 2017 by Thomas S. Monson; 16 March 2019 by Wilford W. Andersen; 7 November 2021 by M. Russell Ballard; 71,125 sq ft (6,607.7 m^{2}) on a 10.94-acre (4.43 ha) site
212. Burley Idaho Temple; Official website; News & images	
Location: Announced: Groundbreaking: Dedicated: Size:	Burley, Idaho, United States; April 4, 2021 by Russell M. Nelson; 4 June 2022 by Brent H. Nielson; 11 January 2026 by Dallin H. Oaks; 45,300 sq ft (4,210 m^{2}) on a 10.12-acre (4.10 ha) site
226. Montpelier Idaho Temple (Dedication scheduled); Official website; News & images	
Location: Announced: Groundbreaking: Open House: Dedicated: Size:	Montpelier, Idaho; 3 April 2022 by Russell M. Nelson; 17 June 2023 by Ryan K. Olsen; 10-26 September 2026 scheduled for 18 October 2026; 34,730 sq ft (3,227 m^{2}) on a 2.6-acre (1.1 ha) site
245. Teton River Idaho Temple (Under construction); Official website; News & images	
Location: Announced: Groundbreaking: Size:	Rexburg, Idaho, U.S. 3 October 2021 by Russell M. Nelson; 1 June 2024 by Ricardo P. Giménez; 100,000 sq ft (9,300 m^{2}) on a 16.6-acre (6.7 ha) site
286. Coeur d'Alene Idaho Temple (Under construction); Official website; News & images	
Location: Announced: Groundbreaking: Size:	Coeur d'Alene, Idaho, United States; 6 October 2024 by Russell M. Nelson; 29 August 2026 by Hutch U. Fale; 29,630 sq ft (2,753 m^{2}) on a 10.91-acre (4.42 ha) site
377. Caldwell Idaho Temple (Site announced); Official website; News & images	
Location: Announced: Size:	Caldwell, Idaho; 6 April 2025 by Russell M. Nelson; 82,000 sq ft (7,600 m^{2}) on a 19.2-acre (7.8 ha) site

== Communities ==
Latter-day Saints have had a significant role in establishing and settling communities within the "Mormon Corridor", including the following in Idaho:

- Ammon
- Blackfoot
- Chesterfield
- Idaho Falls
- Franklin, Idaho
- Malad City
- Malta
- Mud Lake
- Oneida County
- Paris
- Pocatello
- Rexburg
- Sugar City
- Woodruff

== See also ==
- Religion in Idaho
- The Church of Jesus Christ of Latter-day Saints membership statistics (United States)
- Davis v. Beason
