= Boise Idaho Temple =

Latter-day Saint temple in Boise Idaho

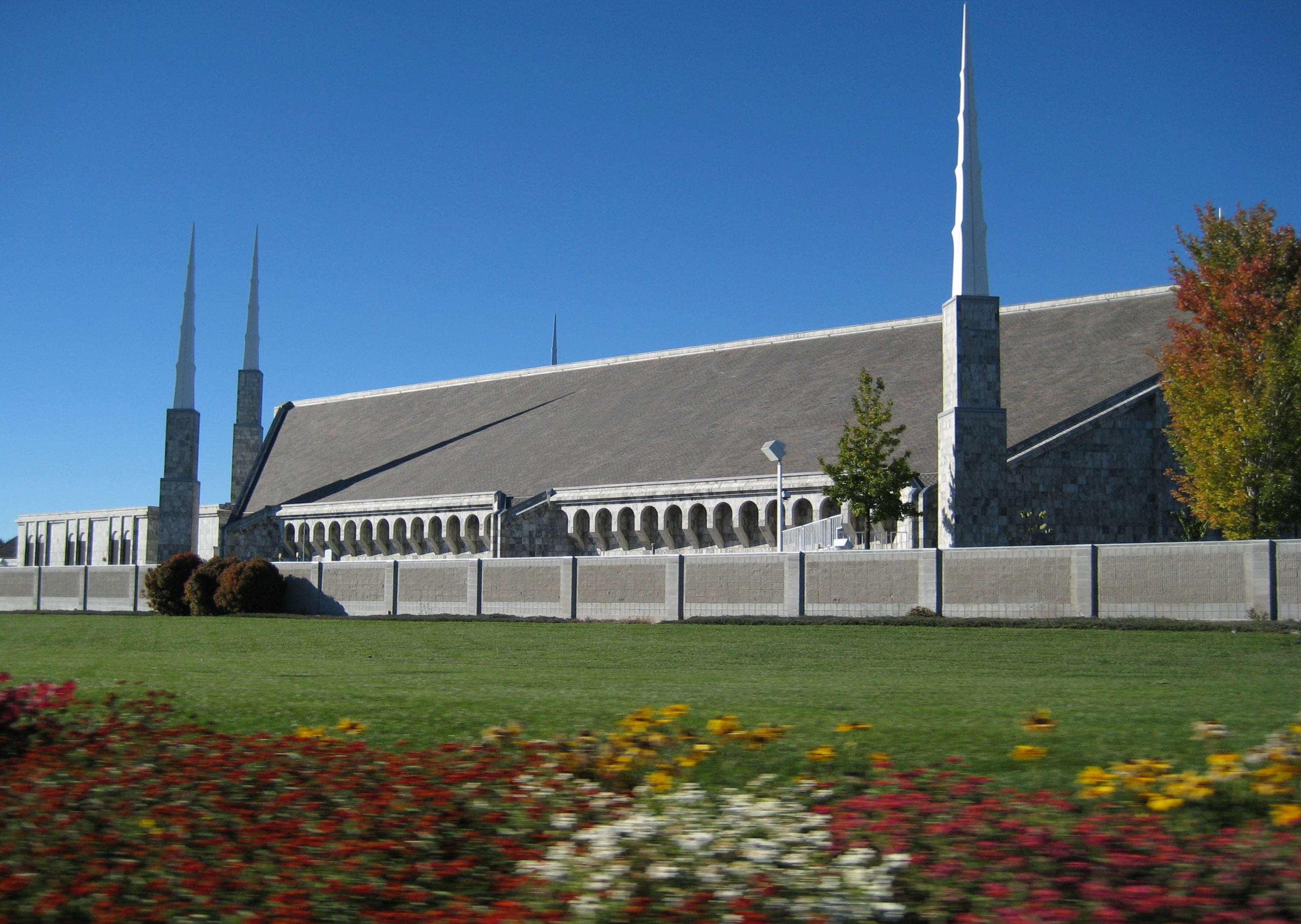
- Interactive map of Boise Idaho Temple
- Number: 27
- Dedication: May 25, 1984, by Gordon B. Hinckley
- Site: 4.83 acres (1.95 ha)
- Floor area: 35,868 ft^{2} (3,332.2 m^{2})
- Height: 112 ft (34 m)
- Official website • News & images

Church chronology
← Mexico City Mexico Temple	Boise Idaho Temple	→ Sydney Australia Temple

Additional information
- Announced: March 31, 1982, by Spencer W. Kimball
- Groundbreaking: December 18, 1982, by Mark E. Petersen
- Open house: May 1–19, 1984; October 13–November 10, 2012
- Rededicated: May 29, 1987, by James E. Faust; November 18, 2012, by Thomas S. Monson
- Current president: Brian Zarkou
- Designed by: Church A&E Services
- Location: Boise, Idaho, United States
- Coordinates: 43°35′36.68279″N 116°16′30.12240″W
- Exterior finish: Light-colored marble face with a slate roof
- Design: Modern adaptation of six-spire design
- Baptistries: 1
- Ordinance rooms: 4 (stationary)
- Sealing rooms: 4
- Notes: The rededication in 1987 was for an addition only. The Boise Idaho Temple was closed for additional renovations in July 2011 and rededicated in November 2012.

The Boise Idaho Temple is the 29th constructed and 27th operating temple of the Church of Jesus Christ of Latter-day Saints. The temple is located in the city of Boise, Idaho. The intent to build the temple was announced on March 31, 1982, by Gordon B. Hinckley under the direction of church president Spencer W. Kimball during a press conference. The temple was the second to be built in Idaho and is the only Idaho temple dedicated by Hinckley.

== History ==
Church leaders discussed building a temple in the western part of Idaho as early as 1939. However, with the majority of the church's membership in the eastern part of Idaho, the leaders decided against it and concentrated on building the Idaho Falls Idaho Temple.

Forty-five years later, on March 31, 1982, church leaders announced that a temple would be built in the Boise area. The temple site is located near an exit from Interstate 84 and is visible to those traveling along the highway and for pilots using the Boise Airport.

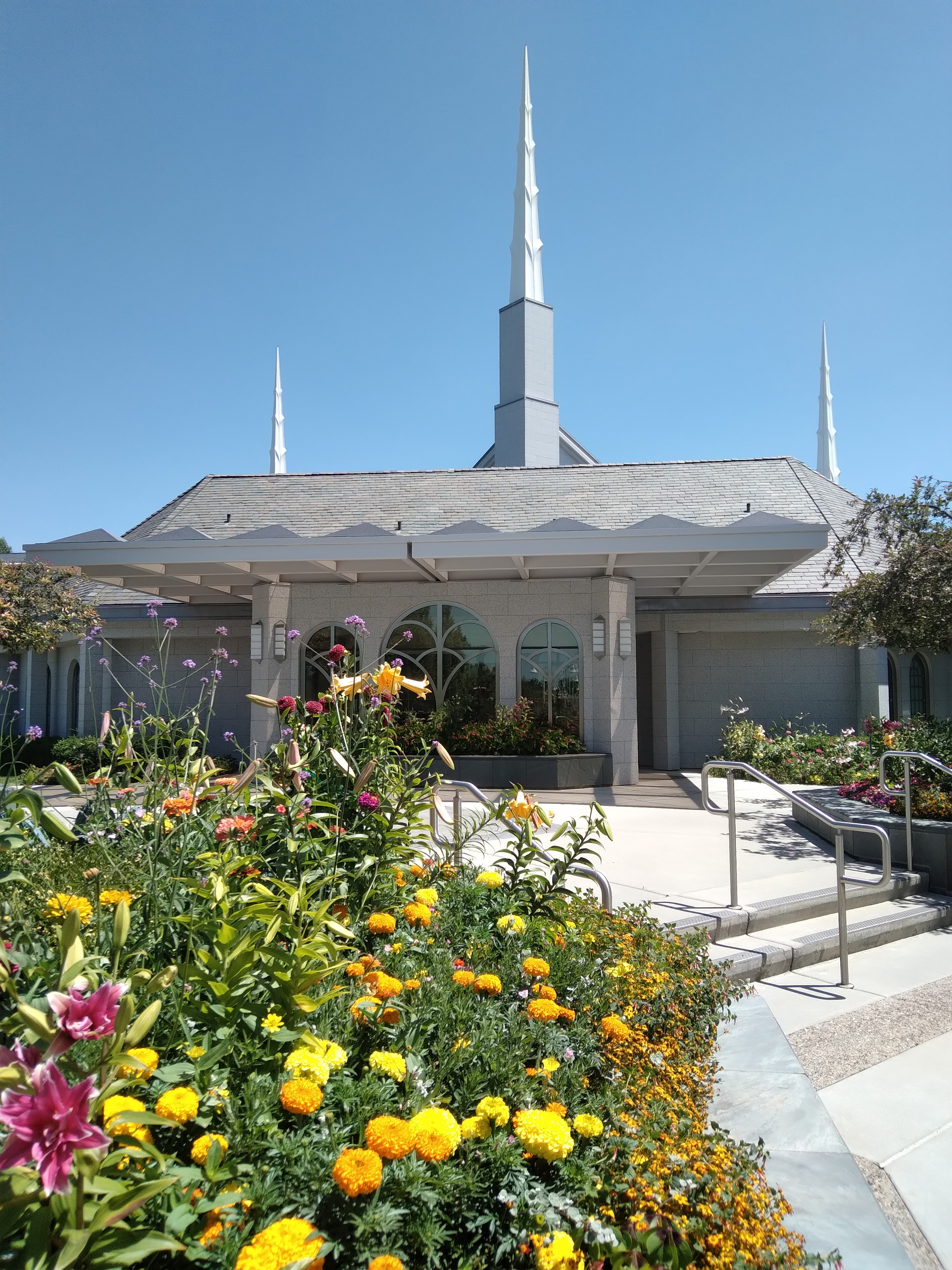
The front entrance of the temple.

A groundbreaking ceremony took place on December 18, 1982, marking the commencement of construction. The ceremony was presided over by Mark E. Petersen and attended by local church members and community leaders.

The temple was completed in 1984, with an open house to be held from May 1–19, 1984. It was anticipated that 70,000 visitors would tour the temple during the nineteen-day open house, but over 128,000 attended. The open house brought an increased interest in the church. The Boise Idaho Temple was dedicated May 25, 1984 by Hinckley. Temple attendance was much higher than expected, so it was closed for renovation in October 1986. Following renovation, the temple was rededicated in 1987 by James E. Faust. After reopening, the temple served more than 100,000 members in southwestern Idaho and part of eastern Oregon.

In 2020, like all others in the church, the Boise Idaho Temple was closed for a time in response to the coronavirus pandemic.

== Design and architecture ==
The Boise Idaho Temple has a total of 35,325 square feet (3,281.8 m2), four ordinance rooms, and four sealing rooms. It was built with a sloping roof & six-spire design. The architecture reflects both the cultural heritage of the Boise area and its spiritual significance to the church.

The temple is on a 4.83-acre plot, and the landscaping around the temple features trees, shrubs, and a large fountain. These elements are designed to provide a tranquil setting that enhances the sacred atmosphere of the site.

The structure stands 112 feet tall, constructed with white granite. The exterior has by six white spires and a statue of the angel Moroni, each chosen for their symbolic significance and alignment with temple traditions.

The interior has green, blue, and earth tones, centered around the celestial room, which is designed to create a spiritually uplifting environment and features stained glass as well as a large crystal chandelier. The temple includes a baptistry, four ordinance rooms, and three sealing rooms, each arranged for ceremonial use.

The design uses symbolic elements representing the temple's importance to Idaho, providing deeper spiritual meaning to its appearance and function. The interior decorations make repeated use of the syringa, which is Idaho's state flower.

== Renovation ==
Over the years, the Boise Idaho Temple has undergone several renovations to preserve its structural integrity, update facilities, and enhance its spiritual and aesthetic appeal. The first renovation project commenced in 1986, just two years after the temple was dedicated. A new annex and baptistry were added, and the temple was rededicated in February 1987 after being closed for a year.

On May 20, 2011, church leadership announced that the temple would again close for extensive renovations. The temple closed on July 11, 2011, for extensive renovations and was rededicated on November 18, 2012, by church president Thomas S. Monson. Preceding the rededication an open house was held between October 13 and November 10, excluding Sundays. The renovation included work on the heating and cooling systems and a reconfiguration of the floor plan to make it more efficient. Most visibly, the marble tiles that covered the temple were removed and replaced with gray granite tiles.

Throughout the renovation process, efforts were made to maintain the temple's historical and spiritual significance. For example, when windows were replaced, the old windows were crushed so they could be transformed into art glass and used as interior decoration.

== Temple presidents ==
The church's temples are directed by a temple president and matron, each serving for a term of three years. The president and matron oversee the administration of temple operations and provide guidance and training for both temple patrons and staff.

The first president of the Boise Idaho Temple was Seth D. Redford, with the matron being Thelma F. Redford. They served from 1984 to 1987. As of 2024, Brian K. Zarkou is the president, with Mary C. Zarkou serving as matron.

== Admittance ==
Before the temple's dedication by Gordon B. Hinckley on May 25, 1984, a public open house was held from May 1–19, 1984 (excluding Sundays). During the open house, 128,716 visitors of all faiths toured the temple.

The temple was closed for renovations from July 2011 to October 2012. Following this renovation period, the temple was again open to the public for an open house that ran from October 13 to November 10, 2012. Nearly 170,000 people visited the temple during the open house. The temple was rededicated by Thomas S. Monson on November 18, 2012.

Like all the church's temples, it is not used for Sunday worship services. To members of the church, temples are regarded as sacred houses of the Lord. Once dedicated, only church members with a current temple recommend can enter for worship.

== See also ==
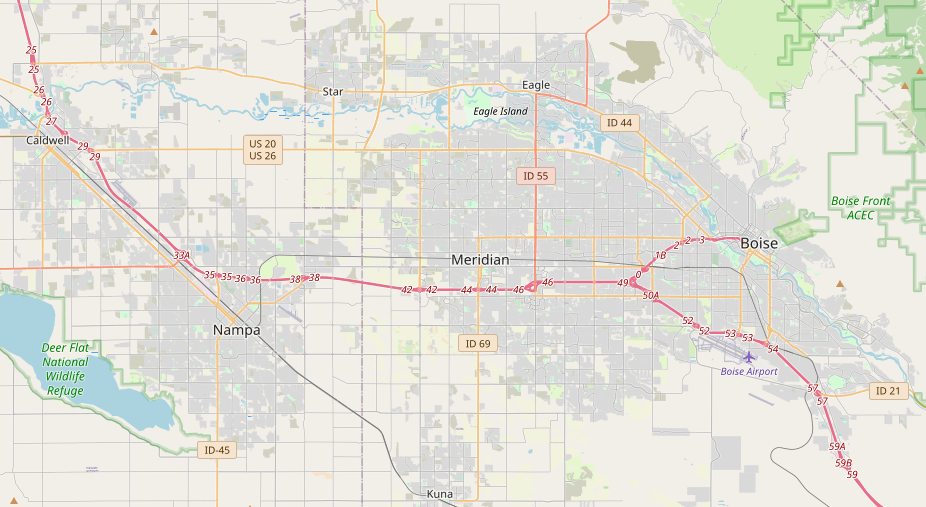

Temples in Boise Metro

Eastern Idaho Temples
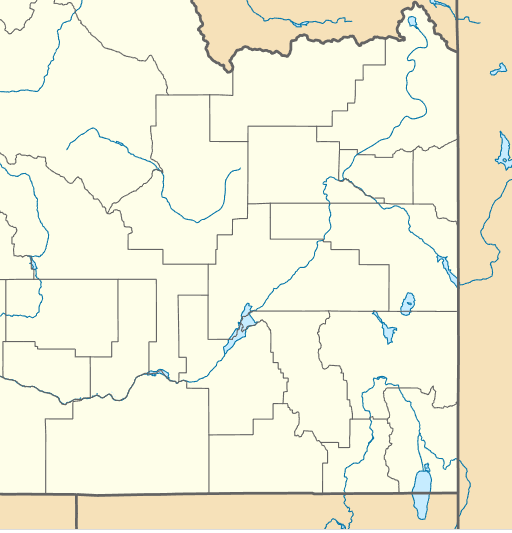
Temples in Eastern Idaho
Idaho Map

Temples in Idaho
- = Operating
- = Under construction
- = Announced
- = Temporarily Closed

- Harold G. Hillam, a former temple president
- Comparison of temples of The Church of Jesus Christ of Latter-day Saints
- List of temples of The Church of Jesus Christ of Latter-day Saints
- List of temples of The Church of Jesus Christ of Latter-day Saints by geographic region
- Temple architecture (Latter-day Saints)
- The Church of Jesus Christ of Latter-day Saints in Idaho
