= Curitiba Brazil Temple =

Temple of the LDS church

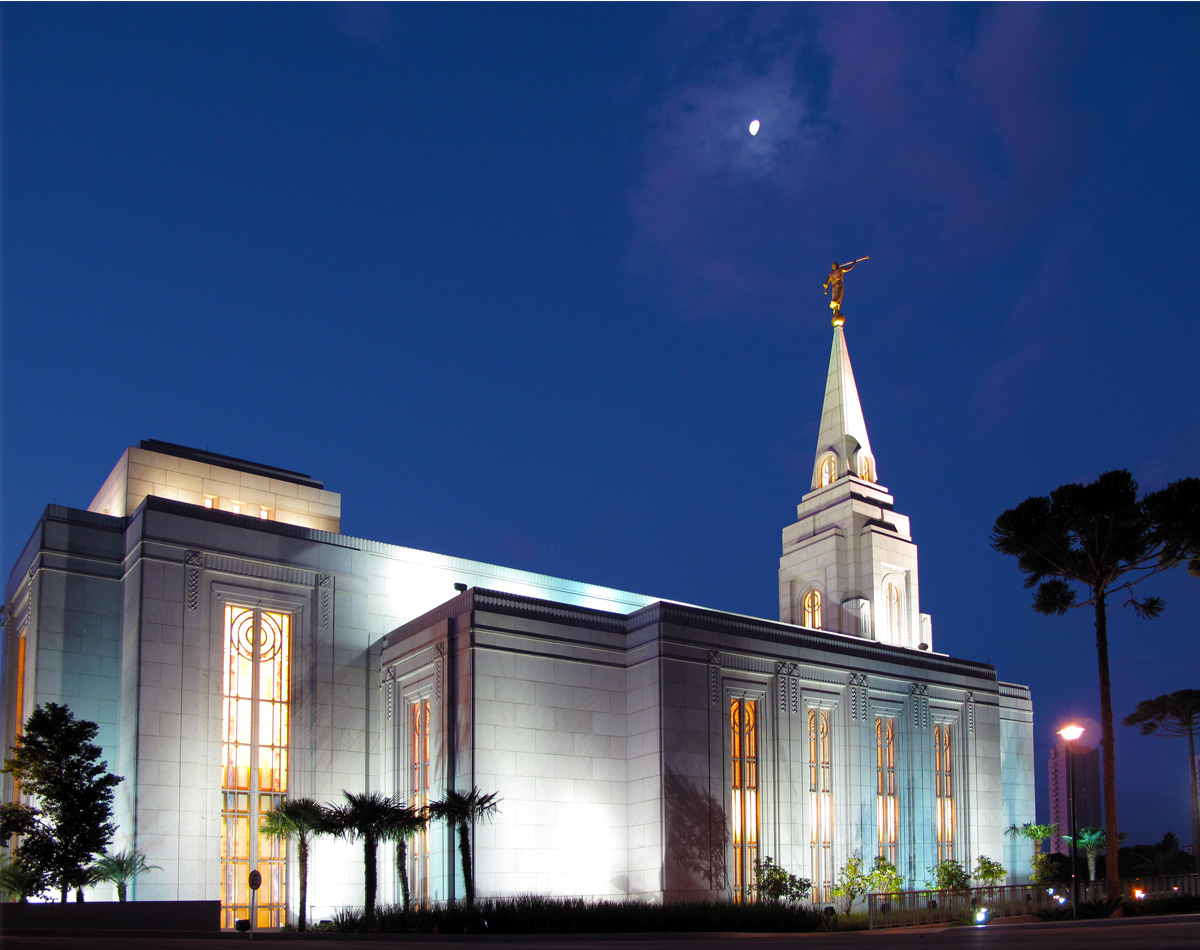
- Interactive map of Curitiba Brazil Temple
- Number: 126
- Dedication: 1 June 2008, by Thomas S. Monson
- Site: 8.15 acres (3.30 ha)
- Floor area: 27,850 ft^{2} (2,587 m^{2})
- Height: 125 ft (38 m)
- Official website • News & images

Church chronology
← Rexburg Idaho Temple	Curitiba Brazil Temple	→ Panama City Panama Temple

Additional information
- Announced: 23 August 2002, by Gordon B. Hinckley
- Groundbreaking: 10 March 2005, by Russell M. Nelson
- Open house: 10 May – 24 May 2008
- Current president: Paulo Roberto Cooper
- Designed by: Jeronimo da Cunha Lima and GSBS
- Location: Curitiba, Brazil
- Coordinates: 25°26′28.69439″S 49°20′31.69679″W
- Exterior finish: Sienna white granite over reinforced concrete; granite native to the state of Espírito Santo, Brazil
- Design: Classic modern, single-spire design
- Baptistries: 1
- Ordinance rooms: 2 (two-stage progressive)
- Sealing rooms: 2

The Curitiba Brazil Temple is a temple of the Church of Jesus Christ of Latter-day Saints (LDS Church) in Curitiba, Paraná, Brazil. Construction of the temple was announced in a letter to local leaders on August 23, 2002. The temple was completed and dedicated Thomas S. Monson on June 1, 2008. It is the fifth in Brazil and the church's 126th worldwide.

== History ==
As early as 1953 there was mention of the building of a temple in the region of Curitiba. That year LDS Church president Spencer W. Kimball, while dedicating a LDS meetinghouse in Ipoméia, stated, "One day, in this region, there will be a temple of the Lord." The construction of the Curitiba Brazil Temple was announced on August 23, 2002. At the same time, letters were sent to local church leaders also announcing the Panama City Panama Temple. Church president Gordon B. Hinckley selected the temple site in 2004 during his travels to rededicate the São Paulo Brazil Temple.

The groundbreaking ceremony took place on March 10, 2005. Russell M. Nelson, of the Quorum of the Twelve Apostles, presided at the ceremony and dedicated the site in Portuguese.

Following completion of construction, the temple was dedicated by Monson on June 1, 2008. Monson was joined by Russell M. Nelson and Charles Didier, president of the church's Brazil Area. Monson's trip to dedicate the temple was his first trip outside North America as church president.

Upon completion and dedication, the temple was the fifth such building in Brazil and 126th operating temple of the church worldwide.

== Design and architecture ==
The temple is on an 8.15-acre plot in the Campo Comprido district of western Curitiba, The landscaping around the temple has a large water feature, gardens, and numerous trees.

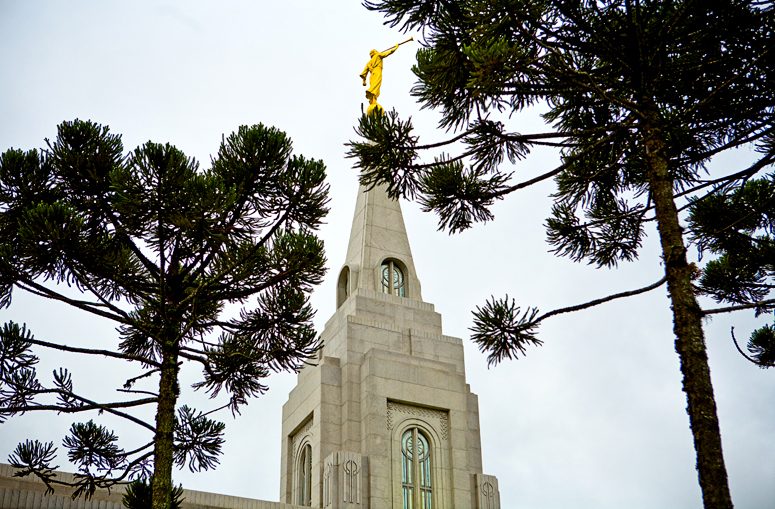
Angel Moroni statue on spire

== See also ==
- List of temples of The Church of Jesus Christ of Latter-day Saints
- Temple architecture (Latter-day Saints)
- The Church of Jesus Christ of Latter-day Saints in Brazil
