= Montpelier Idaho Temple =

- Dedication scheduled
- Interactive map of Montpelier Idaho Temple
- Number: 226
- Dedication: 18 October 2026, by TBA
- Site: 2.6 acres (1.1 ha)
- Floor area: 34,730 ft^{2} (3,227 m^{2})
- Official website • News & images

Additional information
- Announced: 3 April 2022, by Russell M. Nelson
- Groundbreaking: 17 June 2023, by Ryan K. Olsen
- Open house: 10–26 September 2026
- Current president: Bart Orr Christensen
- Location: Montpelier, Idaho
- Coordinates: 42°19′05″N 111°18′06″W
- Baptistries: 1
- Ordinance rooms: 2
- Sealing rooms: 2

The Montpelier Idaho Temple is a temple of the Church of Jesus Christ of Latter-day Saints awaiting dedication in Montpelier, Idaho. The intent to build the temple was announced by church president Russell M. Nelson on April 3, 2022, during the April 2022 general conference. It was one of 17 announced at the conference, and the 99th during Nelson's presidency.

The temple is a two-story building of 34,370 square feet, built on a 2.6-acre site, and located at 534 Washington St. in Montpelier. It has a white, brick-like façade on the exterior, tall arched windows and entryways on the front, and rectangular windows on the sides. Its design incorporates southeastern Idaho landscapes, with motifs including the chicory flower. The groundbreaking and site dedication was held June 17, 2023, with Ryan K. Olsen, a general authority, presiding.

With construction completed, a public open house is in progress from September 10–26, 2026, excluding Sundays. The temple is scheduled for dedication on October 18, 2026. It will be the church's eighth in Idaho, Bear Lake Valley's first, and the state's southernmost and easternmost temple.

== History ==
Montpelier was settled by Latter-day Saints in 1864 and was known by several names. Church president Brigham Young gave the settlement the name “Montpelier” after his birthplace, the capital of Vermont.

As of 2026, Idaho has more than 482,000 Latter-day Saints across 1,300 congregations. Montpelier has at times also been home to three church presidents: Harold B. Lee, Ezra Taft Benson, and Howard W. Hunter. The temple district is unique due to including communities across three separate states, including six stakes along Idaho, Utah, and Wyoming.

The site previously housed Montpelier City Hall, which was demolished in March 2021, along with several other small homes that occupied portions of the property, a year before the temple was announced. These changes led to speculation from local residents that the church would build a temple there. Montpelier Mayor Ted Slivinski knew for several months beforehand, but did not announce it due to a nondisclosure agreement. At the time of the announcement, the town had a population of around 2,600 people. It is hoped the temple's presence can economically revitalize the city’s downtown district.

The intent to build the temple was announced April 3, 2022, during the April 2022 general conference by Russell M. Nelson. It was one of 17 announced during the conference, and the 99th temple announced during Nelson’s presidency.

Less than seven weeks later, on May 20, 2022, the location and size of the temple were announced. It was planned to be a two-story structure, with about 27,000 square feet, and built on the corner of Washington Street and Sixth Street. The size of the completed temple is 34,370 square feet.

The first rendering of the temple was released on April 25, 2023. The groundbreaking and site dedication was held June 17, 2023, with Ryan K. Olsen, of the Seventy, presiding. Over 600 people were in attendance, including local church leaders and members. It was the same date as the groundbreaking for the Belo Horizonte Brazil Temple. After the public open house, the temple is planned to be dedicated October 18, 2026.

== Architecture and design ==
The temple is a two-story building of 34,370 square feet built on a 2.6 acre site. It has a white, brick-like façade on the exterior, tall arched windows and entryways on the front, and rectangular windows on the sides. It has a tower on a square base, with an arched roof and arched windows on each side.

Its design reflects southeastern Idaho landscapes. Motifs include the chicory flower, appearing in different places in the temple in various stages of blooming. Colors like coral, blues, greens, and gold are intended to signify colors of local wildflowers, and the color of Bear Lake, which is 15 miles south. Art glass windows include details like mountains, a lake, a bud detail, and simple linework borders. Flooring is made up of “aurora light stone”, with blue and gold carpeting, and wall to wall rugs in some areas.

The temple grounds include a pathway through a fenced in garden with flowers and trees. Across the street is the Montpelier Tabernacle, a 1,200 seat building completed in 1917, which was Art Deco, Prairie, and Neoclassical architectural influences.

It will be the church's eighth temple in Idaho, the state’s southernmost and easternmost,. and the Bear Lake Valley’s first.

== Admission and leadership ==
A public open house is in progress until 26, 2026, excluding Sundays. The dedication is planned for October 18, 2026. Once dedicated, only members of the church with a temple recommend are allowed to enter. Bart O. Christensen and Cherie Christensen will serve as the first temple president and matron.

Like all the church's temples, it is not used for Sunday worship services. To members of the church, temples are regarded as sacred houses of the Lord. Once dedicated, only church members with a current temple recommend can enter for worship.

== See also ==
- Comparison of temples (LDS Church)
- List of temples (LDS Church)
- List of temples by geographic region (LDS Church)
- Temple architecture (LDS Church)
