= Idaho Falls Idaho Temple =

Temple of the LDS Church

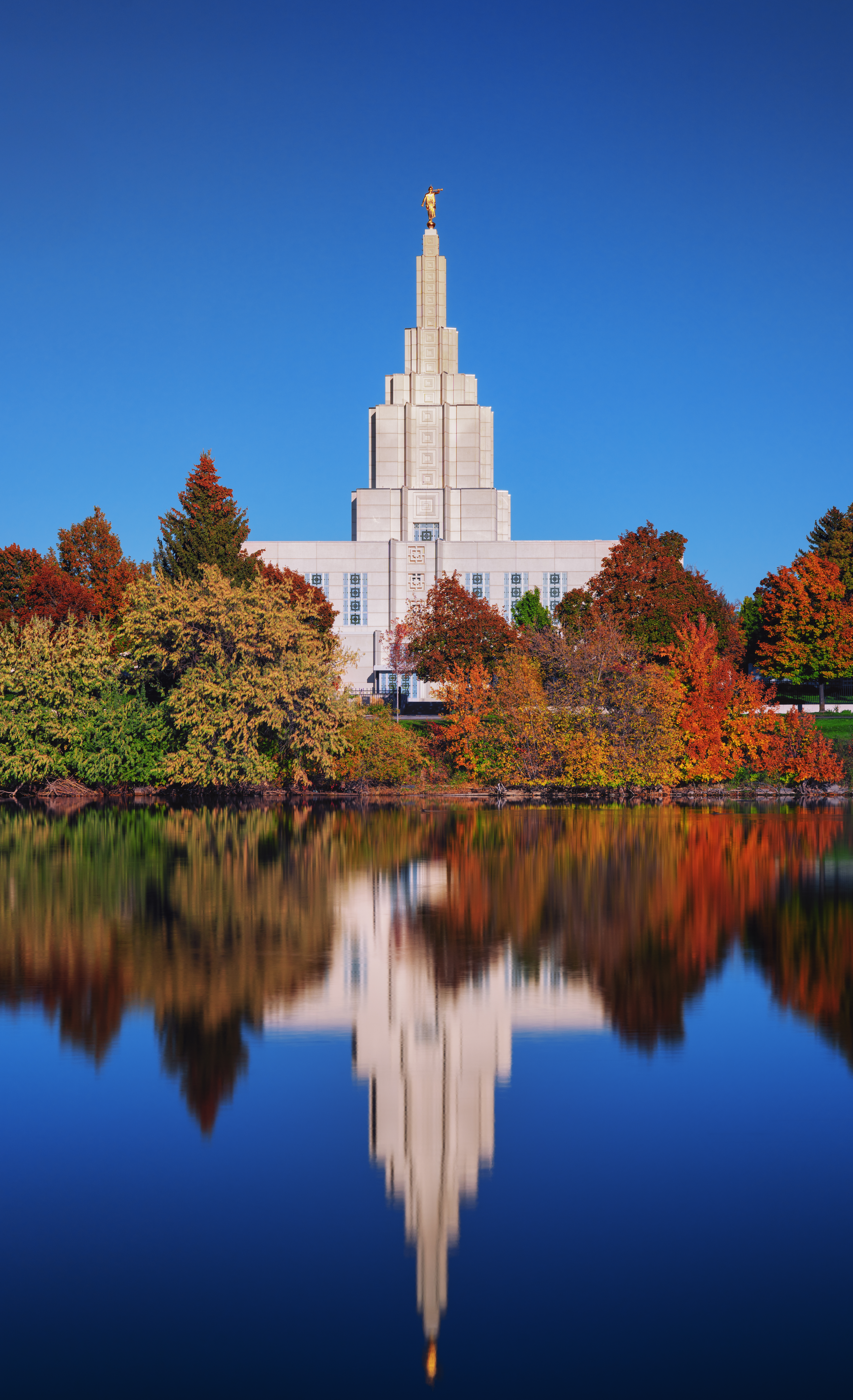
- Temple from across Snake River in 2022
- Interactive map of Idaho Falls Idaho Temple
- Number: 8
- Dedication: September 23, 1945, by George Albert Smith
- Site: 7 acres (2.8 ha)
- Floor area: 116,250 ft^{2} (10,800 m^{2})
- Height: 143 ft (44 m)
- Official website • News & images

Church chronology
← Mesa Arizona Temple	Idaho Falls Idaho Temple	→ Bern Switzerland Temple

Additional information
- Announced: March 3, 1937, by Heber J. Grant
- Groundbreaking: December 19, 1939, by David Asael Smith
- Open house: September 15–20, 1945; April 22 – May 20, 2017 (following renovations)
- Rededicated: June 4, 2017, by Henry B. Eyring
- Current president: Kevin D. McCracken
- Designed by: John Fetzer, Sr.
- Location: Idaho Falls, Idaho, United States
- Coordinates: 43°29′59.34840″N 112°2′29.39999″W
- Exterior finish: Concrete
- Design: Modern, center spire
- Baptistries: 1
- Ordinance rooms: 4 (four-stage progressive)
- Sealing rooms: 9
- Clothing rental: Yes
- Visitors' center: Yes

The Idaho Falls Idaho Temple (formerly the Idaho Falls Temple) is a temple of the Church of Jesus Christ of Latter-day Saints in Idaho Falls, Idaho. The intent to build the temple was announced on March 3, 1937, by church president Heber J. Grant during the church's general conference. It is the church's tenth constructed and eighth operating temple, the first built in Idaho, and the first built with a modern single-spire design.

The Idaho Falls Idaho Temple is adjacent to the Snake River. This temple was designed by the church board of temple architects: Edward O. Anderson, Georgious Y. Cannon, Ramm Hansen, John Fetzer, Hyrum Pope, and Lorenzo Snow Young. Designs were submitted by each architect, and Fetzer's, influenced by the Book of Mormon, was chosen. Key events in its history include the groundbreaking ceremony held on December 19, 1939, and its dedication, conducted by George Albert Smith on September 23, 1945. With its dedication to sacred spaces, the Idaho Falls Idaho Temple reflects the church's commitment to spiritual practices and community enrichment.

== History ==
The history of the Idaho Falls Idaho Temple begins with its announcement by Heber J. Grant on March 3, 1927. The site for the temple was selected due to the expansion of the church in southeastern Idaho. The groundbreaking ceremony, took place on December 19, 1939, marking the commencement of construction. This ceremony was presided over by David Smith and attended by local church members and community leaders.

The exterior of the temple was completed in September 1941 and the interior was expected to be completed the following year. However, with World War II shortages, it delayed the completion of the temple for four more years. Church president George Albert Smith dedicated the temple one month after the war ended, on September 23, 1945. This is the only temple Smith dedicated. The dedication was significant for the church, providing another sacred place of worship for its members.

In 1983, the temple was the first of many temples to receive an angel Moroni statue after its original dedication, in this case nearly 40 years later.

The building's name was changed from the Idaho Falls Temple to the Idaho Falls Idaho Temple in 1999 when the church introduced standardized naming conventions for its temples.

Throughout its history, the Idaho Falls Idaho Temple has served as a center of spiritual growth, playing a vital role in the lives of church members in the region.

== Design and Architecture ==
The temple was built on a 7-acre (2.8 ha) plot. For ordinances performed, it has four rooms used for the endowment, nine sealing rooms, and one baptismal font. The total floor area is 92,177 square feet (8,563.5 m^{2}). The temple is two stories tall and is constructed with white quartz, cast stone (white cement), and concrete. The exterior features a center spire, tapered tower architecture, and overview of Snake River, while the interior is adorned with hand-painted murals and stained glass windows.

The temple's architectural style blends elements of Art Deco and international styles with traditional temple designs. Designed by John Fetzer, the temple's architecture reflects both the cultural heritage of Idaho Falls and the spiritual significance of the church.

One of the focal points of the temple is its hand-painted mural in the celestial room. The Idaho Falls Idaho, Los Angeles California, and Hamilton New Zealand temples are the only ones with hand-painted murals in the celestial room, which is designed to create a spiritually uplifting atmosphere.

Incorporated into the design are symbolic elements representing the Bible and the Book of Mormon, which provide church members with deeper spiritual meaning to the temple's appearance and function. Symbolism is an important component of worship for church members. These symbols include the central spire and baptismal font. To members of the church, the central spire represents reaching upwards to heaven. In the temple, baptismal fonts rest on the back of 12 oxen, symbolizing the twelve tribes of Israel and the strength and power of God’s work.

The landscaping around the temple features ponds with waterfalls, pine trees, and flower gardens.

== Renovations ==
Over the years, the temple has undergone several renovations to preserve its structural integrity, update facilities, and enhance its spiritual and aesthetic appeal. The most significant renovation project commenced in 2015.

In March 2015, the temple closed for renovations that were expected to last 18 months. The renovations took nearly two years and following their completion, a public open house was held from April 22 through May 20, 2017. The temple was rededicated by Henry B. Eyring on June 4, 2017. The evening prior to the rededication, a youth cultural celebration, outlining the church's and the temple's history in the region and titled "Temple by the River Reflections" was held at Holt Arena. Approximately 11,000 youth participated in the event, which took a year of planning. The 70-minute program included costumes made with 27 miles of cloth.

The renovation of the temple focused on several key areas, including mechanical and electrical upgrades, a 20,000 square foot extension, a 46-room extension, and new windows. These changes were made to ensure the temple's compliance with contemporary building standards and to accommodate the evolving needs of the church and its members.

One of the notable aspects of the renovation was the restoration of the original murals. This particular enhancement served to preserve and restore the hand-painted murals throughout the temple.

Throughout the renovation process, care was taken to maintain the temple's historical and spiritual significance. Artisans and craftsmen specializing in preservation and restoration were employed to ensure that both the exterior and interior renovations were in keeping with the original design ethos while incorporating modern advancements.

The renovated Idaho Falls Idaho Temple was rededicated on June 4, 2017, by Henry B. Eyring.

== Cultural and community impact ==
The Idaho Falls Idaho Temple has made an impact on both the cultural landscape and the local community. Since its establishment in 1945, the temple has not only been a place of worship for church members but has also represented church expansion as the first temple built in Idaho.

The temple plays a role in both educating and spiritually uplifting the local church community. The adjacent visitors' center, equipped with exhibits on teachings from modern prophets, the importance of families, and the Book of Mormon, which provides educational resources for both members and non-members with an in-depth understanding of the restoration of the church and the temple's unique place in its history. Entry into the temple is available to those church members who hold a valid temple recommend.

== Temple president ==
Since its dedication in 1945, the Idaho Falls Idaho Temple has been overseen by a series of temple presidents, many serving for a term of three years. The first temple president was David Smith, who served from 1943 to 1949.

A notable temple presidentis John H. Groberg (2005–08). Groberg's parents, Delbert V. and Jennie Groberg, also served as president and matron of the temple from 1975 to 1980.

As of 2022, Patrick Michael Poston is the current temple president.

== See also ==
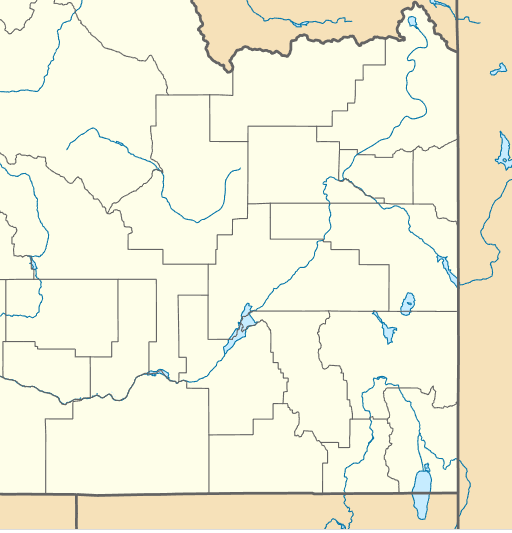

Temples in Eastern Idaho

Boise Metro Temples
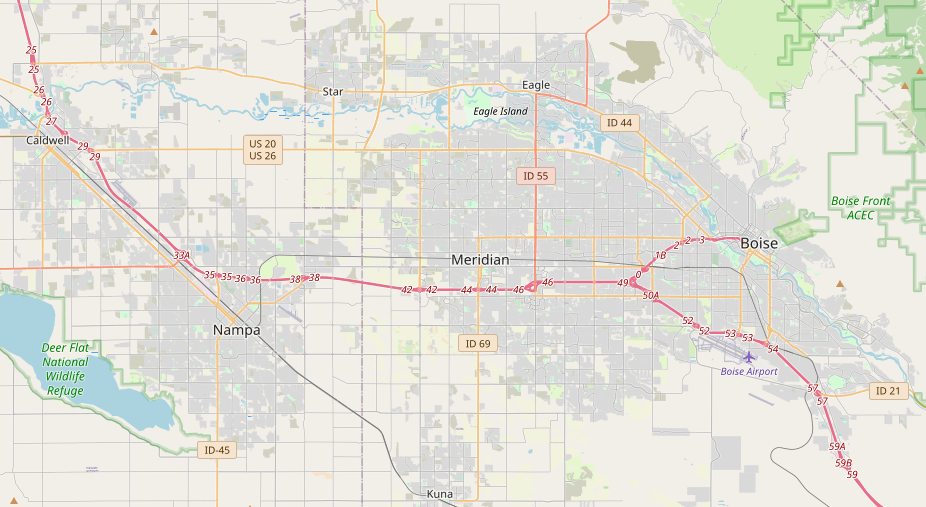
Temples in Boise Metro
Idaho Map

Temples in Idaho
- = Operating
- = Under construction
- = Announced
- = Temporarily Closed

- Comparison of temples of The Church of Jesus Christ of Latter-day Saints
- List of temples of The Church of Jesus Christ of Latter-day Saints
- List of temples of The Church of Jesus Christ of Latter-day Saints by geographic region
- Temple architecture (Latter-day Saints)
- The Church of Jesus Christ of Latter-day Saints in Idaho
