= Thomas S. Monson =

President of the Church of Jesus Christ of Latter-Day Saints (1927–2018)

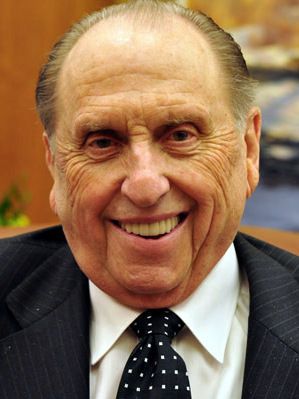
- Monson in 2009

16th President of the Church of Jesus Christ of Latter-day Saints
- February 3, 2008 – January 2, 2018
- Predecessor: Gordon B. Hinckley
- Successor: Russell M. Nelson

President of the Quorum of the Twelve Apostles (with Boyd K. Packer as Acting President)
- March 12, 1995 – February 3, 2008
- Predecessor: Gordon B. Hinckley
- Successor: Boyd K. Packer
- End reason: Became President of the Church

First Counselor in the First Presidency
- March 12, 1995 – January 27, 2008
- Called by: Gordon B. Hinckley
- Predecessor: Gordon B. Hinckley
- Successor: Henry B. Eyring
- End reason: Dissolution of First Presidency upon the death of Gordon B. Hinckley

Second Counselor in the First Presidency
- November 10, 1985 – March 3, 1995
- Called by: Ezra Taft Benson
- Predecessor: Gordon B. Hinckley
- Successor: James E. Faust
- End reason: Dissolution of First Presidency upon the death of Howard W. Hunter

Quorum of the Twelve Apostles
- October 4, 1963 – November 10, 1985
- Called by: David O. McKay
- End reason: Called as Second Counselor in the First Presidency

LDS Church Apostle
- October 10, 1963 – January 2, 2018
- Called by: David O. McKay
- Reason: Death of Henry D. Moyle; N. Eldon Tanner added to First Presidency
- Reorganization at end of term: Gerrit W. Gong and Ulisses Soares were ordained following deaths of Monson and Robert D. Hales

Military career
- 1945–1946
- Service/branch: U.S. Navy
- Rank: Ensign
- Unit: U.S. Naval Reserve

Personal details
- Born: August 21, 1927; Salt Lake City, Utah, U.S.
- Died: January 2, 2018 (aged 90); Salt Lake City, Utah, U.S.
- Education: University of Utah (BS); Brigham Young University (MBA)
- Spouse(s): Frances Beverly Johnson (m. 1948; died 2013)
- Children: 3
- Awards: Silver Buffalo; Bronze Wolf; Honor Medal
- Website: thomassmonson.org
- Signature

Thomas Spencer Monson (August 21, 1927 – January 2, 2018) was an American religious leader, author, and the 16th president of the Church of Jesus Christ of Latter-day Saints (LDS Church). As president, he was considered by adherents of the religion to be a prophet, seer, and revelator. Monson's early career was as a manager at the Deseret News, a Utah newspaper owned by the LDS Church. He spent most of his life engaged in various church leadership positions and public service.

Monson was ordained an LDS apostle at age 36, served in the First Presidency under three church presidents, and was the President of the Quorum of the Twelve Apostles from March 12, 1995, until he became President of the Church on February 3, 2008. He succeeded Gordon B. Hinckley as church president.

Monson received four honorary doctorate degrees, as well as Scouting America's Silver Buffalo and the World Organization of the Scout Movement's Bronze Wolf—the highest awards in each organization. He was a member of the National Executive Board of Scouting America, the organization's governing body.

Monson was chairman of the Boards of Trustees/Education of the Church Educational System, and Ronald Reagan appointed him to the U.S. President's Task Force for Private Sector Initiatives. He married Frances Beverly Johnson in the Salt Lake Temple in 1948, and together they raised their three children. Frances died on May 17, 2013.

== Biography ==
=== Early life ===
Monson was born on August 21, 1927, at St. Mark's Hospital in Salt Lake City, Utah, the son of George Spencer Monson and Gladys Condie Monson. The second of six children, Monson grew up in a "tight-knit" family, with many of his mother's relatives living on the same street and the extended family frequently vacationing together. The family's neighborhood included several residents of Mexican descent, an environment in which Monson said he developed a love for the Mexican people and culture. Monson often spent weekends with relatives on their farms in Granger (now part of West Valley City), and as a teenager, he worked at a printing business his father managed.

From 1940 to 1944, Monson attended West High School in Salt Lake City. In the fall of 1944, he enrolled at the University of Utah. Around this time he met his future wife, Frances, whose family came from a higher social class on the east side of the city. Her father, Franz Johnson, saw an immediate connection because Monson's great uncle, Elias Monson, had baptized him into the LDS Church in Sweden.

=== Early career ===
In 1945, Monson joined the United States Naval Reserve and anticipated participating in World War II in the Pacific theater. He was sent to San Diego, California, for training, but was not stationed overseas before the end of the war. His tour of duty lasted six months beyond the end of the war, then he returned to the University of Utah. Monson graduated in 1948 with a bachelor's degree cum laude in business management. Monson did not serve a mission as a youth. At age 21, on October 7, 1948, he married Frances Beverly Johnson in the Salt Lake Temple. The couple eventually had three children: Thomas Lee, Ann Frances, and Clark Spencer.

After college he rejoined the Naval Reserve with the aim of becoming an officer. Shortly after receiving his commission acceptance letter, his local bishop asked him to serve as a counselor in the bishopric. Time conflicts with bishopric meetings would have made Navy service impossible. After discussion with church apostle Harold B. Lee (his former stake president), Monson declined the commission and applied for a discharge. The Navy granted his discharge in the last group processed before the Korean War. Lee set him apart six months later as a bishop—mentioning in the blessing that he likely would not have been called if he had accepted the commission.

Monson briefly taught at the University of Utah, then began a career in publishing. His first job was with the Deseret News, where he became an advertising executive. He joined the advertising operations at the Newspaper Agency Corporation at its formation in 1952. One year later, Monson transferred to the Deseret News Press, beginning as sales manager and eventually becoming general manager. While at Deseret News Press, Monson worked to publish LeGrand Richards's A Marvelous Work And A Wonder. He also worked with Gordon B. Hinckley, the LDS Church's representative on publications, with whom he would later serve in the First Presidency. In addition to serving as a counselor to President Hinckley, President Monson also served alongside two other church presidents.

=== Local church leadership ===
On May 7, 1950, Monson became an LDS bishop at age 22, serving for five years in two wards. He had previously served as ward clerk, ward Young Men's Mutual Improvement Association superintendent. At the time, Monson's Salt Lake City ward contained over 1,000 people, including 85 widows whom he visited regularly, and he continued visiting these widows after completing his service as bishop. He brought them gifts during the Christmas season, including poultry he had raised himself. Monson eventually spoke at the funerals of each of these women. Also during his time as bishop, 23 men from his ward served in the Korean War. He wrote weekly personal letters to each serviceman. During his service as bishop of the 6th-7th Ward, sacrament meeting attendance in the ward quadrupled.

On June 16, 1955, at age 27, Monson became a counselor to Percy K. Fetzer in the presidency of the Salt Lake Temple View Stake. He was replaced as bishop of the 6th-7th ward the following month. In the stake presidency, Monson oversaw the stake's Primary, Sunday School, MIA, athletics and budget, until he was moved to Holladay, Utah, in June 1957. In Holladay, Monson was assigned to a ward building committee, to coordinate ward members' volunteer service to build a meetinghouse.

=== Mission president in Canada ===
In April 1959, at age 31, Monson became president of the church's Canadian Mission (consisting of Ontario and Quebec), and served until January 1962. Monson's third child, Clark, was born during his mission presidency.

As there were no local stakes in Ontario or Quebec at the time, Monson was responsible for both the missionaries and all LDS Church operations in the area. When he became mission president, he oversaw 130 missionaries and 55 church branches divided into nine districts. During his tenure, the number of missionaries peaked at 180. Historically, most districts and branches in the area had been presided over by full-time missionaries, but Monson placed local members as presidents of branches and districts soon after arriving.

Monson initiated French-speaking proselytizing efforts in Quebec. He directed increased missionary work to immigrants from the Netherlands, Germany, Poland, Italy, Soviet Union and Hungary. Jacob de Jager, a future LDS general authority, was among the immigrant converts. Monson encouraged members to remain in eastern Canada, instead of migrating to Utah or Alberta as many members had done before, to help build the church's presence. To help encourage members to stay in Canada, increase the perception of permanence, and better reach potential converts, he started a major construction program for new meetinghouses. Until then, most branches had used rented halls.

Efforts made during Monson's service came to fruition when a stake was organized in Toronto on August 14, 1960. However, most of the mission's area remained in districts. A more complete presence in Ontario would not come until the dedication of the Toronto Ontario Temple in 1990, which Monson attended as a member of the First Presidency.

=== Return to Utah ===
Immediately after returning from Canada, Monson was called to the high council of the Valley View Stake in Holladay. Two months later he was made area supervisor over nine stake missions (Winder, Wilford, Monument Park, Monument Park West, Hillside, Highland, Parleys, Sugarhouse, and Wasatch). Eight of these stakes were in Salt Lake City or its east-side suburbs, with the Wasatch Stake based in Heber City. He also joined the church's Priesthood Genealogy Committee, and later the Priesthood Home Teaching Committee.

Monson resumed his work with the Deseret News as assistant general manager of the Deseret News Press, mainly doing non-newspaper printing. A month later he was made the general manager of the Deseret News Press. At the time, it was the largest printing plant in the United States west of the Mississippi River. Monson remained in this position until 1963, when he was called as apostle.

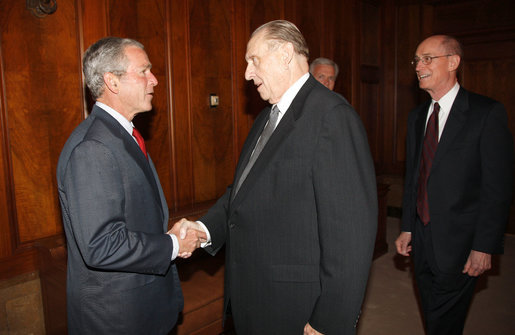
Monson, accompanied by Henry B. Eyring, shakes hands with U.S. President George W. Bush on May 29, 2008, in the Church Administration Building in Salt Lake City, Utah.

=== Apostleship ===
Monson was sustained to the Quorum of the Twelve Apostles at general conference on October 4, 1963. He was the youngest man called to the Quorum of the Twelve in 53 years, and was 17 years younger than the next youngest member, Gordon B. Hinckley. He was ordained and set apart on October 10, 1963, by Joseph Fielding Smith.

From 1965 to 1968, Monson oversaw church operations in the South Pacific and Australia. During this time he organized the first LDS stake in Tonga.

With his business background, he helped oversee many church operations, including KSL Newsradio and Bonneville International. He was chairman of the Scripture Publication Committee in the 1970s that oversaw publication of the LDS Church edition of the King James Bible, and revised editions of church scriptures containing footnotes and guides. He also oversaw the church's Printing Advisory, Missionary Executive, and General Welfare committees. While an apostle, he continued his education and received a master of business administration degree from Brigham Young University in 1974.

Monson later oversaw church operations in Eastern Europe and helped the church gain access in the Soviet bloc. On August 29, 1982, he organized the first stake in East Germany and was instrumental in obtaining permission for the LDS Church to build a temple in Freiberg, East Germany, which was completed in 1985.

=== Other organizations ===
In the mid-1950s Monson was the secretary of the Utah State Roller Club, a group of pigeon breeders. Monson was a member of the National Executive Board of Scouting America (then called the Boy Scouts of America) starting in 1969. From 1969 to 1988 Monson was on the Mountain Bell Board of Advisors. From 1971 to 1977, he served on the Utah State Board of Higher Education and the Utah State Board of Regents. He was a member of the board of directors of Commercial Security Bank, chairing the bank's audit committee for 20 years. In 1993, when the bank was purchased by Key Bank, Monson joined the Board of Directors of Key Bank. In 1981, Ronald Reagan appointed him to the President's Task Force on Private Sector Initiatives, serving until its completion in December 1982.

Monson resigned most of his positions in 1996 when church leadership determined all the general authorities should leave all business boards of directors, except for Deseret Management Corporation. From 1965 until 1996 Monson was a member of the Deseret News Publishing Company board of directors. He became chairman of the board of directors in 1977.

=== First Presidency ===
Following the death of church president Spencer W. Kimball in 1985, newly selected church president Ezra Taft Benson asked Hinckley and Monson to serve as his First and Second Counselors. Monson and Hinckley also served as counselors to Benson's successor, Howard W. Hunter. When Hinckley succeeded Hunter in 1995, Monson became his first counselor. He served until Hinckley's death on January 27, 2008. As the second most senior of the apostles behind Hinckley, Monson simultaneously served as President of the Quorum of the Twelve Apostles; Boyd K. Packer (then third in seniority) served as Acting President during that time.

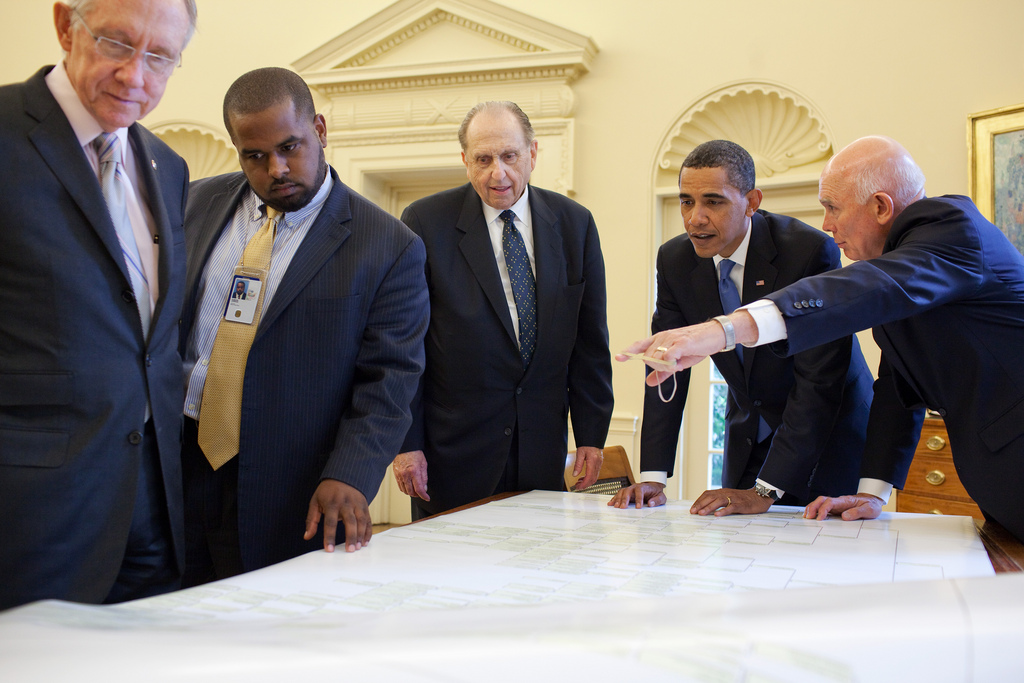
Monson, accompanied by apostle Dallin H. Oaks and Senate Majority Leader Harry Reid, delivers family history records to U.S. President Barack Obama.

=== LDS Church president ===
Monson became the 16th president of the LDS Church on February 3, 2008, succeeding Hinckley, who had died seven days earlier. Monson selected Henry B. Eyring and Dieter F. Uchtdorf as his first and second counselors, respectively. When Monson was born, there were fewer than 650,000 church members in the world, most of them living in the western United States. At the time he became the church's president, there were over 13 million members worldwide, with the majority living outside the United States and Canada. As of October 2012, 31 temples announced by Monson were either under construction or in planning.

Monson and his counselors met with President George W. Bush on May 29, 2008, during Bush's visit to Salt Lake City. He and apostle Dallin H. Oaks met with President Barack Obama and Senator Harry Reid in the Oval Office on July 20, 2009, and presented Obama with five volumes of his personal family history records. Monson did not attend a meeting other church leaders, including Eyring and Uchtdorf, had with Obama during his visit to Utah in April 2015. A church spokesperson indicated the absence was in order to save Monson's strength for the church's general conference the following weekend. As 2015 progressed, Monson gave the closing talk at the funerals of L. Tom Perry, Boyd K. Packer, and Richard G. Scott.

On May 23, 2017, the LDS Church said Monson would no longer be attending meetings at the church's offices on a regular basis, because of limitations incident to age. With his birthday on August 21, 2017, Monson became the seventh president of the LDS Church to be a nonagenarian. Consistent with the May 2017 statement, the LDS Church announced on September 28, 2017, that Monson would not attend the church's upcoming general conference, due to the same health and age-related limitations. He was the first church president to miss an entire general conference weekend since Ezra Taft Benson in 1992. The same reason was given when Monson did not attend the funeral of Robert D. Hales, who died on the Sunday of the church's October general conference.

=== Death ===
Monson died of natural causes at the age of 90 on January 2, 2018, at his home in Salt Lake City. The following day, the LDS Church announced that a public viewing would be held on January 11, in the church's Conference Center, with funeral services scheduled the following day, also in the Conference Center. His death, along with the passing of Hales a couple of months prior, created two vacancies in the Quorum of the Twelve, which were filled at the next general conference. He was succeeded as church president by Russell M. Nelson.

After Monson's death, the obituary posted by The New York Times, which noted several controversies during his presidency, drew negative attention. The Times was criticized for bias against Monson, with one writer citing the obituaries of Fidel Castro and Hugh Hefner in contrast. An online petition asking the Times to remove the obituary gained 188,852 signatures, to which the Times obituaries editor Bill McDonald responded, "I think the obituary was a faithful accounting of the more prominent issues that Mr. Monson encountered and dealt with publicly during his tenure. Some of these matters — the role of women in the church, the church's policy toward homosexuality and same-sex marriage, and more — were widely publicized and discussed, and it's our obligation as journalists, whether in an obituary or elsewhere, to fully air these issues from both sides. I think we did that, accurately portraying Mr. Monson's positions as leader of the church, and those of the faithful and others who questioned church policies."

== Legacy ==
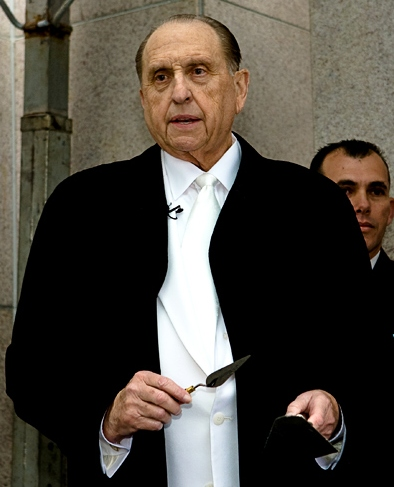
Monson laying the cornerstone during the dedication of the Curitiba Brazil Temple on June 1, 2008

=== Temple dedications ===
As church president, Monson dedicated fourteen (and rededicated four) LDS Church temples: Rexburg Idaho, 2008; Curitiba Brazil, 2008; Panamá City Panamá, 2008; Twin Falls Idaho, 2008; México City México (rededication), 2008; Draper Utah, 2009; Oquirrh Mountain Utah, 2009; Vancouver British Columbia, 2010; Gila Valley Arizona, 2010; Cebu City Philippines, 2010; Kyiv Ukraine, 2010; Laie Hawaii (rededication), 2010; Kansas City Missouri, 2012; Calgary Alberta, 2012; Boise Idaho (rededication), 2012; Gilbert Arizona, 2014; Ogden Utah (rededication), 2014; and Phoenix Arizona, 2014.

As a counselor in the First Presidency, Monson dedicated seven church temples: Buenos Aires Argentina, 1986; Louisville Kentucky, 2000; Reno Nevada, 2000; Tampico México, 2000; Villahermosa México, 2000; Mérida México, 2000; and Veracruz México, 2000. Monson attended the dedication of many other LDS Church temples as a member of the Quorum of the Twelve and the First Presidency.

=== Volunteer work ===
He was president of the Printing Industry of Utah and a former board member of the Printing Industries of America. A Life Scout and Explorer crew member in his youth, Monson served in several adult Scouting leadership capacities: merit badge counselor, member of the Canadian LDS Scouting Committee, chaplain at a Canadian Jamboree, and a member of the General Scouting Committee of the LDS Church. He was also a proponent of the Scouting for Food drive, and he served on the national executive board of the Boy Scouts of America from 1969 to his death. He also represented the Boy Scouts of America as a delegate to the World Conferences in Tokyo, Nairobi, and Copenhagen.

=== Political involvement ===
In June 2008, Monson and his counselors in the First Presidency sent a letter to local congregations in California, urging them to support Proposition 8 by donating their time and resources, stating that, "Our best efforts are required to preserve the sacred institution of marriage." In the 2012 Utah voter list he was listed as a registered Republican voter.

=== Awards and recognition ===
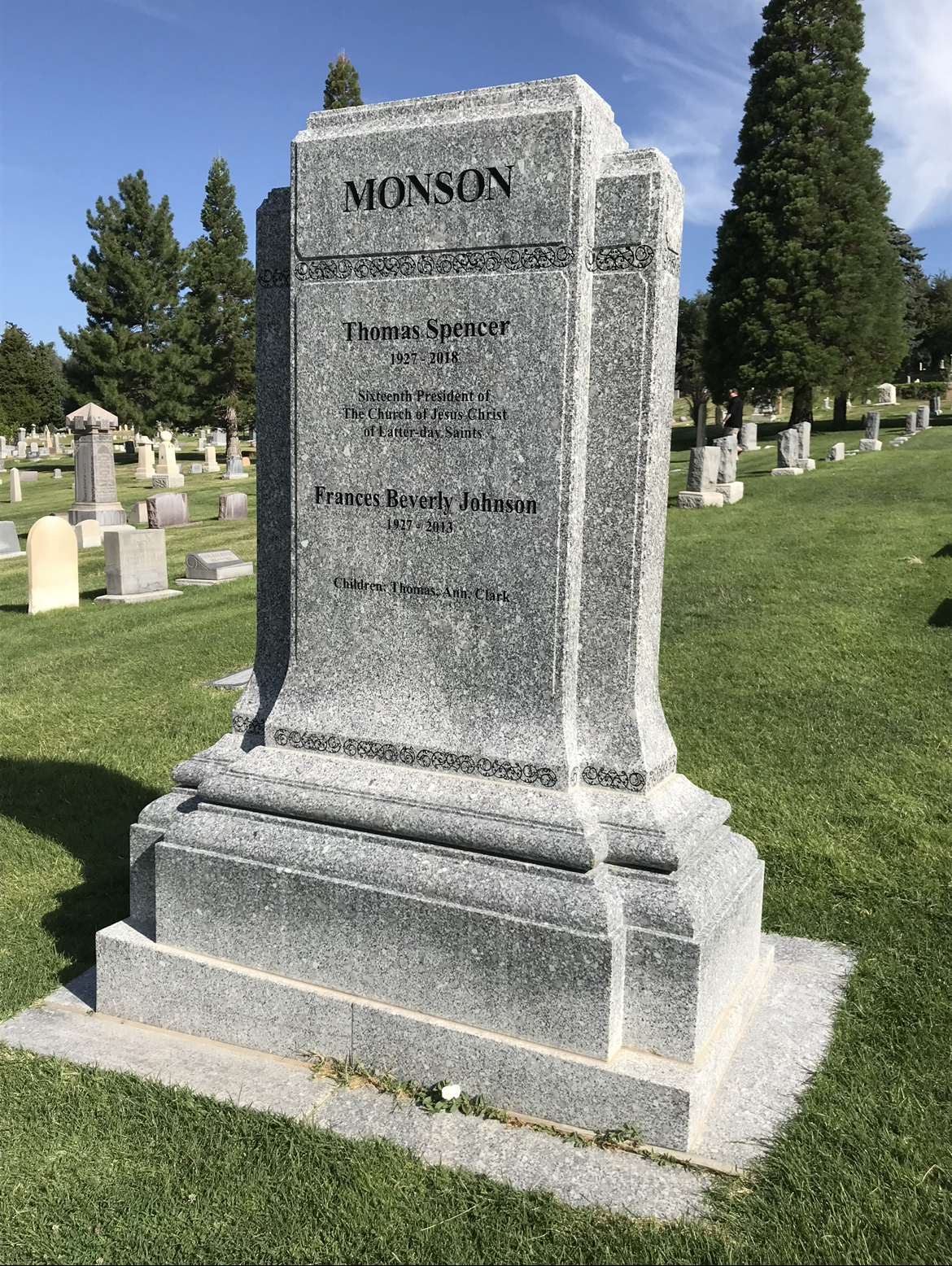
Monson's grave at Salt Lake City Cemetery

In 1966, Monson was honored as a distinguished alumnus by the University of Utah. His first honorary degree, an Honorary Doctorate of Laws, was conferred in April 1981 by Brigham Young University. He received a Doctor of Humane Letters from Salt Lake Community College in June 1996, an Honorary Doctor of Business from the University of Utah in May 2007, and an honorary doctorate degree in Humanities from Dixie State College in May 2011.

Monson received the Boy Scouts of America's Silver Beaver award in 1971 and Silver Buffalo award in 1978, the latter being the highest honor of the BSA. In October 1993, during the Priesthood Session of the church's general conference, Monson also received the Bronze Wolf, the highest honor and only award of the World Organization of the Scout Movement, and was recognized for his contributions when a leadership complex at the Summit Bechtel Reserve was named for him. The citation for this award says:

In his assignments throughout the world as a leader of [the LDS Church], President Monson worked tirelessly to bring about the advancement of Scouting in many countries. He worked closely with the World Organization of the Scout Movement to find ways to strengthen the links between the Church and national Scout associations. He was a committed, solid, hard-working volunteer in the Scout Movement. His Scouting leadership was exemplary.

In connection with the LDS Church's centennial celebration as a chartered sponsor, the BSA announced that the Leadership Excellence Complex, located at The Summit Bechtel Family National Scout Reserve in West Virginia, would be renamed the Thomas S. Monson Leadership Excellence Complex and also awarded him Scouting's Honor Medal in 2013 for saving the life of a girl who was drowning when he was 12 years old. The Salt Lake chapter of Rotary International honored Monson at its international convention with its Worldwide Humanitarian Award in 2008.

In Slate.com's "80 Over 80," a list of the most powerful octogenarians, Monson placed first in 2009, and first again in 2010. In 2011, Gallup listed Monson as one of "Americans' 10 Most Admired Men".

=== In popular culture ===
Monson was mentioned by name in the 2011 Broadway musical, The Book of Mormon. In the song "I Believe," the character Elder Price states that he believes that as president of the church, Monson has the ability to speak directly to God. His name can still be heard on the cast recording.

Monson was portrayed by Russell Dixon in the 2019 film The Other Side of Heaven 2: Fire of Faith.

== Publications ==
Monson wrote a number of books, some of which are compilations of speeches given by him, or of quotes. Others discuss particular LDS gospel themes. He also wrote Faith Rewarded which is an autobiographical account about his work in leading the church in Eastern Europe.

- Monson, Thomas S. (1973), Pathways to Perfection, Salt Lake City, Utah: Deseret Book, ISBN 978-0-87747-511-8
- —— (1977), In Search of the Christmas Spirit, Salt Lake City, Utah: Deseret Book, ISBN 978-0-87747-684-9
- —— (1979), Be Your Best Self, Salt Lake City, Utah: Deseret Book, ISBN 978-0-87747-787-7
- —— (1981), Conference Classics, Salt Lake City, Utah: Deseret Book, ASIN B00K33B31E
- —— (1983), Conference Classics Volume II, Salt Lake City, Utah: Deseret Book, ASIN B003HFIJ80
- —— (1983), Christmas Gifts, Christmas Blessings, Salt Lake City, Utah: Deseret Book, ISBN 978-0-87747-976-5
- —— (1984), Conference Classics Volume III, Salt Lake City, Utah: Deseret Book, ASIN B002LTY4TQ
- —— (1985), Favorite Quotations from the Collection of Thomas S. Monson, Salt Lake City, Utah: Deseret Book, ISBN 978-0-87747-749-5
- —— (1985), On the Lord's Errand: Memoirs of Thomas S. Monson, Salt Lake City, Utah: Deseret Book, ASIN B000IC07DK
- —— (1988), Live the Good Life, Salt Lake City, Utah: Deseret Book, ISBN 978-0-87579-192-0
- —— (1992), The Search for Jesus, Salt Lake City, Utah: Deseret Book, ISBN 978-0-87579-669-7
- —— (1994), Inspiring Experiences That Build Faith: From the Life and Ministry of Thomas S. Monson, Salt Lake City, Utah: Deseret Book, ISBN 978-0-87579-901-8
- —— (1996), Faith Rewarded: A Personal Account of Prophetic Promises to the East German Saints, Salt Lake City, Utah: Deseret Book, ISBN 978-1-57345-186-4
- —— (1997), Invitation to Exaltation, Salt Lake City, Utah: Deseret Book, ISBN 978-1-57345-358-5
- —— (1997), Meeting your Goliath, Salt Lake City, Utah: Deseret Book, ISBN 978-1-57345-357-8
- —— (2004), A Christmas Dress for Ellen, Salt Lake City, Utah: Deseret Book, ISBN 978-1-59038-386-5
- —— (2011), Teachings of Thomas S. Monson, Salt Lake City, Utah: Deseret Book, ISBN 978-1-60908-890-3
- —— (2012), A Prophet's Voice: Messages from Thomas S. Monson, Salt Lake City, Utah: Deseret Book, ISBN 978-1-60907-218-6
- —— (2013), Consider the Blessings: True Accounts of God's Hand in Our Lives, Salt Lake City, Utah: Deseret Book, ISBN 978-1-60907-716-7

== Sources ==
- Chase, Randal S. (2013). Church History Study Guide, Pt. 3: Latter-Day Prophets Since 1844. Making Precious Things Plain. Vol. 6 (Revised ed.). Plain & Precious Publishing. ISBN 978-1-937-90106-6.
- Swinton, Heidi S. (2010), To the Rescue: The Biography of Thomas S. Monson, Salt Lake City, Utah: Deseret Book, ISBN 978-1-60641-898-7

The Church of Jesus Christ of Latter-day Saints titles
Preceded by Gordon B. Hinckley	President of the Church; February 3, 2008 – January 2, 2018	Succeeded by Russell M. Nelson
Preceded by Gordon B. Hinckley	President of the Quorum of the Twelve Apostles; March 12, 1995 – February 3, 2008; With: Boyd K. Packer (Acting)	Succeeded by Boyd K. Packer
Preceded by Gordon B. Hinckley	First Counselor in the First Presidency; March 12, 1995 – January 27, 2008	Succeeded by Henry B. Eyring
Preceded by Gordon B. Hinckley	Second Counselor in the First Presidency; November 10, 1985 – March 3, 1995	Succeeded by James E. Faust
Preceded by N. Eldon Tanner	Quorum of the Twelve Apostles; October 4, 1963 – February 3, 2008	Succeeded by Boyd K. Packer
