= Temple president =

LDS Church leadership position

Temple president is a priesthood leadership position in the Church of Jesus Christ of Latter-day Saints. A temple president's primary responsibility is to supervise the affairs of a church temple in both an administrative and spiritual capacity.

The president is assisted by two male counselors and together they compose the temple presidency. Normally the wife of the temple president serves as the temple matron, and the wives of the president's counselors as assistants to the matron. The matron and her assistants share in the responsibilities of the temple presidency. All members of a temple presidency are ordained high priests in the church.

== Duties and responsibilities ==
For Latter-day Saints, temples are considered literal houses of God the Father and Jesus Christ, a sacred space where mortals may commune directly with heaven. As such the greatest responsibilities of the temple president are associated with the church's teachings of expanding divine contact within the temple. They include setting apart ordinance and service workers by the laying-on of hands; submitting recommendations to the First Presidency for counselors in the temple presidency and for additional sealers; performing ordinances; instructing first time patrons and youth groups on the sacred nature of temple work; privately answering various doctrinal and personal questions presented by temple patrons and workers; ensuring that the reverence and harmony required for temple worship is constantly maintained; and seeking inspiration and divine guidance on every aspect of his duties.

The administrative responsibilities of a temple president include ensuring all ordinances are performed by proper authority and documented correctly; securing a sufficient number of ordinance and service workers to meet the needs of temple patrons; overseeing the instruction of patrons, ordinance, and service workers; maintaining relationships with local church leaders; overseeing budgetary matters, property, and temple maintenance; and in larger temples the operation of cafeterias.

Temple presidents and matrons, or their representatives, often attend stake conferences within the temple district. They sit on the stand and are often invited by the presiding authority to speak to the congregation. In these and other speaking assignments the topic is typically devoted to matters central to temple worship and devotion to deity.

== Temple matrons ==
In modern practice, the church calls a husband and wife to serve together as temple president and matron. Because women as well as men serve as ordinance workers, and certain ordinances such as washing and anointing are conducted separately (with an officiator the same sex as the participant), the temple matron leads and directs the activities of the women who work in the temple.

Elizabeth Yates Stoddard, matron of the Logan Utah Temple

During the early period after the first temples were built in Utah, matrons were selected separately from temple presidents and not necessarily connected with them. The title was simply used for a woman who presided over the other female workers in a fashion similar to how the temple president would preside over the temple as a whole. For example, in 1914 William Budge, president of the Logan Utah Temple (one of whose wives was then still living), called a widow, Elizabeth Yates Stoddard, who was already serving as an officiator, to be the matron for that temple.

== Selection of temple presidencies ==
Temple presidents and matrons, the president's counselors, and the matron's assistants are appointed by the First Presidency. Their background in church leadership varies, yet they are couples who are considered by church leaders as spiritually mature and capable of handling both the administrative and spiritual matters necessary for the successful operation of a temple.

During a training seminar for new temple presidents, held in the Salt Lake Temple, Thomas S. Monson said:

"We looked over the entire Church. ... We looked for men of God, wherever they might be. We found willingness to serve – not putting yourselves forward to volunteer, but being willing to serve. What a sweet experience this has been."

They may be selected from a geographical area near the temple or from another area. In larger temples, the president and matron usually serve for a period of three consecutive years. In smaller temples, they "have an indefinite period of appointment". Most temple presidencies serving in smaller temples are selected from church membership living within the temple district.
