= Christian fellowships of "the Remnants" movement =

American non-denominational Mormon-derived Christian movement (2013-)

Covenant Christians, Remnant movement fellowships
- Abbreviation: Fotr
- Type: Latter Day Saint movement
- Classification: Neo-LDS fundamentalist (in schism with LDS Church); Neo-Reorganized Latter Day Saint (rejects Brigham Young's apostolic succession)
- Orientation: Supra-denominational Christian and Restorationist
- Scripture: • Old Covenants (drawn from Joseph Smith’s New Translation of the Holy Bible) • New Covenants (drawn from Joseph Smith’s New Translation of the Holy Bible & Book of Mormon) • Teachings and Commandments (original revelations to Joseph Smith, Lectures on Faith, several of Smith's letters, expanded Joseph Smith History, & modern material approved by movement's common consent) • "The Covenant of Christ" (a modern English version of the Book of Mormon published and accepted as scripture in 2024)
- Theology: Nontrinitarian Latter Day Saint movement as found in Joseph Smith's original teachings and revelations through Denver Snuffer Jr.
- Governance: By common consent ("And all things shall be done by common consent in the church, by much prayer and faith, for all things you shall receive by faith. Amen."—D&C 26:2)
- Structure: Charismatic propeht-leader, house churches ("fellowships"), ad hoc committees, women's priesthood councils.
- Moderator: De facto: Denver Snuffer Jr.
- Region: Worldwide, with a concentration in the Mormon corridor.
- Headquarters: Unknown
- Founder: Spontaneous, post-LDS Gospel dispensation (De facto: Denver Snuffer Jr.)
- Origin: 2013 (unofficially) 2017 (officially)
- Separated from: The Church of Jesus Christ of Latter-day Saints
- Number of followers: 5,000-10,000 as of September, 2017
- Other names: • Covenant Christians • Fellowships movement • Covenant of Christ movement • Restoration movement • "Snufferites" (Participants may reject this term.)
- Official website: Covenant Christians; Born of Water; ChristianReformation500Years.info; RecordersClearinghouse.com: Recorder's message Scriptures.info
- Not to be confused with fellow Latter Day Saints religious group Remnant Church of Jesus Christ of Latter Day Saints, founded in 2000 in Independence, Missouri or with the Latter Day Saint religious unity movement, the Church of Jesus Christ in Christian Fellowship, or with Protestant congregation Remnant Fellowship of Brentwood, Tennessee, founded in 1999 by Gwen Shamblin

"And again the Lord called others, and said unto them likewise; and he gave unto them power to baptize. And he said unto them: On this wise shall ye baptize; and there shall be no disputations among you."

———

"And whoso shall declare more or less than this, and establish it for my doctrine, the same cometh of evil, and is not built upon my rock; but he buildeth upon a sandy foundation, and the gates of hell stand open to receive such when the floods come and the winds beat upon them."
—3 Nephi 11:22 & 40

"I will establish my church among them, and they shall come in unto the covenant and be numbered among this the remnant of Jacob[...]and also as many of the house of Israel as shall come, that they may build[...]the New Jerusalem."—3 Nephi 21:22, 23

"Joseph told us to expect great events among the gentiles, Native Americans and remnant of Jewish people before Christ’s victorious return. He did not live to see this happen. Upon his death, he left a great deal for others to complete. Assuming the work Joseph began is to be finished, it will not happen by heaven laboring independent of us. We have work to do." — Denver Snuffer, 2018

Covenant Christians, also known as Remnant movement fellowships, are a loosely organized branch of the Latter Day Saint movement formed by individuals who accept alleged divine revelations received by Denver Snuffer Jr., an attorney excommunicated from The Church of Jesus Christ of Latter-day Saints (LDS Church) in 2013. Despite claiming he is not a chosen prophet of God, Denver Snuffer acts as an intermediary, effectively serving as the movement’s primary provider of revelation. Participants in the movement generally feel called to personal and social renewal in preparation for Christ's eventual second coming. According to movement beliefs, participants anticipate a coming time when remnants remain within the fully restored covenant with Jesus Christ, an allusion to a belief that "The Bible, Book of Mormon, and modern revelation through the Prophet Joseph Smith, prophesy that the gospel of Jesus Christ would shift from the Gentile stewards of the gospel back to Israel in the last days." The movement places a renewed focus on individual communion with God, gifts of the spirit, tangible expressions of faith, and the eventual establishment of Zion.

Participants are Mormon dissidents and supra-denominational Christians. Its individual fellowships are autonomous and lack affiliation with or oversight from the LDS Church.

== Origins ==
Snuffer released a series of books and online articles explaining his beliefs and interpretations of scripture. He had said his writings were intended to promote loyalty to the LDS Church and that he would not be instrumental in starting a new religion. Snuffer's writings provoked a response from LDS Church leaders who eventually excommunicated him for what they described as directly challenging key doctrines. In 2014, Snuffer said he received a revelation informing him that "the Lord terminated the priesthood authority" of LDS Church leadership involved in his excommunication, such as the First Presidency. Starting in 2013, inspired by Snuffer's teachings, grass-roots fellowships began to form. On February 17–19, 2017, a proposed set of governing principles was presented to these fellowships by Jeff Savage. As of 2017, the movement included approximately 5,000 adherents worldwide. As of 2024, at least fifty fellowships are affiliated with the movement, spanning throughout the United States, United Kingdom, Europe, Africa, and Japan.

Adherents began gathering in conferences beginning in 2016. At the 2017 conference, Snuffer-inspired teachings were canonized as holy scripture. This canon consists of a reworking of scripture from the mainstream LDS Church, such as the Book of Mormon, as well as Snuffer's expanded translation of the Book of John and several of Snuffer's revelations. The movement de-emphasizes hierarchy and organization, with some fellowships (for example, the movement's Minnesota fellowship) asserting they possess no leadership. At the October 2024 conference, adherents voted to accept a modern English version of the Book of Mormon, titled The Covenant of Christ, as scripture.

The fellowships draw largely from members and former members of the LDS Church, leading LDS Church authorities to identify Snuffer and his teachings as a vehicle for leading people out of that church. In 2017, the website MormonLeaks published a PowerPoint presentation shown in 2015 to the LDS Quorum of the Twelve Apostles, in which Snuffer was identified as one of 17 "Issues and Ideas Leading People Away" from mainstream LDS doctrine.

== Conferences ==
The general conferences organized by movement fellowships are listed below. Policy changes and issues are put up to vote at these conferences, similar to ancient creeds such as the Nicene Creed.

- Doctrine of Christ Conference, Boise, Idaho, September 9–11, 2016
- Doctrine of Christ Conference, St. George, Utah, March 18–20, 2017
- Covenant of Christ Conference, Boise, Idaho, September 2–3, 2017 (This conference voted on the canonization of scripture, and discussed the building of a temple. Some followers of the movement refer to themselves as the Remnant.)
- Wisdom through the Ages Conference, Phoenix, Arizona, March 24–25, 2018
- Preserving the Hope of Zion Conference, Layton, Utah, September 29–30, 2018
- A Hope in Christ: The Temple Conference, Grand Junction, Colorado, April 20–21, 2019
- Keeping the Covenant Conference, Boise, Idaho, September 20–22, 2019
- The Heavens Are Open Conference, Hurricane, Utah, March 20–22, 2020
- The Religion of the Fathers Conference, Aravada Springs, Nevada, March 26–29, 2021
- Hear and Trust the Lord in the Storm, Lexington, Kentucky, March 25–27, 2022
- Stand Independent, Syracuse, Utah, September 23–25, 2022
- The Answer to Prayer for Covenant, Layton, Utah, May 20–21, 2023
- The Heavens Speak, New York, April 6–8, 2024
- Top of the Mountains, Stanley, Idaho, June 27–30, 2024
- Obtain a New Heart, Orderville, Utah, October 25–27, 2024
- Peace in Christ Conference, Provo, Utah, April 12, 2025
- The Sermon at the Temple, Provo, Utah, April 13, 2025

== Beliefs and practices ==
According to Snuffer's interpretation of the scriptures, the present Gospel dispensation, as restored through Joseph Smith, has ended, and a new Gospel dispensation has begun. Adherents believe all splinter groups that formed following the death of Smith had the opportunity to re-enter the covenant with God, but they all failed to do so and instead entered a state of final apostasy, with the Reorganized Church of Jesus Christ of Latter Day Saints (RLDS Church), now known as the Community of Christ (CoC), and LDS Church being the last two to do so.

As foretold in scriptures, remnants, especially the indigenous peoples of the Americas, will adopt Christ's covenant in these Last Days. (The indigenous remnants are likely mixed-blooded; in LDS belief, such individuals are considered among the House of Israel). The present period is a time of the Lord calling out those to transition between the dispensation that resulted in the establishment of the Church of Christ through Smith and this next, foretold dispensation of Israel.

With regard to the 1844 succession crisis within Mormonism after the murder of Smith, the Snuffer movement holds beliefs similar to those formerly maintained by the CoC, namely that Brigham Young, who ultimately took leadership of the largest portion of Smith's followers, was in apostasy from Smith's teachings. The movement rejects Young's assertions to have possessed authority to fill the position held by Smith. The movement agrees with the current teachings of the LDS Church in rejecting Young's theological innovations such as his attempt to formulate his Adam God theory. The movement goes further and rejects any doctrinal innovations by Young.

The group preaches heterosexual monogamy, although it does not advocate for the break-up of polygamous families. Most in the movement agree with the CoC's formerly maintained belief that Smith did not practice plural marriage, believing instead that Young promulgated this innovation.

Unlike either the LDS Church or CoC, movement believers hold that spiritual authority to perform certain gospel ordinances as restored through Smith passed from the earth at Smith's death but will be restored upon the building of a new temple.

The fellowships believe Smith taught that the Last Days covenant people should forswear allegiance to any institution but to enact the same to each individual's own covenants and to Smith's open canon of scripture. (Compare these beliefs with some of the aspects of Sola Scriptura, a doctrinal foundation of Protestantism. In this respect, movement beliefs perhaps occupy some ground between the institutional authoritarianism of the LDS Church and individual conscience-privileging Nonconformist Protestantism.)

"I believe that the many revelations in the D&C identifying Joseph as the spokesman for God means exactly that: Joseph was and IS the spokesman God sent. Joseph's words need to be heeded as if they came from God directly to us. No one has the right to change or ignore them. No one (and I mean NO ONE) has the right to claim they are Joseph's equal. There are no "keys" or "key holders" who can alter Joseph's teachings except at their peril. When they ignore or contradict Joseph's revelations, and teach others that they can ignore the message and warnings given by that prophet who was called by God to begin this dispensation, they damn themselves and any who listen to them."—Denver Snuffer, September 25, 2013

The movement is supra-denominational. It teaches belief in Christ, initial baptism or re-baptism by authorized movement brethren in living water (i.e., running water), receiving of the Holy Ghost, and acceptance of the movement's scriptural canon as prerequisites for participation. Beyond these basics, the beliefs among participants vary.

Movement adherents believe in the doctrine taught by Smith in 1839 of the Second Comforter.

"After a person has faith in Christ, repents of his sins, and is baptized for the remission of his sins and receives the Holy Ghost (by the laying on of hands), which is the first Comforter, then let him continue to humble himself before God, hungering and thirsting after righteousness, and living by every word of God, and the Lord will soon say unto him, Son, thou shalt be exalted. When the Lord has thoroughly proved him, and finds that the man is determined to serve Him at all hazards, then the man will find his calling and his election made sure, then it will be his privilege to receive the other Comforter, which the Lord hath promised the Saints, as is recorded in the testimony of St. John, in the 14th chapter, from the 12th to the 27th verses….

"Now what is this other Comforter? It is no more nor less than the Lord Jesus Christ Himself; …when any man obtains this last Comforter, he will have the personage of Jesus Christ to attend him, or appear unto him from time to time, and even He will manifest the Father unto him, and they will take up their abode with him, and the visions of the heavens will be opened unto him, and the Lord will teach him face to face, and he may have a perfect knowledge of the mysteries of the Kingdom of God; and this is the state and place the ancient Saints arrived at when they had such glorious visions-Isaiah, Ezekiel, John upon the Isle of Patmos, St. Paul in the three heavens, and all the Saints who held communion with the general assembly and Church of the First Born [TPJS, pp. 150-51].

"The Lord has counseled his Saints to "seek his face" (D&C 101:37-38). No sinful person can endure his presence, and hence will not obtain the blessing (D&C 67:10-13; JST Ex. 33:11, 20). In God's wisdom, some faithful individuals are blessed with the Second Comforter while remaining in mortality."

[See also Calling and Election; Jesus Christ: Latter-Day Appearances of Jesus Christ.]

— Daniel H. Ludlow (1992). "Jesus Christ, Second Comforter". Encyclopedia of Mormonism. New York: Macmillan. p. 742.

Fellowships include participants who are current or former members of the LDS Church, CoC (or other groups within the "Reorganized" tradition founded by Smith's son, Joseph Smith III), fundamentalist Mormon denominations, Catholic Church, and Protestant denominations. Fellowship participants need not leave their former faith tradition, whether this be Christian or another faith.

Fellowships meet in homes or outdoors. The requirement for baptism in living waters entails meetings along streams. According to some in the movement, the divine command through Smith to build the temple in Nauvoo, Illinois for "endowment" rites has not been fulfilled. Movement believers are consecrating funds toward building a temple of Zion, which they believe the Lord eventually will command for a Zion people to build.

Like the LDS Church, the movement believes there is a Heavenly Father and a Heavenly Mother, and Snuffer has stated that he believes the Heavenly Mother came to Earth in the form of Mary to birth Jesus of Nazareth.

Some participants in the movement keep the annual Passover in preparation for the temple practice.

A subset of the Remnant’s followers have been publicly associated with or have expressed support for far-right political ideologies. Among them is former U.S. Space Force officer and current undersecretary for the U.S. Air Force Matt Lohmeier, whose public statements and activism have been described by media outlets as aligned with far-right political narratives. Lohmeier was relieved of command after claiming anti-american policy in military in 2021.

In early 2026, the movement sustained Keith Henderson as Patriarch to the Covenant Christian movement.

== Scriptures ==
The movement draws on a variety of scriptural sources but primarily relies on the Restoration Edition scriptures, a collection produced specifically for its denominations. These editions include original translations to which Denver Snuffer contributed, as well as alterations to the organization and interpretive definitions of certain passages. The qualifications of the translators and the legitimacy of these modifications remain matters of dispute.

- The Old Covenants: Restoration Edition. Restoration Scriptures. Vol. 1. Restoration Scriptures Foundation. 2018. ISBN 978-0999341711.

(Joseph Smith's New Translation of the Old Testament)

- The New Covenants: Restoration Edition. Restoration Scriptures. Vol. 2. Restoration Scriptures Foundation. 2017. ISBN 978-0999341728.

(Joseph Smith's New Translation of the New Testament & Joseph Smith's self-revised version of the Book of Mormon)

- Teachings and Commandments: Restoration Edition. Restoration Scriptures. Vol. 3. Restoration Scriptures Foundation. 2018. ISBN 978-0999341735.
- The Covenant of Christ: A Modern English Translation of the Book of Mormon. 2024.

Teachings and Commandments include —
- Proverbs of Joseph Smith
- Proverbs of Denver Snuffer Jr.
- "D. & C." sections by Joseph Smith
- a new version of D&C 54
- exclusion of Kirtland Temple visitation by angels in D&C 110 and portions based on fragmentary teachings by Joseph Smith in D&C 129
- letter from Hyrum Smith as section 97,
- Lectures on Faith
- the Wentworth Letter
- "a newly revealed account of John the Beloved’s Testimony of Jesus the Messiah"
- revelations given to Denver Snuffer Jr.
- the movement's "Guide and Standard"
- The Book of Abraham
- A History of Joseph Smith jnr

== Reactions ==
In 2013, a critical review by Gregory L. Smith of Snuffer's Passing the Heavenly Gift was published in Interpreter: A Journal of Mormon Scripture. Smith responds to Snuffer's belief that "the Latter-day Saint church was predicted to fail, and in all likelihood has failed to secure the fullness of the priesthood" by Smith's contention that the book contains various "false statements and conclusions, contains errors, and makes mistakes in history."

In 2013, Snuffer was informed by his Sandy Utah Crescent Stake president in a letter that the thesis of Passing the Heavenly Gift, soon to be published, was "in direct conflict with LDS Church doctrine" and unless Snuffer would withdraw it from publication he could be subject to church discipline for "apostasy." After the book's publication, Snuffer was excommunicated from the LDS Church.

In 2015, "A Response to Denver Snuffer’s Essay on Plural Marriage, Adoption, and the Supposed Falling Away of the Church," by Brian C. Hales was published in Interpreter. Hales says that Snuffer's status as revelator is not unique, citing such Latter Day Saint movement revelators over the years as Lorin C. Woolley, John T. Clark, Maurice Glendening, Leroy Wilson, Joseph W. Musser, Elden Kingston, Ben LeBaron, Gerald Peterson, James D. Harmston, Brian David Mitchell, Robert C. Crossfield, and Addam Swapp, who, akin to Snuffer, believe the mainstream LDS Church is in apostasy.

A June 2015 three-stake fireside (which some colloquially term the "Boise (Idaho) Rescue") featured LDS devotional addresses by LDS Church Apostle Dallin H. Oaks and Church Historian Richard E. Turley Jr. "We sometimes hear is that the church is no longer the church that was restored to the earth by the prophet Joseph," Turley said. "Here’s another claim: the church is focused on following the brethren instead of seeking Christ," said Oaks. "When you start toward apostasy, you are on the wrong side. [...] Stand fast with the leadership of the church." Snuffer said to KUTV news that soon before the fireside event, Remnant movement re-baptisms of LDS Church members had been performed in the area.

An internal 2015 PowerPoint chart prepared for LDS Church Apostles (and later provided to news outlets by the MormonLeaks organization) lists Snuffer, the Ordain Women advocacy movement, and new media journalist social commentator John Dehlin among entities leading some LDS Church members away from fellowship with the denomination.

According to religion reporter Peggy Fletcher Stack, when LDS Church Apostle M. Russell Ballard spoke at the LDS Church's October 2017 General Conference, warning LDS Church faithful not to be deceived by non-LDS Church priesthood holders or "organizations, groups or individuals [...claiming] secret answers to doctrinal questions", his characterizations fit "the nascent Remnant movement".

== See also ==
- Denver Snuffer Jr.
- Mormon corridor
- Christianity in the United States
- Non-denominational Christianity
- Emerging church
- House church
- Nontrinitarianism
- Restorationism
- Mormonism
- List of denominations in the Latter Day Saint movement
- List of churches in the Latter Day Saint Reorganization movement
- Continuing revelation
- Gifts of the Spirit in Mormonism
- Immersion baptism
- Baptism in Mormonism
- Sacrament (LDS Church)
- Sacrament (Community of Christ)
- Priesthood (Latter Day Saints)
- American Redoubt
- Leaderless resistance
