= Second Coming in Mormonism =

Theological disposition

Members of the Church of Jesus Christ of Latter-day Saints (LDS Church) and faithful adherents to the Latter Day Saint movement, believe that there will be a Second Coming of Jesus Christ to the earth sometime in the future. The LDS Church and its leaders do not make predictions of the actual date of the Second Coming.

According to LDS Church teachings, the restored gospel will be taught in all parts of the world prior to the Second Coming. The members of the church believe that the scriptures prophecy that there will be wars, rumors of wars, earthquakes, hurricanes, and other man-made and natural disasters prior to the Second Coming.

== Purpose ==
The LDS Church teaches that God loves all people, both those who are present on the earth, as well as those who have been on the earth previously. The LDS Church's theology states that all people will be resurrected because of the atonement of Christ; however, in order to gain exaltation, there are certain ordinances which must be performed while on the earth, including baptism, confirmation, temple endowment, and celestial marriage. The Church believes that God will provide a way for those who have not received the required ordinances to have the work done for them. Human beings will not miss the chance to get into heaven due to failing to learn about or embrace Latter-day Saint teachings while alive. Through temple work done by living proxies and through missionary work taking place in the spirit world, all people will have the opportunity to accept these ordinances, even if not until after they have died.

It is believed that those who have died who have not received these ordinances, or do not know or understand about Jesus Christ, will be taught in the afterlife. This work is done similar to the way missionary work is done in life. It is believed that in the afterlife, individuals retain their beliefs, knowledge and agency, and Latter-day Saints believe they will still be able to choose for themselves what they desire. Having the work done for them does nothing unless they desire it. It will not change their religion, beliefs, or feelings, unless they themselves decide to accept the work done for them.

Latter-day Saints currently perform this work by researching genealogical records for the names of deceased persons in their families, performing ordinances such as baptism and marriage with living proxies in temple ceremonies. Latter-day Saints believe that those who have died who have also received these ordinances act as missionaries to the unconverted who have passed on in an effort to persuade them to accept the work done on their behalf and accept the parts of the gospel that they did not learn or accept in life. Latter-day Saints believe that this work will continue after the Second Coming, during a period Latter-day Saints refer to as the Millennium. The LDS Church teaches that Jesus Christ will return to the earth to prepare for ordinance and conversion work to be done for all people who have ever lived, as well as to prepare the Earth itself for the completion of its mission as a testing ground for human souls.

== Timing ==
According to the Doctrine and Covenants, which is considered scriptural canon in the LDS Church, "[the Son of Man] now reigneth in the heavens and will reign till he descends on the earth … which time is nigh at hand … but the hour and the day no man knoweth, neither the angels in heaven, nor shall they know until he comes."

The LDS Church teaches that no person will be given the knowledge of when the Second Coming is to occur. There are no current official teachings speculating about an exact time or date; while such speculations were not unusual among high-ranking LDS leadership in the early church, they have been discouraged since the early 1900s. Although the exact time and date is not known, Latter-day Saints believe that specific events must take place as signs before the Second Coming can occur.

== Events ==
The LDS Church teaches that Jesus will come in "power and great glory." Latter-day Saints believe that the person who will arrive is the same Jesus as the one who ascended to heaven in the New Testament account and that he will still have the marks of the nails in his hands and feet that he gained from the Crucifixion when he returns.

=== Signs ===
The LDS Church teaches that the entire Earth will be aware of the arrival of Jesus, including non-believers.

Events that are specified in LDS Church teachings to occur at the Second Coming include:

- There will appear a great sign in heaven, and all the people shall see it.
- The righteous that are upon the earth will be caught up to meet him.
- Angels will announce his return, which all the inhabitants of the earth will hear, and every knee shall bow.

=== Actions of Christ ===
The LDS Church is fairly specific about the events that will occur at the Second Coming.

- Christ will complete the First Resurrection. This event involves Jesus resurrecting some of mankind. The Church believes that the spirit world is a place where the souls of the dead reside prior to the Second Coming and Final Judgment but that this is not the soul's final resting place. They believe that all the people of the earth will be resurrected and receive their physical body again, however, depending on their righteousness, this resurrection may occur at a different time for some. They believe that after being judged, the souls of man will be placed in one of three separate kingdoms. Those who will obtain the highest kingdom will be resurrected first, followed by those who will obtain the second kingdom. This completes the First Resurrection. Those who obtain the lowest or no kingdom remain in spirit prison until the completion of the millennium.
- He will judge the nations and divide the righteous from the wicked.
- The wicked will be removed from the earth. All things that are corrupt will be burned, and the earth will be cleansed with fire. Those who are good people, regardless of faith or beliefs, will remain.
- The Jewish people who are living at the time will be able to see, touch and feel the nail marks in his hands and feet, and will mourn because they, as a people, had rejected Jesus as the Messiah.
- Jesus will directly rule as King of heaven and earth. He will establish a theocratic government and will usher in the new Millennium.

== The Millennium ==
According to LDS Church doctrine, the Millennium is believed to be a period of peace and righteousness. During this time, Jesus will personally reign on the earth, and Satan will be bound and have no power over the people due to their righteousness.

Latter-day Saints teach that during the first part of the Millennium, many LDS Church missionaries will be needed throughout the world to teach those on the Earth. However, as time progresses, missionary work will decrease as the knowledge that Jesus is the Christ and knowledge about the gospel spreads.

During the Millennium, the majority of the work and ordinances necessary for salvation for those who have died will be completed. The LDS Church teaches that individuals retain free will whether or not they chose to perform the ordinances themselves or if the ordinances were performed by proxy. Doctrinally, deceased individuals must voluntarily accept the ordinances and become converted to the teachings of Jesus Christ for them to come into effect. Latter-day Saints believe that the human family tree all the way to Adam will have its temple ordinances completed. This work will be made possible through the help of those who have been resurrected at or before the Second Coming of Christ.

Latter-day Saints believe that organizations and families will continue through the Millennium similar as they are now.

Close to the end of the Millennium, it is believed that Satan will be loosed for a short period of time. At this point, the Archangel Michael, who the Church teaches is the same person as Adam, will lead the righteous in a final battle against Satan and his followers. LDS Church teachings state that Satan and his followers will be cast into a place referred to as outer darkness. Because Satan and his followers had once lived in the presence of God, they have an undeniable knowledge of God, Jesus Christ, and their plan for humanity. Their rebellion is treated as the only unforgivable sin in our belief: knowing rebellion against God's plan and attempting to deceive the people who inhabit the earth. The only people that lived on the Earth that will be cast out with Satan are those who have gained a similarly complete, undeniable understanding of God and his plan, and then denied or falsified this truth. These are known as the Sons of Perdition.

It is believed at the close of the Millennium, with all the work complete, the final judgment of the souls of human beings will take place. The Earth will then receive its paradisaical glory or become "celestialized" and those who lived on this earth and were worthy of celestial glory, will inherit it and live with God and Christ.

== Major signs preceding ==
The LDS Church believes that no man shall know the hour of the coming of Christ, however there are signs which have been given which will show that the Second Coming is approaching. Some of the major events, and their believed fulfillment states that have been prophesied, are listed below:

=== Restitution of all things ===
The Book of Acts states, "Repent ye therefore, and be converted, that your sins may be blotted out, when the times of refreshing shall come from the presence of the Lord; And he shall send Jesus Christ, which before was preached unto you: Whom the heaven must receive until the times of restitution of all things, which God hath spoken by the mouth of all his holy prophets since the world began." It is believed that this means that there must be a restitution of all things before the Second Coming. The Book of Revelation says, "And I saw another angel fly in the midst of heaven, having the everlasting gospel to preach unto them that dwell on the earth, and to every nation, and kindred, and tongue, and people". This gospel believed to be the same church that was on the earth when Christ was here initially, and that it must be restored to the earth. It would then be established throughout the world. The Church believes that the true church that was originally formed became corrupted within decades of being established by Jesus Christ. Since God is the same yesterday, today and always, this restoration would need to be done through divine revelation, the same as it has been done in times of old.

Believed fulfillment state: Majority fulfilled (more yet to come)
The LDS Church believes this was done with Joseph Smith and that he did receive divine revelation, and was called to be a prophet in modern times. The LDS Church believes itself to be the true church and that it has all of the signs in scripture about the workings of the true church. They also believe "in the same organization that existed in the Primitive Church, namely apostles, prophets, pastors, teachers, evangelists, and so forth".

=== Opposition to the restoration ===
It is believed that if there is truly a God, there must truly be a Devil. If there was true doctrine taught from God, then there must truly be a force that would do everything in his power to make men believe anything but the truth. That means that if there was a true church established by revelation, that there must be great opposition to the truth, and that those people that followed it would be seen as strange and peculiar by most.

Believed fulfillment state: Fulfilled
The LDS Church believes this has been fulfilled, both with the persecution of the early Saints, and the way that many view the Church and its people now. There are many rumors that persist which are blatant falsehoods about the people in the church, such as the practice of polygamy.

=== Elijah ===
In the Book of Malachi, it is prophesied that before the Second Coming, "Behold, I will send you Elijah the prophet before the coming of the great and dreadful day of the Lord: And he shall turn the heart of the fathers to the children, and the heart of the children to their fathers".

Believed fulfillment state: Fulfilled
It is believed that Elijah appeared to the prophet Joseph Smith on April 3, 1836, and conferred upon him the keys to the current dispensation. Although many faiths believe that Elijah will come before the Second Coming, The Church is the only major religious denomination that believes that he already has.

=== Gathering of Israel ===
The 10th Article of Faith states: "We believe in the literal gathering of Israel and in the restoration of the Ten Tribes." The tribe of Ephraim is given the privilege of leading the gathering, with the tribe of Manasseh assisting.

Believed fulfillment state: Fulfilled and in progress

==== Gathering of Judah ====
The Book of Isaiah states: "And he shall set up an ensign for the nations, and shall assemble the outcasts of Israel, and gather together the dispersed of Judah from the four corners of the earth." The LDS Church believes in both a literal gathering, and a figurative gathering. The ensign is believed to be the church, and the figurative gathering is the gathering of members into the church. The literal gathering of the dispersed of Judah is believed to be a gathering back into the Holy Land.

Believed fulfillment state: Fulfilled and in progress
In 1841 the LDS Church sent apostle Orson Hyde to the Holy Land to dedicate the land for the return of the Jewish people. At the time there were fewer than 5,000 Jewish people in the entire land of Palestine. As of 2009, there were millions of Jewish people within Israel.

=== Proselytizing in Israel ===
A sign that has yet to take place is the commencement of missionary work within Israel. The LDS Church believes that before the return of Christ, that the gospel must be taught to those who are in Israel, and the church must be legally established within those bounds.

Believed fulfillment state: currently emplaced
Currently, religious proselytizing is allowed within Israel, but the LDS Church refrains from proselytizing based on an agreement with the government of Israel.

=== Temple in Jerusalem ===
The LDS Church believes that there will be a temple built within Jerusalem. The temple within Jerusalem will be built with one additional distinguishing feature that all other LDS Church temples do not have. This temple will contain a throne, which, at times, the Savior will personally sit and reign over the house of Israel.

Concerning the temple in Jerusalem, Orson Pratt stated, "By and by there will be a Temple built at Jerusalem. Who do you think is going to build it? You may think that it will be the unbelieving Jews who rejected the Savior. I believe that which is contained on the 77th page of the Book of Mormon, as well as in many other places, in that same book, will be literally fulfilled. The Temple at Jerusalem will undoubtedly be built, by those who believe in the true Messiah. Its construction will be, in some respects different from the Temples now being built. It will contain the throne of the Lord, upon which he will, at times, personally sit, and will reign over the house of Israel for ever. It may also contain twelve other thrones, on which the twelve ancient Apostles will sit, and judge the twelve tribes of Israel."

More recently, Bruce R. McConkie stated, "Who are those 'that are far off' who shall come to Jerusalem to build the house of the Lord? Surely they are the Jews who have been scattered afar. By what power and under whose authorization shall the work be done? There is only one place under the whole heavens where the keys of temple building are found. There is only one people who know how to build temples and what to do in them when they are completed. That people is the Latter-day Saints. The temple in Jerusalem will not be built by Jews who have assembled there for political purposes as at present. It will not be built by a people who know nothing whatever about the sealing ordinances and their application to the living and the dead. It will not be built by those who know nothing about Christ and his laws and the mysteries reserved for the saints. But it will be built by Jews who have come unto Christ, who once again are in the true fold of their ancient Shepherd, and who have learned anew about temples because they know that Elijah did come, not to sit in a vacant chair at some Jewish feast of the Passover, but to the Kirtland Temple on April 3, 1836, to Joseph Smith and Oliver Cowdery. The temple in Jerusalem will be built by The Church of Jesus Christ of Latter-day Saints. 'They that are far off,' they that come from an American Zion, they who have a temple in Salt Lake City will come to Jerusalem to build there another holy house in the Jerusalem portion of 'the mountains of the Lord's house.'"

Believed fulfillment state: Pending
A temple has not been built.

=== Two witnesses in Jerusalem ===
It is believed that two people will be called to preach the gospel in the land of Jerusalem, and that they will have the faith and power to cause miracles as seen in the Book of Revelation. Since they are given the rights to prophecy, it is believed that they are prophets. These prophets will be called to teach the gospel during a time of great conflict, and will be able to keep the nations gathered against Israel at bay for their ministry. This conflict is believed to be part of the battle of Armageddon, which is to take place near Megiddo or the Valley of Jezreel. After three and a half years, they will be killed by their enemies, and their bodies will lie in the street for three and a half days. Then a large earthquake will occur and they will rise miraculously and will ascend into heaven. Any of the twelve apostles could be considered a prophet, as they are accepted by the church as prophets, seers and revelators.

Believed fulfillment state: Pending
The Church currently does not proselytize in Israel.

== Other signs preceding ==
According to one Latter-day Saint commentator, there are many signs, many of which have already passed.

Sign	Believed fulfillment state	Notes
Apostate darkness covers earth	Fulfilled	This is believed to be the time between the death of Jesus Christ to restoration of the church.
Many false churches	Fulfilled	
Spirit to be poured out on all flesh	Fulfilled	Most Church members believe this to be the pouring out of knowledge and wisdom, and can be attributed to many discoveries, and the progression of ages (i.e.: the progression out of the Dark Ages)
Discovery and use of printing	Fulfilled	
Protestant reformation and age of renaissance	Fulfilled	
Discovery and colonization of America	Fulfilled	
Establishment of the American nation	Fulfilled	
Translation and printing of the Bible	Fulfilled	
Establishment of U.S. Constitution	Fulfilled	
Latter-day revelation	Fulfilled	
Coming forth of the Book of Mormon	Fulfilled	See above: There must be a restitution of all things
Opposition to the Book of Mormon	Fulfilled	See above: There will be opposition to the restoration
Restoration of keys and priesthood	Fulfilled	See above: There must be a restitution of all things
Restoration of the gospel	Fulfilled	See above: There must be a restitution of all things
Messenger to precede second coming	Fulfilled	"And even so I have sent mine everlasting covenant into the world, to be a light to the world, and to be a standard for my people, and for the Gentiles to seek to it, and to be a messenger before my face to prepare the way before me." It is generally seen by members that the gospel itself is the messenger, however it could be considered that other messengers have been sent, including Elijah and a modern-day prophet, Joseph Smith.
Church and kingdom set up again	Fulfilled	See above: There must be a restitution of all things
Growth of the church	Fulfilled	See above: There must be a restitution of all things
Gathering of Israel	Fulfilled	See above: The descendants of Judah will gather from the four corners of the earth
Times of Gentiles being fulfilled	Fulfilled	It is believed that the coming of the Book of Mormon to the American people fulfills this prophecy.
Return of Tribe of Judah to Jerusalem	Fulfilled	See above: The descendants of Judah will gather from the four corners of the earth
Jews to begin to believe in Christ	Fulfilled	As Christ taught primarily amongst the Jewish people during his life, most of the early converts to Christianity were Jewish, however according to the Jewish Encyclopedia, "The number of post-Mendelssohnian Jews who abandoned their ancestral faith is very large". Though there is an ongoing process of people being converted to and from the Jewish faith, it is believed that most of the Jewish faith will not believe in Christ until after the Second Coming.
Building of latter-day temples	Fulfilled	
Lord to come suddenly to temple	Fulfilled	"As shown in the New Testament and the Book of Mormon, after his resurrection, Jesus Christ can, and also does, appear to people in this latter-day dispensation of the gospel. When these sacred manifestations are for personal instruction, they are not spoken of openly. However, when it is appropriate, the divine communication is made public. It is a principle of the gospel that the Lord Jesus Christ can, and will, manifest himself to his people, including individual members, in his own time, and 'in his own way, and according to his own will' (Doctrine and Covenants 88:68)." One such occasion is as follows: "One week following the dedication of the Kirtland Temple the Prophet Joseph Smith, with Oliver Cowdery, the Council of the Twelve, and several brethren of the priesthood, partook of the sacrament in the lower room of the temple. After having performed this service to the brethren of the priesthood, Joseph and Oliver retired to the pulpit on the west side of the room, and the veils that secluded them from the other brethren were dropped. The two young men then bowed their heads in solemn and silent prayer. After rising from prayer, the following glorious vision burst before them: We saw the Lord standing upon the breastwork of the pulpit, before us;"
Spirit of Elijah and genealogical research	Fulfilled	See above: Elijah the prophet is to return to the earth
Persecution of the saints	Fulfilled	See above: There will be opposition to the restoration
Persecution of the Jews	Fulfilled	
Peace taken from earth	Fulfilled	Modern prophets have stated that peace has been removed from the earth, and will not be restored until the Second Coming.
Refusal of men to believe signs of times	Fulfilled	
Ten tribes to return	Pending	According to LDS Church doctrine, the gathering of Israel is believed to be both the gathering of the tribes of Israel into the membership of the church, and the literal gathering of the tribes of Israel. It is believed that the house of Israel was scattered abroad across the earth, and most people on the earth have some lineage from the literal house of Israel. A patriarchal blessing given to faithful members is believed to contain within it the lineage from the house of Israel from which the person is descended. If one is not descended from the literal lineage, it is believed that they are "grafted" or adopted into the house of Israel when the person is baptized. Return of the ten tribes separate from the actual gathering of the tribes of Israel. There are references to "the leading of the ten tribes from the land of north" as a distinct event.
True gospel to be preached to all the world	Fulfilled and in progress	The Church currently has missionary work in countries throughout the world, and many more countries without missionary work contain members.
Worldly knowledge to increase	Fulfilled and in progress	
Scientific and inventive progress	Fulfilled and in progress	
Disease, plague, pestilence to sweep earth	Fulfilled and in progress	
Elements in commotion	Fulfilled and in progress	This is commonly believed to be upsets in common weather patterns.
Disasters and calamities to abound	Fulfilled and in progress	
Social unrest, corruption, violence to increase	Fulfilled and in progress	
Wickedness	Fulfilled and in progress	
Holy Spirit ceasing to strive with wicked	Fulfilled and in progress	In the Book of Mormon, those who the Spirit ceased to strive with often became violent and uncaring about their own salvation, or the souls of others. This often resulted in the warfare and destruction of entire groups of people.
Angels now reaping the earth	Fulfilled and in progress	It is commonly believed that this term refers to both missionary work, and to the destruction of the wicked. At this time missionary work is in progress, however the destruction of the wicked will not occur until the Second Coming.
Wars and rumors of wars	Fulfilled and in progress	
Famines, depressions, and economic turmoil	Fulfilled and in progress	
Lamanites to blossom as the rose	Fulfilled and in progress	According to the footnotes on Doctrine and Covenants 49:24, this is referring to the gospel going to the Lamanites, which are believed to be among the ancestors of the American Indians.
Sorrow and fear	Fulfilled and in progress	It is believed that this will get worse as we get closer to the Second Coming.
Beginning of the construction of the Temple of the New Jerusalem in Independence, Missouri	Pending	In August 1831, the temple grounds were marked with a cornerstone by the leadership of the church, however the Latter-day Saints were evicted from Independence in 1833. A temple was started by the Church of Christ (Temple Lot) in 1927, but was soon abandoned.
Signs on earth and heavens	Fulfilled	The prophecy of Joel was declared fulfilled by church president Gordon B. Hinckley in a sermon titled, "Living in the Fulness of Times", in the 2001 October general conference. While some may say that the moon turning to blood can be seen (for example, gazing at it through the smoke of a forest fire will give it a red color), most LDS members do not believe this is a fulfillment of this prophecy yet, and that there is a more dramatic appearance yet to be had. However, there is one recorded experience of such an event that covered a fairly wide area: New England's Dark Day.
The gathering at Adam-ondi-Ahman	Pending	It is believed that Adam will convene a meeting at Adam-ondi-Ahman to officially turn the government of the human family over to Jesus Christ. It is also believed that other patriarchal prophets throughout the Bible will gather there to return keys of their dispensation to Christ. Such an event as this would most likely not be made public knowledge; thus, fulfillment would be difficult to verify.
Final great war	Pending	It is believed that the nations will gather near Har Megiddo or the Valley of Jezreel which is located in the north part of Israel near the coast.
Fall of the great and abominable church	Pending	According to LDS Church teachings the great and abominable church is not a specific denomination, but is composed of those who fight against the saints of God and have their hearts set on the things of the world. Its members are not defined by any specific church and includes members from every denomination, including Mormons. According to Doctrine and Covenants 88 this event happens in conjunction with the Second Coming.
Special mission in Jerusalem of two latter-day prophets	Pending	See above: Two witnesses will be called to prophecy and preach within the land of Jerusalem

== See also ==
- Christian eschatology
- Dream Mine
- Eschatology
- Kingdom of God: Latter-day Saints
- Mormon cosmology
