= Snuffer (surname) =

Snuffer is a surname. Notable people with the surname include:

- Denver Snuffer Jr., American lawyer and author
- Rick Snuffer (born 1961), American politician
