= Mormon timeline =

Mormon timeline may refer to

- Mormon timeline (19th century)
- Mormon timeline (20th century)
- Mormon timeline (21st century)
