= New world order (Baháʼí) =

Baháʼí doctrine about an anticipated new system of worldwide governance

The conception of a "new world order" (Persian: نظم بدیع جهانی) found in the Baháʼí teachings refers to the gradual emergence of integrative political norms to be freely adopted by the nations and peoples of the earth, leading to a new system of worldwide governance that incorporates ideals of unity, justice, prosperity and continuing advancement for all nations, races, creeds, and classes. These new institutional forms of governance, anticipated to arise in response to unprecedented global challenges, would uphold the dignity and well-being of all, where “each member of the human race is born into the world as a trust of the whole.” The idea of global solidarity and unification, involving the political, moral and spiritual transformation of individual and collective behaviour, and leading to a flourishing global civilisation, is at the heart of Baháʼí vision, belief and action.

== Conception ==
Founder of the Baháʼí Faith Baháʼu'lláh taught that throughout history humanity has experienced periods of progress and regress as it moves through stages of social evolution towards its destined collective maturity: the realisation of a just and peaceful global polity manifesting the reality of the oneness of the human family and the inherent spiritual dignity of all members of that family. In the second half of the nineteenth century, Baháʼu'lláh exhorted the world's rulers to reconcile their differences and to "lay the foundations of the world's Great Peace”, affirming that the “earth is but one country, and mankind its citizens." In doing so, he outlined a number of steps that would lead to permanent stability in international relations. Underpinning his vision was a set of new social structures based on participation and consultation among the world's peoples. These new institutional mechanisms would eliminate conflicts of interest and thereby reduce the potential for disunity at all levels of society. A number of international institutions were envisaged: a world legislature with genuine representation and authority, an international court having final jurisdiction in all disputes between nations, and an international executive empowered to carry out the decisions of these legislative and judicial bodies. These institutions would have the means to ensure and maintain a general disarmament by applying principles of collective security. They would neither usurp nor suppress the basic autonomy of nations, would safeguard the personal freedom and initiative of individuals, and would protect long-cherished cultural traditions of the world's peoples. The system of governance outlined by Baháʼu'lláh emphasizes the importance of grassroots decision-making that is democratic in spirit and method, but also provides a level of coordination and authority that makes cooperation possible on a global scale. But the realization of this vision can only come about through a radical change in the very conception of society, chosen and implemented by the peoples of the world themselves. Such momentous change is likely to be the response to unprecedented global crises and upheavals that threaten the fabric of civilized life and the natural world itself.

In contrast to current discourses on social and political order, Baháʼu'lláh's concept emphasises the importance of spiritual, religious, and moral commitment in society, necessitating a complete redefinition not only of human relationships, but also the social structures which support them. This liberation of human potential, in the individual and in groups, is only possible when the primary organising principle of society is justice.

== Political dimensions ==
The Universal House of Justice, the governing body of the Baháʼí Faith, explains that the distinctive characteristics of the Baháʼí administrative system provide the nucleus and pattern of what will eventually become a new order for organizing the affairs of humanity envisioned by Baháʼu'lláh. This “prodigious scheme for world-wide human solidarity” entails the moral reconstruction of all human practices—a process involving a twofold change within human consciousness and social structures. The Universal House of Justice elaborates that the “pattern towards which Baháʼu'lláh wishes human society to evolve” is the “principle of organic growth”, which requires that “detailed developments, and the understanding of detailed developments, become available only with the passage of time”. Echoing ‘Abdul-Bahá’s vision of political action, the Universal House of Justice states that the establishment of a universal civilization animated by principles of equity, cooperation and empathy, is undoubtedly a " 'political’ enterprise,” in the broadest sense of the science of governance or political organization, with Bahá’ı́s following a path never before taken by those hoping to reform society. In contrast to prevalent forms of partisan political activity, focus is on the revitalisation of hearts, minds and conduct, and on offering a working model as evidence of the viability of the way of life proposed. The Universal House of Justice comments that any move towards a “Bahá’ı́ state” or polity is dependent on specific principles of participation and consent crucial to the vision of Baháʼu'lláh, principles which stress that a move towards forming a Bahá’ı́ state is entirely entrusted to the state or population wishing to take that step. Such a decision by a state and its citizens to "adopt the Bahá’ı́ Faith as the State Religion, let alone to the point at which a State would accept the Law of God as its own law and the National House of Justice as its legislature, must be a supremely voluntary and democratic process.

== Development ==
Up to now meaningful investigation of Bahá’í texts which suggest the establishment of a world government have been impeded by current negative thinking associated with the term. Writing in 1931 Shoghi Effendi foresaw a system "infinite in the diversity of the national characteristics of its federated units", a world nevertheless unified in all the fundamental elements of its life, including trade and finance, political structure and spiritual aspirations. This system would enable the functioning of a world community in which economic barriers no longer exist, the interrelationship between capital and labour is beyond doubt, and where international rule of law agreed to by the world’s combined representatives would have as its sanction an immediate and enforced intervention from "the combined forces of the federated units". Shoghi Effendi foresaw in this system a world community in which volatile, aggressive nationalism will have been transformed into a lasting awareness of "world citizenship".

Shoghi Effendi envisaged a series of intermediate stages of global governance eventually leading to an interdependent and flourishing world commonwealth, the “Most Great Peace”,— a global civilization inspired by scientific advancements and spiritual principles articulated by Baháʼu'lláh. He further explained that whilst the Bahá’i vision can't be associated solely with any previous model of governance, for example monarchy, aristocracy or democracy, it nevertheless “embodies, reconciles and assimilates within its framework” their best characteristics “without introducing within its machinery any of the objectionable features which they inherently possess”. Shoghi Effendi confirmed that this “pattern of divine civilization” challenges “most of the institutions of contemporary society”, whilst rejecting the inbuilt conflict that is an intrinsic part of current structures and processes, as in the adversarial system in civil government, the advocacy principle permeating much of civil law, contention between different classes and groups, and the inherent presence of competition in much of modern life.

Since ‘Abdul-Bahá’s passing in 1921 Shoghi Effendi, followed by the Universal House of Justice, have engaged in a model of learning which constantly builds on the knowledge and experience of the community and its co-workers, centred around the notion that the building of a just society implies unity of spirit and vision. At the heart of this process is investigation of the relationships binding together the three protagonists of society, the individual, the community, and social institutions, who for millennia have been locked in a struggle for power based on competition, a concept which has been replaced by the belief that harmonious collaboration is more likely to cultivate a civilisation concordant with a maturing humanity. This learning process has gradually expanded to include relations with human rights organizations and governmental agencies, social action groups engaged in social and economic development, and participation in public dialogue addressing contemporary issues of concern. By the beginning of the twenty-first century this culture of learning, which is available to all people of like mind, was becoming established globally, the overarching purpose being to acquire skills in order to create a united humanity defined by justice, peace, and universally shared prosperity. In order to sustain and build on this emerging culture of learning a network of educational institutes was established during the 1990s enabling the training of human resources, and organised through an evolving process operating at both local and global levels. People from all ethnicities, classes and creeds are invited by the Baháʼí community to participate in this process which involves a system of action, reflection, consultation and study with constant reference not only to the writings of the Faith but also to an in depth and objective analysis of the patterns unfolding. Sincere consultation, which Baháʼu'lláh hails as being a lamp of guidance and recognised as being a vital element in a united society, is practised by the community in its decision making in order to achieve a united understanding of the truth rather than the winning of an argument, and consists of constructive communication which promotes understanding and well-being. Through this programme, an approach to training has developed in which growing circles of participants have become involved in ever expanding endeavours to increase the growth and development of communities. Regular examination of the process includes focusing on maintaining the system of learning, building the number of participants involved, and on how to structure a growing global experience. The spread of these educational processes to a growing number of groups and populations around the world is drawing increasing attention from thinkers and leaders everywhere.

== See also ==
- Baháʼí International Community
- Democratic globalization
- Dispensation of the fulness of times
- Futures studies
- Global justice
- New world order (politics)
- The Promise of World Peace
- The Secret of Divine Civilization
- Utopia
- World federalism
- World to come
