= Denver Snuffer Jr. =

American lawyer and religious leader

Personal life
- Born: Denver Carlos Snuffer Jr.
- Home town: Mountain Home, Idaho
- Children: Six daughters and two sons
- Education: Daniel Webster Junior College; McMurry University; Brigham Young University (J.D., 1980)

Religious life
- Religion: (Independent Mormon) Restorationist and supra-denominational Christian
- Church: Utah Believers Group
- Profession: Author; Attorney

Senior posting
- Based in: Sandy, Utah
- Present post: Principal preparer for and inspirer of Remnant movement fellowships
- Previous post: LDS Church Sandy Crescent Stake high council (Excommunicated from mainstream LDS in 2013)
- Website: denversnuffer.com

Denver Carlos Snuffer Jr. is an American lawyer, author, lecturer and religious leader, who claims to be a "revelator to fellowships of the remnants movement," a spiritual movement in schism with the Church of Jesus Christ of Latter-day Saints (LDS Church). The movement has a few thousand adherents, many of them members or former members of the LDS Church. He was excommunicated by the LDS Church in 2013 for refusing to cease publication of his 2011 book, Passing the Heavenly Gift which challenges many points of LDS orthodoxy. He subsequently has been identified as a prophet by many in Christian fellowships of "the Remnants" movement, and several of his teachings have been canonized as scripture.

== Biography ==
Snuffer grew up in a devout Baptist household in Mountain Home, Idaho, and in 1973 converted to the LDS Church in New Hampshire during early adulthood. He received degrees from Daniel Webster Junior College and McMurry University and a Juris Doctor (J.D.) degree from the J. Reuben Clark Law School.

Peggy Fletcher Stack, religion columnist for the Salt Lake Tribune, has expressed Snuffer's thesis in Passing the Heavenly Gift, as "every Mormon prophet, starting with Brigham Young, caved to social, political and legal pressures to accommodate mainstream American society". Snuffer states in the book that he has seen and spoken with Jesus. A 2012 episode of Mormon Stories Podcast described Snuffer as a "progressive, fundamentalist, non-polygamist Mormon lawyer who claims to have seen Christ". Snuffer characterized this description of him as sensationalized.

Snuffer's book, The Second Comforter: Conversing With the Lord Through the Veil, outlines a process for receiving a personal visitation from the resurrected Jesus.

In August 2013, Snuffer's Sandy, Utah, stake president informed him that the continued publication of Passing the Heavenly Gift constituted apostasy since the "book's thesis is in direct conflict with church doctrine." The only way Snuffer could avoid church discipline was to cease its publication and to cancel a planned speaking tour thought to be for promoting the ideas expressed in the book. Snuffer's negotiations with his stake president resulted in an impasse—with Snuffer claiming that his stake president received instructions from LDS Church leaders in Salt Lake City to proceed—and he was excommunicated from the church in September 2013. In November 2013, Snuffer said his appeal to the First Presidency of the church to have the excommunication reversed was denied.

== Covenant Christians (also known as Fellowships of the remnants movement) ==
Snuffer intended Passing the Heavenly Gift and his other works to promote loyalty to the LDS Church and did not expect to be instrumental in starting a new denomination. In 2014, Snuffer said that "the Lord terminated the priesthood authority" of all church leadership who were involved in his excommunication, including the First Presidency. Since then, Snuffer has been at the center of a loosely organized movement who see him as a prophet. As of 2017, approximately 50 fellowships worldwide have registered on an affiliated website. Fellowships adherents gathered in conferences in 2016 and 2017, the latter of which canonized Snuffer's teachings as scripture. The movement's canon consists of, among other texts, a reworking of scripture from the LDS Church, including the Book of Mormon, Snuffer's expanded translation of the Book of John, and several of Snuffer's own revelations. The movement de-emphasizes hierarchy and organization, with, for example, its Minnesota fellowship claiming to have no leadership.

Movement fellowship appears to draw largely from members or former members of the LDS Church, which has led some LDS Church authorities to identify Snuffer and his teachings as a vehicle for leading people out of that church. In 2017, the website MormonLeaks published a PowerPoint presentation that was shown in 2015 to the LDS Quorum of the Twelve Apostles. In it, Snuffer was identified as one of 17 "Issues and Ideas Leading People Away" from mainstream LDS doctrine.

In September 2017, Snuffer helped organize the Covenant of Christ Conference in Boise, Idaho, at the Egyptian Theater. The conference voted on the canonization of scripture, and discussed the building of a temple.

== Publications ==
Books

- The Second Comforter: Conversing with the Lord Through the Veil (Mill Creek Press, 2006) ISBN 9780974015873
- Nephi's Isaiah (Mill Creek Press, 2006) ISBN 9780974015897
- Eighteen Verses: A Discussion of the Book of Mormon (Mill Creek Press, 2007) ISBN 9780979845529
- Ten Parables (Mill Creek Press, 2008) ISBN 9780979845574
- Beloved Enos (Mill Creek Pres, 2009) ISBN 9780979845581
- Come, Let Us Adore Him (Mill Creek Press, 2009) ISBN 9780979845536
- Removing the Condemnation (Mill Creek Press, 2011) ISBN 9780615438863
- Discoveries in Chiasmus - A Pattern in All Things (co-authored, Digital Legend Press, 2011) ASIN B00PV6PB0M
- Passing the Heavenly Gift (Mill Creek Press, 2011) ISBN 9780615528960
- Remembering the Covenant (5 vols., Mill Creek Press, 2013) ISBN 9780989150309
- Essays: Three Degrees (Mill Creek Press, 2014) ISBN 978-0989150354
- Preserving the Restoration (Mill Creek Press, 2015) ISBN 978-0989150361
- A Man Without Doubt (Mill Creek Press, 2016) ISBN 978-0989150378
- Religion of the Fathers: Context for the Book of Abraham (Independent, 2021) ISBN 978-1951168773
- The Testimony of Jesus: Past, Present and Promise (Restoration Archive, 2021) ISBN 978-1951168827

Selected articles

- Plural Marriage (PDF). Sandy, Utah: Self-published. March 22, 2015.
- Other Sheep Indeed: Presented at the Salt Lake City Sunstone Symposium (print) (PDF). Self-published. 2017(audio)

Revelations and scriptural texts

- "The Proverbs, Chapter 10: The Proverbs of Denver Snuffer, Jr.". Restoration edition [preview]: The Joseph Smith New Translation of The Holy Bible. Scriptures.info. March 2017. pp. 589–592.
- "Section 54: Revelation given to Joseph Smith, Nauvoo, Illinois, 12 July 1843. Revision by Denver Snuffer Jr.". Restoration edition [preview] Doctrine and Covenants; Pearls of Great Price. Scriptures.info. March 2017. pp. 147–150.
- "Continuing Revelation". Restoration edition [preview] Doctrine and Covenants; Pearls of Great Price. Scriptures.info. March 2017. pp. 313–321.

== See also ==
- Mormonism and history
- September Six
