= Truth & Transparency Foundation =

American whistleblowing organization (2016–2022)

- MormonLeaks logo
- Abbreviation: TTF
- Predecessor: MormonWikiLeaks
- Formation: December 19, 2016; 9 years ago
- Founder: Ryan McKnight
- Type: Document archive and disclosure
- Purpose: Publicize secret LDS Church documents
- Region served: Las Vegas, Nevada, United States
- Official language: English
- Staff: Five volunteers and one attorney
- Volunteers: 5
- Website: truthandtransparency.org
- Formerly called: MormonLeaks; MormonWikiLeaks

Truth & Transparency Foundation (TTF; formerly MormonLeaks and originally Mormon WikiLeaks) was a whistleblowing organization inspired by WikiLeaks, which focused on exposing documents from the leadership of the Church of Jesus Christ of Latter-day Saints (LDS Church). Founded in December 2016 and ceasing operations in April 2022, Truth & Transparency was a nonprofit newsroom dedicated to religious accountability through impact journalism.

It began in October 2016 as a leaked series of videos on the YouTube channel Mormon Leaks. In total, 15 videos were initially leaked via the Mormon Leaks channel from meetings of high-ranking LDS leaders including the Quorum of the Twelve. They discussed topics including the "homosexual agenda", the subprime mortgage crisis, and a debate over the sexual orientation of Chelsea Manning. Politicians featured in the videos included former Utah governor Mike Leavitt and former U.S. Senator from Oregon Gordon H. Smith.

Ryan McKnight, founder of TTF, was interviewed by The New York Times about his YouTube channel Mormon Leaks, and this led to contacts from Reddit who asked him for a secure way to send files. He set up a website to allow whistleblowers to protect their anonymity. The submission process ensures confidentiality, including erasure of IP addresses, asking leakers to use the privacy browser Tor, sending documents via SecureDrop, and additional encryption methods. Initial funding was raised through GoFundMe, and an official Twitter account was set up. The site's intent is to increase transparency of LDS Church leadership, and would not leak names of lower-level employees, instead focusing on the Quorum of the Twelve and the First Presidency.

University of Tampa professor Ryan Cragun said scholars were interested in finding out what documents would be revealed, noting there was a dearth of information available about the finances of the LDS Church. He said active Mormons were unlikely to view the leaked materials, but the material would have a more significant impact on those who were questioning or had already resigned their membership status. Mormon scholar and columnist Jana Riess gave a mixed assessment, criticizing their tactics regarding privacy while saying it could help to increase LDS Church leadership transparency. Utah attorney and Mormon blogger Steve Evans said the practice of leaking was criminal publication of stolen property, and said LDS Church employees who leaked material were likely violating a non-disclosure agreement.

== Organization ==
=== Beginnings on YouTube ===
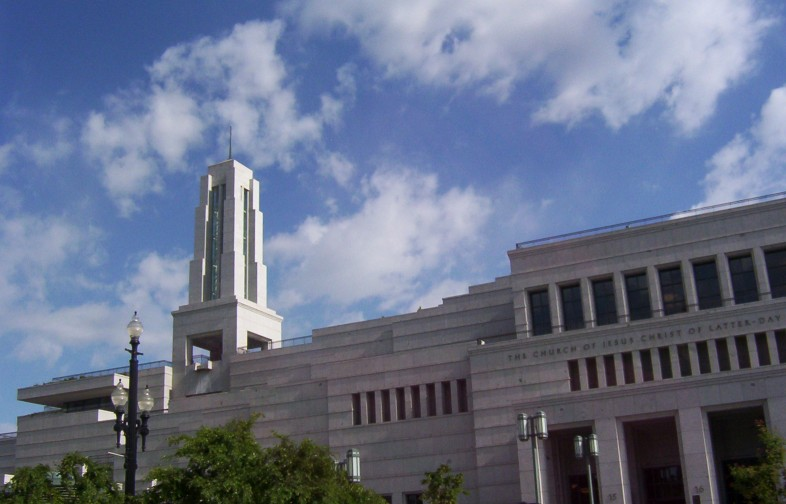
Videos were posted to the YouTube channel Mormon Leaks on the last day of the October 2016 LDS General Conference.

Ryan McKnight, the site's founder, had previously gained attention in October 2016 when he was interviewed by The New York Times about his YouTube channel Mormon Leaks, which released videos of top LDS leadership executive discussions. McKnight is a former Mormon, having resigned from the LDS Church in 2014, residing in Las Vegas, Nevada. The anonymous individual who sent him the videos via email, according to McKnight, had been holding onto them for a period of years but with the intention to do something with them eventually. Within a time span of under a month the YouTube channel had garnered 2,200 followers.

The LDS Church did not publicly question the veracity of the videos, which included top leadership debating the "homosexual agenda". Additional topics discussed by the high-level LDS Church leadership in the videos included marijuana, Islam, the subprime mortgage crisis, and a debate over the sexual orientation of Chelsea Manning. LDS Church spokesman Eric Hawkins provided an official response, which stated: "In these committee meetings, presentations are routinely received from various religious, political and subject matter experts on various topics. The purpose is to understand issues that may face the Church, and is in pursuit of the obligation Church leaders feel to be informed on and have open discussion about current issues. This is an informational forum, not a decision-making body." Hawkins pointed out the videos were from a timeframe of 2007 through 2012.

In total the 15 videos were published to YouTube on the last day of the October 2016 LDS General Conference. Most of the videos were from closed session events only attended by high-level LDS Church leadership. The majority of them depicted lectures given to the Quorum of the Twelve, the second-highest ranking leadership group within the LDS Church. Mike Leavitt, former governor of Utah, appeared in a video filmed in 2012 and gave a presentation on State Religious Freedom Restoration Acts. Gordon H. Smith, former U.S. senator from Oregon, was shown in another video talking to the LDS Church leadership. Smith lectured the LDS Church leaders about the "inestimable power" yielded from being able to contact U.S. Senators whenever necessary for assistance. The lectures given to LDS Church leadership in this fashion were businesslike, with statistics and Microsoft PowerPoint presentations.

McKnight suddenly found himself the point-person on the Internet for those wishing to maintain anonymity and yet simultaneously publicize secret documents from the LDS Church. After the videos engendered debate and attention from Mormons and the wider Internet community, McKnight was asked to add more videos from people who messaged him on Reddit. After another anonymous user on Reddit asked him, he publicized documents from the LDS Church detailing a rules modification about homosexual partners. Reddit users asked him for a more secure means of submitting documents about the LDS Church.

=== Transition to dedicated website ===
TTF uses Tor privacy browser and secure communication SecureDrop to protect confidentiality.

McKnight decided to found TTF so whistleblowers could protect their anonymity. Since his increased attention from the October videos and the November policy change leaks, McKnight has been contacted by 25 sources inside and outside of the LDS Church with potential material to release. McKnight and his team spent six months planning creation of the organization. He estimated approximately a potential for between hundreds to thousands of additional individuals who may wish to leak information through the site. The organization has no affiliation with Fred Karger or his website MormonTips.com, which also publicizes confidential documents from the LDS Church. MormonLeaks takes steps to protect confidentiality of their sources, including erasing all IP addresses from submissions and removing watermarks from submitted materials. The site asks users who wish to submit secret documents to use the Tor privacy browser to protect themselves. Users then send the documents to TTF via SecureDrop. Encryption methods are further incorporated to mask the identity of the whistleblowers. The motivation behind the organization is to increase transparency of LDS Church leadership.

The TTF website (then "MormonLeaks") launched on December 19, 2016. The organization was started with a website and accompanying Twitter page. The TTF team works to verify documents before posting them live. This fact-checking team includes five volunteers and an attorney. MormonLeaks does not take funding through advertising. Funds to start TTF itself were initially raised through donations from GoFundMe. The hope of its founder was that TTF would demonstrate the LDS Church's profitable nature as a business as opposed to its assertion of religious status. The founder said it was highly unlikely the LDS Church would voluntarily publicize more of its innermost proceedings, saying it "will never be voluntarily transparent, they have nothing to gain from it". The site's intention was to avoid publishing specific lists of names of membership, and instead focus on economic information and internal organization policies and procedures. The site intended to limit disclosure of actual people's names to high-ranking officials including the Quorum of the Twelve and the First Presidency.

The organization's first leaks appeared on December 19, 2016, in the form of LDS Church documents from 2010. It published four files onto its account on Facebook as of December 20, 2016. The first documents publicized by TTF included memos about legal procedures, a letter to the temple department's executive director regarding unsanctioned materials on the Internet, and an organizational chart for the intellectual property division of the LDS Church. TTF asserts to have been offered documents from two separate individuals who were employees of the LDS Church concerning tithing information of famous Mormons, including American football quarterback Steve Young.

After TTF (then "MormonLeaks") had posted a handful a number of LDS Church documents for four months, the Church sent a cease-and-desist letter alleging copyright infringement with regard to a leaked Church leadership PowerPoint presentation published by TTF in February 2017. The PowerPoint discussed societal pressures that the Church felt had led some LDS members to apostasy, which included pornography, the issues agitated for by Ordain Women, and questions regarding Mormon history such as those promoted in books by lawyer and fundamentalist Mormon Denver Snuffer or in online postings by psychologist social critic John Dehlin. TTF pulled the offending document for a short while, until its attorney, Marc Randazza, sent the LDS Church a letter which said, "At this point, my client is willing to let bygones be bygones. If your client is willing to step back from the brink, and to cease efforts to censor this material, my client is willing to refrain from bringing a claim [of abusing copyright law]."

== FaithLeaks ==
In 2018, McKnight and Dodge launched FaithLeaks, a similar website. FaithLeaks hosts documents in relation to transparency about the Jehovah's Witnesses. It initially published papers about an internal investigation of alleged sexual abuse. These exemplify attempted to deal with the cases through the congregation's internal disciplinary court. FaithLeaks was hoped to help highlight cases of corruption by religious organizations, and was particularly concerned with issues of finance, policies, procedures and sex abuse settlements. After a settlement with the Watch Tower Bible and Tract Society of Pennsylvania all their copyrighted documents were removed and Truth & Transparency, and its founders, Ryan McKnight and Ethan Gregory Dodge, were forbidden to publish copyrighted material owned by the Watch Tower Society again.

== Reception ==
WikiLeaks was aware of the foundation under the site's original name of MormonWikiLeaks, and sent them a message on Twitter asking them to change their name. The founder originally stated he would retain the name as MormonWikiLeaks, and said a trademark application was pending.

University of Tampa professor Ryan Cragun said academics were excited to discover more information about the economics behind the LDS Church, as members tithe 10 percent of their earnings and there was not much in the way of transparent documents available to research their holdings and finances. Cragun said it was unlikely active members of the LDS Church would end up viewing the leaked documents because they were "highly insulated". However, he notes documents would have a greater impact on someone who is considering leaving the LDS Church: "For someone in the middle of a faith transition, such information is more fuel for the fire."

Editor-in-chief of The Nonprofit Quarterly, Ruth McCambridge, wrote that the appearance of MormonLeaks was reflective of an increasing trend by individuals to use technology to force nonprofit organizations to be transparent and accountable to the public. MormonLeaks has an attorney on staff, which McCambridge notes may be beneficial given the prior litigation history where the LDS Church made a copyright infringement assertion against WikiLeaks for publishing the church's Handbook of Instructions.

Mormon scholar and columnist Jana Riess was critical of the organization's tactics, stating: "I am very concerned about privacy in our culture more generally. People in the workplace have the right to expect that intraoffice communication and their emails will stay private." She called MormonLeaks "disturbing" and said: "It is not good news for any of us." On a positive note, Riess said it could motivate the upper LDS Church leadership to increase its transparency.

Utah attorney and Mormon blogger Steve Evans called TTF (then "MormonLeaks") "a rebranding exercise of McKnight's existing practice of posting various confidential items." Evans said TTF had "an added layer of cybersecurity, which won't necessarily protect the leakers, depending on their methods of obtaining the various stolen documents, videos, etc." Evans was critical of McKnight's encouragement to those who choose to leak information to TTF: "the leakers are likely either church employees or consultants working for the church. In either of those situations, it's very likely that the leakers are violating their nondisclosure and confidentiality agreements with the church. McKnight is now publicly encouraging people to violate these agreements."

== See also ==
- Criticism of the Church of Jesus Christ of Latter-day Saints
- Mormon Tips
- Digital rights
- Freedom of information
- GlobaLeaks
- Homosexuality and The Church of Jesus Christ of Latter-day Saints
- Mormonism in the 21st century
- Open society
- Transparency (behavior)
