= Mormonism in the 21st century =

== 2000s ==
=== 2000 ===
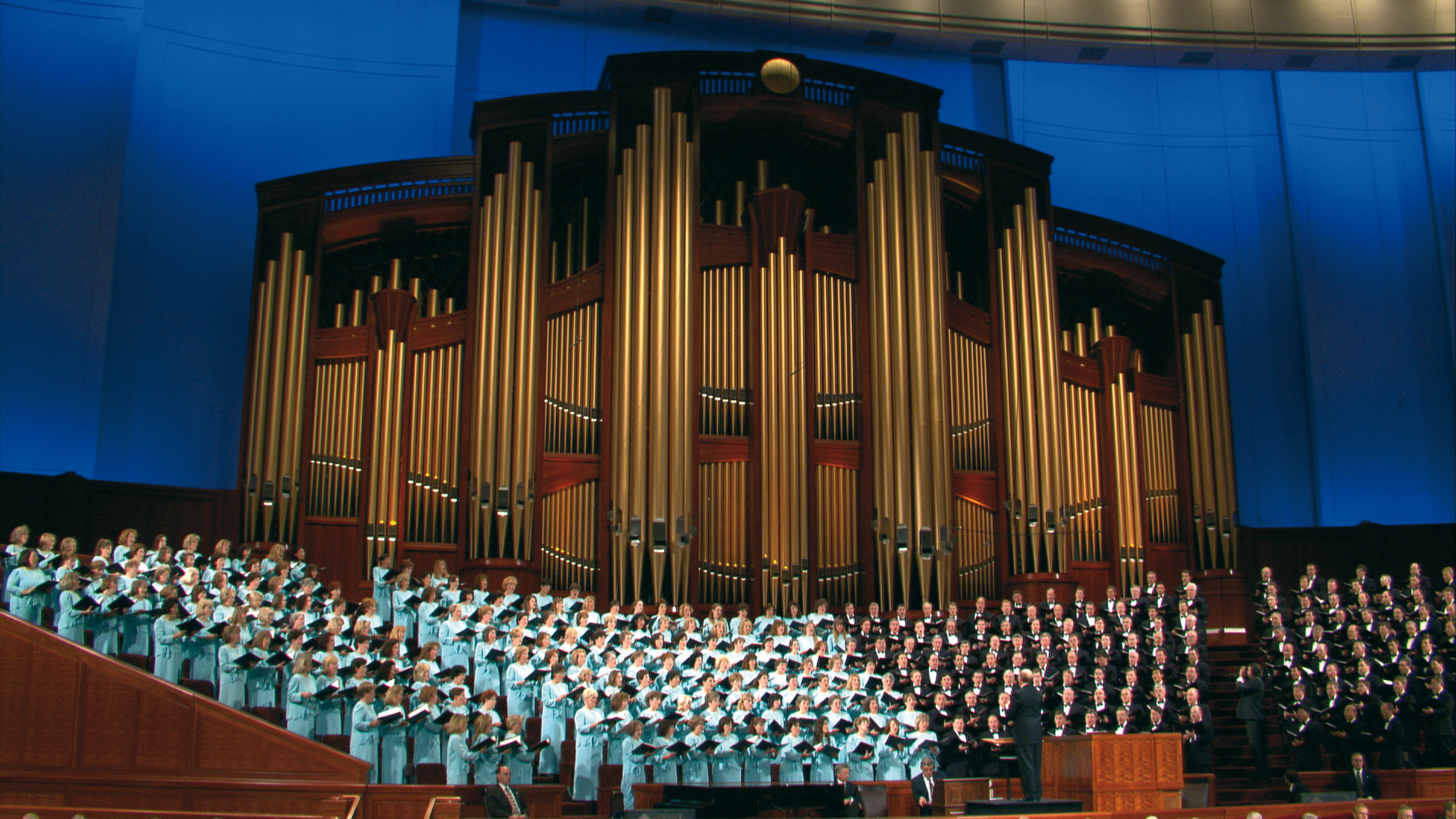
The LDS Conference Center in Salt Lake City, Utah becomes the new home to General Conference.

- January: The name Liahona is adopted by all LDS Church international magazines in all languages.
- January 1: "The Living Christ" is issued by the First Presidency and Quorum of the Twelve Apostles, a declaration of LDS doctrine about Jesus.
- February: The 100 millionth Book of Mormon is printed.
- March 10: Release of God's Army, starting the Mormon cinema movement.
- April 1–2: LDS Conference Center hosts its first General Conference, which can now accommodate 21,000 attendees.
- April 6: Palmyra New York Temple is dedicated, which is broadcast to 1.5 million LDS members in Canada and the U.S.
- June 21: Announcement that Ricks College, an LDS Church-run junior college in Rexburg, Idaho, will become a four-year university by the end of 2001.
- September: Most LDS Church members are not English speakers, reflecting its growth outside the USA.
- October 1: The Boston Massachusetts Temple is dedicated and becomes the church's 100th operating temple.
- Fall: Swahili translation of the Book of Mormon.
- December 29: Book of Mormon is translated into 100 languages, with the publishing of Eastern Armenian, Amharic, Latvian, Lithuanian, and Xhosa.

=== 2001 ===
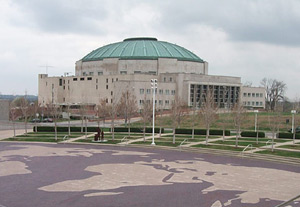
The Auditorium where the RLDS Church adopts the name Community of Christ.

- January 20: Mormon Tabernacle Choir sings at the United States presidential inauguration of George W. Bush.
- April 6: Reorganized Church of Jesus Christ of Latter Day Saints (RLDS) changes its name to Community of Christ to differentiate itself from the LDS Church.
- March 30: Release of Brigham City, murder mystery set in Mormon community.
- March 31: The Perpetual Education Fund is established.
- August 7: Sea Trek 2001 launches from Denmark, eventually to arrive in New York City on October 4.
- August 10: Ricks College officially becomes Brigham Young University-Idaho.
- November 22: Confessions of a Mormon Boy by Steven Fales opens (later becoming an off Broadway show), dealing with Fales' homosexuality, and disaffection with the church.
- December 14: Release of The Other Side of Heaven, which becomes the highest grossing Mormon-themed movie of all time.
- BYU Jerusalem Center is closed due to Second Intifada.
- American Sign Language, Gilbertese and Mongolian translations of Book of Mormon.

=== 2002 ===
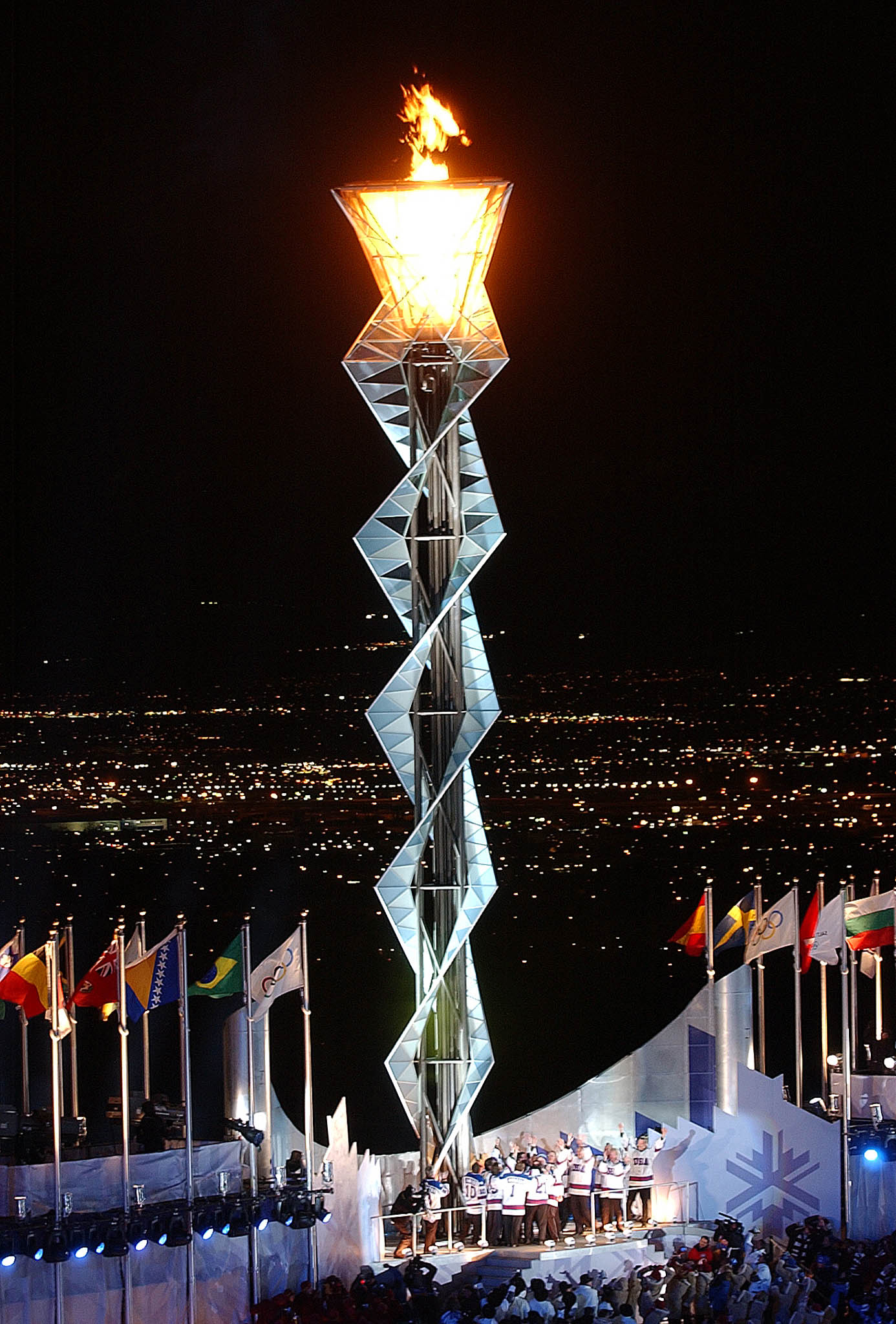
Olympic flame during the opening ceremonies of the 2002 Winter Olympics.

- February 1: Release of the film The Singles Ward, which is successful within the Mormon community.
- February 8–24: Salt Lake City hosts the 2002 Winter Olympics. Although hit by a bid scandal, the games were generally given great reviews. The Mormon Tabernacle Choir received worldwide attention for their role in the games. Utah's history was also widely publicized.
- May 22: Missionary Training Center opens in Ghana, the first in Africa.
- June 5: Elizabeth Smart kidnapping. The perpetrator, Brian David Mitchell, had been raised in a mainline LDS family, but taken to polygamous beliefs.
- June 27: The rebuilt Nauvoo Temple is dedicated.
- October 5: At General Conference, M. Russell Ballard calls for "raising the bar" on standards for LDS missionary applicants.
- Tok Pisin translation of Book of Mormon.

=== 2003 ===
- January 31: Release of The R.M., a comedy film.
- July 15: Under the Banner of Heaven is published by noted author Jon Krakauer. It juxtaposes the history of LDS Church, and a modern double murder committed in the name of God by brothers Ron and Dan Lafferty, who subscribed to a fundamentalist version of Mormonism. The church issued an official statement criticizing historical errors in the book and its anti-religion tone.
- July 9: Apia Samoa Temple burns down during renovations, and is later rebuilt.
- August 7: The Osmond Family were honored for their achievements in the entertainment industry with a star on the Hollywood Walk of Fame.
- September 12: Release of The Book of Mormon Movie, Vol. 1: The Journey. Despite being panned by critics, it made a surplus at the end of its theatrical run.
- November 12: Mormon Tabernacle Choir receives the National Medal of Arts, presented by U.S. President George W. Bush.
- November 19: All About Mormons episode of South Park airs.
- Tswana, Zulu and Marshallese translations of the Book of Mormon.

=== 2004 ===
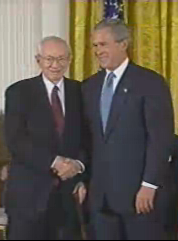
George W. Bush awarded Gordon B. Hinckley the Presidential Medal of Freedom.

- January 11: The Accra Ghana Temple is dedicated, the first in "black" Africa.
- March 24: A resolution from the Illinois legislature expresses regret for expelling the Mormons after the death of Joseph Smith.
- April 3: Creation of the Sixth Quorum of the Seventy.
- June 11: Release of Napoleon Dynamite, a mainstream film set in a Mormon community, by Jared Hess. It made more than a hundred times its original budget.
- June 23: U.S. President George W. Bush awards LDS President Gordon B. Hinckley the Presidential Medal of Freedom, the highest civilian honor awarded by the United States, recognizing his work in humanitarian aid and worldwide education funding.
- July 21: LDS apostle Neal A. Maxwell dies.
- July 31: LDS apostle David B. Haight dies.
- August 1: One million LDS Church members in Mexico.
- August 7: The last official performance of the pageant City of Joseph is held in Nauvoo, Illinois. It is replaced in 2005 with a new pageant commemorating Joseph Smith's 200th birthday.
- October 2: Dieter F. Uchtdorf and David A. Bednar are sustained to the Quorum of the Twelve Apostles. Uchtdorf is the first Apostle born outside North America since John A. Widtsoe died in 1952.
- November 6: Missionary discussions are replaced by Preach My Gospel, a new program emphasizing "teaching by the Spirit."
- November 24: The Work and the Glory, a film based on Gerald N. Lund's novel, is released. It is Mormon cinema's 2nd biggest box office hit, and only the second LDS film to top $3 million in theaters, along with The Other Side of Heaven (2001).
- November 30: Ken Jennings, a Mormon, ends his record-breaking 74-game winning streak on the TV show Jeopardy!.

=== 2005 ===
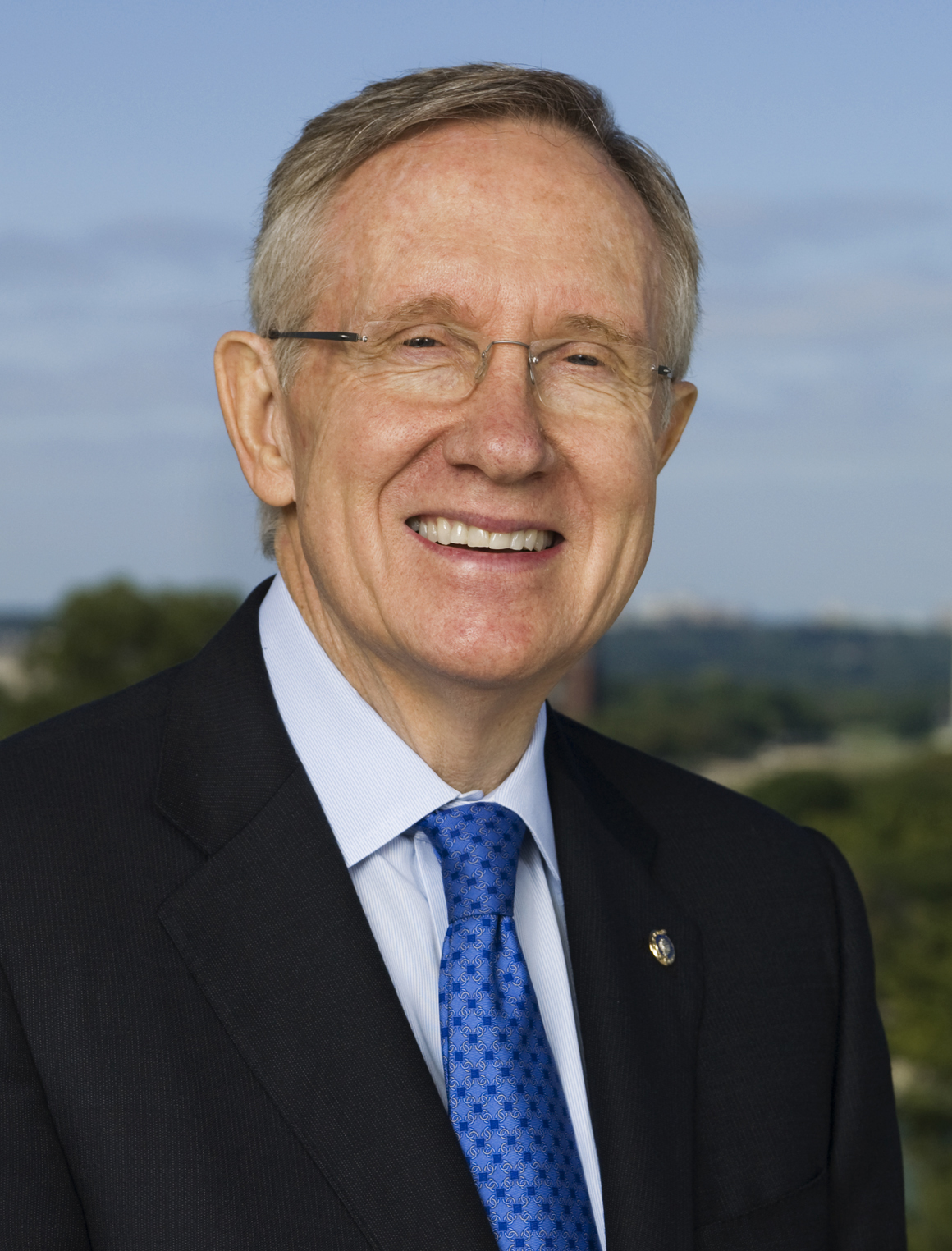
Harry Reid becomes the top Democrat in the U.S. Senate.

- January 3: Harry Reid, a Mormon convert from Nevada, becomes the top Democrat in the United States Senate.
- April 19: The Seventh and Eighth Quorums of Seventy are created.
- May 6–7: "The Worlds of Joseph Smith" conference at the Library of Congress hosts leading scholars on Mormonism's founding prophet.
- July–August: First annual Nauvoo Pageant held in Nauvoo, Illinois, in honor of Joseph Smith's 200th birthday.
- September 4: Mormon Stories Podcast is launched.
- September 27: Joseph Smith: Rough Stone Rolling is published by Knopf.
- December 23: The 200th anniversary of Joseph Smith's birth is celebrated, preceded by a variety of events throughout the year.
- Tamil translation of the Book of Mormon.

=== 2006 ===
- March 12: First broadcast of HBO's Big Love, a series about Mormon fundamentalists in Utah. The LDS Church criticizes the show for not differentiating clearly between mainstream and schismatic Mormonism. An LDS Church public statement cites concerns over the program's depiction of abuse, polygamy, use of stereotypes, and television's depiction of moral and civic values in general. In March 2009, the LDS Church stated that HBO displayed insensitivity to church members by depicting simulated segments of the church's Endowment ceremony in an episode of Big Love. The church also stated that the show had continued to blur the distinction between the LDS Church and "the show's fictional non-Mormon characters."
- June 9: BYU Jerusalem Center re-opens.
- June 29: The LDS Church announces that the Church College of New Zealand will not admit more students and eventually close.
- August 29: Warren Jeffs, leader of the FLDS Church, is arrested after being on the FBI's Most Wanted List for nearly 4 months. He faced sexual charges in Arizona, Utah, and Texas.
- September 3: Gordon B. Hinckley dedicates the Sacramento California Temple, the LDS Church's 123rd temple.
- October 22: Gordon B. Hinckley dedicates the Helsinki Finland Temple, the LDS Church's 124th temple.
- October: The Book of Mormon's introduction is modified to say the Lamanites "are among the ancestors of the American Indians," replacing the statement that "they are the principal ancestors." This is seen as a reaction to recent geography and DNA studies.

=== 2007 ===
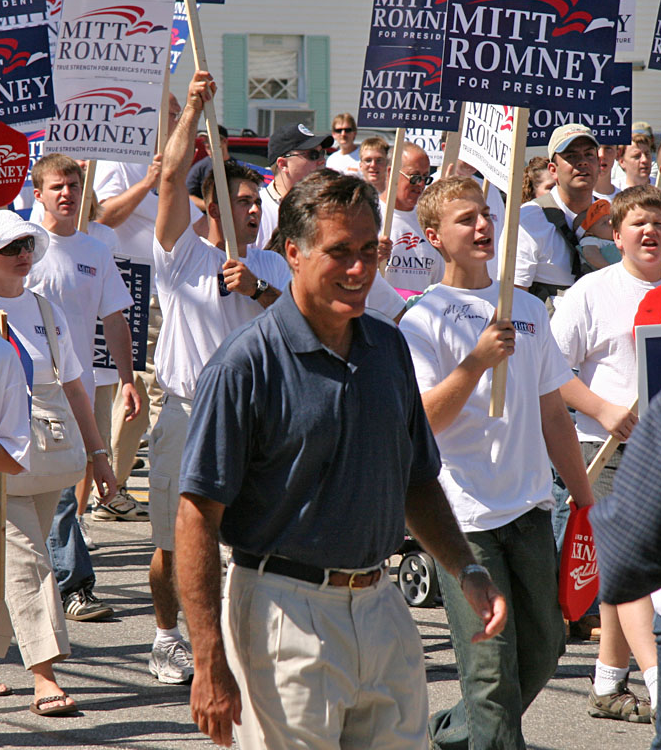
Mitt Romney and supporters at the Labor Day parade in Milford, New Hampshire.

- February 13: Mitt Romney announces his candidacy for the 2008 Republican nomination for President of the United States. Coming from a prominent Mormon family, Romney was a devout member and former local church leader. His faith was a frequent high-profile issue and troubled some voters. He usually avoided discussing Mormon doctrines, but on December 6 Romney attempted to settle concerns in a speech entitled "Faith in America".
- February 13: Utah State University names Philip Barlow as their first professor of Mormon Studies, the first at a secular university.
- April 30 – May 1: PBS broadcasts The Mormons, a four-hour documentary about the LDS Church, featuring numerous interviews of major scholars, church members, and top leaders.
- June 26: LDS Church announces it has called its one millionth missionary.
- August 10: James E. Faust, Second Counselor in the church's First Presidency, dies.
- September 11: The Mountain Meadows massacre 150th anniversary memorial is held, with descendants of the victims and LDS leaders attending. A statement by Henry B. Eyring expresses regret, meant as an apology.
- October 6: Henry B. Eyring is sustained as Second Counselor in the First Presidency.
- October 6: Quentin L. Cook is sustained to the Quorum of the Twelve Apostles.
- October 15: Release of Passage to Zarahemla, a children's film. According to BoxOfficeMojo the film ranks 46th on the all-time highest gross box office for a Christian film coming in just behind Pride & Prejudice: A Latter-Day Comedy, and in the top 100 for "Fantasy Live-Action."
- October 19: Claremont Graduate University names Richard L. Bushman as their first professor of Mormon Studies, to start Fall 2008.
- Urdu and Yoruba translations of the Book of Mormon.

=== 2008 ===
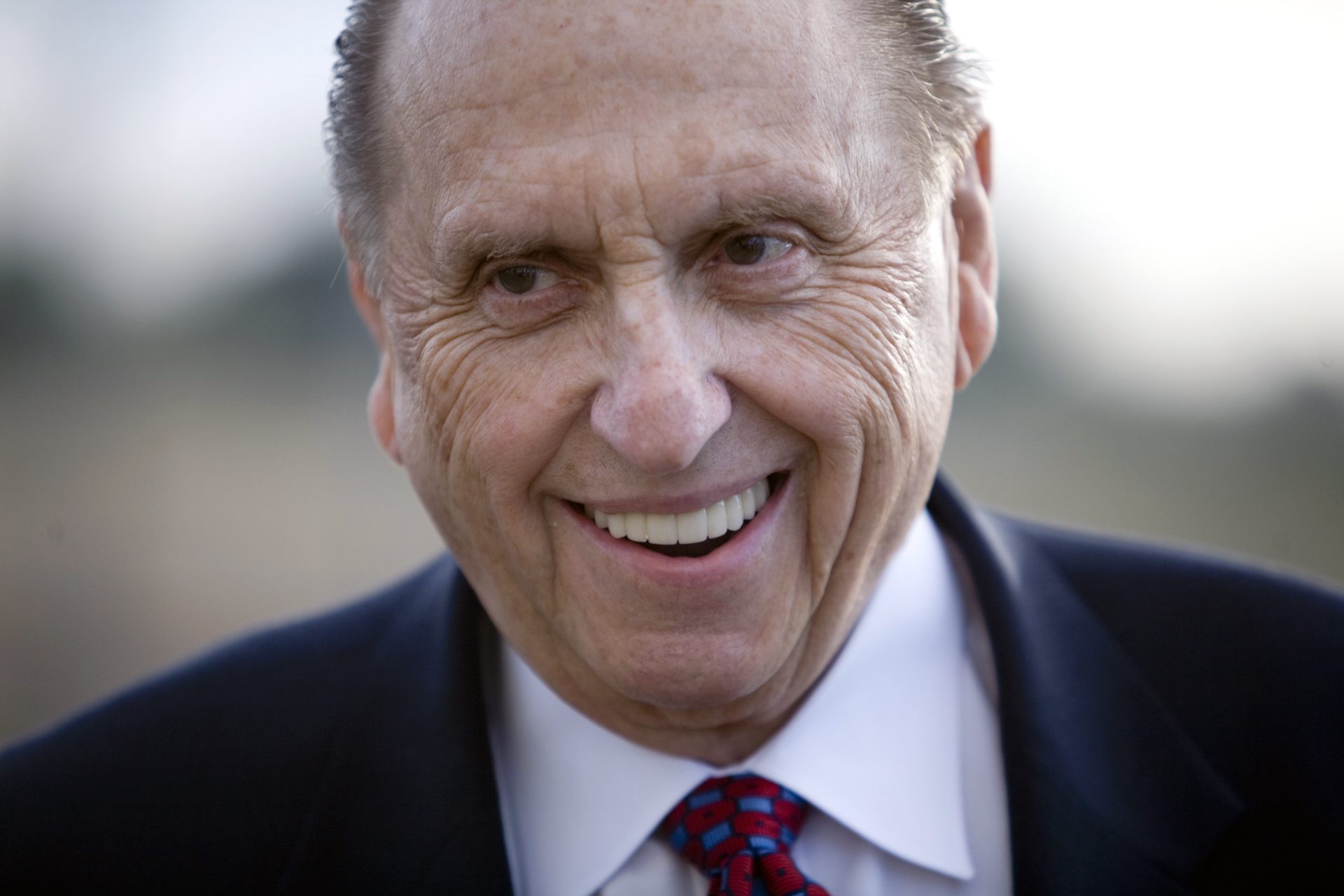
Thomas S. Monson becomes the new President of the Church.

- January 10: Mormon Times founded.
- January 27: Gordon B. Hinckley, the 15th president of the LDS Church, dies.
- February 3: Thomas S. Monson becomes 16th president of the LDS Church, with Henry B. Eyring and Dieter F. Uchtdorf as his counselors in the First Presidency.
- February 7: Mitt Romney, withdraws his presidential bid, following victories by John McCain in the Super Tuesday primaries.
- February 10: Thomas S. Monson dedicates the Rexburg Idaho Temple, the LDS Church's 125th temple.
- March 4: Craig Jessop, director of the Mormon Tabernacle Choir, resigns abruptly.
- April 3: The FLDS Church's compound nearby Eldorado, Texas is raided by officers of the State of Texas, acting on a call reporting child abuse. 533 women and children were removed from the ranch.
- April 5: D. Todd Christofferson is sustained to the Quorum of the Twelve Apostles.
- April 5: The Vatican issued a statement calling the practice known as baptism for the dead "erroneous" and directing its dioceses to keep parish records from Mormons performing genealogical research.
- June 1: Thomas S. Monson dedicates the Curitiba Brazil Temple, the LDS Church's 126th temple.
- August: Sinhala translation of the Book of Mormon.
- August 10: Thomas S. Monson dedicates the Panama City Panama Temple, the LDS Church's 127th temple.
- August 24: Thomas S. Monson dedicates the Twin Falls Idaho Temple, the LDS Church's 128th temple and 4th temple in Idaho.
- November 4: Proposition 8 opposing same-sex marriage is passed in the state of California, with noted support from the LDS Church. The church is criticized for its involvement and some church buildings are vandalized in retaliation after the election.
- November 24: The Joseph Smith Papers publishes its first volume, to high demand.
- December 1: LDS apostle Joseph B. Wirthlin dies.

=== 2009 ===
- March: Glenn Beck, a prominent conservative political commentator on Fox News and Mormon convert, launches the 9-12 Project along with a new edition of W. Cleon Skousen's 1981 book The 5,000 Year Leap, which becomes the top seller on Amazon.com. Commentators note its relationship to Mormon 1950s anti-communism.
- March 22: Thomas S. Monson dedicates the Draper Utah Temple, the LDS Church's 129th temple.
- April 4: Neil L. Anderson is sustained to the Quorum of the Twelve Apostles.
- June: Aba Nigeria Temple closes due to violence in region.
- August 23: Thomas S. Monson dedicates the Oquirrh Mountain Utah Temple, the LDS Church's 130th temple and 13th temple in Utah.
- September 14: An LDS edition of the Bible is published in Spanish, based on the 1909 version of the Reina-Valera translation.
- September 29: Deseret Digital Media established.
- December: Church College of New Zealand closes.
- Guarani translation of the Book of Mormon.

== 2010s ==
=== 2010 ===
- May 2: Thomas S. Monson dedicates the Vancouver British Columbia Temple, the LDS Church's 131st temple.
- May 23: Thomas S. Monson dedicates the Gila Valley Arizona Temple, the LDS Church's 132nd temple.
- June 13: Thomas S. Monson dedicates the Cebu City Philippines Temple, the LDS Church's 133rd temple.
- June 19: Reunion tour of Mormon Youth Symphony and Chorus.
- July 15: Mormon.org is revamped to showcase profiles of LDS members, which are then highlighted in the new I'm a Mormon media campaign.
- July 28: The Aba Nigeria Temple reopens.
- August 29: Thomas S. Monson dedicates the Kyiv Ukraine Temple, the LDS Church's 134th temple and first in the former Soviet Union.
- September 3: Documentary Tabloid (directed by Errol Morris) released, dealing with the notorious Mormon sex in chains case and British tabloid war.
- September 26: Sister Wives is first broadcast on TLC, a reality show about a polygamous family in Utah.

=== 2011 ===
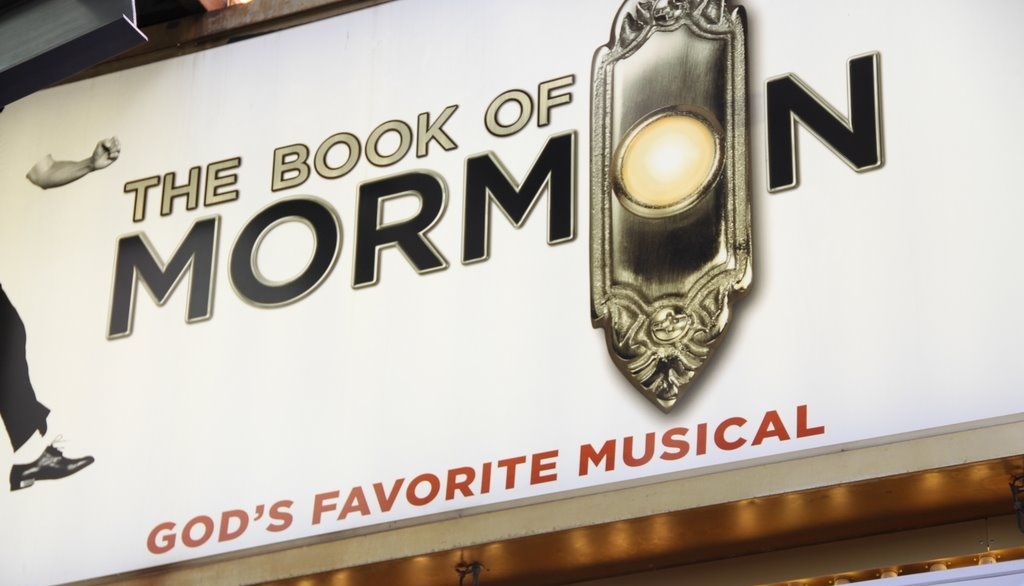
Marquee for The Book of Mormon musical on Broadway.

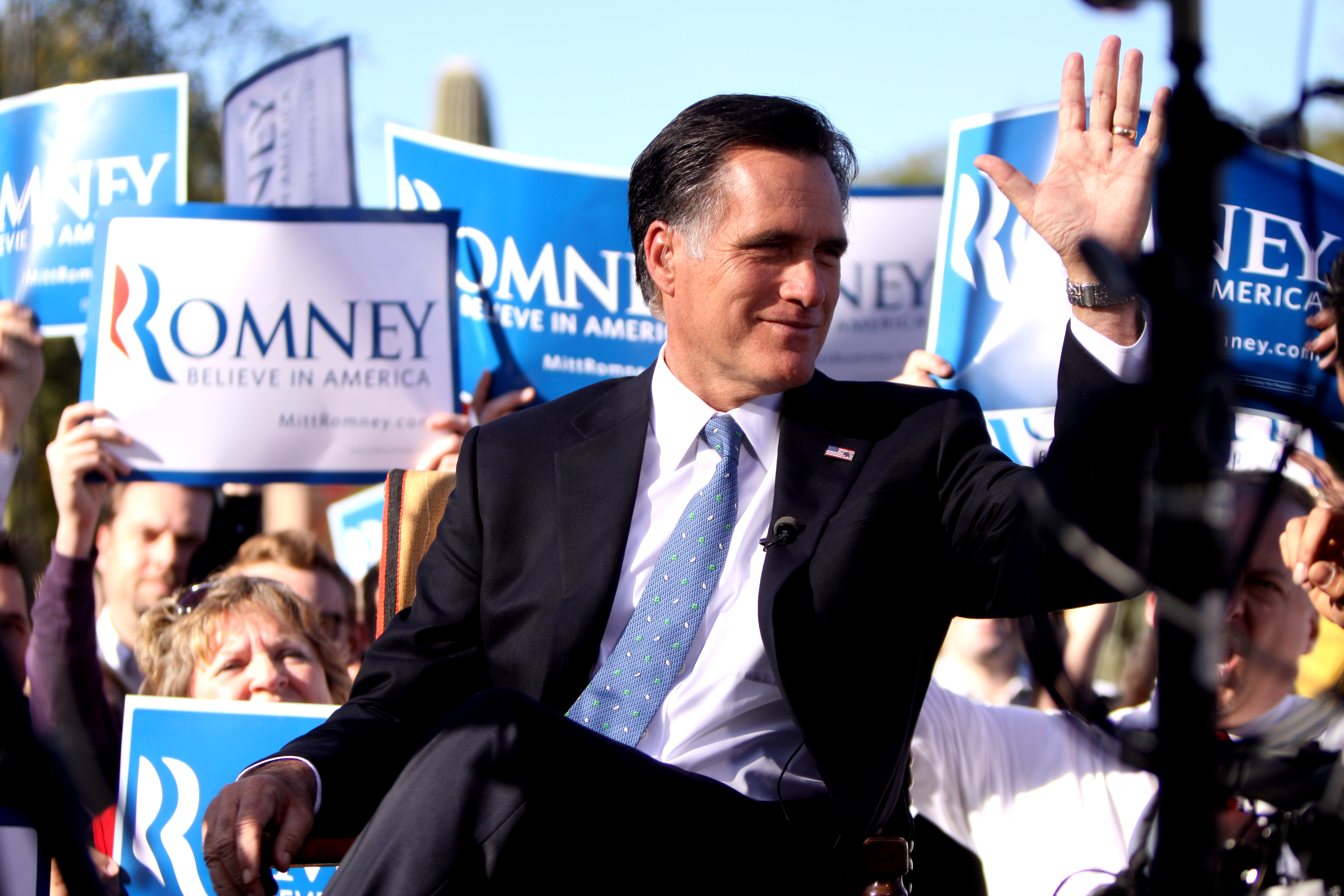
Mitt Romney gives an interview at a supporters rally in Paradise Valley, Arizona.

- March 24: The Book of Mormon musical premiers on Broadway, lampooning the LDS Church and musical theater. Co-written by South Park creators Trey Parker and Matt Stone, who confess a lifelong fascination with Mormonism and with musicals.
- June 2: Mitt Romney announces his candidacy for the 2012 Republican nomination for President of the United States. Having been the runner-up in 2008, his Mormon faith is again the subject of media attention and political discussion.
- June 5: Newsweek declares a "Mormon Moment" in America, citing the prominence of The Book of Mormon Broadway musical, Big Love, Mitt Romney, Jon Huntsman, Harry Reid, Glenn Beck, Stephenie Meyer, and several other famous Mormons.
- June 14: Jon Huntsman, Jr. announces his candidacy for the 2012 Republican nomination, making two prominent Mormons in the U.S. presidential campaign.
- June 16: I'm A Mormon media campaign launches large-scale in New York City, after testing in regional markets.
- August 21: Henry B. Eyring dedicates the San Salvador El Salvador Temple, the LDS Church's 135th temple and 4th temple in Central America.
- December 11: Dieter F. Uchtdorf dedicates the Quetzaltenango Guatemala Temple, the LDS Church's 136th temple and 2nd temple in Guatemala.

=== 2012 ===
- March 22: City Creek Center opens in Salt Lake City, funded by the commercial arm of the LDS Church with some controversy.
- May 6: Thomas S. Monson dedicates the Kansas City Missouri Temple, the LDS Church's 137th temple.
- May 29: Mitt Romney wins the Texas primary, becoming the Republican Party's presumptive nominee.
- June 10: Dieter F. Uchtdorf dedicates the Manaus Brazil Temple, the LDS Church's 138th temple.
- September 23: Boyd K. Packer dedicates the Brigham City Utah Temple, the LDS Church's 139th temple and its 14th temple in Utah.
- October 6: Thomas S. Monson announces a reduction of the minimum missionary age for both males (age 18) and females (age 19).
- October 28: Thomas S. Monson dedicates the Calgary Alberta Temple, the LDS Church's 140th temple.
- November 6: Mitt Romney loses the United States presidential election with 47.2% to Barack Obama's 51.1%.
- December 16: "Wear Pants to Church Day" is promoted by Mormon feminists, causing controversy.

=== 2013 ===
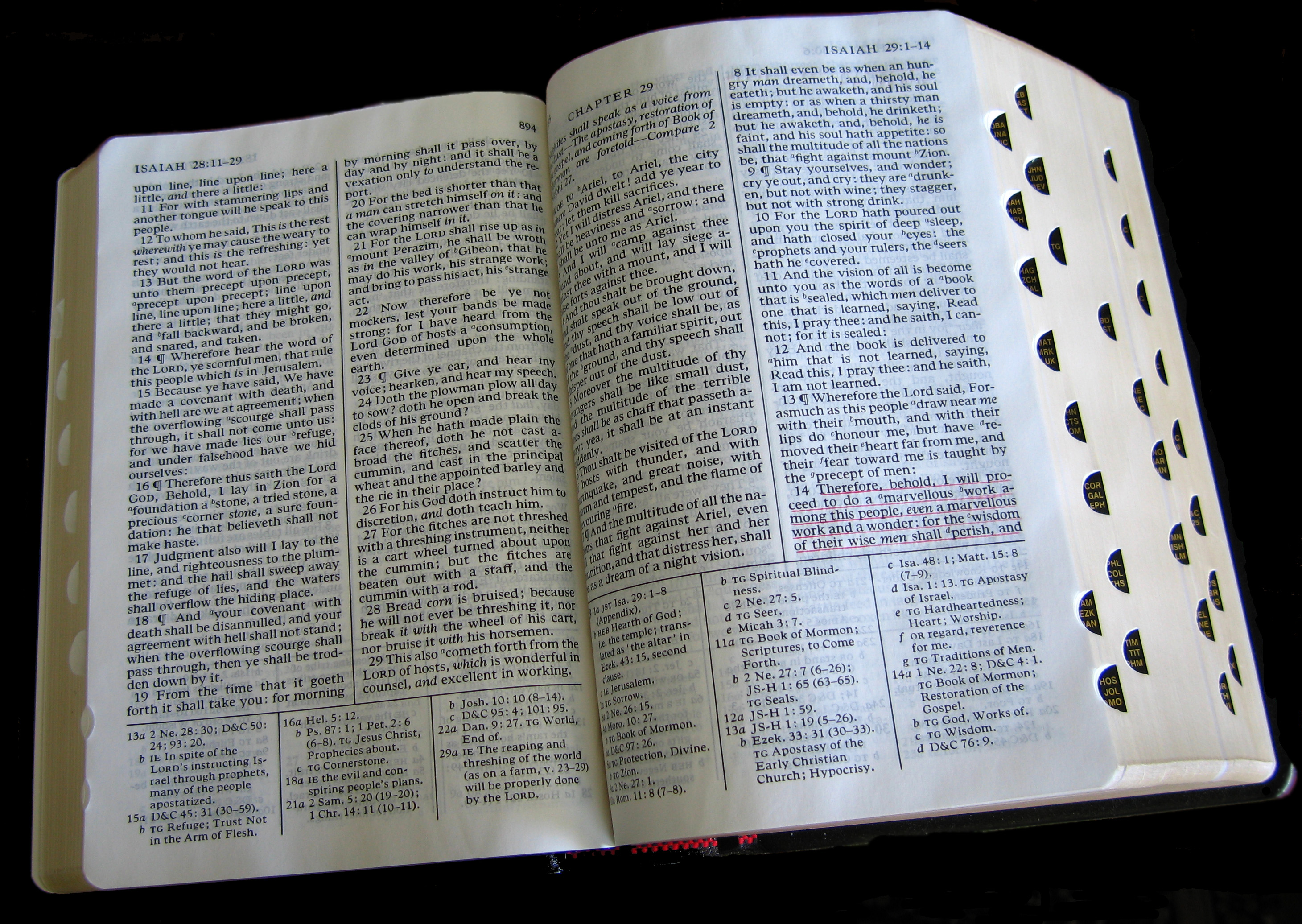
A new edition of the LDS scriptures is published in 2013.

- January 1: New curriculum, called "Come, Follow Me", is used for youth Sunday lessons.
- February 28: A new "2013 edition" of the LDS scriptures is released online, primarily updating study aids, with print editions in August 2013.
- March 17: Dieter F. Uchtdorf dedicates the Tegucigalpa Honduras Temple, the LDS Church's 141st temple.
- April 6: The first prayer given by a woman at General Conference.
- April: The CES Letter, an online document outlining problems with LDS Church teachings, is released and goes on to gain prominence among disaffected church members.
- June 23: LDS missionaries begin online proselyting activities through social media.
- July–August: The British Pageant opens at the Preston England Temple grounds, commemorating LDS history in the British Isles. It is the first such LDS pageant in Europe.
- September: Essays begin to be published to the church's website about controversial gospel topics, such as polygamy, race, violence, and scriptural translation. Following public reaction, some essays were covered in the national media.
- October: The priesthood session of General Conference is broadcast publicly on television for the first time.
- October 9: The Saratov Approach, a film about the kidnapping of two missionaries serving in Russia, is released.

=== 2014 ===
- March 2: Henry B. Eyring dedicates the Gilbert Arizona Temple, the LDS Church's 142nd temple and its fourth temple in Arizona.
- March 14: LDS missionaries are withdrawn from Venezuela and Ukraine amidst civil unrest.
- March 29: The first General Women's Meeting is held for ages 8 and up, replacing annual meetings for the Relief Society and Young Women. The following November this was designated an official session of General Conference.
- May 4: Dieter F. Uchtdorf dedicates the Fort Lauderdale Florida Temple, the LDS Church's 143rd temple and the second LDS temple in Florida.
- June: Kate Kelly and John Dehlin are notified of church discipline for advocacy on certain controversial church issues, among similar reports of others facing discipline. Both would be excommunicated. Some commentators saw this as a crackdown ending the "Mormon Moment".
- October 4: The first non-English talks are delivered to the church's General Conference.
- October 10: Meet the Mormons, a documentary film produced by the LDS Church, debuts in 200 movie theaters nationwide.
- November 16: Thomas S. Monson dedicates the Phoenix Arizona Temple, the LDS Church's 144 temple the fifth LDS temple in Arizona.
- November 17: Henry B. Eyring, L. Tom Perry, and Gérald Caussé participate in an interfaith conference on marriage at the Vatican with Pope Francis.

=== 2015 ===
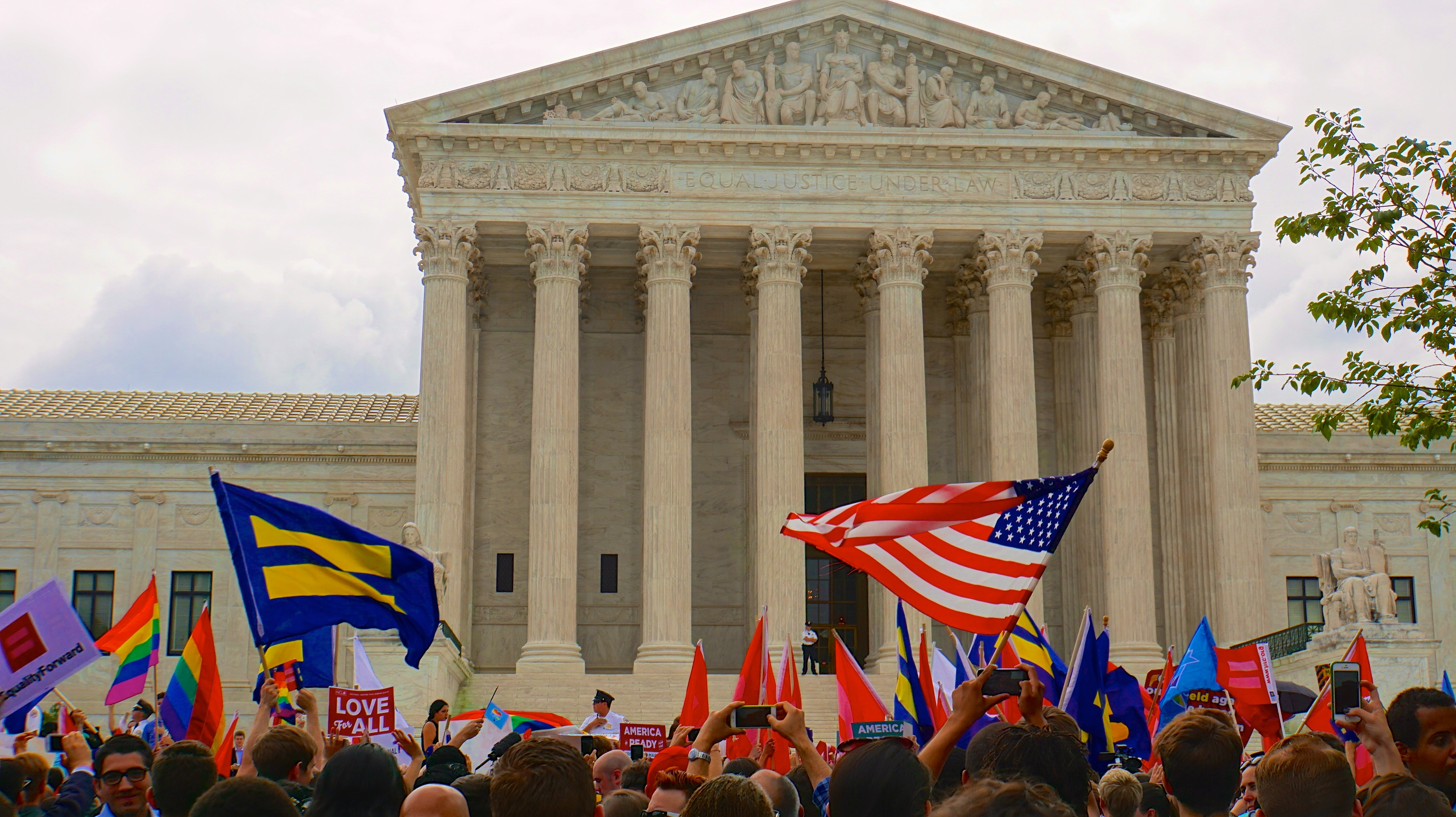
Legalization of same-sex marriage in the United States brings responses from the LDS Church and its leaders.

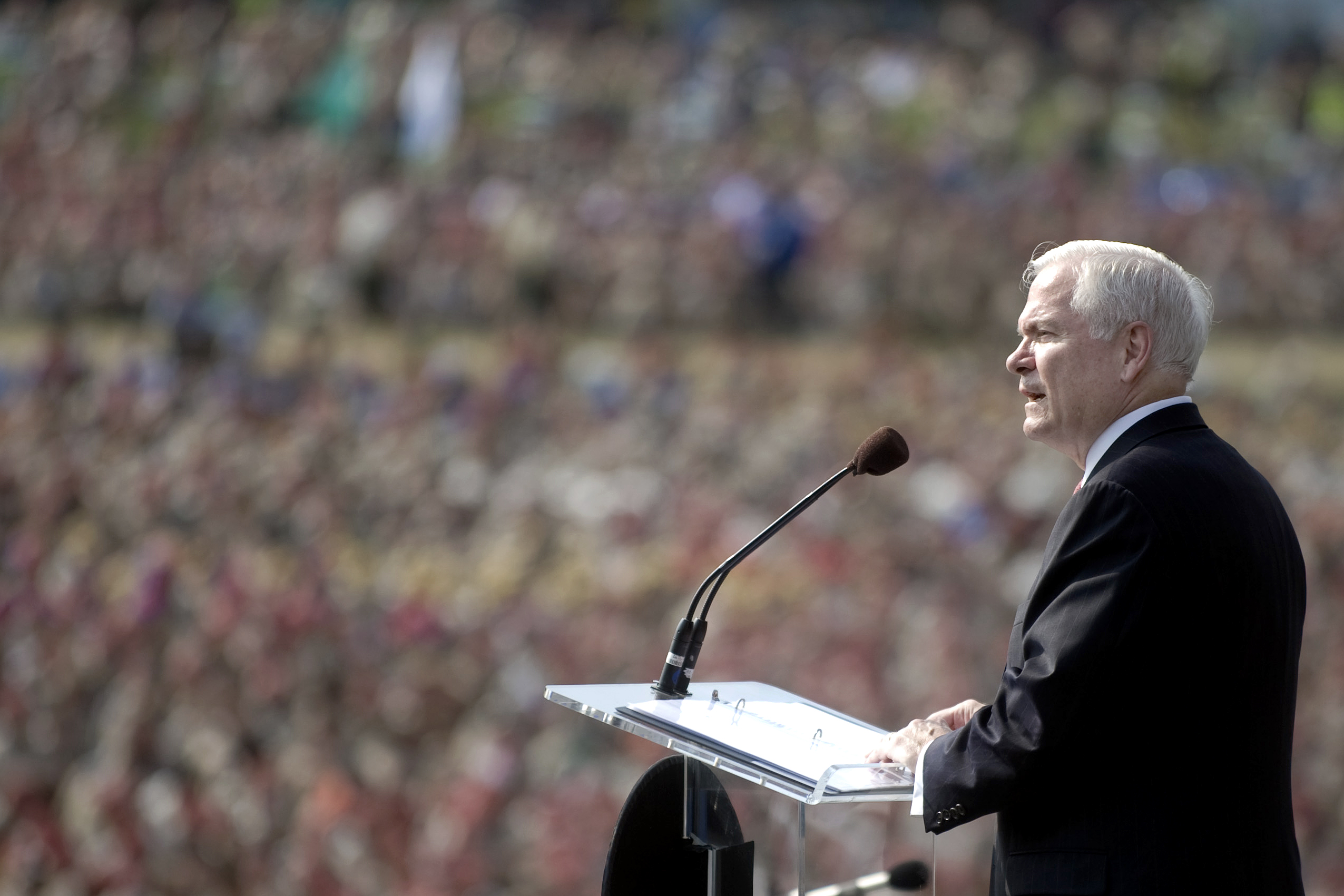
BSA president Robert Gates lifts a ban on gay scout leaders, troubling the LDS Church.

- January 11: The TLC special My Husband's Not Gay features Mormons in mixed-orientation marriages.
- March 4: The "Utah Compromise" is struck between the LDS Church and LGBT advocates, creating a nondiscrimination law in Utah that also includes religious protections.
- May 17: Dieter F. Uchtdorf dedicates the Córdoba Argentina Temple, the LDS Church's 145th temple and Argentina's second LDS temple.
- May 30: L. Tom Perry, a senior LDS apostle, dies of cancer at age 92.
- June 7: Henry B. Eyring dedicates the Payson Utah Temple, the LDS Church's 146th temple.
- June 21: Dieter F. Uchtdorf dedicates the Trujillo Peru Temple, the LDS Church's 147th temple.
- July 3: Boyd K. Packer, President of the Quorum of the Twelve Apostles, dies at age 90.
- July 5: After the gay marriage is legalized in the U.S., LDS Church services read and discuss a letter reaffirming the church's position on marriage and calling for civility.
- July 27: The LDS Church is "deeply troubled" and re-evaluates its scouting program, as the Boy Scouts of America permits openly gay scout leaders.
- August 4: The first photos of Joseph Smith's seer stone are made public by the Joseph Smith Papers Project, along with an Ensign article explaining its use in translating the Book of Mormon.
- August 18: Women are given official positions on three top LDS Church priesthood councils, where they had participated previously only on invitation.
- August 23: Henry B. Eyring dedicates the Indianapolis Indiana Temple, the LDS Church's 148th temple.
- August 26: The LDS Church announces it will stay in the national Boy Scouts of America program, despite concerns over permitting openly gay scout leaders.
- September 22: LDS apostle Richard G. Scott dies at 86, leaving three vacancies in the quorum for the first time since 1906.
- September 27: Some LDS survivalists anticipate cataclysms at a "blood moon" lunar eclipse, based on a vision to Julie Rowe. A church press release distances itself from such "speculation."
- October 3: Ronald A. Rasband, Gary E. Stevenson, and Dale G. Renlund are sustained as new LDS apostles in General Conference.
- October 10: Prophet's Prey premieres on Showtime, an exposé of abuses in the FLDS Church.
- October 20: Dallin H. Oaks publicly disagrees with refusing gay marriages in violation of the recent supreme court ruling. Days later at the World Congress of Families, M. Russell Ballard urges tolerance for the opposition.
- October 23: The last of the Gospel Topics essays are released, with topics on Heavenly Mother and women relative to the Priesthood.
- November 5: New LDS Church policy requires disciplinary council for apostasy for members in same-sex marriages, and children currently living with same-sex couples cannot be baptized, blessed, ordained, or become missionaries before turning 18 and disavowing same-sex marriage. This garners controversy and is criticized by gay rights supporters, including some Mormons. The church states that the policy was a response to recent legalizations of gay marriage, and intended to protect the child's relationships in such families. Another statement adds that restrictions do not apply to children already baptized and active.
- December 13: Dieter F. Uchtdorf dedicates the Tijuana Mexico Temple, the LDS Church's 149th temple.

=== 2016 ===
- January 2: Activists occupy an Oregon wildlife refuge amidst wide media coverage. Ammon Bundy, the leader, and other Mormons involved have religious motives, but this is rejected by the LDS Church. Commentators suggest a political rift among Mormons.
- February 23: FLDS Church leaders in the Short Creek Community are arrested by the FBI and charged with orchestrating food stamp fraud through church-owned business and coaching church members to participate.
- March: An LDS edition of the Bible in Portuguese is printed, based on the 1914 version of the João Ferreira de Almeida translation. The e-book had been released since September.
- March 20: Dallin H. Oaks dedicates the Provo City Center Temple, the 150th LDS temple and the second temple converted from an LDS tabernacle.
- March 26: At General Conference, an outreach effort called "I Was A Stranger" is launched for LDS members to help refugees, at a time when large numbers from the Middle East and Africa were fleeing unrest and seeking entry into Europe.
- April 12: News reports that BYU students who file rape complaints are investigated for honor code violations. After a review, BYU administration will eventually decide to grant Honor Code amnesty to rape victims. The Salt Lake Tribune's coverage of this story wins it the Pulitzer Prize for Local Reporting.
- June: Historically reliable Republican voters, Mormons are reported to dislike the party's candidate, Donald Trump, particularly his morality, rhetoric, and positions against Muslims and immigrants. In Utah's Republican caucus in March, Trump had come in 3rd with 14% of the vote.
- July 19: A day before the Russian government passes anti-terror laws restricting most religious proselyting, the LDS Church promises to comply with these laws and designates missionaries serving in Russia as "volunteers".
- August 21: Russell M. Nelson dedicates the Sapporo Japan Temple, the 151st LDS temple and third temple in Japan.
- September 18: Henry B. Eyring dedicates the Philadelphia Pennsylvania Temple, the 152nd LDS temple.
- December 19: Ryan McKnight launches the website MormonWikiLeaks.com to "promote transparency" in the LDS Church.

=== 2017 ===
- January 8: LDS artist James C. Christensen dies at the age of 74.
- March 2: The LDS Church files a legal notice against MormonLeaks alleging copyright violation of a posted PowerPoint presentation. MormonLeaks later re-posted the presentation.
- April 20: The LDS Church donates $120,000 to South Valley Children's Justice Center.
- May 11: The LDS Church announces it will stop participating in the Varsity and Venturing scouting programs in 2018.
- May 21: Henry B. Eyring dedicates the Paris France Temple, the 156th LDS temple.
- August 8: General Authority Seventy James J. Hamula is excommunicated.
- August 13: Dieter F. Uchtdorf dedicates the Tucson Arizona Temple, the 157th LDS temple and the sixth LDS temple in Arizona.
- August 16: The LDS Church announces its support of Dan Reynolds' LoveLoud Festival, an upcoming music festival in Orem supporting LGBTQ youth.
- September 20: The LDS Church purchases the printer's manuscript of the Book of Mormon from the Community of Christ for $35 million.
- October 1: LDS apostle Robert D. Hales dies at the age of 85.
- October 27: LDS Church announces changes to General Conference. Rather than having both General Priesthood and General Women's Sessions each conference, the General Priesthood session will only occur in April with the General Women's session in October. These sessions will occur on Saturday evening following the Saturday afternoon session.
- November 19: Dieter F. Uchtdorf dedicates the Meridian Idaho Temple, the 158th LDS temple and the fifth LDS temple in Idaho.
- December 10: Henry B. Eyring dedicates the Cedar City Utah Temple, the 159th LDS temple and the seventeenth LDS temple in Utah.
- December 14: Priests in the Aaronic Priesthood are permitted to perform proxy baptisms in LDS temples.

=== 2018 ===
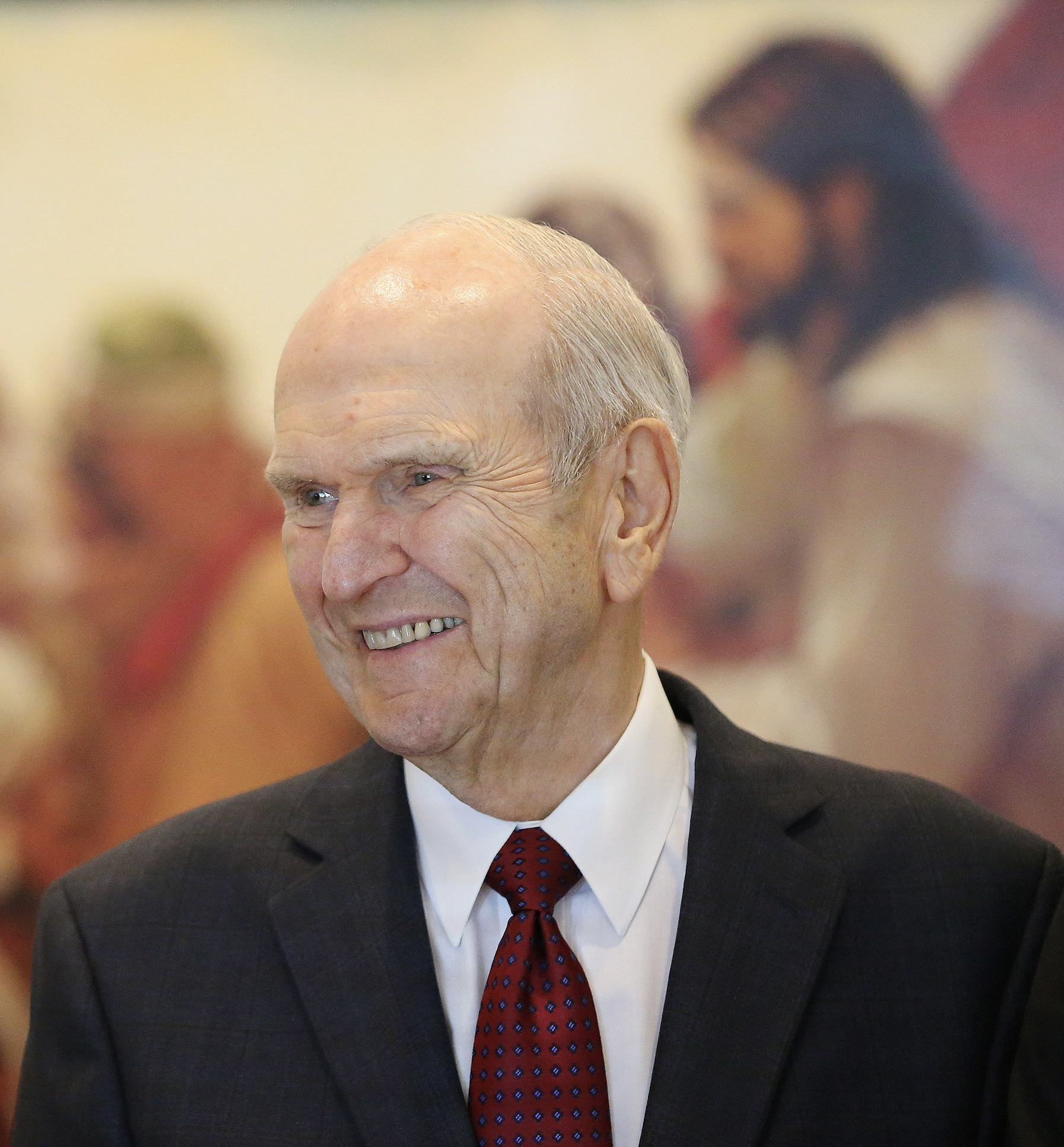
Russell M. Nelson becomes LDS Church president.

- January 2: Thomas S. Monson, the 16th president of the LDS Church, dies at the age of 90.
- January 8: The New York Times obituary of Thomas S. Monson focuses on controversial church issues during his presidency, to the protests of Latter-day Saints, leading to a response article from the Times.
- January 14: Russell M. Nelson is set apart as the 17th President of the Church, with counselors Dallin H. Oaks and Henry B. Eyring. In a rare move, Dieter F. Uchtdorf is not retained as a counselor.
- January 18: An online petition with 11,000 signatures asks to remove sexual questions from youth worthiness interviews given by LDS bishops. In June, the church clarifies that parents may accompany their youth in interviews.
- March 19: The Ensign announces the discontinuation of the monthly First Presidency Message, with the last one being in April's issue.
- March 21: A former MTC president is accused of sexual assault by a female missionary during his term in the 1980s. In a taped interview, he makes some corroborating admissions.
- May 30: Research into LDS Church private investments are released online by MormonLeaks, suggesting over $32 billion of holdings.
- March 31-April 1: General Conference brings new milestones:
  - Gerrit W. Gong and Ulisses Soares are sustained as apostles, the first to be Asian-American and South American.
  - High Priest Quorums are now reserved for certain leaders, with all other High Priests transferred into their local Elders Quorums.
  - Home Teaching and Visiting Teaching are replaced with Ministering.
  - New temples will be planned for India and Russia.
- April 12: Russell M. Nelson, still early in his presidency, undertakes a world tour to England, Israel, Kenya, Zimbabwe, India, Thailand, China and throughout the Americas.
- May 9: The LDS Church announces that in 2020 a new youth program will replace its long-standing involvement with the Boy Scouts of America.
- June 1: Music and preaching at the 'Be One' celebration marks 40 years since the end of the priesthood and temple ban on black Latter-day Saints.
- June 18: The LDS Church created committees tasked with forming a unified hymnbook and children's songbook for the church. The intent of this project was to allow each language edition to have the same songs in the same order. The church allowed submissions for new hymns from the membership of the church until July 2019.
- August: As midterm congressional elections approach, Latter-day Saint dislike of Donald Trump is reported to reduce their support for conservative candidates. A post-election survey in November confirms lower support for Trump.
- August 18: The LDS Church asks that all refer to it by its full name, and stop using nicknames including Mormon or LDS.
- August 23: The LDS Church campaigns against a Utah ballot initiative for medical marijuana, and urges members to vote against it. The church later backs a compromise bill, but the ballot initiative passes in November.
- September 4: The LDS Church publishes the first volume of Saints, a narrative history that uses current scholarship and covers some historical controversies.
- October 5: The Mormon Tabernacle Choir's name is changed to the Tabernacle Choir at Temple Square, following the new church policy to avoid the name Mormon.
- October 6-7: General Conference brings new milestones:
  - Latter-day Saint Sunday worship meetings are changed to a 2-hour block, replacing the 3-hour block introduced in 1980.
  - The Women's Session is incorporated into the 2-day schedule for General Conferences held in October, alternating its timeslot with the Priesthood Session in April.
  - Twelve new temples are announced.
- October 27: The LDS Church re-evaluates its pageants, later deciding to end four of them, including the Hill Cumorah Pageant, the Mormon Miracle Pageant.
- November 6: In midterm elections Mitt Romney is elected United States Senator in Utah, but the number of Latter-day Saints in congress drops to a 30-year low.
- December 14: LDS youth advance to their next older classes and quorums in the January before their 12, 14, or 16-year-old birthdays, instead of on their actual birthdays.

=== 2019 ===
- January 2: The Latter-day Saint temple endowment ceremony is adjusted, introducing changes seen as more inclusive to women.

== See also ==
- Mormonism in the 19th century
- Mormonism in the 20th century

== Sources ==
- Bitton, Davis; Alexander, Thomas G. (2009), The A to Z of Mormonism, Scarecrow Press, ISBN 9780810870604
