= Restoration (Mormonism) =

Doctrine in the Latter Day Saint movement

In Mormonism, the restoration refers to a return of the authentic priesthood power, spiritual gifts, ordinances, living prophets and revelation of the primitive Church of Christ after a long period of apostasy. While in some contexts the term may also refer to the early history of Mormonism, in other contexts the term is used in a way to include the time that has elapsed from the church's earliest beginnings until the present day. Especially in the Church of Jesus Christ of Latter-day Saints (LDS Church) "the restoration" is often used also as a term to encompass the corpus of religious messages from its general leaders down to the present.

The restoration is associated with a number of events that occurred which are understood to have been necessary to re-establish the early Christian church found in the New Testament, and to prepare the earth for the Second Coming of Jesus. In particular, Latter Day Saints believe that angels appeared to Joseph Smith and others and bestowed various priesthood authorities on them.

== Apostasy ==
According to the LDS Church, the Great Apostasy in Christianity began not long after the ascension of Jesus Christ. It was marked with the corruption of Christian doctrine by Greek and other philosophies, with followers dividing into different ideological groups, and the martyrdom of the apostles which led to a loss of priesthood authority to administer the church and its ordinances.

With all priesthood authorities either martyred, taken from the earth, or teaching impure doctrines, there was a break in apostolic succession, and what remained was a mere fragment of the church established by Jesus. The Christian believers who survived the persecutions took it upon themselves to speak for God, interpret, amend or add to his doctrines and ordinances, and carry out his work without proper authority and divine direction from God. During this time, important doctrines and rites were lost or corrupted. Latter-day Saints specifically reject the early ecumenical councils for what they see as misguided human attempts to decide matters of doctrine without divine assistance, substituting debate and politics for divine revelation.

Latter-day Saints have said that various Old Testament and New Testament scriptures, including teachings of Christ himself, prophesy of this "falling away" or "apostasy." Thus, Latter-day Saints refer to the "restitution of all things" mentioned in Acts 3:20–21 and claim that a restoration of all the original and primary doctrines and rites of Christianity was necessary. Adherents believe that important historical events such as the Protestant Reformation and the establishment of the United States Constitution, which explicitly allows for freedom of religion in its First Amendment, were necessary antecedents to the restoration.

Scholars today view the Latter Day Saint movement as emerging from the spiritual fervor of the restorationism movements spawned by the Second Great Awakening.

== Restoration of the Gospel ==
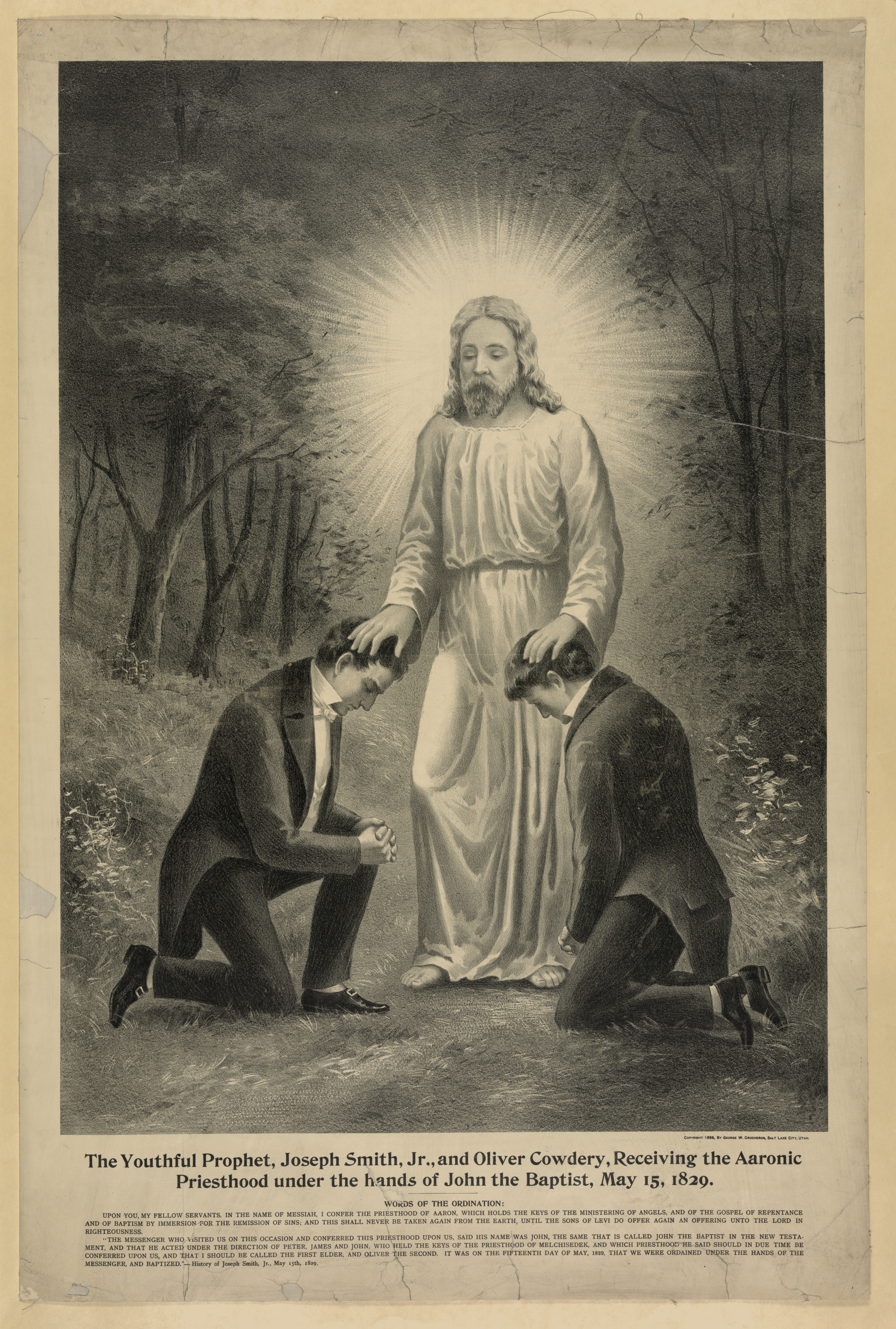
A 19th-century drawing of Joseph Smith and Oliver Cowdery receiving the Aaronic priesthood from John the Baptist.

Joseph Smith, founder of the Latter Day Saint movement who was responsible for organizing the Church of Christ, originally prayed about which church to join. In a vision in 1820 near Palmyra, New York, two personages (God the Father and Jesus Christ) instructed him not to join any churches, for "all their creeds were an abomination." Smith described another vision in 1823 as being visited in his bedroom by an "angel Moroni", who told him of a record of an ancient people written in an ancient language on golden plates. After repeated visits by this angel in successive years, Smith described receiving and translating this ancient record and publishing the translation as the Book of Mormon. The Book of Mormon provided many teachings about the atonement of Christ that were not as clear in the Bible, as also teachings about the House of Israel and the baptismal covenant. When Smith prayed in May 1829 about the need for baptism, he and Oliver Cowdery were visited by the resurrected John the Baptist, who by the laying on of hands gave them priesthood authority to baptize.

Coinciding with the restoration of the priesthood, Mormons believe that Smith received many revelations, visions, and visitations of heavenly messengers to instruct him in order to enable him to fulfill his responsibilities in propounding doctrine and re-establishing ordinances and temple covenants. These instructions came to Smith often in response to specific questions he asked in prayer. The majority of this history is recorded in one of the standard works, the Doctrine and Covenants. Additional details and background of the church in Smith's era is presented in the church's seven volume History of the Church.

In regard to the restoration of priesthood authority, Smith dictated the following passage found in Doctrine and Covenants 128:20–21:

And again, what do we hear?...The voice of Peter, James, and John in the wilderness between Harmony, Susquehanna county, and Colesville, Broome county, on the Susquehanna river, declaring themselves as possessing the keys of the kingdom, and of the dispensation of the fulness of times! And again, the voice of God in the chamber of old Father Whitmer, in Fayette, Seneca county, and at sundry times, and in divers places through all the travels and tribulations of this Church of Jesus Christ of Latter-day Saints! And the voice of Michael, the archangel; the voice of Gabriel, and of Raphael, and of divers angels, from Michael or Adam down to the present time, all declaring their dispensation, their rights, their keys, their honors, their majesty and glory, and the power of their priesthood; giving line upon line, precept upon precept; here a little, and there a little; giving us consolation by holding forth that which is to come, confirming our hope!

In reflecting upon the responsibilities of teaching the constant revelations he received, Smith stated:

It is my meditation all the day, and more than my meat and drink, to know how I shall make the Saints of God comprehend the visions that roll like an overflowing surge before my mind.

=== Personages who appeared to Joseph Smith ===
As part of the process of the restoration, Joseph Smith stated that a number of personages appeared to him to deliver messages, priesthood authority, or other instruction from God. These personages appeared either as resurrected beings or as translated beings. According to H. Donl Peterson, the following 50 personages appeared to Smith:

#	Personage	References
1	God the Father	JS–H 1:17; HC 1:5; D&C 76:20
2	Jesus Christ	JS–H 1:17; HC 1:5–6; D&C 76:20–24, 110:2–10
3	Moroni	JS–H 1:30–49; JD 17:374
4	Elijah	D&C 110:13–16; JD 23:48
5	John the Baptist	D&C 13; HC 1:39–40
6–8	Peter, James, John	D&C 128:20; HC 1:40–42; JD 18:326
9	Adam (Michael)	HC 3:388; D&C 107:53–57, 128:21; HC 2:380; JD 9:41, 18:326, 21:94, 23:48
10	Noah (Gabriel)	D&C 128:21; JD 21:94, 23:48
11	Raphael	D&C 128:21
12	Moses	D&C 110:11; JD 21:65, 23:48
13	Elias	D&C 110:12; JD 23:48
14	Abraham	JD 21:94, 23:48
15	Isaac	JD 21:94
16	Jacob	JD 21:94
17	Enoch	JD 21:65, 94; HC 3:388; D&C 107:53–57
18–26	The Twelve Jewish Apostles (Peter, James, and John counted above)	JD 21:94
27–38	The Twelve Nephite Disciples (including the Three Nephites)	JD 21:94
39	Nephi	JD 21:161
40	Seth	JD 21:94; HC 3:388; D&C 107:53–57
41	Methuselah	JD 18:325; HC 3:388; D&C 107:53–57
42	Enos	JD 18:325; HC 3:388; D&C 107:53–57
43	Mahalaleel	JD 18:325; HC 3:388; D&C 107:53–57
44	Jared	HC 3:388; D&C 107:53–57
45	Lamech	JD 18:325
46	Abel	JD 18:325; HC 3:388
47	Cainan	HC 3:388; D&C 107:53–57
48	Zelph the Lamanite	TS 6:788
49	Alvin Smith	HC 2:380
50	Mormon	JD 17:374

== Significance and impact of the Restoration ==
According to the LDS Church, all priesthood keys necessary to administer Jesus' church were given to Joseph Smith, who re-organized that church, which will continue in perpetuity. Hence, members refer to their church as "The Church of Jesus Christ." The term "Latter-day Saints" refers to the fact that members of early Christianity were originally called "saints", and the church reestablished by Smith is believed to be Christ's church in the last days prior to the second coming of Jesus. Members of the church do not use the term to indicate they are better than others in any way, but rather that they are striving to follow Jesus Christ in their personal daily walks of life.

Members of the church believe that the restored church of Jesus Christ is the "only true and living church upon the face of the Earth" because of the divine authority restored through Joseph Smith. They believe that the church is the restoration of Jesus' original church, has the authentic priesthood authority, and all doctrines and ordinances of the gospel, fulfilling many of the prophecies of Daniel, Isaiah, Ezekiel, and Malachi in the Old Testament and also the prophesies of Peter, Jesus, and John the Revelator in the New Testament.

Members of the LDS Church maintain that other religions have a portion of the truth, mingled with inaccuracies. They also maintain that many other religions advance many good causes and do much good among the people insofar as they are led by the light of Christ, "which lighteth every man that cometh into the world" (John 1:9). The Church of Jesus Christ maintains an international humanitarian program and strives to "do good unto all men" (Galatians 6:10). The Book of Mormon: Another Testament of Jesus Christ, which faithful members of the Church believe is one of the keystones of their religion, and are encouraged to read it along with the Bible, teaches that "all men are alike unto God" and that "When ye are in the service of your fellow beings ye are only in the service of your God (Mosiah 2:17)".

Missionaries of the LDS Church challenge all people everywhere to read the book for themselves, and pray to God to know if it is true. They believe that the validity of the Book of Mormon is interconnected with the validity of the church: if the Book of Mormon is true, then the church is true, and all people everywhere should seek this knowledge for themselves (Moroni 10:3-5). Members of the church believe that after one gains a knowledge of the truthfulness of the Book of Mormon, one should be baptized a member of the church to follow the example that Jesus Christ has sent.

== See also ==
- Mormonism and Nicene Christianity
- "The Restoration of the Fulness of the Gospel of Jesus Christ"
