= Dispensation of the fulness of times =

Christian eschatological doctrine

In Christianity, the dispensation (or administration) of the fulness of times is thought to be a world order or administration in which the heavens and the earth are under the political and/or spiritual government of Jesus. The phrase is derived from a passage in Ephesians 1:10 (KJV), which reads: "That in the dispensation of the fulness of times he might gather together in one all things in Christ, both which are in heaven, and which are on earth; even in him."

== History ==
The term "fulness of times" was designated as a specific period in the latter days by a variety of theologians, pastors and writers in the 19th and early 20th centuries. Jonathan Edwards equated the term with the eternal state. Charles Taze Russell (1852–1916) considered the fulness of times to consist of the millennial age as well as the "ages to come". George Soltau, a dispensationalist, placed the "dispensation of the fulness of times" after the millennial age. And Joseph Smith, founder of the Church of Jesus Christ of Latter-day Saints, placed its beginning in 1830, with the Restoration of the Gospel of antiquity.

== Analysis ==
John Nelson Darby held a formidable body of doctrine on the subject of the biblical significance of the dispensation of the fulness of times. Darby's literal translation of Ephesians 1:10 is: "Having made known unto us the mystery of his will, according to his good pleasure which he hath purposed in himself for the administration of the fulness of times, [namely] to head up all things in Christ, the things in heaven and the things on earth, in Him in whom also we have an inheritance," (from Darby Bible).

According to some postmillennialists, the dispensation of the fulness of times is thought to take place prior to the Second Coming of Jesus. Likewise, in the Latter Day Saint movement, the dispensation of the fulness of times is often interpreted as the era after which the Church of Christ is said to have been restored to the earth by the religion's founder Joseph Smith on April 6, 1830. In this sense, the "dispensation" refers to the administration of truth and/or priesthood by the church and its leaders, guided by revelation.

This being so, the term also appears in Galatians 4:4 where it is used in the singular form ["fulness of time"] to describe Christ's first coming at the meridian of time. In light of Daniel's "time, times and a half" (Daniel 4:25, 7:25, 9:24–27 and 12:7) these then seem to point to two different though indirectly related events, Christ's first coming seen as one event leading to the concluding event encompassing all other 'times' when the King of Kings is enthroned. The apostle John spoke of this "last time" (1 John 2:18) and warned of the expected anti-Christ (1 John 2:18) seen by the apostle as in the Book of Revelation. Here he sees these 'times' as chapters of a book whereby the time preceding the opening the fifth seal would be the time spoken of in Galatians.

== See also ==
- Christian eschatology
- New world order (Baháʼí)
- Summary of Christian eschatological differences
- World to Come
