= List of missions (LDS Church) =

The Church of Jesus Christ of Latter-day Saints (LDS Church) operates 451 missions throughout the world, as of December 2025. Most are named after the location of the mission headquarters, usually a specific city. The geographical area a mission actually covers is typically much larger than the name may indicate; most areas of the world are within the jurisdiction of a mission of the church. In the list below, if the name of the mission does not include a specific city, the city where the mission headquarters is located is included in parentheses. On October 24, 2025, the church announced that an additional 55 missions would be created as of July 1, 2026, which will bring the overall total to 506.

List of Tables
| List | Description |
|---|---|
| By country/territory | List of missions in each country/territory |
| By continent | List missions by continent. |
| By date of formation | List missions by date of formation with other information listed |
| By Area (LDS Church) | Missions listed for each LDS Church Area |

== By continent ==
=== Africa === (71 missions)
| Angola Luanda Mission; Angola Luanda North Mission; Benin Cotonou Mission; Botswana/Namibia Mission; Cameroon Yaounde Mission; Cape Verde Praia Mission; Cape Verde Mindelo Mission; Côte d'Ivoire Abidjan East Mission; Côte d'Ivoire Abidjan North Mission; Côte d'Ivoire Abidjan South Mission; Côte d'Ivoire Abidjan West Mission; Côte d'Ivoire Daloa Mission; Côte d'Ivoire Yamoussoukro Mission; DRC Kananga Mission; DRC Kinshasa East Mission; DRC Kinshasa North Mission; DRC Kinshasa South Mission; DRC Kinshasa West Mission; DRC Kolwezi Mission; DRC Lubumbashi Mission; DRC Mbuji-Mayi Mission; DRC Mwene-Ditu; Ethiopia Addis Ababa Mission; Ghana Accra Mission | Ghana Accra North Mission; Ghana Accra South Mission; Ghana Accra West Mission; Ghana Cape Coast Mission; Ghana Kumasi Mission; Ghana Sunyani Mission; Ghana Takoradi Mission; Kenya Nairobi East Mission; Kenya Nairobi West Mission; Kenya Kisumu Mission; Liberia Monrovia East Mission; Liberia Monrovia West Mission; Madagascar Antananarivo Mission; Madagascar Antananarivo North Mission; Malawi Lilongwe Mission; Mozambique Beira Mission; Mozambique Maputo Mission; Mozambique Nampula Mission; Nigeria Aba Mission; Nigeria Abuja Mission; Nigeria Benin City Mission; Nigeria Calabar Mission; Nigeria Enugu Mission; Nigeria Ibadan Mission | Nigeria Lagos Mission; Nigeria Owerri Mission; Nigeria Port Harcourt North Mission; Nigeria Port Harcourt South Mission; Nigeria Uyo Mission; Republic of the Congo Brazzaville Mission; Rwanda Kigali Mission; Senegal Dakar Mission; Sierra Leone Bo Mission; Sierra Leone Freetown Mission; South Africa Cape Town Mission; South Africa Durban Mission; South Africa East London Mission; South Africa Johannesburg Mission; South Africa Pretoria Mission; Tanzania Dar es Salaam Mission; Togo Lomé Mission; Uganda Kampala East Mission; Uganda Kampala West Mission; Zambia Lusaka Mission; Zimbabwe Bulawayo Mission; Zimbabwe Harare East Mission; Zimbabwe Harare West Mission |

=== Asia === (24 missions)
| Cambodia Phnom Penh West Mission; Cambodia Phnom Penh East Mission; China Hong Kong Mission; India Bengaluru Mission; India New Delhi Mission; Indonesia Jakarta Mission; Japan Fukuoka Mission; Japan Kobe Mission | Japan Nagoya Mission; Japan Sapporo Mission; Japan Sendai Mission; Japan Tokyo North Mission; Japan Tokyo South Mission; Korea Busan Mission; Korea Seoul Mission; Korea Seoul South Mission | Mongolia Ulaanbaatar East Mission; Mongolia Ulaanbaatar West Mission; Singapore Mission; Taiwan Kaohsiung Mission; Taiwan Taipei Mission; Thailand Bangkok Mission; Thailand Bangkok East Mission; Vietnam Hanoi Mission |

==== Philippines ==== (31 missions)
| Philippines Antipolo Mission; Philippines Angeles Mission; Philippines Bacolod Mission; Philippines Baguio Mission; Philippines Butuan Mission; Philippines Cabanatuan Mission; Philippines Cagayan de Oro Mission; Philippines Cauayan Mission; Philippines Cavite Mission; Philippines Cebu Mission; Philippines Cebu East Mission | Philippines Davao Mission; Philippines Dumaguete Mission; Philippines General Santos Mission; Philippines Iloilo Mission; Philippines Laoag Mission; Philippines Legazpi Mission; Philippines Lingayen Mission; Philippines Lipa Mission; Philippines Manila Mission; Philippines Naga Mission | Philippines Olongapo Mission; Philippines Ormoc Mission; Philippines Ozamiz Mission; Philippines Puerto Princesa Mission; Philippines Quezon City Mission; Philippines Quezon City North Mission; Philippines San Pablo Mission; Philippines Tacloban Mission; Philippines Tuguegarao Mission; Philippines Urdaneta Mission |

=== Europe and Russia === (42 missions)
| Adriatic North Mission (Zagreb); Albania Tirana Mission; Alpine German-Speaking Mission (Munich); Armenia/Georgia Mission (Yerevan); Baltic Mission (Riga); Belgium/Netherlands Mission (Leiden); Bulgaria Sofia Mission; Czech/Slovak Mission (Prague); Denmark Copenhagen Mission; England Birmingham Mission; England Bristol Mission; England Leeds Mission; England London Mission; England Manchester Mission | Europe Central Turkic and Persian Speaking Mission; Finland Helsinki Mission; France Lyon Mission; France Paris North Mission; France Paris South Mission; Germany Berlin Mission; Germany Frankfurt Mission; Germany Hamburg Mission; Greece Athens Mission; Hungary Budapest Mission; Italy Milan Mission; Italy Rome Mission; Norway Oslo Mission; Poland Warsaw Mission | Portugal Lisbon Mission; Portugal Porto Mission; Romania Bucharest Mission; Russia Moscow Mission; Russia Novosibirsk Mission; Russia Yekaterinburg Mission; Scotland/Ireland Mission (Edinburgh); Spain Barcelona Mission; Spain Madrid East Mission; Spain Madrid North Mission; Spain Madrid South Mission; Sweden Stockholm Mission; Ukraine Dnipro Mission; Ukraine Kyiv/Moldova Mission |

=== North America ===
==== Canada ==== (8 missions)
| Canada Calgary Mission; Canada Edmonton Mission; Canada Halifax Mission | Canada Montreal Mission; Canada Toronto East Mission; Canada Toronto West Mission | Canada Vancouver Mission; Canada Winnipeg Mission |

==== Caribbean ==== (8 missions)
| Barbados Bridgetown Mission; Dominican Republic Santiago Mission; Dominican Republic Santo Domingo East Mission | Dominican Republic Santo Domingo North Mission; Dominican Republic Santo Domingo West Mission; Haiti Port-au-Prince Mission | Jamaica Kingston Mission; Puerto Rico San Juan Mission |

==== Central America ==== (19 missions)
| Costa Rica San José East Mission; Costa Rica San José West Mission; El Salvador San Salvador West Mission; El Salvador San Salvador East Mission; El Salvador Santa Ana Mission; Guatemala Antigua Mission; Guatemala Cobán/Belize Mission | Guatemala Guatemala City Central Mission; Guatemala Guatemala City East Mission; Guatemala Guatemala City South Mission; Guatemala Quetzaltenango Mission; Guatemala Retalhuleu Mission; Honduras Comayaguela Mission | Honduras San Pedro Sula East Mission; Honduras San Pedro Sula West Mission; Honduras Tegucigalpa Mission; Nicaragua Managua North Mission; Nicaragua Managua South Mission; Panama Panama City Mission |

==== Mexico ==== (35 missions)
| Mexico Aguascalientes Mission; Mexico Cancún Mission; Mexico Chihuahua Mission; Mexico Ciudad Juárez Mission; Mexico Cuautla Mission; Mexico Cuernavaca Mission; Mexico Culiacán Mission; Mexico Guadalajara Mission; Mexico Guadalajara East Mission; Mexico Hermosillo Mission; Mexico Mérida Mission; Mexico Mexicali Mission | Mexico Mexico City East Mission; Mexico Mexico City North Mission; Mexico Mexico City Northwest Mission; Mexico Mexico City South Mission; Mexico Mexico City Southeast Mission; Mexico Mexico City West Mission; Mexico Monterrey East Mission; Mexico Monterrey West Mission; Mexico Oaxaca Mission; Mexico Pachuca Mission; Mexico Puebla East Mission; Mexico Puebla North Mission | Mexico Puebla South Mission; Mexico Querétaro Mission; Mexico Saltillo Mission; Mexico Tampico Mission; Mexico Tijuana Mission; Mexico Torreón Mission; Mexico Tula Mission; Mexico Tuxtla Gutiérrez Mission; Mexico Veracruz Mission; Mexico Villahermosa Mission; Mexico Xalapa Mission |

==== United States ==== (134 missions)
| Alabama Birmingham Mission; Alaska Anchorage Mission; Arizona Flagstaff Mission; Arizona Gilbert Mission; Arizona Mesa Mission; Arizona Phoenix East Mission; Arizona Phoenix West Mission; Arizona Tempe Mission; Arizona Tucson Mission; Arkansas Bentonville Mission; Arkansas Little Rock Mission; California Anaheim Mission; California Arcadia Mission; California Bakersfield Mission; California Carlsbad Mission; California Fresno Mission; California Los Angeles Mission; California Modesto Mission; California Newport Beach Mission; California Oakland/San Francisco Mission; California Ontario Mission; California Riverside Mission; California Roseville Mission; California Sacramento Mission; California San Bernardino Mission; California San Diego Mission; California San Jose Mission; California Santa Rosa Mission; California Ventura Mission; California Victorville Mission; Colorado Colorado Springs Mission; Colorado Denver East Mission; Colorado Denver West Mission; Colorado Fort Collins Mission; Florida Fort Lauderdale Mission; Florida Jacksonville Mission; Florida Orlando Mission; Florida Tallahassee Mission; Florida Tampa Mission; Georgia Atlanta Mission; Georgia Atlanta North Mission; Hawaii Honolulu Mission; Hawaii Laie Mission; Idaho Boise Mission; Idaho Coeur d’Alene Mission | Idaho Idaho Falls Mission; Idaho Pocatello Mission; Illinois Chicago Mission; Indiana Fort Wayne Mission; Indiana Indianapolis Mission; Iowa Iowa City Mission; Kansas Wichita Mission; Kentucky Louisville Mission; Louisiana Baton Rouge Mission; Maryland Baltimore Mission; Massachusetts Boston Mission; Michigan Detroit Mission; Michigan Lansing Mission; Minnesota Minneapolis Mission; Mississippi Jackson Mission; Missouri Independence Mission; Missouri Kansas City Mission; Missouri St. Louis Mission; Montana Billings Mission; Montana Missoula Mission; Nebraska Omaha Mission; Nevada Henderson Mission; Nevada Las Vegas Mission; Nevada Las Vegas West Mission; Nevada Reno Mission; New Hampshire Manchester Mission; New Jersey Morristown Mission; New Mexico Albuquerque Mission; New Mexico Farmington Mission; New York New York City Mission; New York Syracuse Mission; North Carolina Charlotte Mission; North Carolina Raleigh Mission; North Dakota Bismarck Mission; Ohio Cincinnati Mission; Ohio Columbus Mission; Oklahoma Oklahoma City Mission; Oklahoma Tulsa Mission; Oregon Eugene Mission; Oregon Portland Mission; Oregon Salem Mission; Pennsylvania Philadelphia Mission; Pennsylvania Pittsburgh Mission; South Carolina Charleston Mission; South Carolina Columbia Mission | Tennessee Knoxville Mission; Tennessee Nashville Mission; Texas Austin Mission; Texas Dallas East Mission; Texas Dallas North Mission; Texas Dallas South Mission; Texas Dallas West Mission; Texas El Paso Mission; Texas Fort Worth Mission; Texas Houston East Mission; Texas Houston North Mission; Texas Houston South Mission; Texas Houston West Mission; Texas Lubbock Mission; Texas McAllen Mission; Texas San Antonio North Mission; Texas San Antonio South Mission; Utah Layton Mission; Utah Ogden Mission; Utah Orem Mission; Utah Provo Mission; Utah Salt Lake City Mission; Utah Salt Lake City Headquarters Mission; Utah Salt Lake City East Mission; Utah Salt Lake City West Mission; Utah Salt Lake City South Mission; Utah Salt Lake City Temple Square Mission; Utah Saratoga Springs Mission; Utah Spanish Fork Mission; Utah St. George Mission; Virginia Norfolk Mission; Virginia Richmond Mission; Washington, D.C. North Mission; Washington, D.C. South Mission; Washington Everett Mission; Washington Kennewick Mission; Washington Seattle Mission; Washington Spokane Mission; Washington Tacoma Mission; Washington Vancouver Mission; Washington Yakima Mission; West Virginia Charleston Mission; Wisconsin Milwaukee Mission; Wyoming Cheyenne Mission |

=== Oceania === (17 missions)
| Australia Adelaide Mission; Australia Brisbane North Mission; Australia Brisbane South Mission; Australia Melbourne Mission; Australia Perth Mission; Australia Sydney Mission; Fiji Suva Mission; Marshall Islands /Kiribati Mission | Micronesia Guam Mission; New Zealand Auckland Mission; New Zealand Hamilton Mission; New Zealand Wellington Mission; Papua New Guinea Daru Mission; Papua New Guinea Lae Mission; Papua New Guinea Madang Mission | Papua New Guinea Port Moresby Mission; Samoa Apia East Mission; Samoa Apia West Mission; Solomon Islands Honiara Mission; Tahiti Papeete Mission; Tonga Nukuʻalofa Mission; Vanuatu Port Vila Mission |

=== South America === (71 missions)
| Argentina Bahía Blanca Mission; Argentina Buenos Aires East Mission; Argentina Buenos Aires North Mission; Argentina Buenos Aires South Mission; Argentina Buenos Aires West Mission; Argentina Comodoro Rivadavia Mission; Argentina Córdoba Mission; Argentina Mendoza Mission; Argentina Neuquén Mission; Argentina Resistencia Mission; Argentina Rosario Mission; Argentina Salta Mission; Argentina Santa Fe Mission; Argentina Tucuman Mission; Bolivia Cochabamba Mission; Bolivia Cochabamba South Mission; Bolivia La Paz Mission; Bolivia La Paz El Alto Mission; Bolivia Santa Cruz Mission; Bolivia Santa Cruz North Mission; Chile Antofagasta Mission; Chile Concepción Mission; Chile Concepción South Mission; Chile La Serena Mission | Chile Puerto Montt Mission; Chile Rancagua Mission; Chile Santiago East Mission; Chile Santiago North Mission; Chile Santiago South Mission; Chile Santiago West Mission; Chile Viña del Mar Mission; Colombia Barranquilla Mission; Colombia Bogotá North Mission; Colombia Bogotá South Mission; Colombia Cali Mission; Colombia Medellin Mission; Ecuador Guayaquil East Mission; Ecuador Guayaquil North Mission; Ecuador Guayaquil South Mission; Ecuador Guayaquil West Mission; Ecuador Quito North Mission; Ecuador Quito South Mission; Ecuador Quito West Mission; Guyana Georgetown Mission; Paraguay Asunción East Mission; Paraguay Asunción North Mission; Paraguay Asunción South Mission; Peru Arequipa Mission | Peru Chiclayo Mission; Peru Cusco Mission; Peru Huancayo Mission; Peru Iquitos Mission; Peru Lima Central Mission; Peru Lima East Mission; Peru Lima North Mission; Peru Lima Northeast Mission; Peru Lima Northwest Mission; Peru Lima South Mission; Peru Lima West Mission; Peru Limatambo Mission; Peru Piura Mission; Peru Tacna Mission; Peru Trujillo North Mission; Peru Trujillo South Mission; Uruguay Montevideo East Mission; Uruguay Montevideo West Mission; Uruguay Salto Mission; Venezuela Barcelona Mission; Venezuela Caracas Mission; Venezuela Maracaibo Mission; Venezuela Valencia Mission |

==== Brazil ==== (40 missions)
| Brazil Belém Mission; Brazil Belo Horizonte Mission; Brazil Brasília Mission; Brazil Campinas Mission; Brazil Cuiabá Mission; Brazil Curitiba Mission; Brazil Curitiba South Mission; Brazil Florianópolis Mission; Brazil Fortaleza Mission; Brazil Fortaleza East Mission; Brazil Goiânia Mission; Brazil Guarulhos Mission; Brazil João Pessoa Mission; Brazil Juiz de Fora Mission | Brazil Londrina Mission; Brazil Maceió Mission; Brazil Manaus Mission; Brazil Manaus South Mission; Brazil Natal Mission; Brazil Piracicaba Mission; Brazil Porto Alegre North Mission; Brazil Porto Alegre South Mission; Brazil Recife Mission; Brazil Recife South Mission; Brazil Ribeirão Preto Mission; Brazil Rio de Janeiro North Mission; Brazil Rio de Janeiro South Mission | Brazil Salvador Mission; Brazil Salvador South Mission; Brazil Santa Maria Mission; Brazil Santos Mission; Brazil São Bernardo Mission; Brazil São Paulo East Mission; Brazil São Paulo West Mission; Brazil São Paulo Interlagos Mission; Brazil São Paulo North Mission; Brazil São Paulo South Mission; Brazil Sorocaba Mission; Brazil Teresina Mission; Brazil Vitória Mission |

List of Tables
| List | Description |
|---|---|
| By country/territory | List of missions in each country/territory |
| By continent | List missions by continent. |
| By date of formation | List missions by date of formation with other information listed |
| By Area (LDS Church) | Missions listed for each LDS Church Area |

== By date of formation ==
The following is a list of missions in order of creation date. Previous names of the mission, dates of creation and discontinuing of the mission, as well as other information are also provided. Discontinued missions are typically the result of missions being consolidated with missionary efforts still continuing. A few missions were discontinued with the formation of two or more missions in its place. Occasionally missions will be discontinued as a result of government restrictions, military conflict and/or other issues affecting the safety of missionaries serving in the area.

All missions include the word "Mission" as part of their name. For conciseness in creating the table, the names of some missions were abbreviated and the word "Mission" was removed. Due to its excessive length, table best viewed using "Make headers of tables display as long as the table is in view" setting.

| Mission | organized | Other names | Discontinued | notes |
|---|---|---|---|---|
| British | 20 July 1837 | England East 1970; England London 1974 | extant | |
| Eastern States | 6 May 1839 | | Apr 1850 | |
| Society Islands | 30 Apr 1844 | | 15 May 1852 | note Addison Pratt was a major figure in this mission) |
| Welsh | 15 Dec 1845 | | 26 Mar 1854 | |
| California | 31 July 1846 | | 1858 | note Headquarters was in San Francisco until the 1906 earthquake when it was relocated to Los Angeles |
| Scandinavian | 11 May 1850 | Danish 1920; Denmark 1970; Denmark Copenhagen 1974 | extant | note Split 1 Apr 1920 into the Danish and Norwegian Missions |
| French | 18 June 1850 | | 1864 | note Also included the Channel Islands |
| Italian | 1 Nov 1850 | | 1 Jan 1854 | note 1850-1853, mostly focused on the Waldensians in Northern Italy |
| Swiss | 24 Nov 1850 | Swiss and Italian 1954; Swiss, Italian and German 1861; Swiss and German 1868; Swiss 1898; Swiss-German 1904; Swiss Austrian 1938; Swiss 1938; Swiss Austrian 1946; Swiss 1960; Switzerland 1970; Switzerland Zurich 1974 | 1 July 2010 | |
| Sandwich Islands | 12 Dec 1850 | | 1 May 1858 | |
| Australian | 30 Oct 1851 | Australasian 1854; Australian 1898; Australia East 1970; Australia Sydney 1974; Australia Sydney South 1993; Australia Sydney 2010 | extant | note Also covered New Zealand when it was Australasian mission |
| East Indian | 1 Jan 1851 | | 2 May 1856 | note Snow never made it to India. Richard Ballantyne functioned more as head of mission on the ground. This mission focused primarily on British and half-British populations. Its failure was largely due to lacking the working class population that in Britain had been the main source of converts to the LDS Church. |
| Malta | 26 Feb 1852 | | 1856 | note This mission also oversaw Church members deployed with British forces in the Crimean War. |
| German | 3 Apr 1852 | | 1 Jan 1861 | note 1 Jan 1861, Merged into the Swiss, Italian, and German Mission. |
| Gibraltar | 7 Mar 1853 | | 5 Jul 1854 | |
| South African | 19 Apr 1853 | | 12 Apr 1865 | |
| Eastern States | 1854 | | 1858 | |
| Siam | 6 Apr 1854 | | 12 Aug 1854 | |
| European (Admin.) | 28 Jun 1854 | | 14 Feb 1950 | note Up until 1930 the president of this mission was normally also president of the British Mission. Most of the mission presidents were members of the quorum of the 12 apostles. |
| Indian Territory | 26 Jun 1855 | | 23 May 1860 | |
| Sandwich Islands | 27 Mar 1864 | Hawaiian 1900; Hawaii 1950; Hawaii Honolulu 1974 | Extant | note The mission probably would have failed if it had not been for George Q. Cannon's successful teaching of Native Hawaiians, Clark had mainly only focused on European and Euro-American sailors and settlers. Among Cannon's converts was Jonathan Napela who was key to translating the Book of Mormon into the Hawaiian language. Between 1864 and World War II the mission focused primarily on the native Hawaiian population. |
| Netherlands | 1 Nov 1864 | Netherlands-Belgium 1891; Netherlands 1914; Netherlands Amsterdam1974 | 1 July 2002 | |
| Eastern States | 1865 | | 1869 | |
| Southern States | 9 Oct 1876 | Georgia - South Carolina 1971; Georgia Atlanta1974 | extant | note Charles A. Callis was mission President from Aug 1908 to Oct 1933 |
| Indian Territory | Mar 1877 | | 12 Sep 1877 | |
| Northwestern States* | 6 May 1878 | Northern States 1889; Illinois 1973; Illinois Chicago 1974; Illinois Chicago North 1980; Illinois Chicago 1983; Chicago South 2004 | 1 July 2010 | |
| Mexican | 16 Nov 1879 | | Jun 1889 | |
| Indian Territory | 20 Apr 1883 | Southwestern States 1898; Central States 1904; Kansas-Missouri 1970; Missouri Independence 1974 | extant | |
| East Indian | 1 Aug 1884 | | 10 Jun 1885 | |
| Turkish | 30 Dec 1884 | | 1 Oct 1909 | note Most of the converts in this mission were ethnic Armenians (1884-1909). |
| Samoan | 17 June 1888 | Samoa1970; Samoa Apia1974; Samoa Apia West 2026 | extant | |
| Society Islands | 29 Apr 1892 | Tahitian 1907; French-Polynesian 1959; French-Polynesia 1970; Tahiti Papeete 1974 | extant | |
| California | 23 Aug 1892 | California Los Angeles 1974 | extant | note Headquarters was in San Francisco until the 1906 earthquake when it was relocated to Los Angeles |
| Eastern States | Jan 1893^{11} | New York New York 1974; New York New York South 1993 | 1 July 2018 | |
| Montana | 10 Sep 1896 | | 12 Jun 1898 | |
| Colorado | 15 Dec 1896 | Western States1907; Colorado-New Mexico 1970; Colorado 1972; Colorado Denver 1974; Colorado Denver South 1993; Colorado Denver West 2026 | extant | |
| Northwestern States* | 26 July 1897 | Oregon 1970; Oregon Portland 1974 | extant | |
| New Zealand | 1 Jan 1898 | New Zealand North 1970; New Zealand Auckland 1974 | extant | |
| German | 1 Jan 1898 | | 22 May 1904 | |
| Mexican | 8 Jun 1901 | Mexico 1970; Mexico Mexico City 1974; Mexico Mexico City South 1979 | extant | note From 1912 to 1936 the mission was headquartered in El Paso, Texas, and included missionaries serving in Texas, New Mexico, Arizona and California in the Spanish language. |
| Japan | 12 Aug 1901 | | 31 Jul 1924 | note The discontinuance of this mission in 1924 was partly a result of anti-American feeling in Japan due to U.S. policies against Japanese immigration. |
| Middle States | 28 June 1902 | | 7 Aug 1903 | note Consolidated to Southern States Mission |
| South African | 25 Jul 1903 | South African 1970; South Africa Johannesburg 1974 | extant | |
| Swedish | 15 June 1905 | Sweden 1970; Sweden Stockholm 1974 | extant | |
| French | 15 Oct 1912 | | 18 Sep 1914 | |
| Tongan | 8 July 1916 | Tonga 1970; Tonga Nuku'alofa 1974 | extant | |
| Canadian | 1 Jul 1919 | Ontario-Quebec 1970; Ontario 1972; Canada Toronto 1974; Canada Toronto West 1993; Canada Toronto 2011; Canada Toronto West2026 | extant | |
| Norwegian | 1 Apr 1920 | Norway 1970; Norway Oslo 1974 | extant | |
| Turkish | 36 Nov 1921 | Armenian 1924; Palestine-Syrian 1933 | 1939 | |
| French | 20 Aug 1923 | France 1970; France Paris 1974; France Paris West 2026 | extant | |
| North Central States | 12 July 1925 | Manitoba-Minnesota 1970; Minnesota-Wisconsin 1973; Minnesota Minneapolis 1974 | extant | |
| South American | 12 July 1925 | | 25 May 1935 | note Based in Buenos Aires, mainly concentrated on German immigrant population in Brazil and Argentina, in 1935, split into missions in Brazil and Argentina |
| German-Austrian | 23 Aug 1925 | | 1 Jan 1938 | note 1 Jan 1938 split to create West German and East German Missions with a portion going back into the Swiss Austrian Mission. |
| East Central States | 9 Dec 1928 | Kentucky-Tennessee 1970; Kentucky Louisville 1974 | extant | |
| Czechoslovak | 24 Jul 1929 | | 6 Apr 1950 | |
| Texas* | 11 Jan 1931 | Texas-Louisiana 1945; Gulf States 1955; Kentucky-Tennessee 1970; Louisiana Shreveport 1974; Louisiana Baton Rouge 1975 | extant | |
| Brazilian | 25 May 1935 | Brazil Central 1970; Brazil North Central 1972; Brazil São Paulo North 1974 | extant | note Split in 1972 into the Brazil South Central and Brazil North Central missions, all these missions were based in São Paulo. The mission primarily taught in German until 1939 when teaching was entirely shifted to Portuguese. |
| Argentine | 25 May 1935 | Argentina South 1970; Buenos Aires North 1974 | extant | |
| Spanish-American | 28 Jun 1936 | | Dec 1967 | note This mission was organized from the part of the Mexican in the United States, when it was discontinued its operations were merged with the geographical missions in Texas, California and Colorado/New Mexico, making it so the mission now covered all LDS missionary work in a given geographical area |
| Japanese | 24 Feb 1937 | Central Pacific 1944 | 1 Apr 1950 | note This mission was organized to teach Japanese people in Hawaii, when it was merged with the Hawaiian in 1950 there was a decision to aim at teaching all residents of the islands without regard to race or ethnicity, the Hawaiian had till then primarily concentrated on teaching ethnic Hawaiian people. |
| New England | 24 Sep 1937 | Massachusetts Boston 1974 | extant | |
| West German | 1 Jan 1938 | Germany West 1970; Germany Frankfurt 1974 | extant | |
| East German | 1 Jan 1938 | North German 1957; Germany North 1970; Germany Hamburg 1974 | 1 July 2010 | |
| Western Canadian | 15 Sep 1941 | Alberta-Saskatchewan 1970; Canada Calgary 1974 | extant | |
| Northern California | 2 Jan 1942 | California North 1970; California Sacramento1974 | extant | |
| Navajo-Zuni | 7 Mar 1943 | Southwest Indian 1949; New Mexico-Arizona 1972; Arizona Holbrook 1974 | 1 July 1984 | |
| Pacific (Admin.) | 7 Dec 1946 | | 27 Nov 1948 | note This was an administrative mission overseeing missions in Tonga, Hawaii, Samoa, New Zealand and Australia |
| Uruguay | 31 Aug 1947 | Uruguay-Paraguay 1970; Uruguay Montevideo 1974; Uruguay Montevideo East 2026 | extant | |
| Finnish | 1 Sep 1947 | Finland 1970; Finland Helsinki 1974 | extant | |
| Central Atlantic States | 26 Oct 1947 | North Carolina-Virginia 1970; Virginia 1973; Virginia Roanoke 1974; Virginia Richmond 1992 | extant | |
| Palestine-Syrian | 8 Nov 1947 | Near East 1950 | Jan 1951 | note most heavy missionary work was in Lebanon(1947-1951) |
| Japanese | 6 Mar 1948 | | 28 Jul 1955 | note In 1955, split into the Northern Far East and the Southern Far East, the mission by then had operations in Hong Kong, Taiwan and South Korea as well as Japan. |
| Chinese | 10 Jul 1949 | | 9 Feb 1953 | note This mission covered both Hong Kong and Taiwan |
| Great Lakes | 31 Oct 1949 | Indiana-Michigan 1970; Indiana 1973; Indiana Indianapolis 1974 | extant | note it was headquartered in Fort Wayne, Indiana when the Indiana-Michigan |
| West Central States | 11 Nov 1950 | Montana-Wyoming 1970; Montana Billings 1974 | extant | |
| Central American | 16 Nov 1952 | Central America 1970; Costa Rica San Jose 1974; Costa Rica San Jose East 2015 | extant | |
| South Australian | 3 July 1955 | Southern Australian 1958; Australia South 1968; Australia Melbourne 1974; Australia Melbourne East 1998; Australia Melbourne 2010 | extant | |
| Northern Far East | 28 Jul 1955 | | 31 Aug 1968 | note This mission originally covered Japan, South Korea and Okinawa, the South Korea part was soon made a separate mission, it was split in 1968 into the Japan and Okinawa missions |
| Southern Far East | 17 Aug 1955 | Hong Kong Taiwan 1969; Hong Kong 1971; China Hong Kong 1997 | extant | note This mission initially also covered the Philippines, and South Vietnam, in several areas of the mission most members were U.S. servicemen and missionary work was often primarily also among U.S. military personnel |
| Northern Mexican | 10 June 1956 | Mexico North 1970; Mexico Monterrey 1974; Mexico Monterrey West 1992; Mexico Monterrey North 1992; Mexico Monterrey East 2006 | extant | |
| West Spanish-American | 8 Mar 1958 | | 1 July 1970 | note This mission covered teaching in Spanish in California, Nevada and Arizona, in 1970 missions were realigned to cover all teaching within a given geography |
| New Zealand South | 1 Sep 1958 | New Zealand Wellington 1974 | 1 Jul 1981 | |
| Brazilian South | 20 Sep 1959 | Brazil South 1970; Brazil Porto Alegre 1974; Brazil Porto Alegre South 1991 | extant | |
| South German | 4 Oct 1959 | Germany South 1970; Germany Munich 1974; Munich Germany/Austria 2002; Alpine German Speaking 2010 | extant | |
| Andes | 1 Nov 1959 | Peru—Ecuador 1970; Peru1970; Peru Andes1971; Andes Peru1971; Peru Lima 1974; Peru Lima South 1977 | extant | note The mission initially included Argentina and Bolivia as well. It also oversaw the initial beginning of missionary work in Colombia. |
| European (Admin.) | 17 Jan 1960 | | 14 Sep 1965 | note Administrative mission overseeing all the missions in Europe and based in Germany. |
| North British | 27 Mar 1960 | England North 1970; England Leeds 1974 | extant | note this mission also initially included Scotland |
| Austrian | 18 Sep 1960 | Austria 1970; Austria Vienna 1974 | 1 July 2002 | |
| Eastern Atlantic States | 16 Oct 1960 | Delaware-Maryland 1970; Washington D. C. 1974; Washington D. C. South 1986 | extant | note The mission primarily consists of the Northern Virginia suburbs of Washington, D.C., it does not include any of Washington D.C. |
| Florida | 1 Nov 1960 | Florida South 1970; Florida Fort Lauderdale 1974 | 20 June 1983 | note This mission covered all operations of the Church in the Caribbean at least until the early 1980s and still covered parts of the Caribbean when disestablished, among the missions it was split into in 1983 was the new West Indies, also split to the Florida Tampa. |
| West Mexican | 1 Nov 1960 | Mexico West 1970; Mexico Hermosillo 1974 | extant | |
| Rarotonga | 20 Nov 1960 | | 15 Apr 1966 | note Consolidated into the New Zealand, missionary work continues in the Cook Islands, but it is not deemed enough to justify a separate mission, partly because improved communications make it easier to supervise the mission from New Zealand than it was in the early 1960s |
| Alaska-Canadian | 21 Nov 1960 | Alaska-British Columbia 1970; Canada Vancouver 1974 | extant | |
| French East | 19 Jan 1961 | France-Switzerland 1970; Switzerland Geneva 1974 | 1 July 2011 | |
| Texas* | 16 Feb 1961 | Texas North 1970; Texas Dallas 1974; Texas Dallas West 2020 | extant | |
| Scottish-Irish | 28 Feb 1961 | Scottish 1962; Scotland 1970; Scotland Edinburgh 1974; Scotland/Ireland 2010 | extant | |
| Central British | 6 Mar 1961 | England Central 1970; England Birmingham 1974 | extant | |
| Central German | 15 Mar 1961 | Germany Central 1970; Germany Düsseldorf 1974 | 1 April 1982 | |
| West European (Admin.) | 30 Apr 1961 | | 14 Sep 1965 | note This was an administrative mission overseeing multiple other missions. It was based in Germany. |
| Berlin | 14 July 1961 | | 31 May 1966 | |
| South American (Admin.) | 25 Aug 1961 | | 8 Oct 1965 | note This was an administrative mission overseeing other missions |
| Chilean | 8 Oct 1961 | Chile 1970; Chile Santiago 1974; Chile Santiago South 1977; Chile Rancagua 2004 | extant | |
| Southwest British | 1 Feb 1962 | England Southwest 1970; England Bristol 1974 | 1 July 2002 | |
| Bavarian | 14 Mar 1962 | | 10 Jun 1965 | |
| Irish | 8 July 1962 | Ireland 1970; Ireland Belfast 1974; Ireland Dublin 1976 | 1 July 2010 | |
| Korean | 8 July 1962 | Korea 1970; Korea Seoul 1974 | extant | |
| Northeast British | 16 Sep 1962 | | May 1965 | |
| North Argentine | 16 Sep 1962 | Argentina North 1970; Argentina Cordoba 1974 | extant | |
| North Scottish | 24 Nov 1962 | | 31 May 1965 | |
| Southeast Mexican | 27 Mar 1963 | Mexico Southeast 1970; Mexico Veracruz 1974 | extant | |
| Franco-Belgian | 1 Oct 1963 | France-Belgium 1970; Belgium Brussels 1974; Brussels/Netherlands 2002; Belgium/Netherlands 2010 | extant | |
| Cumorah | 26 Jan 1964 | New York Rochester 1974; New York Syracuse 2019 | extant | |
| Northern Indian | 8 Apr 1964 | Dakota-Manitoba 1973; South Dakota Rapid City 1974; North Dakota Bismarck 2014 | extant | note The mission initially only supervised missionaries working specifically with Native Americans, it was later realigned to cover all missionary work within a geographical area |
| British South | 27 Dec 1964 | England South 1970; England London South 1974 | 1 July 2018 | |
| Guatemala-El Salvador | 1 Aug 1965 | Guatemala Guatemala City 1974; Guatemala City South 1988; 2014Guatemala City 2020 | extant | |
| Andes South | 7 Jul 1966 | Bolivia 1969; Bolivia La Paz 1974 | extant | |
| California South | 10 Jul 1966 | California Anaheim 1974 | extant | |
| Italian | 2 Aug 1966 | Italy 1970; Italy South 1971; Italy Rome 1974 | extant | |
| Philippine | 28 June 1967 | Philippines 1970; Philippines Manila 1974 | extant | |
| Ohio | 29 Jun 1967 | Ohio-West Virginia 1972; Ohio Columbus 1974 | extant | |
| Texas South | 10 Dec 1967 | Texas San Antonio 1974; Texas San Antonio North 2026 | extant | |
| Pacific Northwest | 1 Jan 1968 | Washington 1970; Washington Seattle 1974 | extant | |
| Colombia-Venezuela | 1 Jul 1968 | Colombia 1970; Colombia Bogota 1974; Colombia Bogota North 1992 | extant | |
| Brazilian North | 7 July 1968 | Brazil North 1970; Brazil Rio de Janeiro 1974; Brazil Rio de Janeiro North 2018 | extant | |
| Australian West | 1 Aug 1968 | Australia West 1970; Australia Adelaide 1974 | extant | |
| Mexico North Central | 5 Aug 1968 | Mexico Torreon 1974 | extant | |
| Japan | 1 Sep 1968 | Japan Tokyo 1974; Japan Tokyo North 1978; Japan Tokyo 2007; Japan Tokyo North 2013 | extant | |
| Japan-Okinawa | 1 Sep 1968 | Japan Central 1970; Japan Kobe 1974 | extant | |
| Germany Dresden | 14 June 1969 | | Dec 1978 | note This mission did not have full-time missionaries, it existed to oversee operations of the Church in East Germany (during cold war era). |
| California Central | 1 July 1969 | California Oakland 1974; Oakland/San Francisco 2009 | extant | |
| California East | 1 July 1969 | California Arcadia 1974 | extant | |
| Arizona | 1 July 1969 | Arizona Tempe 1974 | extant | |
| South Central States | 4 Aug 1969 | Oklahoma 1970; Oklahoma Tulsa 1974; Arkansas Bentonville 2015 | extant | note Mission headquarters moved from Tulsa to Bentonville and from the North America Southwest Area to the North America Southeast Area in 2015. |
| Southeast Asia | 1 Nov 1969 | Singapore 1974 | extant | note At the time or creation, the mission covered Church operations in South Vietnam and Thailand as well as Singapore. |
| Japan East | 16 Mar 1970 | Japan Sapporo 1974 | extant | |
| Japan West | 18 March 1970 | Japan Fukuoka 1974 | extant | |
| Pennsylvania | 1 July 1970 | Pennsylvania Harrisburg 1974 | 1 July 2009 | |
| Spain | 11 July 1970 | Spain Madrid 1974; Spain Madrid South 2022 | extant | |
| Ecuador | 1 Aug 1970 | Ecuador Quito 1974; Ecuador Quito South 2024 | extant | |
| Taiwan | 11 Dec 1970 | Taiwan Taipei 1974 | extant | |
| Alabama-Florida | 1 Jun 1971 | Florida Tallahassee 1974 | 1 July 2019 | |
| Venezuela | 1 July 1971 | Venezuela Caracas 1974; Venezuela Caracas East 1991; Venezuela Caracas 1994 | extant | |
| Nauvoo | 1 July 1971 | Illinois Nauvoo 1974 | 1 July 1974 | |
| Italy North | 1 July 1971 | Italy Milan 1974 | extant | |
| Fiji | 23 July 1971 | Fiji Suva 1974 | extant | |
| Quebec | 1 July 1972 | Canada Montreal 1974 | extant | |
| Argentina East | 1 July 1972 | Argentina Rosario 1974 | extant | |
| Brazil South Central | 17 Oct 1972 | Brazil São Paulo South 1974 | extant | |
| International | 9 Nov 1972 | | 15 Aug 1987 | note Included all areas of the world not included in other organized missions |
| Michigan | 1 July 1973 | Michigan Lansing 1974 | extant | |
| North Carolina | 15 July 1973 | North Carolina Greensboro 1974; North Carolina Charlotte 1980 | extant | |
| Canada-Maritimes | 1 July 1973 | Canada Halifax 1974 | 1 July 2019 | |
| Australia Northeast | 25 July 1973 | Australia Brisbane 1974; Australia Brisbane North 2026 | extant | |
| Japan-Nagoya | 1 Aug 1973 | Japan Nagoya 1974 | extant | |
| Thailand | 6 Aug 1973 | Thailand Bangkok 1974; Thailand Bangkok West 2024 | extant | |
| Japan Sendai | 1 July 1974 | | 1 July 2019 | |
| Philippines Cebu City | 1 July 1974 | Philippines Cebu 1984; Philippines Bacolod 1988 | extant | |
| Idaho Pocatello* | 1 July 1974 | Idaho Boise 1979 | extant | |
| Buenos Aires South | 1 July 1974 | | extant | |
| California San Diego | 1 Jul 1974 | | extant | |
| Alaska Anchorage | 15 Oct 1974 | | extant | |
| Portugal Lisbon | 19 Nov 1974 | Portugal Lisbon South 1990; Portugal Lisbon 2002 | extant | |
| Arkansas Little Rock | 1 July 1975 | | extant | |
| Australia Perth | 1 July 1975 | | extant | |
| California Fresno | 1 July 1975 | | extant | |
| Chile Concepcion | 1 July 1975 | | extant | |
| Colombia Cali | 1 July 1975 | | extant | |
| France Toulouse | 1 July 1975 | | 1 July 1982 | |
| Indonesia Jakarta | 1 July 1975 | | 1 Jan 1981 | |
| Italy Padova | 1 July 1975 | | 1 July 1982 | |
| Korea Busan | 1 July 1975 | | extant | |
| Mexico Guadalajara | 1 July 1975 | | extant | |
| Mexico Villahermosa* | 1 July 1975 | México Mérida 1978 | extant | |
| Nevada Las Vegas | 1 July 1975 | Nevada Las Vegas East 2024 | extant | |
| New Mexico Albuquerque | 1 July 1975 | | extant | |
| Pennsylvania Pittsburgh | 1 July 1975 | | extant | |
| South Carolina Columbia | 1 July 1975 | | extant | |
| Tennessee Nashville | 1 July 1975 | | extant | |
| Utah Salt Lake City* | 1 July 1975 | Utah Salt Lake City North 1980; Utah Ogden 1989 | extant | |
| Yugoslavia Zagreb | 1 July 1975 | | 1 July 1976 | |
| Belgium Antwerp | 1 July 1975 | | 1982 | |
| Iran Tehran | 4 July 1975 | | 1 Jan 1979 | |
| Canada Winnipeg | 15 Feb 1976 | | extant | |
| Spain Barcelona | 8 May 1976 | | extant | |
| El Salvador San Salvador | 1 July 1976 | | 1 Apr 1981 | |
| England Manchester | 1 July 1976 | | extant | |
| Florida Tampa | 1 July 1976 | | extant | |
| Iowa Des Moines | 1 July 1976 | Iowa Iowa City 2022 | extant | |
| Spain Seville | 1 July 1976 | Spain Malaga 1993 | 1 July 2018 | |
| Texas Houston | 1 July 1976 | Texas Houston West 2026 | extant | |
| New Zealand Christchurch | 1 July 1976 | New Zealand Wellington 1991 | extant | |
| Japan Okayama | 1 July 1976 | Japan Hiroshima 1998 | 1 July 2010 | |
| Sweden Göteborg | 1 July 1976 | | 1 July 1982 | |
| Taiwan Kaohsiung | 3 Aug 1976 | Taiwan Taichung 1983; Taiwan Kaohsiung 2025 | extant | 1 Jul 1982 |
| Scotland Glasgow | 11 Sep 1976 | | 1 July 1982 | |
| Chile Santiago North | 1 Jan 1977 | | extant | |
| Peru Lima North | 1 Jan 1977 | | extant | |
| Bolivia Santa Cruz* | 1 July 1977 | Bolivia Cochabamba 1982; Bolivia Cochabamba North 2024 | extant | |
| Chile Osorno | 1 July 1977 | Chile Puerto Montt 2022 | extant | |
| Guatemala Quetzaltenango | 1 July 1977 | | extant | |
| Missouri St. Louis | 1 July 1977 | | extant | |
| Ohio Cleveland | 1 July 1977 | | 1 July 2018 | |
| Paraguay Asuncion | 1 July 1977 | Paraguay Asuncion East 2026 | extant | |
| Pennsylvania Philadelphia | 1 July 1977 | | extant | |
| Philippines Davao | 1 July 1977 | | extant | |
| Italy Catania | 10 July 1977 | | 1 July 2010 | |
| California San Jose | 1 July 1978 | | extant | |
| California Ventura | 1 July 1978 | | extant | |
| Ecuador Guayaquil | 1 July 1978 | Ecuador Guayaquil 1995; Ecuador Guayaquil 1995; Ecuador Guayaquil South 1982 | extant | |
| England London East | 1 July 1978 | | 1 July 1983 | |
| Japan Tokyo South | 1 July 1978 | | Mar 2007 | |
| Mexico City North | 1 July 1978 | | extant | |
| Michigan Dearborn | 1 July 1978 | Michigan Detroit 1989 | extant | |
| Peru Arequipa | 1 July 1978 | | extant | |
| Washington Spokane | 1 July 1978 | | extant | |
| Wisconsin Milwaukee | 1 July 1978 | | extant | |
| Alabama Birmingham | 1 Jan 1979 | | extant | |
| Brazil Recife | 1 July 1979 | Brazil Recife North 2020 | extant | |
| Chile Vina Del Mar | 1 July 1979 | | extant | |
| Connecticut Hartford | 1 July 1979 | | 1 July 2011 | |
| Korea Seoul West | 1 July 1979 | | 1 July 2010 | |
| Mississippi Jackson | 1 July 1979 | | 1 July 2018 | |
| Philippines Quezon City* | 1 July 1979 | Philippines Baguio 1981; Philippines La Union 1991; Philippines Baguio 1991 | extant | |
| Taiwan Taichung | 1 July 1979 | | 1 July 1982 | |
| Venezuela Maracaibo | 1 July 1979 | | extant | |
| Puerto Rico San Juan | 1 July 1979 | PR San Juan West 2007; Puerto Rico San Juan 2010 | extant | |
| Honduras Tegucigalpa | 1 Feb 1980 | | extant | |
| Micronesia Guam | 1 July 1980 | | extant | |
| Africa West | 1 July 1980 | Nigeria Lagos 1985 | extant | |
| Argentina Bahia Blanca | 1 July 1980 | | extant | |
| Brazil Curitiba | 1 July 1980 | | extant | |
| California San Bernardino | 1 July 1980 | California Redlands 2013; California San Bernardino 2019 | extant | |
| England Coventry | 1 July 1980 | | 1993 | |
| Illinois Chicago South | 1 July 1980 | | 1 July 1983 | |
| Japan Osaka | 1 July 1980 | | 1 July 1995 | |
| North Carolina Raleigh | 1 July 1980 | | extant | |
| Utah Salt Lake City South* | 1 July 1980 | Utah Provo 1989 | extant | |
| West Virginia Charleston | 1 July 1980 | | extant | |
| DR Santo Domingo | 1 Jan 1981 | Santo Domingo West 1991 | extant | |
| West Indies | 20 June 1983 | Barbados Bridgetown 2015 | extant | |
| Illinois Peoria | 1 July 1983 | | 1 July 2010 | |
| GDR Dresden | 12 Mar 1984 | | 3 June 1984 | note This mission did not have full-time missionaries, it existed to oversee operations of the Church in East Germany (during cold war era). |
| South Africa Cape Town | 1 July 1984 | | extant | |
| Florida Fort Lauderdale | 1 July 1984 | | extant | |
| Ohio Akron | 1 July 1984 | | 1 July 1989 | |
| Arizona Phoenix | 1 July 1984 | Arizona Phoenix West 2026 | extant | |
| Haiti Port-au-Prince | 1 Aug 1984 | | extant | |
| El Salvador San Salvador | 1 Oct 1984 | San Salvador West 1990; Santa Ana/Belize 2011; El Salvador Santa Ana 2014 | extant | note Belize went to the El Salvador San Salvador West Mission later in the 2010s. |
| Ghana Accra | 1 July 1985 | Ghana Accra East2024 | extant | |
| Indonesia Jakarta | 1 July 1985 | | 1 July 1989 | |
| Peru Trujillo | 1 July 1985 | Peru Trujillo North 2015 | extant | |
| Brazil Brasilia | 1 July 1985 | | extant | |
| Jamaica Kingston | 1 July 1985 | | extant | |
| California Santa Rosa | 1 July 1985 | | extant | |
| Washington D.C. North | 1 July 1986 | | extant | |
| Texas Lubbock* | 1 July 1986 | Texas Fort Worth 1988 | extant | |
| Brazil Campinas | 1 July 1986 | | extant | |
| Korea Daejeon | 1 July 1986 | | 1 July 2019 | |
| Philippines Quezon City* | 1 July 1986 | | extant | |
| Mexico Mexico City East | 1 July 1987 | | extant | |
| Philippines Cebu East* | 1 July 1987 | Philippines Cebu 1988 | extant | |
| New Hampshire Manchester | 1 July 1987 | | extant | |
| DR Santiago | 1 July 1987 | | extant | |
| Florida Jacksonville | 1 July 1987 | | extant | |
| Zaire Kinshasa | 1 July 1987 | DRC Kinshasa 1997; DRC Kinshasa West 2019 | extant | |
| Spain Bilbao | 1 July 1987 | | 1 July 2010 | |
| Brazil Fortaleza | 1 July 1987 | | extant | |
| Mexico Mazatlan | 1 July 1987 | Mexico Culiacan 1995 | extant | |
| New Jersey Morristown | 1 July 1987 | | extant | |
| Portugal Porto | 1 July 1987 | | 1 July 2011 | |
| Zimbabwe Harare | 1 July 1987 | Zimbabwe Harare East 2026 | extant | |
| Austria Vienna East | 1 July 1987 | Ukraine Kyiv 1992 | extant | |
| Guatemala City North | 1 Jan 1988 | Guatemala City East | extant | |
| Argentina Salta | 8 Jan 1988 | | extant | |
| Mexico Chihuahua | 8 Jan 1988 | | extant | |
| Mexico Tuxtla Gutierrez | 8 Jan 1988 | | extant | |
| Peru Lima East | 8 Jan 1988 | | extant | |
| PH Cagayan de Oro | 8 Jan 1988 | | extant | |
| Liberia Monrovia | 1 Mar 1988 | Liberia Monrovia East 2026 | 12 Feb 1991 | |
| Brazil Belo Horizonte | 1 July 1988 | | extant | |
| Chile Antofagasta | 1 July 1988 | | extant | |
| Colombia Barranquilla | 1 July 1988 | | extant | |
| Mascarene Islands | 1 July 1988 | South Africa Durban 1991 | extant | |
| Mexico Puebla | 1 July 1988 | Mexico Puebla South 2012 | extant | note Mission split 1 July 2012 creating Mexico Puebla North/South missions |
| Mexico Tampico | 1 Jul 1988 | Mexico Monterrey East 1992; Mexico Tampico 1992 | extant | |
| PH Quezon City West | 1 July 1988 | Philippines San Fernando 1991; Philippines Olongapo 1994 | extant | |
| Spain Las Palmas | 1 July 1988 | | 1 July 2006 | |
| Nigeria Aba* | 1 July 1988 | Nigeria Port Harcourt 1995; Nigeria Port Harcourt South 2025 | extant | |
| France Bordeaux | 1 July 1989 | | 1 July 2001 | note see also France Toulouse |
| GDR Dresden | 1 July 1989 | Germany Dresden 1990; Germany Leipzig 1994 | 1 July 2003 | |
| Utah Salt Lake City* | 1 Jan 1989 | Utah Layton 2018 | extant | |
| Mexico Querétaro* | 1 July 1989 | Mexico Leon 1992; México Aguascalientes 2013 | extant | |
| Philippines Naga | 1 July 1989 | | extant | |
| Texas Corpus Christi | 1 July 1989 | Texas McAllen 1994 | extant | |
| Panama Panama City | 1 July 1989 | | extant | |
| Nicaragua Managua | 15 Oct 1989 | Nicaragua Managua South 2010 | extant | |
| Argentina Mendoza | 1 July 1990 | | extant | |
| Argentina Resistencia | 1 July 1990 | | extant | |
| Argentina Trelew | 1 July 1990 | Argentina Neuquén 1993 | extant | |
| Arizona Tucson | 1 July 1990 | | extant | |
| Belgium Antwerp | 1 July 1990 | | 1 July 1995 | |
| Brazil Manaus | 1 July 1990 | Brazil Manaus North 2024 | extant | |
| Brazil Salvador | 1 July 1990 | Brazil Feira de Santana 2023 | extant | |
| California Riverside | 1 July 1990 | | extant | |
| Czechoslovakia Prague | 1 July 1990 | Czech Republic Prague 1993; Czech Prague 1995; Czech/Slovak 2013 | extant | |
| ES San Salvador East | 1 July 1990 | El Salvador San Salvador 2011; San Salvador West/Belize 2013; San Salvador West 2025 | extant | note Belize became part of the mission in a boundary realignment later in 2013. By 2025, Belize was reassigned to a mission in Guatemala |
| Finland Helsinki East | 1 July 1990 | Russia Moscow 1992 | extant | |
| Georgia Macon | 1 July 1990 | | 1 July 2011 | |
| Germany Düsseldorf | 1 July 1990 | | 1 July 2001 | |
| Greece Athens | 1 July 1990 | | 1 July 2018 | |
| Honduras San Pedro Sula | 1 July 1990 | San Pedro Sula East 2013 | extant | |
| Hungary Budapest | 1 July 1990 | Hungary/Romania 2018; Hungary Budapest 2023 | extant | |
| Italy Padova | 1 July 1990 | | 1 July 2002 | |
| Japan Okinawa | 1 July 1990 | | 1 July 1996 | |
| Mexico Oaxaca | 1 July 1990 | | extant | |
| Mexico Tijuana | 1 July 1990 | | extant | |
| Oklahoma Oklahoma City | 1 July 1990 | | extant | |
| Oregon Eugene | 1 July 1990 | | extant | |
| Philippines San Pablo | 26 June 1990 | | extant | |
| Philippines Tacloban | 1 July 1990 | | extant | |
| Poland Warsaw | 1 July 1990 | | extant | |
| Portugal Lisbon North | 1 July 1990 | | 1 July 2002 | |
| Texas Houston East | 1 July 1990 | | extant | |
| Washington Tacoma | 1 July 1990 | | extant | |
| Philippines Ilagan | 1 Sep 1990 | Philippines Cauayan 2007 | extant | |
| Brazil Porto Alegre North | 1 July 1991 | | extant | |
| Brazil Sao Paulo East | 1 July 1991 | | extant | |
| Sao Paulo Interlagos | 1 July 1991 | | extant | |
| Bulgaria Sofia | 1 July 1991 | Bulgarian Central Eurasian 2018; Bulgaria/Greece 2023; Bulgaria Sofia2026 | 1 July 2018 | |
| DR Santo Domingo East | 1 July 1991 | | extant | |
| Ecuador Guayaquil North | 1 July 1991 | | 16 June 1995 | |
| France Marseille | 1 July 1991 | France Toulouse 2002; France Lyon 2011 | extant | |
| Germany Berlin | 1 July 1991 | | extant | |
| Idaho Pocatello* | 1 July 1991 | | extant | |
| Kenya Nairobi | 1 July 1991 | Kenya Nairobi West 2024 | extant | |
| Trinidad Tobago | 1 July 1991 | | 1 July 1994 | |
| Venezuela Caracas West | 1 July 1991 | Venezuela Valencia 1994 | extant | |
| Buenos Aires West | 20 Jan 1992 | | extant | |
| Colombia Bogota South | 27 Jan 1992 | | extant | |
| Russia St. Petersburg | 3 Feb 1992 | | 2022 | |
| PNG Port Moresby | 7 Feb 1992 | | extant | |
| Philippines Cabanatuan* | 12 Feb 1992 | Philippines Angeles 1999 | extant | |
| Cameroon Yaoundé* | 1 July 1992 | Ivory Coast Abidjan 1993; Cote d'Ivoire Abidjan East 2014 | extant | |
| Nigeria Ilorin | 1 July 1992 | Nigeria Ibadan 1993 | 1 July 1995 | note Combined with neighboring missions in 1995 and recreated in 2002. |
| Nigeria Jos | 1 July 1992 | Nigeria Enugu 1993 | extant | |
| Mexico Monterrey South | 30 Sep 1992 | México Monterrey West 2006 | extant | |
| Australia Sydney North | 1 Jan 1993 | | 1 July 2010 | |
| India Bangalore | 1 Jan 1993 | India Bengaluru 2006 | extant | |
| Brazil Ribeirao Preto | 1 Feb 1993 | | extant | |
| Rio de Janeiro North | 1 July 1993 | Brazil Vitoria 2009 | extant | |
| Brazil Florianopolis | 1 July 1993 | | extant | |
| Brazil Recife South* | 1 July 1993 | Brazil Maceio 1998 | extant | |
| California Carlsbad | 1 July 1993 | | 1 July 2019 | |
| California Roseville | 1 July 1993 | | extant | |
| Canada Toronto East | 1 July 1993 | | 1 July 2011 | |
| Colorado Denver North | 1 July 1993 | Colorado Denver East 2026 | extant | |
| Guatemala City Central | 1 July 1993 | | extant | |
| Latvia Riga | 1 July 1993 | Lithuania Vilnius 1996; Baltic 2002 | extant | |
| Nebraska Omaha | 1 July 1993 | | extant | |
| New York New York North | 1 July 1993 | | extant | |
| Peru Chiclayo* | 1 July 1993 | Peru Piura 2003 | extant | |
| Romania Bucharest | 1 July 1993 | | 1 July 2018 | note Combined in 2018 to form Hungary/Romania Mission. Reinstated July 2023 |
| Russia Samara | 1 July 1993 | | 1 July 2018 | |
| Tennessee Knoxville | 1 July 1993 | | extant | |
| Ukraine Donetsk | 1 July 1993 | | 9 May 2014 | note Discontinued 9 May 2014 with all missionaries reassigned due to ongoing conflict in the region. |
| Brazil Belem | 1 July 1994 | | extant | |
| Belo Horizonte South | 1 July 1994 | Brazil Belo Horizonte East 1994 | 1 July 2009 | |
| Brazil Salvador South | 1 July 1994 | Brazil Salvador 2023 | extant | |
| California San Fernando | 1 July 1994 | | 1 July 2018 | |
| Maryland Baltimore | 1 July 1994 | | extant | |
| New York Utica | 1 July 1994 | | 1 July 2019 | |
| Peru Lima Central | 1 July 1994 | | extant | |
| Russia Novosibirsk | 1 July 1994 | | extant | |
| Russia Rostov-na-Donu | 1 July 1994 | Russia Rostov 1995; Rostov-na-Donu 2006 | 2022 | |
| Venezuela Barcelona | 1 July 1994 | | extant | |
| Temple Square | 1 July 1995 | | 1 July 2026 | |
| Brazil Marilia | 1 July 1995 | Brazil Londrina 1999 | extant | |
| Chile Santiago West | 1 July 1995 | | extant | |
| Indonesia Jakarta | 1 July 1995 | | extant | |
| New Jersey Cherry Hill | 1 July 1995 | | 1 July 2019 | |
| Russia Yekaterinburg | 1 July 1995 | | 2022 | |
| Mongolia Ulaanbaatar | 1 July 1995 | Mongolia Ulaanbaatar East 2026 | extant | |
| Austria Vienna South | 1 July 1996 | Slovenia Ljubljana 1999; Croatia Zagreb 2003; Adriatic North 2014 | extant | note Previously existed as Yugoslavia Zagreb |
| Albania Tirana | 1 July 1996 | Adriatic South 2014; Albania Tirana 2023 | extant | |
| Ecuador Guayaquil North | 1 July 1996 | | extant | |
| California San Francisco | 1 July 1997 | | 1 July 2009 | |
| Chile Santiago East | 1 July 1997 | | extant | |
| Honduras Comayaguela | 1 July 1997 | | extant | |
| Illinois Chicago North | 1 July 1997 | Illinois Chicago 2010 | extant | |
| Nevada Las Vegas West | 1 July 1997 | | extant | |
| Russia Moscow South | 1 July 1997 | Russia Moscow West 2009 | 1 July 2012 | |
| Texas Houston South | 1 July 1997 | | extant | |
| Uruguay Montevideo West | 1 July 1997 | | extant | |
| Cambodia Phnom Penh | 1 July 1997 | Cambodia Phnom Penh West 2024 | extant | |
| Australia Melbourne West | 1 July 1998 | | 1 July 2010 | |
| Bolivia Santa Cruz* | 1 July 1998 | | extant | |
| Brazil Goiania | 1 July 1998 | | extant | |
| Brazil Joao Pessoa | 1 July 1998 | | extant | |
| Brazil Santa Maria | 1 July 1998 | | extant | |
| California Long Beach | 1 July 1998 | | 1 July 2019 | |
| Canada Edmonton | 1 July 1998 | | extant | |
| Florida Orlando | 1 July 1998 | | extant | |
| Madagascar Antananarivo | 1 July 1998 | | extant | |
| Ohio Cincinnati | 1 July 1998 | | 1 July 2010 | |
| Paraguay Asuncion North | 1 July 1998 | | extant | |
| Taiwan Kaohsiung | 1 July 1998 | | 1 Jul 2009 | |
| Utah Salt lake City South* | 1 July 1998 | | extant | |
| Armenia Yerevan | 16 Mar 1999 | Armenia/Georgia 2019 | extant | |
| Russia Vladivostok | 16 Mar 1999 | | 1 July 2017 | |
| Illinois Nauvoo | 1 Nov 2000 | | extant | note see also Nauvoo Mission (1971) |
| Mexico Mexico City West | 1 July 2001 | | extant | |
| Washington Everett | 1 July 2001 | | extant | |
| Arizona Mesa | 1 July 2002 | | extant | |
| Cape Verde Praia | 1 July 2002 | | extant | |
| Colorado Colorado Springs | 1 July 2002 | | extant | |
| Nigeria Ibadan | 1 July 2002 | | 1 July 2012 | |
| Nigeria Uyo | 1 July 2002 | Nigeria Calabar 2010; Nigeria Uyo 2019 | extant | |
| Texas Lubbock* | 1 July 2002 | | extant | |
| Washington Kennewick | 1 July 2002 | | extant | |
| Georgia Atlanta North | 1 July 2003 | | extant | |
| Mexico Guadalajara South | 1 July 2003 | Mexico Guadalajara East 2012 | extant | |
| Chile Concepcion South | 1 July 2003 | | extant | |
| Philippines Laoag | 1 Nov 2004 | | extant | |
| Mozambique Maputo | 20 Dec 2004 | | extant | |
| Ghana Cape Coast | 1 July 2005 | | extant | |
| Uganda Kampala | 1 July 2005 | Uganda Kampala West 2026 | extant | |
| Brazil Cuiaba | 1 July 2006 | | extant | |
| Mexico Cuernavaca | 1 July 2006 | | extant | |
| Philippines Butuan | 1 July 2006 | | extant | |
| Marshall Islands Majuro | 1 July 2006 | Marshall Islands/Kiribati 2019 | extant | |
| Ukraine Dnipropetrovsk | 22 Feb 2007 | Ukraine Dnipro 2016 | extant | note Renamed Ukraine Dnipro Mission in May 2016 when the city officially changed its name; Missionaries were removed in early 2022 prior to the Russian invasion |
| Puerto Rico San Juan East | 29 June 2007 | | 1 July 2010 | |
| Sierra Leone Freetown | 1 July 2007 | | extant | |
| India New Delhi | 1 Nov 2007 | | extant | |
| Brazil Teresina | 1 July 2009 | | extant | |
| DRC Lubumbashi | 30 June 2010 | | extant | |
| Guatemala Retalhuleu | 30 June 2010 | | extant | |
| Mexico City Northwest | 30 June 2010 | | extant | |
| Mexico Villahermosa* | 30 June 2010 | | extant | |
| New Mexico Farmington | 30 June 2010 | | extant | |
| Nicaragua Managua North | 30 June 2010 | | extant | |
| Peru Cusco | 30 June 2010 | | extant | |
| Peru Lima West | 30 June 2010 | | extant | |
| Philippines Iloilo | 30 June 2010 | | extant | |
| Utah St. George | 30 June 2010 | | extant | |
| Benin Cotonou | 30 June 2011 | | extant | |
| Mexico City Southeast | 30 June 2011 | | extant | |
| Peru Chiclayo* | 30 June 2011 | | extant | |
| PH Quezon City North | 30 June 2011 | | extant | |
| Zambia Lusaka | 30 June 2011 | | extant | |
| Colombia Medellin | 30 June 2012 | | extant | |
| Ghana Kumasi | 30 June 2012 | | extant | |
| Mexico Puebla North | 30 June 2012 | | extant | |
| Mexico Xalapa | 30 June 2012 | | extant | |
| Nevada Reno | 30 June 2012 | | extant | |
| Utah Salt Lake City Central | 30 June 2012 | | 1 July 2016 | |
| Utah Salt Lake City West | 30 June 2012 | | extant | |
| Vanuatu Port Vila | 1 July 2012 | | extant | |
| Angola Luanda | 1 July 2013 | | extant | |
| Comodoro Rivadavia | 1 July 2013 | | extant | |
| Argentina Posadas | 1 July 2013 | | 1 July 2019 | |
| Arizona Gilbert | 1 July 2013 | | extant | |
| Arizona Scottsdale | 1 July 2013 | Arizona Flagstaff 2023 | extant | |
| Australia Sydney North | 1 July 2013 | | 1 July 2018 | |
| Bolivia Santa Cruz North | 1 July 2013 | | extant | |
| Botswana Gaborone | 1 July 2013 | Botswana/Namibia 2016 | extant | |
| Brazil Curitiba South | 1 July 2013 | | extant | |
| Brazil Fortaleza East | 1 July 2013 | | extant | |
| Brazil Juiz de Fora | 1 July 2013 | | extant | |
| Brazil Natal | 1 July 2013 | | extant | |
| Brazil Piracicaba | 1 July 2013 | | extant | |
| Brazil Santos | 1 July 2013 | | extant | |
| Brazil Sao Paulo West | 1 July 2013 | | extant | |
| California Bakersfield | 1 July 2013 | | extant | |
| California Irvine | 1 July 2013 | California Newport Beach 2019 | extant | |
| CA Rancho Cucamonga | 1 July 2013 | | 1 July 2019 | |
| Chile Santiago South | 1 July 2013 | | extant | |
| Colorado Fort Collins | 1 July 2013 | | extant | |
| Ecuador Guayaquil West | 1 July 2013 | | extant | |
| Ecuador Quito North | 1 July 2013 | | extant | |
| San Salvador East | 1 July 2013 | | extant | |
| Georgia Macon | 1 July 2013 | | 1 July 2019 | |
| Ghana Accra West | 1 July 2013 | | extant | |
| Guatemala Coban | 1 July 2013 | Guatemala Cobán/Belize 2025 | extant | |
| San Pedro Sula West | 1 July 2013 | | extant | |
| Idaho Nampa | 1 July 2013 | | 1 July 2019 | |
| Idaho Twin Falls | 1 July 2013 | Idaho Idaho Falls 2016 | extant | |
| Illinois Chicago West | 1 July 2013 | | 1 July 2018 | |
| Japan Tokyo South | 1 July 2013 | | extant | |
| Kansas Wichita | 1 July 2013 | | extant | |
| Korea Seoul South | 1 July 2013 | | extant | |
| Liberia Monrovia | 1 July 2013 | | extant | |
| Mexico Cancun | 1 July 2013 | | extant | |
| Mexico Ciudad Juarez | 1 July 2013 | | extant | |
| Mexico Ciudad Obregon | 1 July 2013 | | 1 July 2018 | |
| Mexico City Chalco | 1 July 2013 | Mexico Cuautla 1 July 2026 | extant | |
| Mexico Pachuca | 1 July 2013 | | extant | |
| Mexico Queretaro* | 1 July 2013 | | extant | |
| Mexico Reynosa | 1 July 2013 | | 1 July 2018 | |
| Mexico Saltillo | 1 July 2013 | | extant | |
| New Zealand Hamilton | 1 July 2013 | | extant | |
| Nigeria Benin City | 1 July 2013 | | extant | |
| Ohio Cincinnati | 1 July 2013 | | extant | |
| Oregon Salem | 1 July 2013 | | extant | |
| Papua New Guinea Lae | 1 July 2013 | | extant | |
| Peru Huancayo | 1 July 2013 | | extant | |
| Peru Iquitos | 1 July 2013 | | extant | |
| Philippines Cavite | 1 July 2013 | | extant | |
| Philippines Cebu East* | 1 July 2013 | | extant | |
| Philippines Legazpi | 1 July 2013 | | extant | |
| Philippines Urdaneta | 1 July 2013 | | extant | |
| Ukraine Lviv | 1 July 2013 | | 1 July 2018 | |
| Utah Salt Lake City East* | 1 July 2013 | Utah Salt Lake City 2019 | extant | |
| Virginia Chesapeake | 1 July 2013 | | 1 July 2019 | |
| Washington Federal Way | 1 July 2013 | | 1 July 2018 | |
| Washington Vancouver | 1 July 2013 | | extant | |
| Côte d'Ivoire Abidjan West | 1 July 2014 | | extant | |
| ROC Brazzaville | 1 July 2014 | | extant | |
| Buenos Aires East | 1 July 2015 | | extant | |
| Argentina Santa Fe | 1 July 2015 | | extant | |
| Bolivia La Paz El Alto | 1 July 2015 | | extant | |
| California Modesto | 1 July 2015 | | 1 July 2018 | |
| Costa Rica San Jose West | 1 July 2015 | | extant | |
| Peru Trujillo South | 1 July 2015 | | extant | |
| Portugal Porto | 1 July 2015 | | 1 July 2018 | |
| Trinidad Tobago | 1 July 2015 | Trinidad Port of Spain 2018; Guyana Georgetown 2023 | extant | |
| Utah Logan | 1 July 2015 | | 1 July 2018 | |
| Utah Orem | 1 July 2015 | | extant | |
| Washington Yakima | 1 July 2015 | | extant | |
| Vietnam Hanoi | 1 Mar 2016 | | extant | |
| DRC Mbuji-Mayi | 1 July 2016 | | extant | |
| Nigeria Owerri | 1 July 2016 | | extant | |
| SLC Headquarters | 1 Jan 2017 | | extant | |
| Brazil Rio de Janeiro South | 28 June 2018 | | extant | |
| Côte d'Ivoire Yamoussoukro | 28 June 2018 | | extant | |
| Nigeria Ibadan | 28 June 2018 | | extant | |
| Philippines Cabanatuan* | 28 June 2018 | | extant | |
| Zimbabwe Bulawayo | 28 June 2018 | | extant | |
| DRC Kinshasa East | 28 June 2019 | | extant | |
| Philippines Antipolo | 28 June 2019 | | extant | |
| Guatemala Antigua | 1 July 2019 | | extant | |
| Peru Limatambo | 1 July 2019 | | extant | |
| Brazil Recife South* | 1 July 2020 | | extant | |
| Cameroon Yaoundé* | 1 July 2020 | | extant | |
| Ecuador Guayaquil East | 1 July 2020 | | extant | |
| Ethiopia Addis Ababa | 1 July 2020 | | extant | |
| Tanzania Dar es Salaam | 1 July 2020 | | extant | |
| Texas Austin | 1 July 2020 | | extant | |
| Texas Dallas East | 1 July 2020 | | extant | |
| Tonga Outer Islands | 1 Jul 2021 | | 1 Jul 2022 | note Created to help deal with travel restrictions during a worldwide pandemic. At time of creation it was announced that the new mission would only operate for one year. |
| Mozambique Beira | 13 Aug 2021 | | extant | |
| Hawaii Laie | 3 Jan 2022 | | extant | |
| Rwanda Kigali | 30 June 2022 | | extant | |
| England Bristol | July 2022 | | extant | |
| Spain Madrid North | 9 Aug 2022 | | extant | |
| South Africa Pretoria | 28 June 2023 | | extant | |
| DRC Kananga | 29 June 2023 | | extant | |
| Nigeria Abuja | 29 June 2023 | | extant | |
| Côte d'Ivoire Abidjan North | 30 June 2023 | | extant | |
| Nigeria Aba* | 30 June 2023 | | extant | |
| Romania Bucharest | 1 July 2023 | | extant | |
| DRC Kinshasa South | 1 July 2024 | | extant | |
| DRC Kolwezi | 1 July 2024 | | extant | |
| Kenya Nairobi East | 1 July 2024 | | extant | |
| Madagascar Antananarivo North | 1 July 2024 | | extant | |
| Ghana Accra North | 1 July 2024 | | extant | |
| Ghana Takoradi | 1 July 2024 | | extant | |
| Nigeria Calabar | 1 July 2024 | | extant | |
| Nigeria Port Harcourt North | 1 July 2024 | | extant | |
| Sierra Leone Bo | 1 July 2024 | | extant | |
| Cambodia Phnom Penh East | 1 July 2024 | | extant | |
| Thailand Bangkok East | 1 July 2024 | | extant | |
| Japan Sendai | 1 July 2024 | | extant | |
| Brazil Manaus South | 1 July 2024 | | extant | |
| DR Santo Domingo North | 1 July 2024 | | extant | |
| Germany Hamburg | 1 July 2024 | | extant | |
| Portugal Porto | 1 July 2024 | | extant | |
| México Mexicali | 1 July 2024 | | extant | |
| México Puebla East | 1 July 2024 | | extant | |
| Montana Missoula | 1 July 2024 | | extant | |
| Florida Tallahassee | 1 July 2024 | | extant | |
| South Carolina Charleston | 1 July 2024 | | extant | |
| Nevada Henderson | 1 July 2024 | | extant | |
| Texas Dallas South | 1 July 2024 | | extant | |
| Texas El Paso | 1 July 2024 | | extant | |
| California Modesto | 1 July 2024 | | extant | |
| Philippines Dumaguete | 1 July 2024 | | extant | |
| Philippines General Santos | 1 July 2024 | | extant | |
| Philippines Tuguegarao | 1 July 2024 | | extant | |
| Bolivia Cochabamba South | 1 July 2024 | | extant | |
| Ecuador Quito West | 1 July 2024 | | extant | |
| Peru Lima Northeast | 1 July 2024 | | extant | |
| Argentina Tucumán | 1 July 2024 | | extant | |
| Chile La Serena | 1 July 2024 | | extant | |
| Utah Salt Lake City East* | 1 July 2024 | | extant | |
| Utah Saratoga Springs | 1 July 2024 | | extant | |
| Utah Spanish Fork | 1 July 2024 | | extant | |
| EC Turkic and Persian Speaking | 1 July 2025 | | extant | |
| DRC Kinshasa North | 1 July 2026 | | extant | |
| DRC Mwene-Ditu | 1 July 2026 | | extant | |
| Kenya Kisumu | 1 July 2026 | | extant | |
| Uganda Kampala East | 1 July 2026 | | extant | |
| Angola Luanda North | 1 July 2026 | | extant | |
| Malawi Lilongwe | 1 July 2026 | | extant | |
| Mozambique Nampula | 1 July 2026 | | extant | |
| South Africa East London | 1 July 2026 | | extant | |
| Zimbabwe Harare West | 1 July 2026 | | extant | |
| Cote d’Ivoire Abidjan South | 1 July 2026 | | extant | |
| Cote d’Ivoire Daloa | 1 July 2026 | | extant | |
| Ghana Accra South | 1 July 2026 | | extant | |
| Ghana Sunyani | 1 July 2026 | | extant | |
| Liberia Monrovia West | 1 July 2026 | | extant | |
| Senegal Dakar | 1 July 2026 | | extant | |
| Togo Lome | 1 July 2026 | | extant | |
| Mongolia Ulaanbaatar West | 1 July 2026 | | extant | |
| Brazil Guarulhos | 1 July 2026 | | extant | |
| Brazil Sao Bernardo | 1 July 2026 | | extant | |
| Brazil Sorocaba | 1 July 2026 | | extant | |
| Canada Halifax | 1 July 2026 | | extant | note reorganization of the mission of the same name that was discontinued in 2019 |
| Canada Toronto East | 1 July 2026 | | extant | note reorganization of the mission of the same name that was discontinued in 2011 |
| France Paris South | 1 July 2026 | | extant | |
| Greece Athens | 1 July 2026 | | extant | note reorganization of the mission of the same name that was discontinued in 2018 |
| Spain Madrid East | 1 July 2026 | | extant | |
| Cape Verde Mindelo | 1 July 2026 | | extant | |
| Mexico Tula | 1 July 2026 | | extant | |
| Australia Brisbane South | 1 July 2026 | | extant | |
| Papua New Guinea Daru | 1 July 2026 | | extant | |
| Papua New Guinea Madang | 1 July 2026 | | extant | |
| Samoa Apia East | 1 July 2026 | | extant | |
| Solomon Islands Honiara | 1 July 2026 | | extant | |
| Philippines Lingayen | 1 July 2026 | | extant | |
| Philippines Lipa | 1 July 2026 | | extant | |
| Philippines Ormoc | 1 July 2026 | | extant | |
| Philippines Ozamiz | 1 July 2026 | | extant | |
| Philippines Puerto Princesa | 1 July 2026 | | extant | |
| Peru Lima Northwest | 1 July 2026 | | extant | |
| Peru Tacna | 1 July 2026 | | extant | |
| Paraguay Asunción South | 1 July 2026 | | extant | |
| Uruguay Salto | 1 July 2026 | | extant | |
| Missouri Kansas City | 1 July 2026 | | extant | |
| Wyoming Cheyenne | 1 July 2026 | | extant | |
| Indiana Fort Wayne | 1 July 2026 | | extant | |
| Virginia Norfolk | 1 July 2026 | | extant | |
| Mississippi Jackson | 1 July 2026 | | extant | |
| Arizona Phoenix East | 1 July 2026 | | extant | |
| Oklahoma Tulsa | 1 July 2026 | | extant | |
| Texas Dallas North | 1 July 2026 | | extant | |
| Texas Houston North | 1 July 2026 | | extant | |
| Texas San Antonio South | 1 July 2026 | | extant | |
| California Carlsbad | 1 July 2026 | | extant | |
| California Ontario | 1 July 2026 | | extant | |
| California Victorville | 1 July 2026 | | extant | |
| Idaho Coeur d’Alene | 1 July 2026 | | extant | |

List of Tables
| List | Description |
|---|---|
| By country/territory | List of missions in each country/territory |
| By continent | List missions by continent. |
| By date of formation | List missions by date of formation with other information listed |
| By Area (LDS Church) | Missions listed for each LDS Church Area |

== By country/territory ==
List of missions within each country, territory or dependency. Africa North (AN), North America à(NA), and South America (SA) are abbreviated for concise column and reduction of row height for most rows.

| Country/territory | Area | Missions |
|---|---|---|
| Afghanistan | Middle East/ AN | No Mission |
| Albania | Europe Central | Albania Tirana |
| Algeria | Middle East/ AN | No Mission |
| Andaman and Nicobar Islands | Asia | India Bengaluru |
| Andorra | Europe Central | Spain Barcelona |
| Angola | Africa South | Angola Luanda North; Angola Luanda South |
| Anguilla | Caribbean | Barbados Bridgetown |
| Antigua and Barbuda | Caribbean | Puerto Rico San Juan |
| Argentina | SA South | Argentina Bahía Blanca; Argentina Buenos Aires East; Argentina Buenos Aires North; Argentina Buenos Aires South; Argentina Buenos Aires West; Argentina Comodoro Rivadavia; Argentina Córdoba; Argentina Mendoza; Argentina Neuquén; Argentina Resistencia; Argentina Rosario; Argentina Salta; Argentina Santa Fe; Argentina Tucuman |
| Armenia | Eurasian | Armenia/Georgia |
| Aruba | Caribbean | Guyana Georgetown |
| Australia | Pacific | Australia Adelaide; Australia Brisbane North; Australia Brisbane South; Australia Melbourne; Australia Perth; Australia Sydney |
| Austria | Europe Central | Alpine German-Speaking |
| Azerbaijan | Europe Central | Europe Central Turkic and Persian-Speaking |
| Azores | Europe North | Portugal Lisbon |
| (The Bahamas) Bahamas | Caribbean | Jamaica Kingston |
| Bahrain | Middle East/ AN | No Mission - Manama Bahrain Stake |
| Bangladesh | Asia | India New Delhi |
| Barbados | Caribbean | Barbados Bridgetown |
| Belarus | Eurasian | Russia Moscow |
| Balearic Islands | Europe Central | Spain Barcelona |
| Belgium | Europe Central | Belgium/Netherlands; France Paris North |
| Belize | Central America | Guatemala Cobán/Belize |
| Benin | Africa West | Benin Cotonou |
| Bermuda | NA Northeast | New York New York City |
| Bhutan | Asia | India New Delhi |
| Bolivia | SA Northwest | Bolivia Cochabamba North; Bolivia Cochabamba South; Bolivia La Paz; Bolivia La Paz El Alto; Bolivia Santa Cruz; Bolivia Santa Cruz North |
| Bonaire | Caribbean | Guyana Georgetown |
| Bosnia and Herzegovina | Europe Central | Adriatic North |
| Botswana | Africa South | Botswana/Namibia |
| Brazil | Brazil | Brazil Belém; Brazil Belo Horizonte; Brazil Brasília; Brazil Campinas; Brazil Cuiabá; Brazil Curitiba; Brazil Curitiba South; Brazil Florianópolis; Brazil Fortaleza; Brazil Fortaleza East; Brazil Goiânia; Brazil Guarulhos; Brazil João Pessoa; Brazil Juiz de Fora; Brazil Londrina; Brazil Maceió; Brazil Manaus North; Brazil Manaus South; Brazil Natal; Brazil Piracicaba; Brazil Porto Alegre North; Brazil Porto Alegre South; Brazil Recife; Brazil Recife South; Brazil Ribeirão Preto; Brazil Rio de Janeiro North; Brazil Rio de Janeiro South; Brazil Salvador; Brazil Salvador South; Brazil Santa Maria; Brazil Santos; Brazil São Bernardo; Brazil São Paulo East; Brazil São Paulo West; Brazil São Paulo Interlagos; Brazil São Paulo North; Brazil São Paulo South; Brazil Sorocaba; Brazil Teresina; Brazil Vitória |
| British Indian Ocean Territory | Asia | India Bengaluru |
| Brunei | Asia | Singapore |
| Bulgaria | Europe Central | Sofia Bulgaria |
| Burkina Faso | Africa West | No mission - Africa West Area Branch |
| Burundi | Africa Central | Rwanda Kigali |
| Cambodia | Asia | Cambodia Phnom Penh East; Cambodia Phnom Penh West |
| Cameroon | Africa Central | Cameroon Yaounde |
| Canada | North America | Canada Calgary; Canada Edmonton; Canada Halifax; Canada Montreal; Canada Toronto East; Canada Toronto West; Canada Vancouver; Canada Winnipeg |
| Canary Islands | Europe Central | Spain Madrid North |
| Cape Verde | Europe North | Cape Verde Praia; Cape Verde Mindelo |
| Cayman Islands | Caribbean | Jamaica Kingston |
| Central African Republic | Africa Central | Cameroon Yaounde |
| Ceuta | Europe Central | Spain Madrid South |
| Chad | Africa West | No Mission - Africa West Area Branch |
| Chile | SA South | Chile Antofagasta; Chile Concepción; Chile Concepción South; Chile La Serena; Chile Puerto Montt; Chile Rancagua; Chile Santiago East; Chile Santiago North; Chile Santiago South; Chile Santiago West; Chile Viña del Mar |
| China | Asia | China Hong Kong (Hong Kong and Macau) |
| Colombia | SA Northwest | Colombia Barranquilla; Colombia Bogotá North; Colombia Bogotá South; Colombia Cali; Colombia Medellin |
| Comoros | Africa South | Madagascar Antananarivo North |
| (Democratic Republic of the Congo) Congo, Democratic Republic | Africa Central | Democratic Republic of the Congo Kananga; Democratic Republic of the Congo Kinshasa East; Democratic Republic of the Congo Kinshasa North; Democratic Republic of the Congo Kinshasa South; Democratic Republic of the Congo Kinshasa West; Democratic Republic of the Congo Kolwezi; Democratic Republic of the Congo Lubumbashi; Democratic Republic of the Congo Mbuji-Mayi; Democratic Republic of the Congo Mwene-Ditu; Rwanda Kigali |
| (Republic of the Congo) Congo, Republic | Africa Central | Republic of the Congo Brazzaville |
| Cook Islands | Pacific | New Zealand Auckland |
| Corsica | Europe Central | France Lyon |
| Costa Rica | Central America | Costa Rica San José East; Costa Rica San José West |
| Croatia | Europe Central | Adriatic North |
| Cuba | Caribbean | Dominican Republic Santo Domingo East |
| Curaçao | Caribbean | Guyana Georgetown |
| Cyprus | Europe Central | Greece Athens |
| Czech Republic | Europe Central | Czech/Slovak |
| Denmark | Europe North | Denmark Copenhagen |
| Djibouti | Africa Central | No mission |
| Dominica | Caribbean | Puerto Rico San Juan |
| Dominican Republic | Caribbean | Dominican Republic Santiago; Dominican Republic Santo Domingo East; Dominican Republic Santo Domingo North; Dominican Republic Santo Domingo West |
| Easter Island | SA South | Chile Santiago North |
| Ecuador | SA Northwest | Ecuador Guayaquil East; Ecuador Guayaquil North; Ecuador Guayaquil South; Ecuador Guayaquil West; Ecuador Quito North; Ecuador Quito South; Ecuador Quito West |
| Egypt | Middle East/ AN | No Mission - Cairo Egypt District |
| El Salvador | Central America | El Salvador San Salvador East; El Salvador San Salvador West; El Salvador Santa Ana |
| England | Europe North | England Birmingham; England Bristol; England Leeds; England London; England Manchester |
| Equatorial Guinea | Africa Central | Cameroon Yaounde |
| Eritrea | Africa Central | No mission |
| Estonia | Europe North | Baltic |
| Eswatini | Africa South | South Africa Durban |
| Ethiopia | Africa Central | Ethiopia Addis Ababa |
| (Fiji) Falkland Islands | SA South | Chile Puerto Montt |
| Fiji | Pacific | Fiji Suva |
| Finland | Europe North | Finland Helsinki |
| France | Europe Central | France Lyon; France Paris North; France Paris South |
| French Guiana | Caribbean | Barbados Bridgetown |
| French Polynesia | Pacific | Tahiti Papeete |
| Gabon | Africa Central | Cameroon Yaounde |
| (Galápagos Province) Galápagos Islands | SA Northwest | Ecuador Guayaquil East |
| (The Gambia) Gambia | Africa West | Senegal Dakar |
| (Georgia (country)) Georgia | Eurasian | Armenia/Georgia |
| Germany | Europe Central | Alpine German-Speaking; Germany Berlin; Germany Frankfurt; Germany Hamburg |
| Ghana | Africa West | Ghana Accra East; Ghana Accra North; Ghana Accra South; Ghana Accra West; Ghana Cape Coast; Ghana Kumasi; Ghana Sunyani; Ghana Takoradi |
| Gibraltar | Europe Central | Spain Madrid South |
| Greece | Europe Central | Greece Athens |
| Grenada | Caribbean | Barbados Bridgetown |
| Guam | Asia North | Micronesia Guam |
| Guadeloupe | Caribbean | Barbados Bridgetown |
| Guatemala | Central America | Guatemala Antigua; Guatemala Cobán/Belize; Guatemala Guatemala City Central; Guatemala Guatemala City East; Guatemala Guatemala City South; Guatemala Quetzaltenango; Guatemala Retalhuleu |
| Guernsey | Europe North | England Bristol |
| Guinea | Africa West | Senegal Dakar |
| Guinea-Bissau | Europe North | Cape Verde Praia |
| Guyana | Caribbean | Guyana Georgetown |
| Haiti | Caribbean | Haiti Port-au-Prince |
| Honduras | Central America | Honduras Comayaguela Mission; Honduras San Pedro Sula East; Honduras San Pedro Sula West; Honduras Tegucigalpa |
| Hong Kong | Asia | China Hong Kong |
| Hungary | Europe Central | Hungary Budapest |
| Iceland | Europe North | Denmark Copenhagen |
| India | Asia | India Bengaluru; India New Delhi |
| Indonesia | Asia | Indonesia Jakarta |
| Iraq | Middle East/ AN | No Mission |
| Iran | Middle East/ AN | No Mission |
| (Republic of Ireland) Ireland | Europe North | Scotland/Ireland |
| Isle of Man | Europe North | England Manchester |
| Israel | Middle East/ AN | No Mission - Jerusalem District |
| Italy | Europe Central | Italy Milan; Italy Rome |
| Ivory Coast | Africa West | Côte d'Ivoire Abidjan East; Côte d'Ivoire Abidjan North; Cote d'Ivoire Abidjan South; Côte d'Ivoire Abidjan West; Cote d'Ivoire Daloa; Côte d'Ivoire Yamoussoukro |
| Jamaica | Caribbean | Jamaica Kingston |
| Japan | Asia North | Japan Fukuoka; Japan Kobe; Japan Nagoya; Japan Sapporo; Japan Sendai; Japan Tokyo North; Japan Tokyo South |
| Jersey | Europe North | England Bristol |
| Jordan | Middle East/ AN | No Mission - Cairo Egypt District |
| Juan Fernández Islands | SA | Chile Santiago North |
| Kenya | Africa Central | Kenya Kisumu; Kenya Nairobi East; Kenya Nairobi West |
| Kazakhstan | Eurasian | Russia Yekaterinburg |
| Kiribati | Pacific | Marshall Islands/Kiribati |
| Kuwait | Middle East/ AN | No Mission - Manama Bahrain Stake |
| Kosovo | Europe Central | Albania Tirana |
| Kyrgyzstan | Eurasian | Russia Yekaterinburg |
| Laos | Asia | Thailand Bangkok East |
| Latvia | Europe North | Baltic |
| Lebanon | Middle East/ AN | No Mission - Beirut Branch |
| Lesotho | Africa South | South Africa Johannesburg |
| Liberia | Africa West | Liberia Monrovia East; Liberia Monrovia West |
| Libya | Middle East/ AN | No Mission |
| Liechtenstein | Europe Central | Alpine German-Speaking |
| Lithuania | Europe North | Baltic |
| (Luxembourg) Luxemburg | Europe Central | France Paris North |
| Macau | Asia | China Hong Kong |
| Madagascar | Africa South | Madagascar Antananarivo North; Madagascar Antananarivo South |
| Malawi | Africa South | Malawi Lilongwe |
| Malaysia | Asia | Singapore |
| Maldives | Asia | India Bengaluru |
| Mali | Africa West | Senegal Dakar |
| Malta | Europe Central | Italy Rome |
| Marshall Islands | Pacific | Marshall Islands/Kiribati |
| Madeira | Europe North | Portugal Lisbon; Portugal Porto |
| Martinique | Caribbean | Barbados Bridgetown |
| Mauritania | Africa West | No Mission - Africa West Area Branch |
| Mauritius | Africa South | Madagascar Antananarivo North |
| Melilla | Europe Central | Spain Madrid South |
| Mexico | Mexico | Mexico Aguascalientes; Mexico Cancún; Mexico Chihuahua; Mexico Ciudad Juárez; Mexico Cuautla; Mexico Cuernavaca; Mexico Culiacán; Mexico Guadalajara; Mexico Guadalajara East; Mexico Hermosillo; Mexico Mérida; Mexico Mexicali; Mexico Mexico City East; Mexico Mexico City North; Mexico Mexico City Northwest; Mexico Mexico City South; Mexico Mexico City Southeast; Mexico Mexico City West; Mexico Monterrey East; Mexico Monterrey West; Mexico Oaxaca; Mexico Pachuca; Mexico Puebla East; Mexico Puebla North; Mexico Puebla South; Mexico Querétaro; Mexico Saltillo; Mexico Tampico; Mexico Tijuana; Mexico Torreón; Mexico Tula; Mexico Tuxtla Gutiérrez; Mexico Veracruz; Mexico Villahermosa; Mexico Xalapa |
| (Federated States of Micronesia) Micronesia | Asia North | Micronesia Guam |
| Moldova | Unassigned | Ukraine Dnipro; Ukraine Kyiv/Moldova |
| Monaco | Europe Central | France Lyon |
| Mongolia | Asia North | Mongolia Ulaanbaatar East; Mongolia Ulaanbaatar West |
| Montenegro | Europe Central | Adriatic North |
| Montserrat | Caribbean | Puerto Rico San Juan |
| Morocco | Middle East/ AN | No Mission - Cairo Egypt District |
| Mozambique | Africa South | Mozambique Beira; Mozambique Maputo; Mozambique Nampula |
| Myanmar | Asia | Thailand Bangkok West |
| Namibia | Africa South | Botswana/Namibia |
| Nauru | Pacific | Marshall Islands/Kiribati |
| Nepal | Asia | India New Delhi |
| Netherlands | Europe Central | Belgium/Netherlands |
| New Caledonia | Pacific | Vanuatu Port Vila |
| New Zealand | Pacific | New Zealand Auckland; New Zealand Hamilton; New Zealand Wellington |
| Nicaragua | Central America | Nicaragua Managua North; Nicaragua Managua South |
| Niger | Africa West | No Mission - Africa West Area Branch |
| Nigeria | Africa West | Nigeria Aba (Announced to be created July 2023); Nigeria Abuja (Announced to be created July 2023); Nigeria Benin City; Nigeria Calabar; Nigeria Enugu; Nigeria Ibadan; Nigeria Lagos; Nigeria Owerri; Nigeria Port Harcourt North; Nigeria Port Harcourt South; Nigeria Uyo |
| Niue | Pacific | New Zealand Auckland |
| Northern Ireland | Europe North | Scotland/Ireland |
| North Macedonia | Europe Central | Bulgaria Sofia |
| Northern Mariana Islands | Asia North | Micronesia Guam |
| Norway | Europe North | Norway Oslo |
| Oman | Middle East/ AN | No Mission - Abu Dhabi United Arab Emirates Stake |
| Pakistan | Asia | Pakistan Service Mission |
| Palau | Asia North | Micronesia Guam |
| Panama | Central America | Panama Panama City |
| Papua New Guinea | Pacific | Papua New Guinea Daru; Papua New Guinea Lae; Papua New Guinea Madang; Papua New Guinea Port Moresby |
| Paraguay | SA South | Paraguay Asunción East; Paraguay Asunción North; Paraguay Asunción South |
| Peru | SA Northwest | Peru Arequipa; Peru Chiclayo; Peru Cusco; Peru Huancayo; Peru Iquitos; Peru Lima Central; Peru Lima East; Peru Lima North; Peru Lima Northeast; Peru Lima Northwest; Peru Lima South; Peru Lima West; Peru Limatambo; Peru Piura; Peru Tacna; Peru Trujillo North; Peru Trujillo South |
| Philippines | Philippines | Philippines Antipolo; Philippines Angeles; Philippines Bacolod; Philippines Baguio; Philippines Butuan; Philippines Cabanatuan; Philippines Cagayan de Oro; Philippines Cauayan; Philippines Cavite; Philippines Cebu; Philippines Cebu East; Philippines Davao; Philippines Dumaguete; Philippines General Santos; Philippines Iloilo; Philippines Laoag; Philippines Legazpi; Philippines Lingayen; Philippines Lipa; Philippines Manila; Philippines Naga; Philippines Olongapo; Philippines Ormoc; Philippines Ozamiz; Philippines Puerto Princesa; Philippines Quezon City; Philippines Quezon City North; Philippines San Pablo; Philippines Tacloban; Philippines Tuguegarao; Philippines Urdaneta |
| Poland | Europe Central | Poland Warsaw |
| Portugal | Europe North | Portugal Lisbon |
| Réunion | Africa South | Madagascar Antananarivo North |
| Puerto Rico | Caribbean | Puerto Rico San Juan |
| Qatar | Middle East/ AN | No Mission - Abu Dabi United Arab Emirates Stake |
| Romania | Europe Central | Romania Bucharest |
| Russia | Eurasian | Russia Moscow; Russia Novosibirsk; Russia Yekaterinburg |
| Rwanda | Africa Central | Rwanda Kigali |
| Saint Kitts and Nevis | Caribbean | Puerto Rico San Juan |
| Saint Lucia | Caribbean | Barbados Bridgetown |
| (Saint Vincent and the Grenadines) St Pierre and Miquelon | Canada | Canada Halifax |
| (Saint Vincent and the Grenadines) St Vincent and the Grenadines | Caribbean | Barbados Bridgetown |
| Samoa | Pacific | Samoa Apia East; Samoa Apia West |
| (American Samoa) Samoa, American | Pacific | Samoa Apia East |
| San Marino | Europe Central | Italy Milan |
| São Tomé and Príncipe | Africa South | Angola Luanda North |
| Sardinia | Europe Central | Italy Rome |
| Saudi Arabia | Middle East/ AN | No Mission - Manama Bahrain Stake |
| Scotland | Europe North | Scotland/Ireland |
| Senegal | Africa West | Senegal Dakar |
| Serbia | Europe Central | Adriatic North |
| Seychelles | Africa Central | Kenya Nairobi East |
| Sierra Leone | Africa West | Sierra Leone Bo; Sierra Leone Freetown |
| Singapore | Asia | Singapore |
| Slovakia | Europe Central | Czech/Slovak |
| Slovenia | Europe Central | Adriatic North |
| Solomon Islands | Pacific | Solomon Islands Honiara |
| Somalia | Africa Central | No Mission |
| South Africa | Africa South | South Africa Cape Town; South Africa Durban; South Africa East London; South Africa Johannesburg; South Africa Pretoria |
| South Korea | Asia North | Korea Busan; Korea Seoul; Korea Seoul South |
| South Sudan | Africa Central | Uganda Kampala West |
| Spain | Europe Central | Spain Barcelona; Spain Madrid East; Spain Madrid North; Spain Madrid South |
| Sri Lanka | Asia | India Bengaluru |
| Sudan | Middle East/ AN | No Mission |
| Suriname | Caribbean | Guyana Georgetown |
| Sweden | Europe North | Sweden Stockholm |
| Syria | Middle East/ AN | No Mission - Meetinghouse in Damascus |
| Switzerland | Europe Central | Alpine German-Speaking; France Lyon; Italy Milan |
| Taiwan | Asia | Taiwan Taichung; Taiwan Taipei |
| Tajikistan | Europe Central | Europe Central Turkic and Persian-Speaking |
| Tanzania | Africa Central | Tanzania Dar es Salaam |
| Thailand | Asia | Thailand Bangkok East; Thailand Bangkok West |
| Togo | Africa West | Togo Lomé |
| Tokelau | Pacific | Samoa Apia West |
| Tonga | Pacific | Tonga Nuku'alofa |
| Torres Strait Islands | Pacific | Australia Brisbane North |
| (Trinidad and Tobago) Guyana Georgetown | Caribbean | Guyana Georgetown |
| Tunisia | Middle East/ AN | No Mission |
| Turkey | Europe Central | Europe Central Turkic and Persian-Speaking |
| Turks and Caicos Islands | Caribbean | Jamaica Kingston |
| Turkmenistan | Europe Central | Europe Central Turkic and Persian-Speaking |
| Tuvalu | Pacific | Fiji Suva |
| Uganda | Africa Central | Uganda Kampala East; Uganda Kampala West |
| Ukraine | Unassigned | Ukraine Dnipro; Ukraine Kyiv/Moldova |
| United Arab Emirates | Middle East/ AN | No Mission - Abu Dhabi United Arab Emirates Stake |
| United Kingdom | Europe North | England Birmingham; England Bristol; England Leeds; England London; England Manchester; Scotland/Ireland |
| United States | North America | See separate United States table. |
| Uruguay | SA South | Uruguay Montevideo East; Uruguay Montevideo West; Uruguay Salto |
| Uzbekistan | Europe Central | Europe Central Turkic and Persian-Speaking |
| Vanuatu | Pacific | Vanuatu Port Vila |
| Vatican City | Europe Central | Italy Rome |
| Venezuela | Caribbean | Venezuela Barcelona; Venezuela Caracas; Venezuela Maracaibo; Venezuela Valencia |
| Vietnam | Asia | Vietnam Hanoi |
| (British Virgin Islands) Virgin Islands, British | Caribbean | Puerto Rico San Juan |
| (United States Virgin Islands) Virgin Islands, U.S. | Caribbean | Puerto Rico San Juan |
| Wales | Europe North | England Bristol; England Manchester |
| Western Sahara | Africa West | No Mission - Africa West Area Branch |
| Yemen | Middle East/ AN | No Mission - Manama Bahrain Stake |
| Zambia | Africa South | Zambia Lusaka |
| Zimbabwe | Africa South | Zimbabwe Bulawayo; Zimbabwe Harare East; Zimbabwe Harare West |

=== U.S. State ===
Missions in each state of the United States. Includes missions in other states covering stake(s) within the state.

| State | Area* | Missions |
|---|---|---|
| Alabama | US Southeast | Alabama Birmingham; Florida Tallahassee |
| Alaska | US West | Alaska Anchorage |
| Arizona | US Southwest | Arizona Flagstaff; Arizona Gilbert; Arizona Mesa; Arizona Phoenix East; Arizona Phoenix West; Arizona Tempe; Arizona Tucson; Nevada Henderson; New Mexico Farmington |
| Arkansas | US Southeast | Arkansas Bentonville; Arkansas Little Rock |
| California | US West | California Anaheim; California Arcadia; California Bakersfield; California Carlsbad; California Fresno; California Los Angeles; California Modesto; California Newport Beach; California Oakland/San Francisco; California Ontario; California Riverside; California Roseville; California Sacramento; California San Bernardino; California San Diego; California San Jose; California Santa Rosa; California Ventura; California Victorville; Nevada Reno |
| Colorado | US Central | Colorado Colorado Springs; Colorado Denver East; Colorado Denver West; Colorado Fort Collins; New Mexico Farmington |
| Connecticut | US Northeast | Massachusetts Boston; New York New York City |
| Delaware | US Northeast | Pennsylvania Philadelphia |
| (Washington, D.C.) District of Columbia | US Northeast | Washington DC North |
| Florida | US Southeast | Alabama Birmingham; Florida Fort Lauderdale; Florida Jacksonville; Florida Orlando; Florida Tallahassee; Florida Tampa |
| (Georgia (U.S. state)) Georgia | US Southeast | Florida Jacksonville; Florida Tallahassee; Georgia Atlanta; Georgia Atlanta North; South Carolina Charleston; South Carolina Columbia |
| Hawaii | US West | Hawaii Honolulu; Hawaii Laie |
| Idaho | US Central | Idaho Boise; Idaho Coeur d’Alene; Idaho Idaho Falls; Idaho Pocatello; Utah Ogden |
| Illinois | US Central | Illinois Chicago Mission; Iowa Iowa City; Missouri St Louis |
| Indiana | US Northeast | Indiana Fort Wayne; Indiana Indianapolis; Kentucky Louisville |
| Iowa | US Central | Nebraska Omaha; Iowa Iowa City |
| Kansas | US Central | Kansas Wichita; Missouri Kansas City |
| Kentucky | US Southeast | Kentucky Louisville; Tennessee Nashville |
| Louisiana | US Southeast | Louisiana Baton Rouge; Mississippi Jackson |
| Maine | US Northeast | New Hampshire Manchester |
| Maryland | US Northeast | Maryland Baltimore; Washington D.C. North |
| Massachusetts | US Northeast | Massachusetts Boston; New Hampshire Manchester |
| Michigan | US Northeast | Michigan Detroit; Michigan Lansing |
| Minnesota | US Central | Minnesota Minneapolis |
| Mississippi | US Southeast | Arkansas Little Rock; Mississippi Jackson |
| Missouri | US Central | Arkansas Bentonville; Missouri Independence; Missouri Kansas City; Missouri St. Louis |
| Montana | US Central | Montana Billings; Montana Missoula; North Dakota Bismarck |
| Nebraska | US Central | Nebraska Omaha; North Dakota Bismarck; Colorado Fort Collins |
| Nevada | US Southwest | Nevada Henderson; Nevada Las Vegas; Nevada Las Vegas West; Nevada Reno; Utah St George |
| New Hampshire | US Northeast | New Hampshire Manchester |
| New Jersey | US Northeast | New Jersey Morristown; Pennsylvania Philadelphia |
| New Mexico | US Southwest | New Mexico Albuquerque; New Mexico Farmington; Texas El Paso; Texas Lubbock |
| (New York (state)) New York | US Northeast | New Jersey Morristown; New York New York City; New York Syracuse; Pennsylvania Pittsburgh |
| North Carolina | US Southeast | North Carolina Charlotte; North Carolina Raleigh; South Carolina Charleston |
| North Dakota | US Central | North Dakota Bismarck |
| Ohio | US Northeast | Michigan Detroit; Ohio Cincinnati; Ohio Columbus |
| Oklahoma | US Southwest | Oklahoma Oklahoma City; Oklahoma Tulsa |
| Oregon | US West | Idaho Boise; Oregon Eugene; Oregon Portland; Oregon Salem; Washington Kennewick; Washington Vancouver; Washington Yakima |
| Pennsylvania | US Northeast | Maryland Baltimore; Pennsylvania Philadelphia; Pennsylvania Pittsburgh |
| Rhode Island | US Northeast | Massachusetts Boston |
| South Carolina | US Southeast | North Carolina Charlotte; South Carolina Charleston; South Carolina Columbia |
| South Dakota | US Central | Nebraska Omaha; North Dakota Bismarck |
| Tennessee | US Southeast | Arkansas Little Rock; Tennessee Knoxville; Tennessee Nashville |
| Texas | US Southwest | Texas Austin; Texas Dallas East; Texas Dallas North; Texas Dallas South; Texas Dallas West; Texas El Paso; Texas Fort Worth; Texas Houston East; Texas Houston North; Texas Houston South; Texas Houston West; Texas Lubbock; Texas McAllen; Texas San Antonio North; Texas San Antonio South |
| Utah | Utah | New Mexico Farmington; Utah Layton; Utah Ogden; Utah Orem; Utah Provo; Utah Salt Lake City; Utah Salt Lake City Headquarters; Utah Salt Lake City West; Utah Salt Lake City South; Utah St. George |
| Vermont | US Northeast | New Hampshire Manchester |
| Virginia | US Northeast | Maryland Baltimore; Virginia Norfolk; Virginia Richmond; Washington D.C. South; West Virginia Charleston |
| (Washington (state)) Washington | US West | Washington Everett; Washington Kennewick; Washington Seattle; Washington Spokane; Washington Tacoma; Washington Vancouver; Washington Yakima |
| West Virginia | US Northeast | Maryland Baltimore; West Virginia Charleston |
| Wisconsin | US Central | Wisconsin Milwaukee |
| Wyoming | US Central | Idaho Pocatello; Montana Billings; Wyoming Cheyenne |

- The United States are divided into multiple areas which follow mission boundaries and do not necessarily follow state or provincial Boundaries. The dominant area within the state/province is listed under "Area" column.

== See also ==
- The Church of Jesus Christ of Latter-day Saints membership history
- The Church of Jesus Christ of Latter-day Saints membership statistics
