= The Church of Jesus Christ of Latter-day Saints in Massachusetts =

Church in Massachusetts

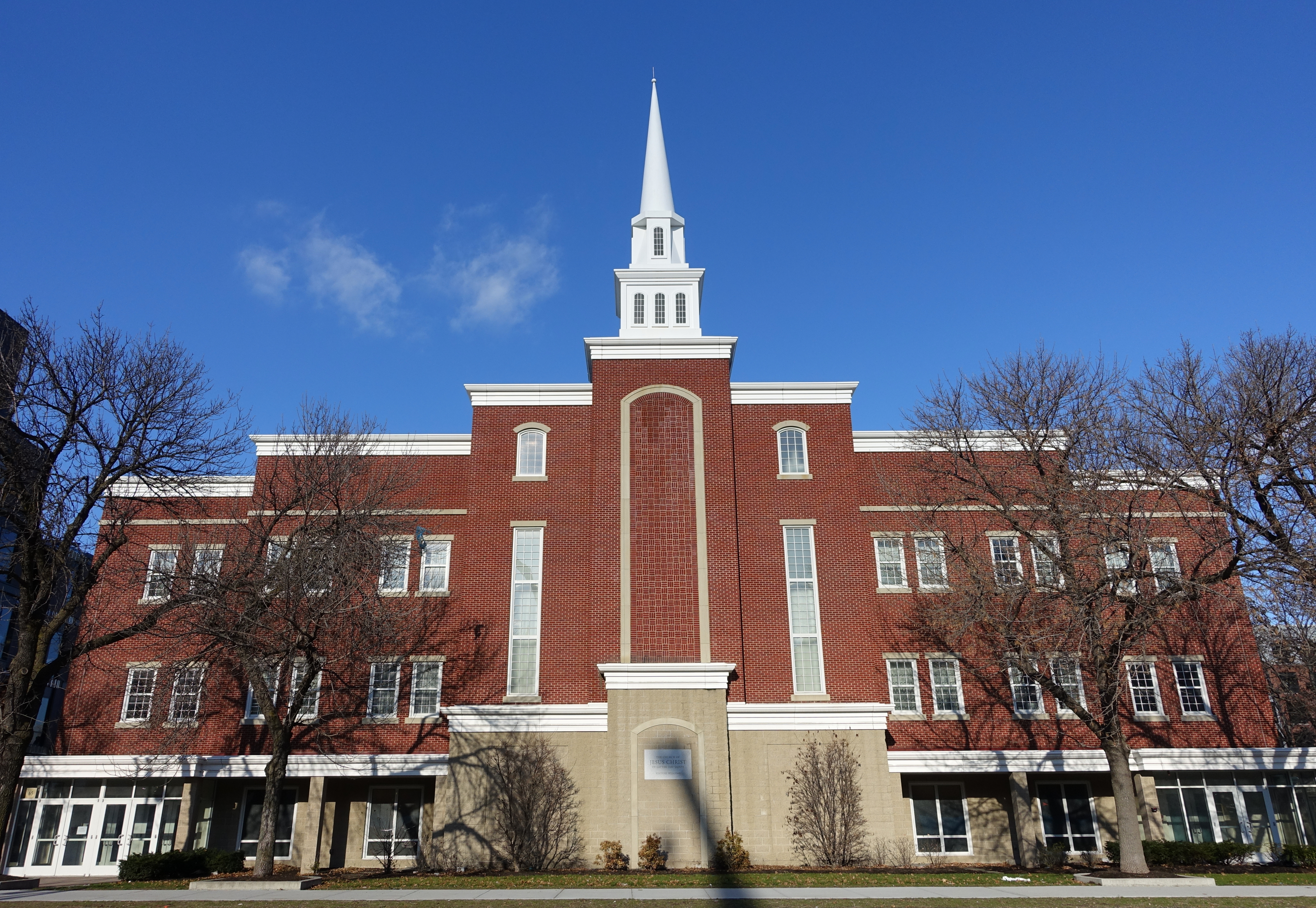
- A stake center and meetinghouse of The Church of Jesus Christ of Latter-day Saints in Cambridge, Massachusetts. The 36,000 s/f, two-story building includes 2 chapels, a multi-purpose recreation hall, classrooms, and local church offices.
- Area: US Northeast
- Members: 29,541 (2025)
- Stakes: 7
- Wards: 42
- Branches: 13
- Total Congregations: 55
- Missions: 1
- Temples: 1
- FamilySearch Centers: 18

The Church of Jesus Christ of Latter-day Saints in Massachusetts refers to the Church of Jesus Christ of Latter-day Saints (LDS Church) and its members in Massachusetts.

Official church membership as a percentage of general population was 0.39% in 2014. According to the 2014 Pew Forum on Religion & Public Life survey, roughly 1% of Bay Staters self-identify themselves most closely with the LDS Church. The LDS Church is the 11th largest denomination in Massachusetts.

== History ==
Membership in Massachusetts
Year	Membership
1930	350
1950	637
1970	5,253
1979	6,639
1989*	13,000
1999	21,106
2009	24,689
2019	28,040
2025	29,541
*Membership was published as a rounded number. Source: Wendall J. Ashton; Jim M. Wall, Deseret News, various years, Church Almanac State Information: Massachusetts

The nightly preachings of George J. Adams brought an audience of some 1,200 in Charlestown, Massachusetts, in 1843. At that time, there were some 14 branches (small congregations) of The Church of Jesus Christ of Latter-day Saints in the Boston area. Eleven years prior, the first missionaries for the Church arrived in Boston to organize congregations. Church President Joseph Smith passed through Boston on his way to Washington, D.C., in 1839. After President Smith was martyred in 1844, several members in Massachusetts joined the mass exodus west, and missionary work in the state slowed.

In 1894, one year after the area was reopened to missionaries, Church membership was 96. A decade later, missionaries encountered hostilities toward the Church during the highly publicized United States Senate hearings on Church leader and Senator-elect Reed Smoot, and police disallowed missionaries to hold open-air meetings. By 1930, membership was nearly 360, some of whom were recently returned missionaries studying at Harvard University. Cambridge, Massachusetts, became the headquarters for the New England States Mission. A Church building was dedicated in the area in 1956.

The Church completed and dedicated the Boston Massachusetts Temple in 2000, marking the 100th operating temple in the Church.

== Stakes ==
Temples in and near Massachusetts
Red = Operating
Blue = Under Construction
Yellow = announced
Black = Closed for Renovations

As of July 2026, Massachusetts had the following stakes (with the stake center in Massachusetts):

Stake	Organized	Mission	Temple District
Blackstone Valley Massachusetts	22 Oct 2017	Massachusetts Boston	Boston Massachusetts
Boston Massachusetts	20 May 1962	Massachusetts Boston	Boston Massachusetts
Cambridge Massachusetts	18 Oct 1998	Massachusetts Boston	Boston Massachusetts
Hingham Massachusetts	30 Oct 1981	Massachusetts Boston	Boston Massachusetts
North Shore Massachusetts	6 Nov 2016	Massachusetts Boston	Boston Massachusetts
Springfield Massachusetts	28 Jun 1987	New Hampshire Manchester	Hartford Connecticut
Worcester Massachusetts	30 August 2020	New Hampshire Manchester	Boston Massachusetts

== Missions ==
The Eastern States Mission was organized May 6, 1839. On September 24, 1937, the New England Mission was organized as a division of the Eastern States Mission. The mission was renamed Massachusetts Boston Mission on June 20, 1974 and is the only mission based in Massachusetts. Western portions of the state is served by the New Hampshire Manchester Mission.

== Temples ==
The Boston Massachusetts Temple was dedicated on October 1, 2000 by President Gordon B. Hinckley.

100. Boston Massachusetts Temple; Official website; News & images	
Location: Announced: Groundbreaking: Dedicated: Size: Style:	Belmont, Massachusetts, United States; September 30, 1995 by Gordon B. Hinckley; June 13, 1997 by Richard G. Scott; October 1, 2000 by Gordon B. Hinckley; 69,600 sq ft (6,470 m^{2}) on a 8-acre (3.2 ha) site Classic modern, single-spire design - designed by Tsoi/Kobus & Associates and Church A&E Services

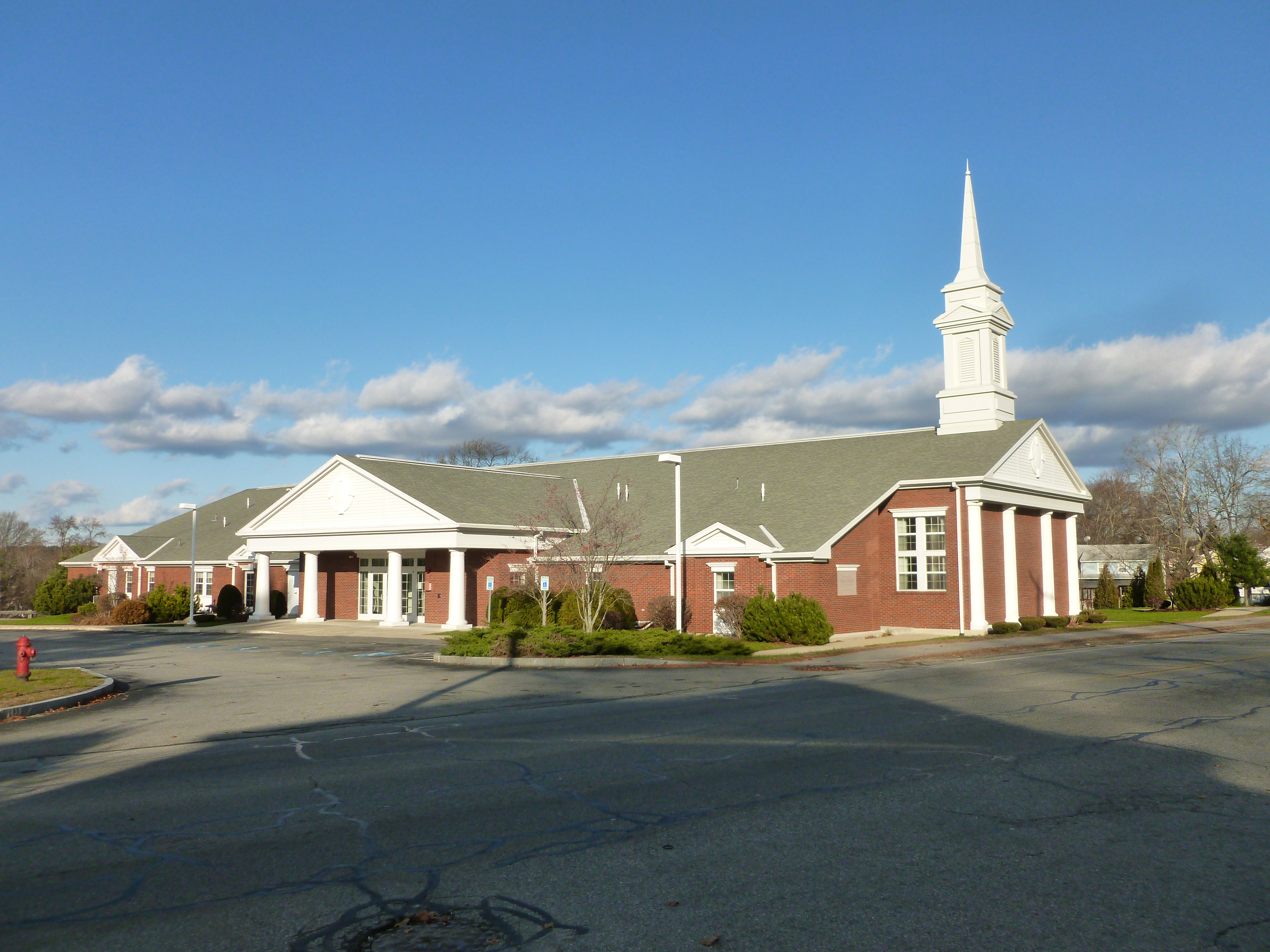
A Meetinghouse of The Church of Jesus Christ of Latter-day Saints in Lowell, Massachusetts. (Nashua New Hampshire Stake)
