= The Church of Jesus Christ of Latter-day Saints in Sierra Leone =

- Area: Africa West
- Members: 41,775 (2025)
- Stakes: 11
- Districts: 3
- Wards: 78
- Branches: 40
- Total congregations: 118
- Missions: 2
- Temples: 1 under construction
- FamilySearch Centers: 22

The Church of Jesus Christ of Latter-day Saints in Sierra Leone refers to the Church of Jesus Christ of Latter-day Saints (LDS Church) and its members in Sierra Leone. In 2025, Sierra Leone ranked as having the third most LDS Church members per capita in Africa, behind Cape Verde and Liberia.

== History ==
Membership in Sierra Leone
Year	Membership
1988	12
1989*	200
1995*	2,400
1999	3,564
2004	5,712
2009	8,054
2014	13,078
2019	22,787
2024	34,617
2025	41,775
*Membership was published as a rounded number.

The first official meeting of the LDS Church in Sierra Leone was held in Goderich in January 1988, with the first LDS missionaries arriving in May of that year. They were under the Liberia Monrovia Mission. A district was organized in Freetown in 1990. At various times in the 1990s, missionaries were withdrawn due to the civil war in the country. In 1991, the Liberia Monrovia Mission was discontinued and Sierra Leone was placed under the Accra Ghana Mission. The first LDS-built meetinghouse in the country was completed in Bo in 2004. In 2007, the Sierra Leone Freetown Mission was created covering both Sierra Leone and Liberia. In December 2012, Jeffrey R. Holland created the first LDS stake in Sierra Leone in Freetown. In 2013, Liberia was split off to be its own separate mission.

== Stakes and districts ==
The Freetown Sierra Leone Stake was organized on December 2, 2012, making it the 3,000th stake in the LDS Church. As of July 2026, Sierra Leone had the following stakes and districts:

Stakes and Districts

Stake/District	Organized	Mission
Bo Sierra Leone Durba Stake	20 Oct 2024	Sierra Leone Bo
Bo Sierra Leone East Stake	15 Sep 2019	Sierra Leone Bo
Bo Sierra Leone North Stake	12 Nov 2017	Sierra Leone Bo
Bo Sierra Leone West Stake	12 Nov 2017	Sierra Leone Bo
Freetown Sierra Leone East Stake	3 Dec 2017	Sierra Leone Freetown
Freetown Sierra Leone Hill Station Stake	10 Dec 2023	Sierra Leone Freetown
Freetown Sierra Leone Stake	2 Dec 2012	Sierra Leone Freetown
Kenema Sierra Leone Stake	24 Nov 2019	Sierra Leone Bo
Kenema Sierra Leone West Stake	12 Jul 2026	Sierra Leone Bo
Kissy Sierra Leone Stake	18 Jun 2017	Sierra Leone Freetown
Koidu Sierra Leone District	30 Mar 2025	Sierra Leone Bo
Kossoh Town Sierra Leone Stake	5 Dec 2021	Sierra Leone Freetown
Makeni Sierra Leone District	21 May 2017	Sierra Leone Freetown
Moriba Town Sierra Leone District	26 Jun 2022	Sierra Leone Bo
Wellington Sierra Leone Stake	10 Oct 2021	Sierra Leone Freetown

Congregations in Sierra Leone not part of a stake or district include:

- Moyamba Branch
- Njama Branch
- Sierra Leone Freetown Dispersed Members Unit
- Sierra Leone Bo Dispersed Members Unit

The Dispersed Members Units serves families and individuals in Sierra Leone that is not in proximity of a meetinghouse.

== Missions ==
- Sierra Leone Freetown, organized on July 1, 2007
- Sierra Bo, organized in June 2024

=== 2014 West Africa Ebola outbreak ===
After two of its members died during the 2014 West Africa Ebola outbreak, the LDS Church required its missionaries to remain in their apartments as a precautionary measure. Then on August 1, 2014 the LDS Church announced that it would transfer all of its 274 missionaries out of Sierra Leone and Liberia, thereby closing the Sierra Leone Freetown Mission for the duration of the outbreak.

== Temples ==
On October 5, 2019, the Freetown Sierra Leone Temple was announced by church president Russell M. Nelson.

238. Freetown Sierra Leone Temple (Under construction); Official website; News & images	
Location: Announced: Groundbreaking: Size:	Freetown, Sierra Leone; 5 October 2019 by Russell M. Nelson; 19 March 2022 by Hugo E. Martinez; 18,000 sq ft (1,700 m^{2}) on a 2.9-acre (1.2 ha) site

== See also ==
- Religion in Sierra Leone
