= The Church of Jesus Christ of Latter-day Saints in Cambodia =

Church in Cambodia

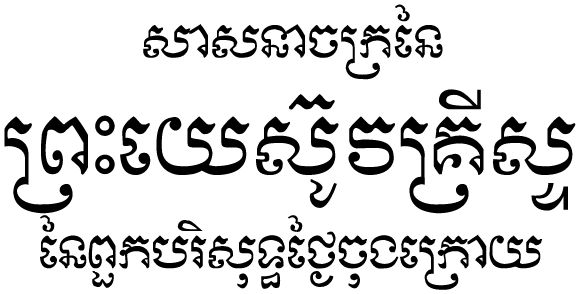
- (Logo in Khmer)

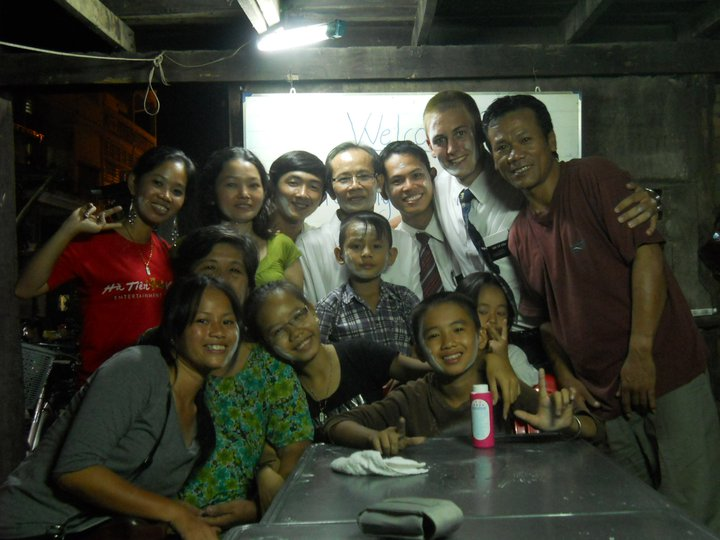
- A Family Home Evening of a Vietnamese family in Cambodia
- Area: Asia
- Members: 18,070 (2025)
- Stakes: 2
- Districts: 4
- Wards: 9
- Branches: 21
- Total congregations: 30
- Missions: 2
- Temples: 1 operating
- FamilySearch Centers: 12

The Church of Jesus Christ of Latter-day Saints in Cambodia refers to the Church of Jesus Christ of Latter-day Saints (LDS Church) and its members in the country of Cambodia. The first branch was organized in Phnom Penh in 1994. Since then, the church has grown to more than 18,000 members in 28 congregations. In October 2018, a temple was announced to be located in Phnom Penh.

== History ==
Membership In Cambodia
Year	Membership
1996	285
1999	1,018
2004	6,865
2009	8,908
2014	12,882
2019	15,187
2024	17,365
2025	18,070
Source: Jim M. Wall, Deseret News, various years, Church Almanac Country Information: Cambodia, Windall J. Ashton

On March 4, 1994, the LDS Church received legal recognition by the government of Cambodia. The first branch was organized later that year in Phnom Penh.

== Stakes and Districts ==
Stake Centers in Cambodia (November 2025)
Green = Stake
Orange = District

As of September 2026, the following stakes and districts existed in Cambodia:

Stake/District	Organized	Mission
Battambang Cambodia District	27 Jun 2010	Cambodia Phnom Penh West
Kampong Cham Cambodia District	19 Jun 2005	Cambodia Phnom Penh East
Phnom Penh Cambodia East District	26 Feb 2012	Cambodia Phnom Penh East
Phnom Penh Cambodia North Stake	28 Nov 1995	Cambodia Phnom Penh West
Phnom Penh Cambodia South Stake	1 Dec 2002	Cambodia Phnom Penh West
Siem Reap Cambodia District	22 Feb 2015	Cambodia Phnom Penh East

== Missions ==
When the Church was introduced in 1994, Cambodia was part of the Thailand Bangkok Mission. This mission was divided in July 1998 to form the Cambodia Phnom Penh Mission. This mission initially also included Vietnam until the mission was divided again to create the Vietnam Hanoi Mission in July 2016. The Cambodia Phnom Penh Mission mission boundaries is the same as the country's boundaries. The mission office is located in a meetinghouse at Building 2B Street 222 in Phnom Penh. In June 2024, the mission split into Cambodia Phnom Penh East and West Missions.

== Temples ==
Cambodia was part of the Hong Kong China Temple district until the completion of the Bangkok Thailand Temple in 2023. The Phnom Penh Cambodia Temple was announced on October 7, 2018, by Church President Russell M. Nelson. Groundbreaking was held September 18, 2021.

222. Phnom Penh Cambodia Temple; Official website; News & images	
Location: Announced: Groundbreaking: Dedicated: Size:	Phnom Penh, Cambodia; 7 October 2018 by Russell M. Nelson; 18 September 2021 by Veasna Kuonno Neang; 30 August 2026 by Patrick Kearon; 9,946 sq ft (924.0 m^{2}) on a 3.2-acre (1.3 ha) site

== See also ==
- Religion in Cambodia
