= The Church of Jesus Christ of Latter-day Saints in Venezuela =

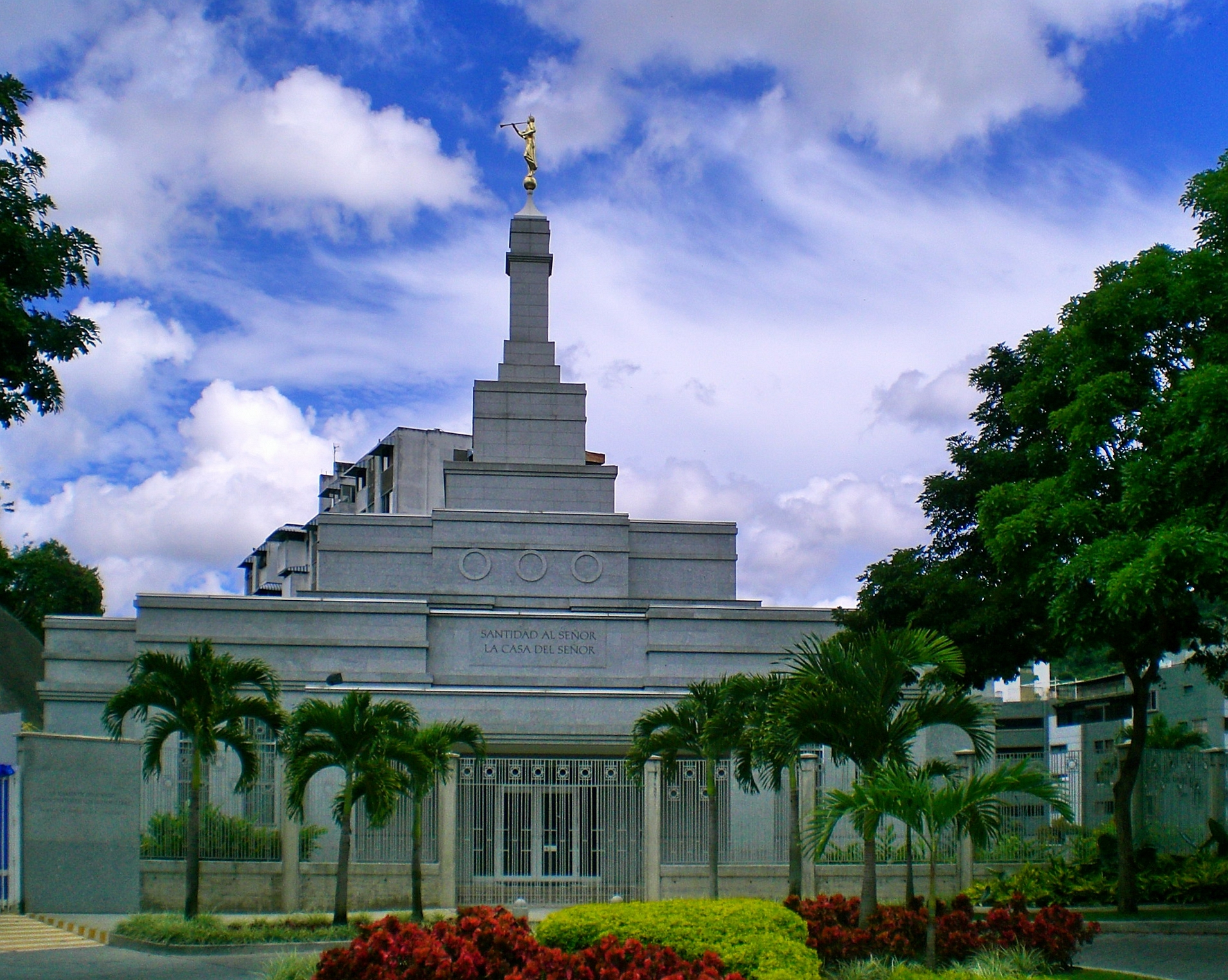
- The Caracas Venezuela Temple
- Area: Caribbean
- Members: 179,389 (2025)
- Stakes: 33
- Districts: 6
- Wards: 176
- Branches: 59
- Total congregations: 235
- Missions: 4
- Temples: 1 operating; 1 announced; 2 total
- FamilySearch Centers: 61

The Church of Jesus Christ of Latter-day Saints in Venezuela refers to the Church of Jesus Christ of Latter-day Saints (LDS Church) and its members in Venezuela. The first small branch was established in 1966. Since then, the LDS Church in Venezuela has grown to more than 175,000 members in 235 congregations.

== History ==
Membership in Venezuela
Year	Membership
1971	1,259
1975	3,119
1979	8,185
1985*	24,000
1989*	48,000
1995*	73,000
1999	89,484
2004	128,874
2009	146,987
2014	164,048
2019	168,539
2024	177,309
2025	179,389
*Membership was published as an estimate. Source: Wendall J. Ashton; Jim M. Wall, Deseret News, various years, Church Almanac Country Information: Venezuela

The first congregation was organized in November 1966, by Marion G. Romney.

On March 17, 2004, the LDS Church announced it would be removing the 152 missionaries in Venezuela and sending them to other missions in South America, the church announced Monday, due to political unrest. In February and March, riot police have clashed with anti-government demonstrators, with more than two dozen people killed.

== Stakes and districts ==
Stake/District	Organized	Mission
Barcelona Venezuela Stake	4 Jun 1989	Venezuela Barcelona
Barinas Venezuela Stake	18 Dec 2005	Venezuela Valencia
Barquisimeto Venezuela Obelisco Stake	23 Feb 2003	Venezuela Valencia
Barquisimeto Venezuela Stake	28 Aug 1994	Venezuela Valencia
Cabimas Venezuela Stake	23 Oct 2011	Venezuela Maracaibo
Cagua Venezuela Stake	28 May 2011	Venezuela Caracas
Caracas Venezuela Los Teques Stake	20 Nov 2005	Venezuela Caracas
Caracas Venezuela Palo Verde Stake	14 June 1992	Venezuela Caracas
Caracas Venezuela Stake	15 May 1977	Venezuela Caracas
Caracas Venezuela Urdaneta Stake	7 May 1989	Venezuela Caracas
Carúpano Venezuela District		Venezuela Barcelona
Ciudad Bolívar Venezuela Stake	10 Nov 2002	Venezuela Barcelona
Ciudad Ojeda Venezuela Stake	24 Feb 1991	Venezuela Maracaibo
Coro Venezuela Stake	21 Oct 2018	Venezuela Valencia
Cumaná Venezuela Stake	15 May 2011	Venezuela Barcelona
El Rosario Venezuela District		Venezuela Maracaibo
El Tigre Venezuela Stake	29 June 2003	Venezuela Barcelona
Guacára Venezuela Stake	18 Nov 2007	Venezuela Valencia
Guarenas Venezuela Stake	11 Nov 2001	Venezuela Caracas
Guayana Venezuela Stake	15 Jan 1986	Venezuela Barcelona
La Fría Venezuela District	28 Sep 2014	Venezuela Maracaibo
La Pascua Venezuela District (Note: Only year for organized date is known. 1 July is used as placeholder for sorting.)	1 Jul 1986	Venezuela Caracas
Maracaibo Venezuela Centro Stake	17 May 1992	Venezuela Maracaibo
Maracaibo Venezuela South Stake	24 Apr 1983	Venezuela Maracaibo
Maracaibo Venezuela Stake	15 Sep 1980	Venezuela Maracaibo
Maracaibo Venezuela West Stake	7 May 2006	Venezuela Maracaibo
Maracay Venezuela Stake	4 Nov 1990	Venezuela Caracas
Maturín Venezuela Stake	20 Oct 2002	Venezuela Barcelona
Mérida Venezuela Stake	23 Mar 1997	Venezuela Maracaibo
Ocumare del Tuy Venezuela Stake	25 Jan 2004	Venezuela Caracas
Porlamar Venezuela District	3 Jun 2012	Venezuela Barcelona
Puerto La Cruz Venezuela Stake	7 June 1992	Venezuela Barcelona
Punto Fijo Venezuela Stake	8 Nov 2009	Venezuela Valencia
San Cristóbal Venezuela Pirineos Stake	19 Nov 1995	Venezuela Maracaibo
San Félix Venezuela Stake	25 Apr 2010	Venezuela Barcelona
San Francisco Venezuela Stake	12 Dec 2010	Venezuela Maracaibo
Valencia Venezuela Candelaria Stake	19 Nov 1995	Venezuela Valencia
Valencia Venezuela Los Sauces Stake	19 Aug 1979	Venezuela Valencia
Valera Venezuela District		Venezuela Maracaibo

== Missions ==
Mission	Organized
Venezuela Barcelona	1 Jul 1994
Venezuela Caracas	1 Jul 1971
Venezuela Maracaibo	1 Jul 1979
Venezuela Valencia	1 Jul 1991

Since 2014, all missionaries in Venezuela are local Venezuelans (no outside missionary support).

== Temples ==
96. Caracas Venezuela Temple; Official website; News & images	
Location: Announced: Groundbreaking: Dedicated: Size: Style:	Caracas, Venezuela; 30 September 1995 by Gordon B. Hinckley; 10 January 1999 by Francisco J. Viñas; 20 August 2000 by Gordon B. Hinckley; 15,332 sq ft (1,424.4 m^{2}) on a 0.5-acre (0.20 ha) site Classic modern, single-spire design - designed by Taller de Arquitectura and Church A&E Services
352. Maracaibo Venezuela Temple (Announced); Official website; News & images	
Location: Announced:	Maracaibo, Venezuela; 7 April 2024 by Russell M. Nelson

== See also ==
- Religion in Venezuela
