= The Church of Jesus Christ of Latter-day Saints in Bulgaria =

Latter Day Saints Church

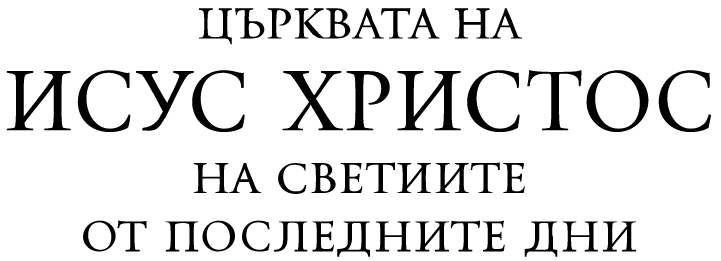
- (Logo in Bulgarian)

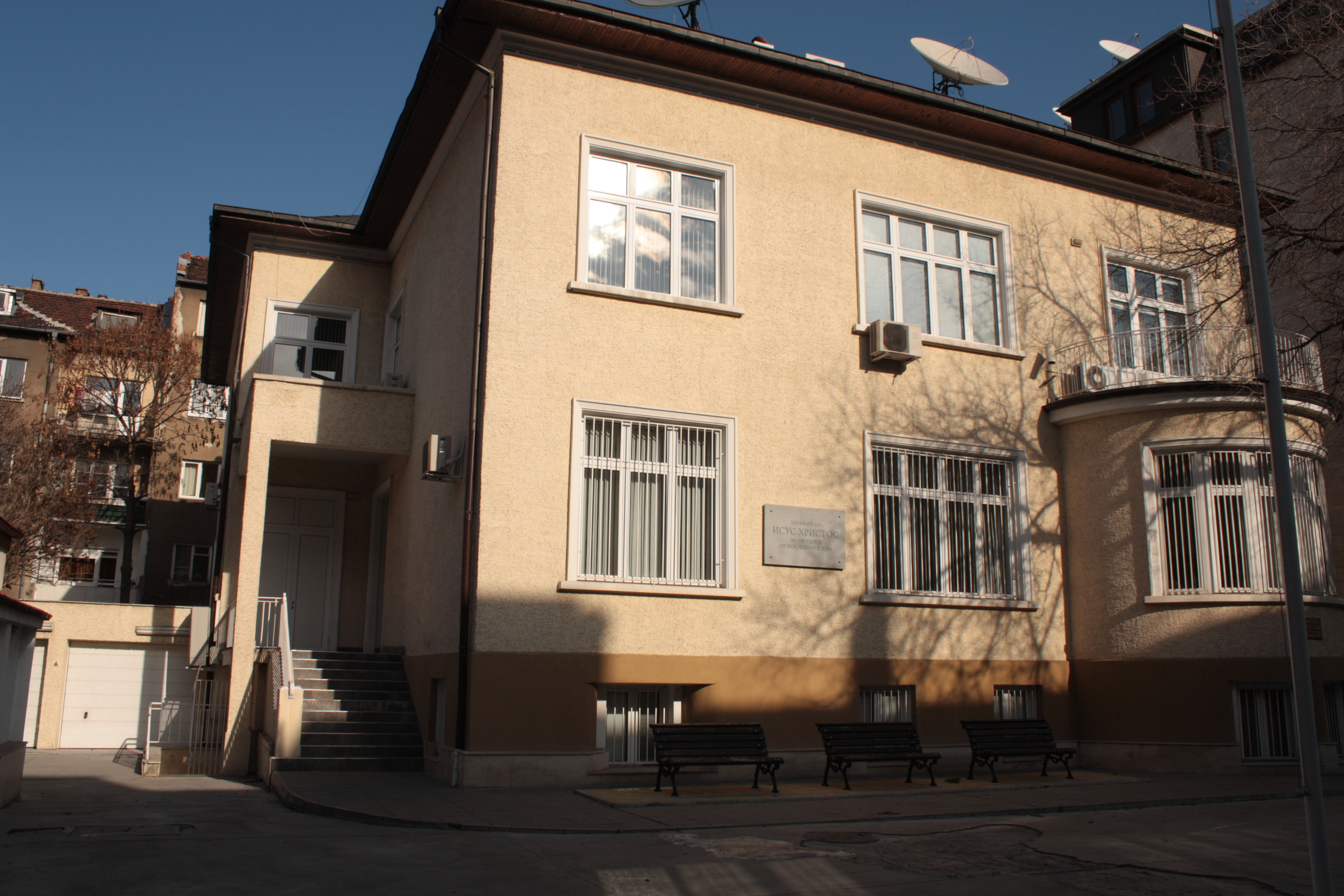
- The Mission home and office of the Bulgaria/Greece Mission, a family history center, and the meetinghouse for the Sofia Branch.
- Area: Europe Central
- Members: 2,424 (2025)
- Districts: 1
- Branches: 7
- Missions: 1
- FamilySearch Centers: 4

The Church of Jesus Christ of Latter-day Saints in Bulgaria refers to the Church of Jesus Christ of Latter-day Saints (LDS Church) and its members in Bulgaria. The first convert baptisms were performed in November 1990. In 2025, there were 2,424 members in 7 congregations.

== History ==
Membership in Bulgaria
Year	Membership
1991*	300
1999	1,367
2009	2,124
2019	2,440
2025	2,424
*Membership was published as a rounded number. Source: Wendall J. Ashton; Jim M. Wall, Deseret News, various years, Church Almanac Country Information: Bulgaria

Elder Russell M. Nelson and Elder Hans B. Ringger visited government officials in Sofia in October 1988 and again on February 13, 1990. During the second official Church visit to the country, Elder Nelson asked the government what the Church could do to help the people of Bulgaria. The government indicated that sending English teachers would be most beneficial. That same day in a snow-covered grove, Elder Nelson dedicated Bulgaria for missionary work and provided a blessing of hope for a better day where the nation would develop in peace. On September 12, 1990, six missionaries (2 senior couples and 2 other senior missionaries), under direction of the Austria Vienna East Mission, arrived in Bulgaria to teach English.

The first church service was held October 7, 1990 in one of the missionary couples apartment. Shortly after, the meeting place became a rented hall at Parchevich 49 in Sofia. On November 14, 1990, four proselytizing missionaries arrived and on November 24, the first six converts were baptized. These missionaries did not wear name tags, did not openly proselyte, and worked only through relatives and friends of those they met with. The first branches, Mladost and Sofia Central, were organized on July 1, 1991. The church gained official recognition from the government on July 10, 1991. The first post-communism Bulgarian converts to serve missions were D. Djambov and Lubomir Z. Traykov who began their mission in November 1992. Seminary and institute began in 1994. Excursions to the Freiberg Germany Temple began August 1995 and by October 1996, 138 Bulgarians had received temple ordinances.

Because baptisms were done by relatives of the church, the first four-generation Bulgarian Latter-day Saint member family was established by 1999, less than a decade after the first missionaries arrived in Bulgaria. The first youth conference was held in 1999 in which 106 youth attended. The first Church-built structure in Bulgaria, included a meetinghouse, mission offices, and mission home, was dedicated on June 18, 2000, in Sofia, by Charles Didier of the Seventy. 20 missionaries from Bulgaria were serving missions in 2000. Bulgaria became part of the Europe East Area on September 1, 2000. The mission president and his wife met with Bulgarian Councilor of Religious Affairs on January 30, 2007, to discuss the church in Bulgaria.

=== Humanitarian Efforts ===
In 1993, the Church sent many doctors and physicians such as pediatricians, ophthalmologists, audiologists went to Bulgaria to train doctors, nurses and other medical personnel to improve the health care of children. The Church also provided educational training to school administrators. Donations to schools for the mentally handicapped occurred the same year. Church members started a foundation named One Heart, which donated nutritious foods to Bulgarian orphanages in 2003. In 2007, the Church donated equipment to a hospital in Plovdiv used to diagnose brain and cranial conditions. The Church has conducted a total of 310 humanitarian and development projects in Bulgaria since 1985, including seventeen projects in 2017.

== Congregations ==
LDS Church Locations as of December 2025
The mission office and mission home is located in Sofia
Purple = meetinghouse
(FHC) = Family History Center located in or near the meetinghouse
White (FHC) = Family History Center located where there's not a meetinghouse

As of August 2026, Bulgaria had the following congregations:

- Blagoevgrad Branch
- Bourgas Branch
- Plovdiv Branch
- Ruse Branch
- Sofia Branch
- Stara Zagora Branch
- Varna Branch

Congregations not part of a stake are called branches, regardless of size.

== Mission ==
When first missionaries arrived on September 12, 1990, Bulgaria was under the direction of the Austria Vienna East Mission. On July 1, 1991, the Bulgaria Sofia Mission was created with Bulgarian native Kiril P. Kiriakov as president. Kiril Kiriakov, native to Bulgaria, sought political asylum from communist Bulgaria in France and the United States in the 1960s. On July 1, 2015, the Bulgaria Sofia Mission was split, and the Central Eurasian Mission was created from it and the Russia Novosibirsk Missions with its mission office located in Istanbul, Turkey. In April 2018, Bulgaria was added to the mission and it was renamed the Bulgarian Central Eurasian Mission. Its offices were moved to Sofia, Bulgaria. Boundaries for this mission include Azerbaijan, Bulgaria, Tajikistan, Turkey, Turkmenistan, and Uzbekistan.

On July 1, 2023 the mission was renamed and realigned to encompass Bulgaria, Greece and the island of Cyprus. The Greece Athens Mission was created July 1, 2026 encompassing Cypress and Greece. The Bulgaria Mission

=== Cyprus ===
The LDS Church reported 701 members in 5 congregations as well as 4 family search centers in Cyprus for year-end 2025. These congregations are part of the Nicosia Cyprus District which includes the Larnaca Branch, Limassol Branch, Nicosia Branch, Northern Cyprus Branch, and Paphos Branch. The Northern Cyprus Branch was created on July 24, 2022 being the first in the Turkish Republic of Northern Cyprus. Family history centers are located in Larnaca, Limassol, and Nicosia.

=== Greece ===
The LDS Church reported 818 members in 2 congregations in Greece for year-end 2025. These congregations consist of the Halandri Branch and the Thessaloniki Branch. The Greece Athens Mission was created July 1, 2026.

=== North Macedonia ===
The Skopje Branch is the only congregation of the LDS Church in North Macedonia. There were 41 members in this branch at year-end 2018.

== Temples ==
There are no temples in Bulgaria. The closest temples to Bulgaria are the Rome Italy Temple (assigned) and the Kyiv Ukraine Temple. On April 7, 2019 Church President Russell M. Nelson announced that a temple will be built in Hungary.

== See also ==
- Religion in Bulgaria
