= The Church of Jesus Christ of Latter-day Saints in Zimbabwe =

- Area: Africa South
- Members: 52,430 (2025)
- Stakes: 12
- Districts: 2
- Wards: 77
- Branches: 46
- Total Congregations: 123
- Missions: 2
- Temples: 1 operating
- FamilySearch Centers: 32

The Church of Jesus Christ of Latter-day Saints in Zimbabwe refers to the Church of Jesus Christ of Latter-day Saints (LDS Church) and its members in Zimbabwe. In 1975, there were 689 members in Zimbabwe. In 2025, there were 52,430 members in 123 congregations.

== History ==
Membership in Zimbabwe
Year	Membership
1975	689
1979	778
1989*	1,600
1999	8,287
2009	17,241
2019	34,330
2025	52,430
*Membership was published as a rounded number.

Limited missionary contact began in Zimbabwe (what was Southern Rhodesia) in the 1930s, but the first convert was not baptized until 1951. Missionary work was limited until after the church's 1978 Revelation on Priesthood which allowed blacks to hold the priesthood.

Gordon B. Hinckley visited Zimbabwe and spoke to members on February 18, 1998.

In April 2016 Thomas S. Monson announced the Church would build a temple in Zimbabwe.

More than 4,000 people turned out to hear Russell M. Nelson speak on April 17, 2018 during his visit to Zimbabwe.

== Stakes and districts ==
As of May 2026, the following stakes and districts were located within Zimbabwe

Stake/District	Organized	Mission
Bindura Zimbabwe Stake	28 Apr 2021	Zimbabwe Harare West
Bulawayo Zimbabwe Luveve Stake	1 Feb 2026	Zimbabwe Bulawayo
Bulawayo Zimbabwe Masiyephambili Stake	9 Jun 2024	Zimbabwe Bulawayo
Bulawayo Zimbabwe Stake	20 Mar 2005	Zimbabwe Bulawayo
Domboshawa Zimbabwe Stake	9 Nov 2025	Zimbabwe Harare West
Gweru Zimbabwe Stake	20 Mar 2011	Zimbabwe Bulawayo
Harare Zimbabwe Chitungwiza Stake	3 Nov 2024	Zimbabwe Harare East
Harare Zimbabwe East Stake	4 Dec 2016	Zimbabwe Harare East
Harare Zimbabwe Kuwadzana Stake	3 May 2026	Zimbabwe Harare West
Harare Zimbabwe Marimba Park Stake	8 Jun 2008	Zimbabwe Harare West
Harare Zimbabwe South Stake	15 Jun 2014	Zimbabwe Harare East
Harare Zimbabwe Stake	12 Dec 1999	Zimbabwe Harare West
Kadoma Zimbabwe District	10 Dec 2017	Zimbabwe Harare West
Masvingo Zimbabwe District	29 Sep 2024	Zimbabwe Bulawayo
Mkoba Zimbabwe Stake	22 Mar 2026	Zimbabwe Bulawayo
Mutare Zimbabwe Stake	22 Oct 2023	Zimbabwe Harare East
Nkulumane Zimbabwe Stake	2 Jun 2013	Zimbabwe Bulawayo

== Missions ==
Zimbabwe was part of the South Africa Johannesburg Mission until the Zimbabwe Harare Mission was created in July 1987. In 2018, the mission was split to create the Zimbabwe Bulawayo Mission.

Mission	Organized
Zimbabwe Harare East Mission	1 July 1987
Zimbabwe Harare West Mission	1 July 2026
Zimbabwe Bulawayo Mission	28 June 2018

== Temples ==
The Harare Zimbabwe Temple is currently the only temple in Zimbabwe.

214. Harare Zimbabwe Temple; Official website; News & images	
Location: Announced: Groundbreaking: Dedicated: Size:	Harare, Zimbabwe; 3 April 2016 by Thomas S. Monson; 12 December 2020 by Edward Dube; 1 March 2026 by Gerrit W. Gong; 17,250 sq ft (1,603 m^{2}) on a 6.7-acre (2.7 ha) site

== See also ==
- Edward Dube
- Religion in Zimbabwe
- Christianity in Zimbabwe

== Additional reading ==
- "Zimbabwe—Land of Beauty, People of Faith", Liahona, March 2014
