= The Church of Jesus Christ of Latter-day Saints in Cape Verde =

- (Logo in Portuguese)

- Area: Europe North
- Members: 18,030 (2025)
- Stakes: 4
- Districts: 1
- Wards: 28
- Branches: 18
- Total Congregations: 46
- Missions: 1
- Temples: 1 operating
- FamilySearch Centers: 9

The Church of Jesus Christ of Latter-day Saints in Cape Verde refers to the Church of Jesus Christ of Latter-day Saints (LDS Church) and its members in Cape Verde. At year-end 1989, there were 25 members in Cape Verde. In 2026, there were 18,030 members in 46 congregations. Cape Verde has more LDS Church members per capita than the United States as well more members per capita than any other country outside of Oceania and South America.

== History ==
Membership in Cape Verde
Year	Membership
1989	25
1993	*2,000
1999	3,893
2004	6,202
2009	6,905
2014	11,898
2019	15,780
2024	17,471
2025	18,030
*Membership was published as a rounded number.

Missionaries first came to Cape Verde in 1988 the first congregation was Praia/Lajes Branch.

In 1998, Gordon B. Hinckley visited the islands and met with members and government officials.

== Stakes and Districts ==
As of July 2026, the following stakes and districts exist in Cape Verde:

Stake	Organized	Mission
Assomada Cape Verde Stake	13 Jun 2021	Cape Verde Praia
Espargos Cape Verde District	9 Mar 2014	Cape Verde Mindelo
Mindelo Cape Verde Stake	6 Apr 1993	Cape Verde Mindelo
Praia Cape Verde Stake	18 Nov 1992	Cape Verde Praia
São Filipe Cape Verde Stake	24 Aug 1993	Cape Verde Praia

== Missions ==
The Cape Verde Praia Mission was organized on July 1, 2002. As of July 2025, this mission includes Cape Verde and Guinea-Bissau.

Mission	Organized
Cape Verde Praia Mission	1 Jul 2002
Cape Verde Mindelo Mission	1 Jul 2026

=== Guinea-Bissau ===
The Bissau Branch is the only LDS Church congregation in Guinea-Bissau and is part of the Espargos Cape Verde District which is directly administered by the Cape Verde Praia Mission.

== Temples ==
On October 7, 2018 the Praia Cape Verde Temple was announced by church president Russell M. Nelson. Ground was broken for construction on May 4, 2019.

173. Praia Cape Verde Temple; Official website; News & images	
Location: Announced: Groundbreaking: Dedicated: Size:	Praia, Cape Verde; 7 October 2018 by Russell M. Nelson; 4 May 2019 by Paul V. Johnson; 19 June 2022 by Neil L. Andersen; 8,759 sq ft (813.7 m^{2}) on a 4.46-acre (1.80 ha) site
