= The Church of Jesus Christ of Latter-day Saints in Belize =

- Area: Central America
- Members: 5,741 (2025)
- Districts: 2
- Branches: 12
- FamilySearch Centers: 4

The Church of Jesus Christ of Latter-day Saints in Belize refers to the Church of Jesus Christ of Latter-day Saints (LDS Church) and its members in Belize. The first branch was organized in Belize City in 1980. In 2025, there were 5,741 members in 12 congregations.

== History ==
Membership in Belize
Year	Membership
1983	452
1989*	1,300
1999	2,605
2009	3,609
2019	5,485
2025	5,741
*Membership was published as a rounded number. Source: Wendall J. Ashton; Jim M. Wall, Deseret News, various years, Church Almanac Country Information: Belize

President Samuel Flores, the president of the Honduras Tegucigalpa Mission and with another missionary, visited Belize on May 5, 1980 to begin formal missionary work. They were followed by 10 additional missionaries the next day. The first meeting was held on May 11. On June 1, Ernesto Alay was baptized, becoming the first convert in Belize. The Belize District was organized on April 17, 1983. Seminary and institute began in the early 1980s. Hilberto Cassanova became the first full-time missionary from Belize, serving from 1987 to 1989. In 1987, Meetinghouses were dedicated in Orange Walk and San Ignacio. On June 18, 1991 the Cayo Belize District was organized.

Then Elder Russell M. Nelson dedicated Belize for missionary work on December 7, 1992 at Burrell Boom with 36 members present. President Gordon B. Hinckley visited and spoke to a congregation of 1,200 at St. John´s College Gymnasium on November 13, 1997.

Silbert and Jennifer Gordon were the first Senior Couple to serve a full-time mission when they left on their mission on May 15, 2017. In March 2018, Elder Quentin L. Cook visited Belize.

=== Humanitarian Efforts ===
In 2002, the Church donated wheelchairs to Belize. Latter-day Saint Charities, the humanitarian arm of the church, has provided Hospitals and clinics, and disaster relief among other supplies and services. In 2021, Latter-day Saint Charities provided a $20 million donation to UNICEF to provide vaccines to Belize and other countries.

== Districts and Congregations ==
LDS Church Locations as of October 2025
Orange = District Center and Meetinghouse
Purple = meetinghouse
(FHC) = Family History Center

As of October 2025, Belize had the following districts and congregations:

Belize City District

- Belize City Branch
- Cinderella Branch (Spanish)
- Corozal Branch
- Orange Walk Branch
- San Pedro Branch

Cayo Belize District

- Belmopan Branch
- Bullet Tree Falls Branch
- Dangriga Branch
- Maya Mopan Branch
- San Ignacio Branch
- Santa Elena Branch
- Succotz Branch

Congregations in a district are called branches, regardless of size.

== Missions ==
Belize was part of the Honduras Tegucigalpa Mission when formal missionary work began. On 1 July 1990, the newly created Honduras San Pedro Sula Mission administered Belize. In 1993, Belize was briefly assigned to the Guatemala Guatemala City North Mission before being returned to the Honduras San Pedro Sula Mission. In 2008, Belize was assigned to the El Salvador San Salvador West Mission/Belize Mission and by 2025, was part of the Guatemala Cobán/Belize Mission.

== Temples ==
There are no temples in Belize. Belize is currently located within the Cobán Guatemala Temple District.

== See also ==
- Religion in Belize
