= The Church of Jesus Christ of Latter-day Saints in Malawi =

Latter Day Saints Church

- Area: Africa South
- Members: 7,857 (2025)
- Stakes: 2
- Districts: 1
- Wards: 10
- Branches: 11
- Total Congregations: 21
- FamilySearch Centers: 3

The Church of Jesus Christ of Latter-day Saints in Malawi refers to the Church of Jesus Christ of Latter-day Saints (LDS Church) and its members in Malawi. The first convert baptisms were performed in 1992. In 2025, there were 7,857 members in 21 congregations. Malawi was one of the fastest growing countries for LDS Church membership over the past decade.

== History ==
Membership in Malawi
Year	Membership
1999	181
2004	480
2009	798
2014	1,931
2019	3,143
2024	5,937
2025	7,857

In January 1991, there were a small group of American members working in Malawi when Elder Richard P. Lindsay of the Second Quorum of the Seventy and Africa Area President visited Malawi.

The first convert baptisms occurred when Brian and Betty Peedle, missionaries serving in Zimbabwe, drove to Sitima Village in July 1992. They taught and baptized 75 individuals, some waiting as long as 14 years to join the church. These were the first converts to be baptized in the country. Missionary couples traveled to Malawi from Zimbabwe for about a year until unrest from neighboring countries prevented missionaries from entering.

On April 25, 1995, the church received legal recognition in Malawi and it was assigned to the Zimbabwe Harare Mission. In 1999, Elder Dennis E. Simmons of the Seventy and President of the Africa Southeast Area and President Frank Bagley of the Zimbabwe Harare Mission visited the members in Sitima. On May 23, 1999, the Sitima Branch was organized with McFarlane N. Phiri as president. The first missionaries to live in Malawi was a missionary couple, Don and Berylene Frampton who arrived and lived in Blantyre in September 1999. Within a year, the Sitma Branch grew to 200 members. A second branch, located in Blantyre, was organized on July 30, 2000.

On July 3, 2005, the first meetinghouse built by the church, located in the Mandala Township in the city of Blantyre was dedicated by President Joseph Jenkins of the Zimbabwe Harare Mission. On October 25, 2011, Elder Russell M. Nelson of the Quorum of the Twelve, visited Malawi and dedicated the country for the preaching of the gospel.

=== Humanitarian efforts ===
In 2002, The LDS Church sent food boxes packed by volunteers, cereal, and grain to Malawi and neighboring countries to assist those hindered by the drought. The Church was undertook a campaign to vaccinate Malawians against measles in 2008. In 2016, Lilongwe Mayor, Willie Chapondera, commended missionaries for enhancing behavior change among individuals in the city. In 2018, the LDS Church stated it will continue taking part of national development through its self-reliance program. Between July 2019 and June 2020, partnering with Sightsavers, more than 130,000 people were screened for vision loss, and 924 received sight-restoring surgery. In 2020, the LDS Church donated $20 Million to UNICEF's global vaccination effort, benefitting those in Malawi and other countries. The LDS Church raised $200,000 worldwide in 2021 to construct school blocks at a primary school in Traditional Authority Chitukula in Lilongwe and provide desks and other furnishings.

== Stakes and congregations ==
LDS Church Locations as of November, 2024
Green = Stake
Orange = District
Purple = meetinghouse not part of a stake or district

As of May 2026, Malawi had the following stakes and congregations:

Blantyre Malawi Stake

- Bangwe Branch
- Blantyre 1st Ward
- Blantyre 2nd Ward
- Chilomoni Branch
- Chirimba Ward
- Liwonde Branch
- Ndirande 1st Ward
- Ndirande 2nd Branch
- Soche Branch
- Zingwangwa Ward
- Zomba Branch

Lilongwe Malawi Stake

- Chinsapo Branch
- Kalambo 1st Ward
- Kalambo 2nd Ward
- Kawale 1st Ward
- Kawale 2nd Branch
- Lilongwe Ward
- Presidential Way Ward

Kasungu Malawi District

- Chithiba Branch
- Four Ways Branch
- Kasungu 1st Branch
- Kasungu 2nd Branch
- Katema Branch
- Linyangwa Branch
- Maplot Branch
- Mwalawanyenje Branch

Mzuzu Meetinghouse

- Katoto Branch
- Mzuzu Branch

The Zambia Lusaka Dispersed Members Unit serves individuals and families not in proximity to a meetinghouse. Congregations not part of a stake are called branches, regardless of size.

== Missions ==
On April 25, 1995, the church received legal recognition in Malawi and it was assigned to the Zimbabwe Harare Mission. Malawi became part of the Zambia Lusaka Mission when it was created on July 1, 2011. The Malawi Lilongwe Mission was created on July 1, 2026 and boundaries encompasses the country.

== Temples ==
There are no temples in Malawi. Malawi is currently located within the Harare Zimbabwe Temple District.

== See also ==
- Religion in Malawi
