= The Church of Jesus Christ of Latter-day Saints in Finland =

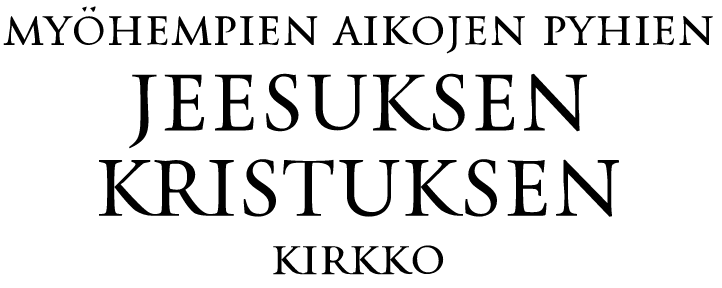
- (Logo in Finnish)

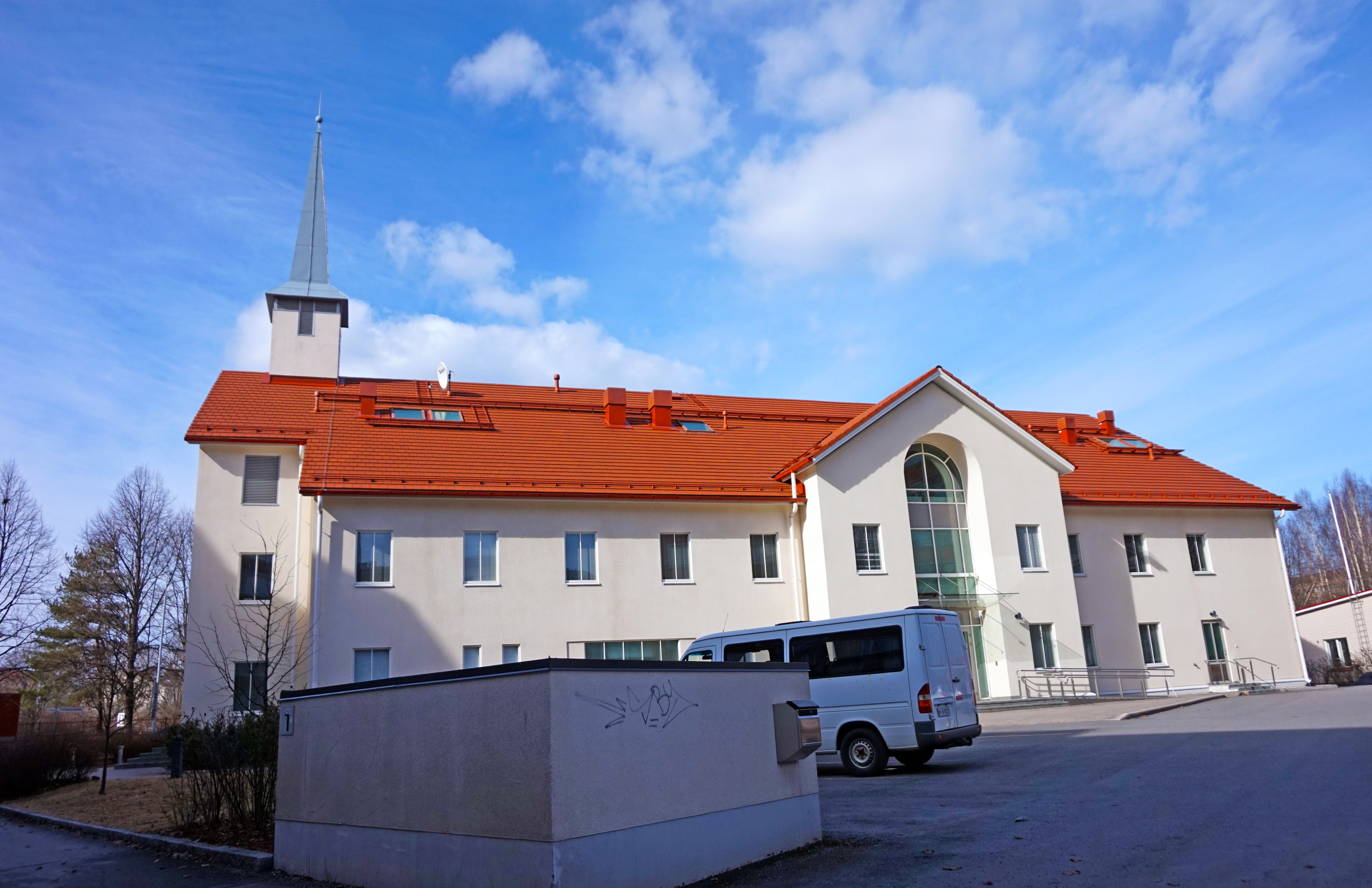
- A meetinghouse of The Church of Jesus Christ of Latter-day Saints in Tampere.
- Area: Europe North
- Members: 5,024 (2025)
- Stakes: 3
- Wards: 18
- Branches: 11
- Total congregations: 29
- Missions: 1
- Temples: 1 operating
- FamilySearch Centers: 29

The Church of Jesus Christ of Latter-day Saints in Finland refers to the Church of Jesus Christ of Latter-day Saints (LDS Church) and its members in Finland. In 1950, there were 204 members in Finland. In December of 2025, there were 5,024 members in 29 congregations.

== History ==
Membership In Finland
Year	Membership
1950	204
1960	1,297
1970	2,935
1980	4,214
1989*	4,200
1999	4,403
2009	4,548
2019	4,885
2025	5,024
1989 membership was published as a rounded number.

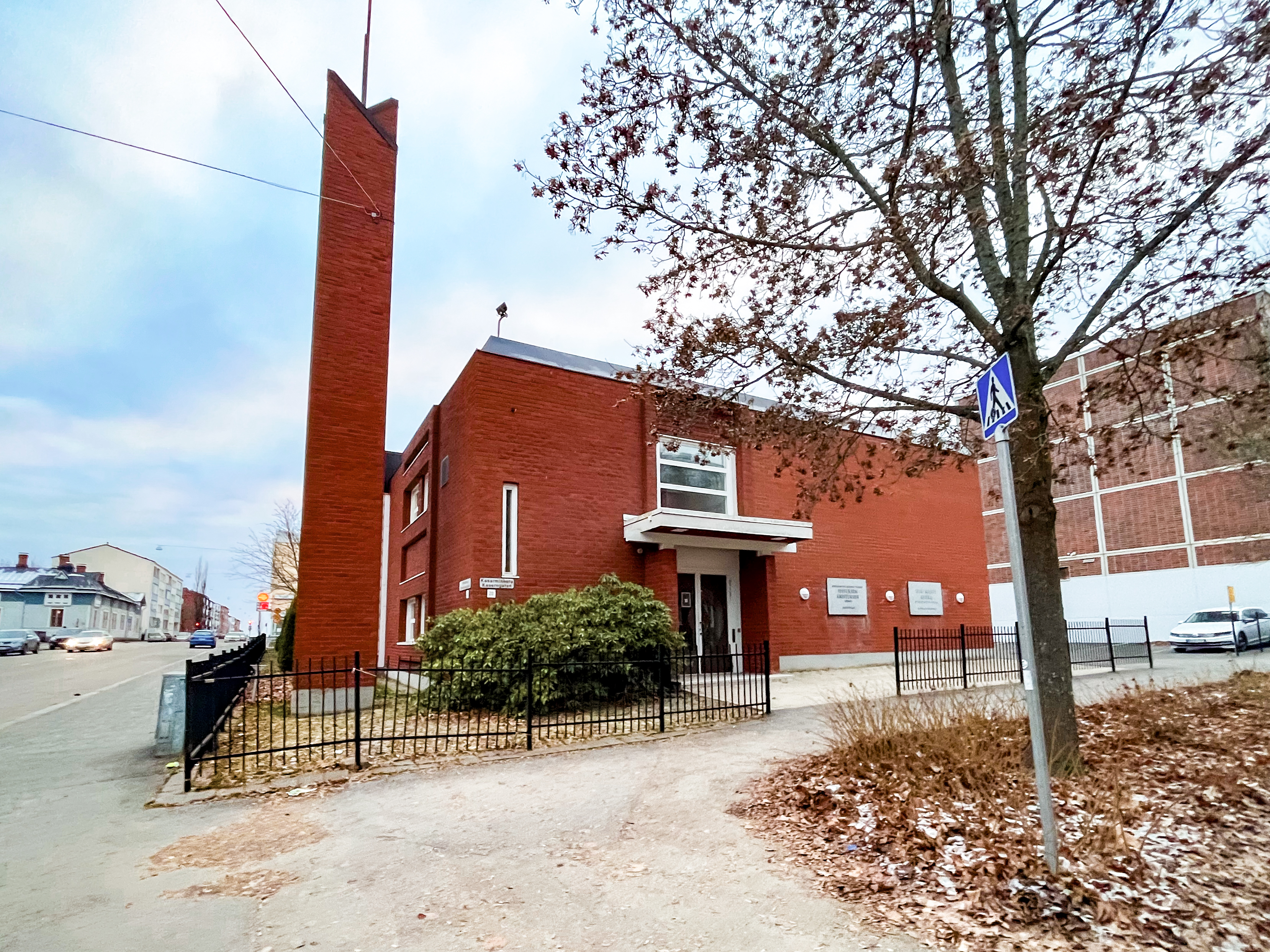
A Meetinghouse in Vaasa

Under the tsarist Russian State, the church was unrecognized and members and missionaries had several conflicts with police. Missionaries and converts often suffered covert surveillance, arrests, imprisonments, and deportations by police. The first convert from Finland was baptized in Sweden in 1869. Though not legally recognized at the time, the first missionaries were sent to Finland in late 1875. On May 6, 1876 the first convert, Johanna Berg, was baptized in Vaasa. The first branch was organized also in Vaasa on November 13, 1876. In 1917 Finland declared its independence from Russia.

On January 16, 1947 missionaries were assigned to learn the Finnish language. Later that year on September 1, the Finnish mission was organized with Hary A. Matis, an American with Finnish ancestry, as mission president. In 1948, the Church began microfilming church records and in 1954, the Book of Mormon was translated into Finnish.

On August 2–3, 1976, about 3,000 Latter-day Saints gathered in Helsinki to hear church President Spencer W. Kimball speak in Helsinki and on October 16, 1977 the Helsinki Finland Stake was organized with 3,642 members. 6 years later on April 17, 1983 the Tampere Finland Stake was organized.

Two former missionaries from the Finnish mission have served as US Ambassadors to Finland:

- Mark Evans Austad
- Keith Foote Nyborg

== Stakes and Congregations ==
Finland had 3 stakes as of August 2026.

Stake	Organized
Helsinki Finland Stake	October 16, 1977
Jyväskylä Finland Stake	May 16, 2021
Tampere Finland Stake	April 17, 1983

Helsinki Finland Stake

- Espoo 1st Ward
- Espoo 2nd Ward
- Helsinki 1st Ward
- Helsinki 2nd Ward
- Helsinki 3rd Ward (English)
- Hyvinkää Ward
- Kerava Ward
- Kymenlaakso Branch
- Lohja Branch

Jyväskylä Finland Stake

- Joensuu Branch
- Jyväskylä Ward
- Kajaani Branch
- Kemi Branch
- Kokkola Branch
- Kuopio Ward
- Lappeenranta Ward
- Mikkeli Branch
- Oulu Ward
- Pietarsaari Branch
- Rovaniemi Branch
- Vaasa Ward

Tampere Finland Stake

- Hämeenlinna Branch
- Lahti Ward
- Pori Branch
- Rauma Ward
- Tampere 1st Ward
- Tampere 2nd Ward
- Turku 1st Ward
- Turku 2nd Ward

== Mission ==
On January 16, 1947 missionaries were assigned to learn the Finnish language. Later that year on September 1, the Finnish mission was organized with Hary A. Matis, an American with Finnish ancestry, as mission president. On June 10, 1970 it was renamed the Finland Mission and on June 20, 1974 it was renamed the Finland Helsinki Mission to adjust to the naming convention of the church for missions. On July 1, 1990, The Finland Helsinki East Mission was organized to serve members and missionaries in the former Soviet Republics. On January 2, 1992 the mission was renamed Russia Moscow Mission.

== Temples ==
The Helsinki Finland Temple was dedicated on October 22, 2006 by Gordon B. Hinckley.

124. Helsinki Finland Temple; Official website; News & images	
Location: Announced: Groundbreaking: Dedicated: Size: Style:	Espoo, Finland; 2 April 2000 by Gordon B. Hinckley; 29 March 2003 by D. Lee Tobler; 22 October 2006 by Gordon B. Hinckley; 16,350 sq ft (1,519 m^{2}) on a 7.4-acre (3.0 ha) site Classic elegance, single-spire design - designed by Evata Architects

== See also ==
- Religion in Finland
