= The Church of Jesus Christ of Latter-day Saints in Botswana =

- Area: Africa South
- Members: 5,465 (2025)
- Stakes: 1
- Wards: 7
- Branches: 16
- Total congregations: 23
- FamilySearch Centers: 4

The Church of Jesus Christ of Latter-day Saints in Botswana refers to the Church of Jesus Christ of Latter-day Saints (LDS Church) and its members in Botswana. The country's first branch was organized in 1991 with fewer than 100 members. As of 2024, there were 5,465 members in 23 congregations in Botswana.

== History ==
Membership in Botswana
Year	Membership
1995*	300
1999*	700
2004	1,194
2009	1,305
2014	3,104
2019	3,653
2024	4,841
2025	5,465
*Membership was published as a rounded number.

The first branch of the LDS Church in Botswana was organized in 1983. LDS Church missionaries were not sent to Botswana until 1990 and the church did not receive official recognition until 1991. Among the early converts in Botswana was Kwasi Agyare Dwomoh, a Ghanaian architect employed by the government of Botswana. Dwomoh and his family joined the church in September 1990. He became the first branch president in August 1991, and the first district president in March 1992. He and his wife were the first couple to travel from Botswana to be sealed in a temple.

In 1995, all LDS Church units were included in the newly formed Roodeport South Africa Stake. The first Botswana native to serve a full-time mission for the LDS Church, Yakale Million Moroka, began serving in 1999 in the South Africa Cape Town Mission.

In the early 2000s, the church formed its first branch in Francistown in the north of Botswana. In 2009, missionaries were regularly sent there for the first time. In 2010, branches were formed in two additional cities. In 2012, a new stake was organized in Gaborone with Clement Mosiame Matswagothata as its president, and in 2013 Botswana was given its own mission.

== Stake and congregations ==
As of May 2026, the following were located in Botswana
Green = Stake
Orange = District
Purple = Meetinghouse not part of a stake or district

The Gaborone Botswana Stake was created on November 4, 2012. As of October 2026, Botswana had the following congregations:

Gaborone Botswana Stake

- Gaborone Broadhurst Ward
- Gaborone West Ward
- Gaborone West YSA Ward
- Mochudi 1st Ward
- Mochudi 2nd Branch
- Mogoditshane Ward
- Molepolole Ward
- Peolwane Branch
- Pilane Branch
- Village Ward

Kanye Botswana District

- Kanye Branch
- Kgwatlheng Branch
- Logaba Branch
- Peleng Branch
- Taukobong Branch
- Woodhall Branch

Francistown Botswana District

- Francistown Branch
- Gerald Branch
- Monarch Branch

Other Congregations The following congregations are located in Botswana but are not part of a stake or district:

- Botswana/Namibia Dispersed Members Unit
- Kasane Branch
- Maun Branch
- Serowe Branch

The Botswana/Namibia Dispersed Members Unit serves families and individuals in Botswana and Namibia that is not in proximity of a meetinghouse. Congregations not part of a stake are called branches, regardless of size.

== Missions ==
The Botswana Namibia Mission was created July 2013. In November 2022, the LDS Church announced creation of the South Africa Pretoria Mission in July 2023. The mission consists of the South Africa portion of the Botswana-Namibia Mission as well as a portion of the South Africa Durban Mission. In July 2023, the Botswana Namibia mission was realigned to only cover Botswana and Namibia.

=== Namibia ===
Membership in Namibia
Year	Membership
1989	99
1995*	200
1999	261
2004	402
2009	605
2014	793
2019	952
2024	1,297
2025	1,492
*Membership was published as a rounded number.

As of May 2025, the following were located in and near Namibia
Orange = District (multiple meetinghouses)
Purple = Other Meetinghouse

The LDS Church reported 1,492 members in 5 congregations as well as 2 family history centers in Namibia for year-end 2025. The Windhoek Namibia District was created on 8 March 2015. A family history center is located in Windhoek.

==== Congregations ====
As of May 2025, the following were located in Namibia:

Windhoek Namibia District

- Katutura Branch
- Swakopmund Branch
- Wanaheda Branch
- Windhoek Branch

Other Congregations

The following congregations are located in Botswana but are not part of a stake or district:

- Botswana/Namibia Dispersed Members Unit
- Ongwediva Branch

The Botswana/Namibia Dispersed Members Unit serves families and individuals in Botswana and Namibia that is not in proximity of a meetinghouse. Congregations not part of a stake are called branches, regardless of size.

== Temples ==
As of November 2025, Botswana and Namibia were located in the Johannesburg South Africa Temple district.

== See also ==
- Religion in Botswana
