= The Church of Jesus Christ of Latter-day Saints in Zambia =

- Area: Africa South
- Census: 5,267 (2022)
- Members: 7,823 (2025)
- Stakes: 1
- Districts: 2
- Wards: 6
- Branches: 14
- Total congregations: 20
- Missions: 1
- FamilySearch Centers: 5

The Church of Jesus Christ of Latter-day Saints in Zambia refers to the Church of Jesus Christ of Latter-day Saints (LDS Church) and its members in Zambia. At year-end 1992, there were about 100 members in Zambia. In the 2022 census, there were 5,267 members in 20 congregations.

== History ==
Membership in Zambia
Year	Membership
1992	100
1995*	400
1999	711
2004	1,442
2009	2,395
2014	3,359
2019	4,681
2024	7,072
2025	7,823
*Membership was published as a rounded number.

The Zimbabwe Harare Mission President, Vern Marble, went to Zambia to search for a couple who had been baptized in England, which they found with assistance from a taxi driver. In April 1992, Dean and Ruth Harrison were sent to Zambia as missionaries. In July, the Church again received legal recognition. The Lusaka Branch was organized on July 14, 1992, which had a membership around 50. On August 20, 1992, Elder Russell M. Nelson of the Quorum of the Twelve Apostles visited Zambia and dedicated the country for the preaching of the gospel. By year-end 1992, there were about 100 members in Zambia.

The Church seminary program was established in Zambia in 1995. By year-end 1997, membership had grown to over 500. A second Branch was organized in Lusaka, named the Libala Branch around 1997 to accommodate the increase in membership. The first Church building was dedicated in Lusaka in 1998.

Branches of the Church were organized in three major cities in the Zambian Copperbelt, in Luanshya on October 27, 2002, and then in Kitwe and N'Dola on December 1, 2002, which were organized into a district in 2005. The Lusaka Zambia District was organized, with 5 branches, on 16 February 2003 which became a stake on March 15, 2015.

In 2009, the Church's Perpetual Education Fund was brought to Zambia for the first time. The purpose of this funds is to assist youth in developing areas in effort to move them out of the cycle of poverty. Zambia became the 43rd country to offer the Perpetual Education Fund.

In 2016, Goma Radio Station, in Luanshya allocated 2 days per week where Church leaders and public affairs representatives spoke on two topics: Self reliance on Tuesdays and For the Strength of the Youth on Thursdays.

== Stake and Districts ==
Stake and Districts as of September 2026
Green = Stake
Orange = District
Purple = Meetinghouse not part of a stake or district

As of September 2026, the following stake and districts were located in Zambia:

Copperbelt Zambia Stake

- Bulangililo Branch
- Chifubu Branch
- Kawama 1st Branch
- Kawama 2nd Branch
- Kitwe Branch
- Luanshya Ward
- Masala Ward
- Ndeke Branch
- Ndola Ward
- Roan Branch
- Twapia Ward

Lusaka Zambia Stake

- Chainama Ward
- Kasupe Branch
- Libala Ward
- Lilanda Ward
- Lusaka Ward
- Matero Ward
- Munali Ward

Other Congregations

- Chibombo Branch
- Solwezi Branch
- Zambia Lusaka Dispersed Members Unit

The Zambia Lusaka Dispersed Members Unit serves individuals and members not in proximity to a meetinghouse, and is not part of a stake or district.

Congregations not within a stake are named branches, regardless of size.

== Mission ==
Zambia was administered by Zimbabwe Harare Mission when proselyting begun in 1991. The Zambia Lusaka Mission was organized on July 1, 2011. Up until 2026, the mission also included Malawi.

== Temples ==
Zambia is currently located in the Harare Zimbabwe Temple District. The Lubumbashi Democratic Republic of the Congo Temple is currently under construction.
