= The Church of Jesus Christ of Latter-day Saints in Benin =

- Area: Africa West
- Members: 8,286 (2026)
- Stakes: 2
- Wards: 22
- Branches: 12
- Total Congregations: 34
- Missions: 1
- FamilySearch Centers: 4

The Church of Jesus Christ of Latter-day Saints in Benin refers to the Church of Jesus Christ of Latter-day Saints (LDS Church) and its members in Benin. In January 2009, there were 253 members in Benin. In December 2025, there were 8,286 members in 34 congregations.

== History ==
Membership in Benin
Year	Membership
2005	<100
2009	253
2014	1,898
2019	4,018
2024	7,071
2025	8,286

In 1998, a small group of Beninese met in the home of Lincoln Dahl, a Latter-day Saint working in the American embassy in Cotonou. The first citizen of Benin to be Baptized was Claude P. Toze who was baptized on October 4, 1998. The first missionary couple assigned to live in Benin full time were Verne and Kathleen Davis, who arrived On January 23, 2001. The BYU Singers toured Benin in May 2001 and later donated their blue ties and dresses to be worn when legal recognition came. The Church obtained legal recognition in Benin on March 7, 2003. The first younger missionaries arrived the next month.

In 2005, the first branch was organized in Cotonou. By 2008, 3 branches had been organized. In 2012 a district was created in Cotonou, and on April 24, 2016, the Cotonou Stake was organized.

== Stakes and Congregations ==
As of March 2026, the following congregations were located in Benin:

Cotonou Benin Akpakpa Stake

- Akpakpa Ward
- Avotrou Ward
- Dowa Branch
- Finagnon Ward
- Gbegame Branch
- Jericho 1st Ward
- Jericho 2nd Ward
- Porto Novo Ward

Cococodji Benin Stake

- Agla Ward
- Aibatin Ward
- Allada Ward
- Cococodji Ward
- Cocotomey Ward
- Fidjrosse Ward
- Fiyegnon Ward
- Hevie Ward
- Hilacondji Branch
- Houinme Ward
- Pahou Ward

Cotonou Benin Stake

- Arconville Ward
- Atrokpocodji Ward
- Calavi Ward
- Gbedjromede Ward
- Glo Branch
- Menontin Ward
- Sainte Rita Ward
- Zogbo Branch

Bohicon Benin District

- Bohicon Branch
- Dassa-Zoume Branch
- Lokossa Branch
- Parakou Branch
- Seme Branch
- Tchaourou Branch

Other Congregations

- Benin Cotonou Dispersed Members Unit

The Benin Cotonou Dispersed Members Unit serves individuals and families not in proximity to a meetinghouse. All congregations not part of a stake are classified as branches, regardless of size.

== Missions ==
Benin was assigned to the Ivory Coast Mission in 1999. Shortly after, the Ivory Coast Mission was renamed the Ivory Coast Abidjan Mission to meet the church's mission naming guidelines.

The Ghana Cape Coast Mission was organized on 1 July 2005 which Benin was a part of. On July 1, 2011, the Benin Cotonou Mission was created covering Benin and Togo. On July 1, 2026, the Togo Lomé Mission was created with the Benin Cotonou Mission only encompassing Benin.

== Temples ==
As of July 2026, Benin is part of the Accra Ghana Temple District.

117. Accra Ghana Temple; Official website; News & images	
Location: Announced: Groundbreaking: Dedicated: Size: Style:	Accra, Ghana; 16 February 1998 by Gordon B. Hinckley; 16 November 2001 by Russell M. Nelson; 11 January 2004 by Gordon B. Hinckley; 17,500 sq ft (1,630 m^{2}) on a 6-acre (2.4 ha) site Classic modern, single-spire design - designed by ARUP

== See also ==
- Religion in Benin
