= The Church of Jesus Christ of Latter-day Saints in Togo =

- Area: Africa West
- Members: 8,349 (2025)
- Stakes: 3
- Wards: 19
- Branches: 12
- Total Congregations: 31
- FamilySearch Centers: 4

The Church of Jesus Christ of Latter-day Saints in Togo refers to the Church of Jesus Christ of Latter-day Saints (LDS Church) and its members in Togo. A small group was formed in 1997 which developed into a branch in 1999. In 2025, there were 8,349 members in 31 congregations.

== History ==
Membership in Togo
Year	Membership
1997	70
1999	122
2004	504
2009	1,034
2014	2,801
2019	5,320
2024	7,684
2025	8,349
*Membership was published as a rounded number.

Dieudonné Attiogbe became a member of the LDS Church in 1989, while he and his father lived in England. After returning home, he found the LDS Church was not in Togo. He sent letters to church headquarters in South Africa who then sent a letter to Salt Lake City asking if a group could be organized. Dieudonné Attiogbe was given tentative permission to organize a group and was given a list of 70 individuals that were baptized abroad and had returned to Togo. On July 15, 1997, James O. Mason, who was serving as president of the church's Africa Area organized the Lome Togo group, with Agnon Ameri Didier as presiding elder.

On February 19, 1999, Togo came under the stewardship of the church's Ivory Coast Abidjan Mission, and the first missionary couple, Demoine A. and Joyce Findlay, began missionary work in Togo. Three days later on February 21, 1999, the Lomé Branch, the first in Togo, was organized with Dieudonné Attiogbe as branch president. Seminary and institute commenced that same year. Legal recognition for the LDS Church was granted in July 2000. Lomé Branch's first conference was held December 17, 2000. In 2009, the church's first district was organized in Lomé. On December 8, 2013, the Lomé Togo Stake, the first in Togo, was organized. A second stake was organized in Lomé in 2017.

The LDS Church conducted several humanitarian and development projects in Togo between 1985 and 2019 which included community projects, vaccination initiates, newborn and prenatal care, and wheelchair donations.

== Stakes ==
As of July 2026, Togo had the following stakes and congregations:

Lomé Togo Agoe Stake (created 7 May 2023)

- Adetikope Branch
- Adidogome Ward
- Agoe Nyive Ward
- Agoe Plateau Branch
- Apedokoe Ward
- Djagble Ward
- Djidlolé Branch
- Kélegougan Ward
- Legbassito Branch
- Sagbado Branch
- Sanguéra Ward

Lomé Togo Be Stake (created 8 Dec 2013)

- Adakpame Ward
- Anfame Ward
- Attiegou Ward
- Baguida Ward
- Be-Kpota 1st Ward
- Be-Kpota 2nd Ward
- Hédzranawoé 1st Ward
- Hédzranawoé 2nd Branch
- Kpogan Branch

Lomé Togo Tokoin Stake (created 22 Oct 2017)

- Ablogame Ward
- Akodessewa Ward
- Doumassesse Ward
- Kodjoviakope Branch
- Souzanetime Ward
- Tokoin Ward
- Wuiti Ward

Tsévié Togo District (created 14 Jun 2026)

- Davie Branch
- Kpalime Branch
- Notse Branch
- Tabligbo Branch
- Tsévié Branch
- Zomayi Branch

Congregations directly administered by the Benin Cotonou Mission include:

- Benin Cotonou Dispersed Members Unit

The Benin Cotonou Dispersed Members Unit serves church members not in proximity to a meetinghouse, and is not part of a stake or district. Congregations not within a stake are named branches, regardless of size.

== Missions ==
Togo was assigned to the Ivory Coast Mission in 1999. Shortly after, the Ivory Coast Mission was renamed the Ivory Coast Abidjan Mission to meet the church's mission naming guidelines. The Ghana Cape Coast Mission was organized on 1 July 2005, of which Benin was a part. On July 1, 2011, the Benin Cotonou Mission was created. The mission covers the countries of Benin and Togo. The Togo Lomé Mission was created in July 2026 and with the mission encompassing the national boundaries.

== Temples ==
There are no temples in Togo. Togo is currently located in the Accra Ghana Temple district.

== See also ==
- Religion in Togo
