= The Church of Jesus Christ of Latter-day Saints in Burundi =

- Area: Africa Central
- Members: 2,070 (2025)
- Districts: 1
- Branches: 12
- FamilySearch Centers: 1

The Church of Jesus Christ of Latter-day Saints in Burundi refers to the Church of Jesus Christ of Latter-day Saints (LDS Church) and its members in Burundi. As of year-end 2024, the Church reports 2,070 members in 12 congregations in Burundi.

== History ==
Membership in Burundi
| Year | Membership |
|---|---|
| 2009 | 8 |
| 2014 | 526 |
| 2019 | 749 |
| 2024 | 1,807 |
| 2025 | 2,070 |

The first Burundian church members joined in Europe in the 1980s; several of these members returned to Burundi and began establishing the Church's presence there. In 1993, the country became part of the Ivory Coast Abidjan Mission; missionaries were soon removed from the country due to mounting political violence. In 2000, the Bujumbura Branch was discontinued.

In 2009, Church leadership in Africa made several exploratory trips to Burundi to assess conditions and locate members. They found 12 unofficial LDS congregations that were still holding regular worship services. In 2010, six proselyting missionaries and two senior missionaries were sent from the Church's DR Congo Lubumbashi Mission. That same year, Elder Jeffrey R. Holland dedicated Burundi for missionary work. The Bujumbura Branch was subsequently reestablished in 2011. More branches followed, and the Bujumbura Burundi District was organized in 2021.

== District and branches ==
As of August 2026, the following were located in Burundi
Orange = District
Purple = Meetinghouse not part of a stake or district

As of August 2026, the Church has one district and eight branches in Burundi:

Bujumbura Burundi District

- Bujumbura 1st Branch
- Bujumbura 2nd Branch
- Bujumbura 3rd Branch
- Gihosha Branch
- Kanyosha Branch
- Rubirizi Branch

Other branches

- Cibitoke Branch
- Gitega Branch
- Kavumu Branch
- Muzinda Branch
- Ngozi Branch
- Rumonge Branch

The Rwanda Kigali Dispersed Members Unit serves individuals and families not in proximity of a meetinghouse.

The Church also operates a FamilySearch Center in Bujumbura.

== Mission ==
In the 1990s, Burundi was assigned to the Ivory Coast Abidjan Mission. In 2009, it was assigned to the Uganda Kampala Mission, and in 2010 it was assigned to the DR Congo Lubumbashi Mission. In 2022, the Church created the Rwanda Kigali Mission, and as of February 2025, this mission covers Rwanda, Burundi, and the Kivu region of DR Congo.

== Temple ==
As of May 2025, Burundi is assigned to the Nairobi Kenya Temple district.

== See also ==
- Religion in Burundi
