= Membership history of the Church of Jesus Christ of Latter-day Saints =

Membership history of the church

The self-reported membership of the Church of Jesus Christ of Latter-day Saints (LDS Church) as of December 31, 2023, was 17,255,394.

== Membership defined ==
The LDS Church defines membership as:

1. Those who have been baptized and confirmed.
2. Those under age nine who have been blessed but not baptized.
3. Those who are born to members but are not accountable because of intellectual disabilities, regardless of age.
4. Unblessed children under age eight when:
  1. Two member parents request it; or
  2. One member parent requests it and the nonmember parent gives permission.

== Growth and demographic history ==
The records of the LDS Church show membership growth every decade since its beginning in the 1830s, although that has slowed significantly. Following initial growth rates that averaged 10% to 25% per year in the 1830s through 1850s, it grew at about 4% per year through the last four decades of the 19th century. After a steady slowing of growth in the first four decades of the 20th century to a rate of about 2% per year in the 1930s (the Great Depression years), growth boomed to an average of 6% per year for the decade around 1960, staying around 4% to 5% through 1990. After 1990, average annual growth again slowed steadily to a rate around 2.2% for the ten years ending 2015, approximately double the average world population growth rate of 1.1% for the same period. The growth rate has not been greater than 3% per year in the 21st century and has decelerated steadily since 2012. The rate has not been above 2% since 2013. These records are reported as exact numbers by church leaders based on church-maintained membership records for every person who meets the church's membership criteria.

In May 2019, Phil Zuckerman Ph.D. of Psychology Today cited analysis conducted by journalist Jana Riess confirming that US retention, religious participation, and belief have been decelerating since 2007. Riess made a US study in her book The Next Mormons. Book reviewer Stephen Cranney stated in his review of The Next Mormons that the book "fill[s] the need for a large, representative Latter-day Saint sample." Cranney also stated that "Media outlets and others will occasionally perform one-off surveys that gather Latter-day Saint responses to specific (often political) issues, but generally social scientists, the media, and the public are flying in the dark when it comes to finding representative numbers about Latter-day Saint attitudes and beliefs. The few surveys that do have large numbers of Latter-day Saints (such as the American Religious Identification Survey or the Pew Religious Landscape Surveys) are generic religion surveys, so questions do not reflect concerns, language, or concepts specific to Latter-day Saints."

== LDS Church membership numbers ==
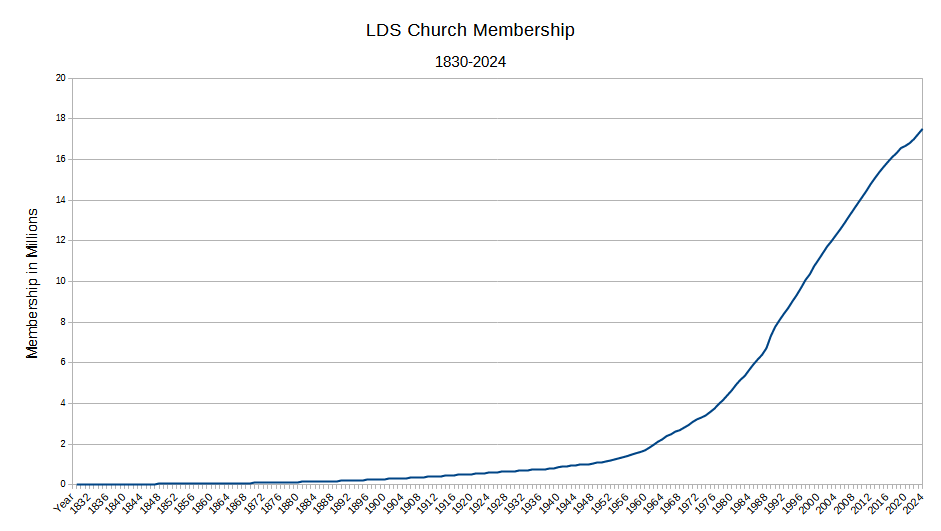
LDS Church membership from 1830-2024

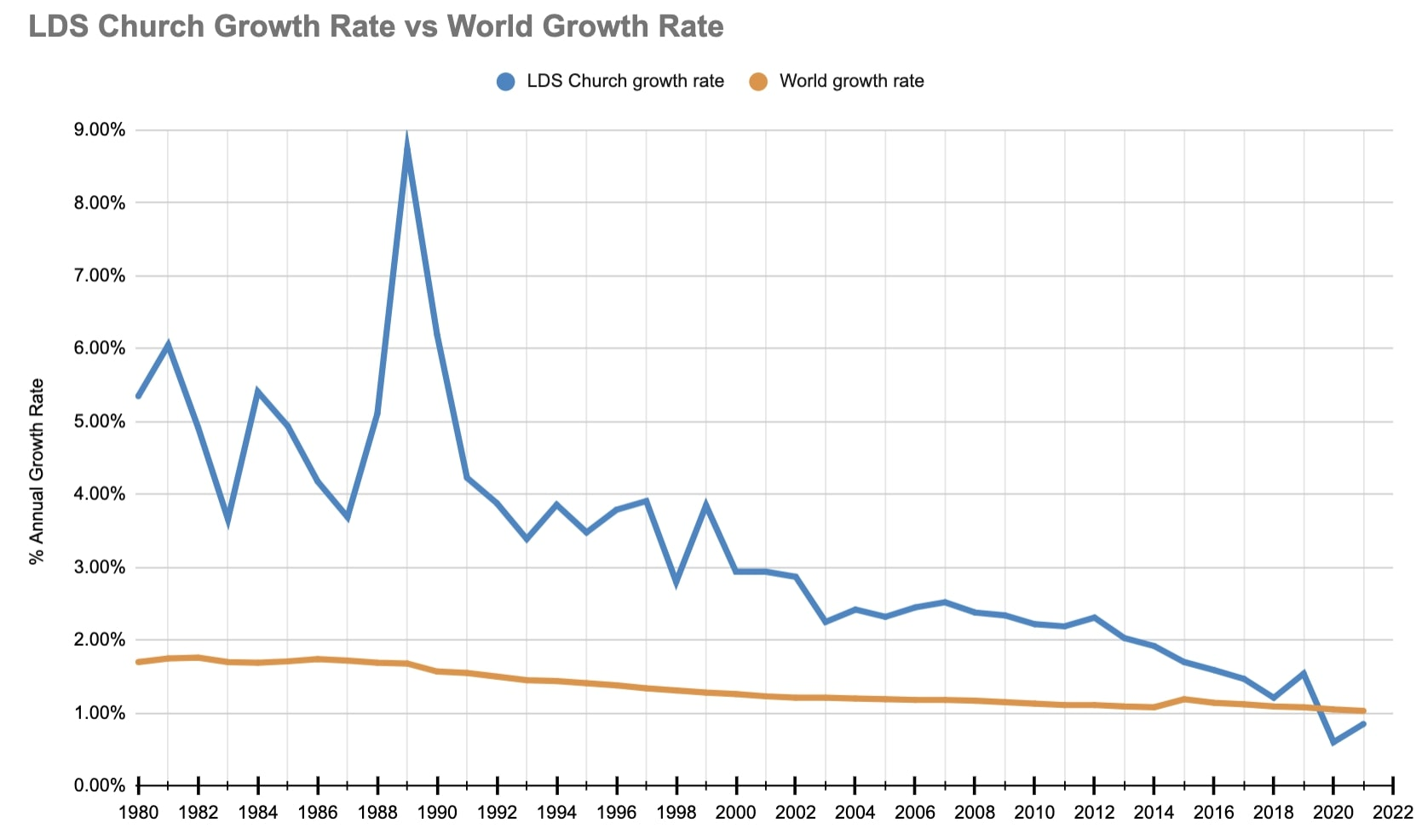
LDS Church growth rate vs. world growth rate from 1980-2021

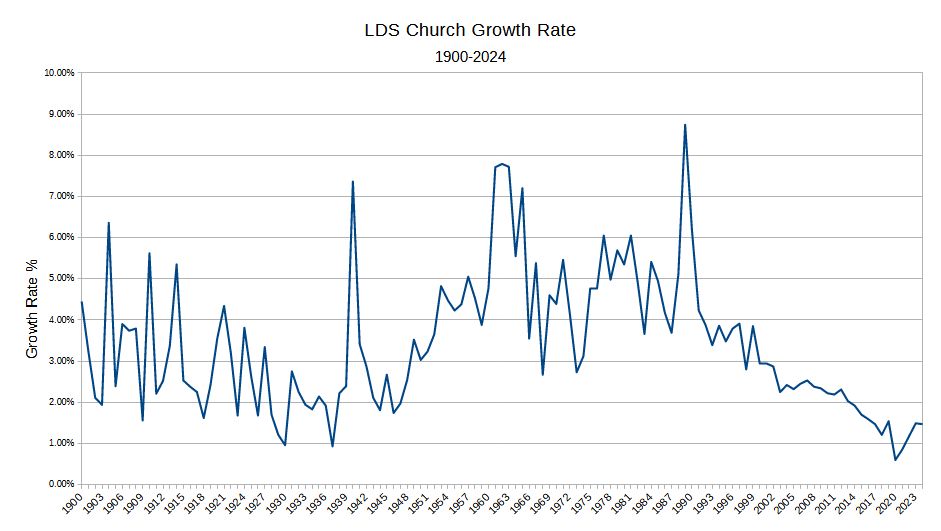
LDS Church growth rate from 1900-2024

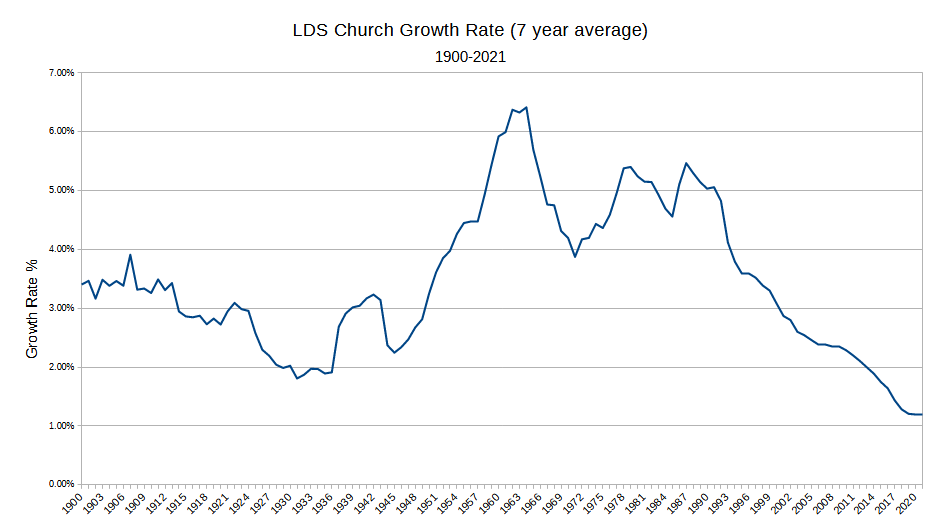
LDS Church 7 year average growth rate from 1900-2021

== Table for recent growth ==
World population numbers as of April 7, 2024.

Year	LDS Church growth rate	World growth rate	Growth rate difference
1980	5.35%	1.70%	3.65%
1981	6.05%	1.75%	4.30%
1982	4.92%	1.76%	3.16%
1983	3.66%	1.70%	1.96%
1984	5.41%	1.69%	3.72%
1985	4.94%	1.71%	3.23%
1986	4.18%	1.74%	2.44%
1987	3.69%	1.72%	1.97%
1988	5.11%	1.69%	3.42%
1989	8.74%	1.68%	7.06%
1990	6.19%	1.57%	4.62%
1991	4.23%	1.55%	2.68%
1992	3.88%	1.50%	2.38%
1993	3.39%	1.45%	1.94%
1994	3.86%	1.44%	2.42%
1995	3.48%	1.41%	2.07%
1996	3.79%	1.38%	2.41%
1997	3.91%	1.34%	2.57%
1998	2.80%	1.31%	1.49%
1999	3.85%	1.28%	2.57%
2000	2.94%	1.26%	1.68%
2001	2.94%	1.23%	1.71%
2002	2.87%	1.21%	1.66%
2003	2.25%	1.21%	1.04%
2004	2.42%	1.20%	1.22%
2005	2.32%	1.19%	1.13%
2006	2.45%	1.18%	1.27%
2007	2.52%	1.18%	1.34%
2008	2.38%	1.17%	1.21%
2009	2.34%	1.15%	1.19%
2010	2.22%	1.13%	1.09%
2011	2.19%	1.11%	1.08%
2012	2.31%	1.11%	1.20%
2013	2.03%	1.09%	0.94%
2014	1.92%	1.08%	0.84%
2015	1.70%	1.19%	0.51%
2016	1.59%	1.14%	0.45%
2017	1.47%	1.12%	0.35%
2018	1.21%	1.09%	0.12%
2019	1.54%	1.08%	0.46%
2020	0.60%	0.98%	-0.38%
2021	0.85%	0.87%	-0.02%
2022	1.17%	0.83%	0.34%
2023	1.49%	0.88%	0.61%

== Table for LDS Church membership numbers ==
Membership numbers from 1830-2011 come from the 2013 Church Almanac.

Year	Membership	Number change	Percentage growth	Average % growth (starting 1860 on)	7-Year Average (3 years either side)
1830 Apr 6	6	6	0	N/A	N/A
1830 Dec 31	280	274	4566.67%	N/A	N/A
1831	680	400	142.86%	N/A	N/A
1832	2,661	1,981	291.32%	N/A	N/A
1833	3,140	479	18.00%	N/A	N/A
1834	4,372	1,232	39.24%	N/A	N/A
1835	8,835	4,463	102.08%	N/A	N/A
1836	13,293	4,458	50.46%	N/A	N/A
1837	16,282	2,989	22.49%	N/A	N/A
1838	17,881	1,599	9.82%	N/A	N/A
1839	16,460	-1,421	-7.95%	N/A	N/A
1840	16,865	405	2.46%	N/A	N/A
1841	19,856	2,991	17.73%	N/A	N/A
1842	23,564	3,708	18.67%	N/A	N/A
1843	25,980	2,416	10.25%	N/A	N/A
1844	26,146	166	0.64%	N/A	N/A
1845	30,332	4,186	16.01%	N/A	N/A
1846	33,993	3,661	12.07%	N/A	N/A
1847	34,694	701	2.06%	N/A	N/A
1848	40,477	5,783	16.67%	N/A	N/A
1849	48,160	7,683	18.98%	N/A	N/A
1850	51,839	3,679	7.64%	N/A	N/A
1851	52,165	326	0.63%	N/A	N/A
1852	52,640	475	0.91%	N/A	N/A
1853	64,154	11,514	21.87%	N/A	N/A
1854	68,429	4,275	6.66%	N/A	N/A
1855	63,974	-4,455	-6.51%	N/A	N/A
1856	63,881	-93	-0.15%	N/A	N/A
1857	55,236	-8,645	-13.53%	N/A	N/A
1858	55,755	519	0.94%	N/A	N/A
1859	57,038	1,283	2.30%	N/A	N/A
1860	61,082	4,044	7.09%	7.09%	1.92%
1861	66,211	5,129	8.40%	7.75%	4.36%
1862	68,780	2,569	3.88%	6.46%	4.70%
1863	71,770	2,990	4.35%	5.93%	4.57%
1864	74,348	2,578	3.59%	5.46%	4.16%
1865	76,771	2,423	3.26%	5.10%	3.57%
1866	77,884	1,113	1.45%	4.57%	3.66%
1867	81,124	3,240	4.16%	4.52%	3.31%
1868	84,622	3,498	4.31%	4.50%	3.67%
1869	88,432	3,810	4.50%	4.50%	3.58%
1870	90,130	1,698	1.92%	4.26%	3.87%
1871	95,596	5,466	6.06%	4.41%	3.61%
1872	98,152	2,556	2.67%	4.28%	3.44%
1873	101,538	3,386	3.45%	4.22%	3.32%
1874	103,916	2,378	2.34%	4.10%	3.56%
1875	107,167	3,251	3.13%	4.04%	3.93%
1876	111,111	3,944	3.68%	4.01%	3.93%
1877	115,065	3,954	3.56%	3.99%	4.02%
1878	125,046	9,981	8.67%	4.24%	4.44%
1879	128,386	3,340	2.67%	4.16%	4.49%
1880	133,628	5,242	4.08%	4.15%	4.55%
1881	140,733	7,105	5.32%	4.21%	4.67%
1882	145,604	4,871	3.46%	4.17%	3.96%
1883	151,593	5,989	4.11%	4.17%	3.80%
1884	158,242	6,649	4.39%	4.18%	3.77%
1885	164,130	5,888	3.72%	4.16%	3.61%
1886	166,653	2,523	1.54%	4.07%	3.34%
1887	173,029	6,376	3.83%	4.06%	3.15%
1888	180,294	7,265	4.20%	4.06%	3.07%
1889	183,144	2,850	1.58%	3.98%	2.94%
1890	188,263	5,119	2.80%	3.94%	3.68%
1891	195,445	7,182	3.81%	3.94%	3.66%
1892	200,961	5,516	2.82%	3.90%	3.62%
1893	214,534	13,573	6.75%	3.99%	4.03%
1894	222,369	7,835	3.65%	3.98%	4.48%
1895	231,116	8,747	3.93%	3.98%	4.58%
1896	241,427	10,311	4.46%	3.99%	4.41%
1897	255,736	14,309	5.93%	4.04%	4.08%
1898	267,251	11,515	4.50%	4.05%	4.02%
1899	271,681	4,430	1.66%	3.99%	3.76%
1900	283,765	12,084	4.45%	4.00%	3.40%
1901	292,931	9,166	3.23%	3.98%	3.46%
1902	299,105	6,174	2.11%	3.94%	3.16%
1903	304,901	5,796	1.94%	3.90%	3.48%
1904	324,289	19,388	6.36%	3.95%	3.38%
1905	332,048	7,759	2.39%	3.92%	3.46%
1906	345,014	12,966	3.90%	3.92%	3.38%
1907	357,913	12,899	3.74%	3.91%	3.91%
1908	371,472	13,559	3.79%	3.91%	3.32%
1909	377,279	5,807	1.56%	3.86%	3.33%
1910	398,478	21,199	5.62%	3.90%	3.26%
1911	407,291	8,813	2.21%	3.87%	3.49%
1912	417,555	10,264	2.52%	3.84%	3.31%
1913	431,607	14,052	3.37%	3.83%	3.43%
1914	454,718	23,111	5.35%	3.86%	2.94%
1915	466,238	11,520	2.53%	3.83%	2.86%
1916	477,321	11,083	2.38%	3.81%	2.85%
1917	488,038	10,717	2.25%	3.78%	2.87%
1918	495,962	7,924	1.62%	3.75%	2.73%
1919	507,961	11,999	2.42%	3.72%	2.82%
1920	525,987	18,026	3.55%	3.72%	2.72%
1921	548,803	22,816	4.34%	3.73%	2.95%
1922	566,358	17,555	3.20%	3.72%	3.09%
1923	575,896	9,538	1.68%	3.69%	2.98%
1924	597,861	21,965	3.81%	3.69%	2.95%
1925	613,572	15,711	2.63%	3.68%	2.58%
1926	623,909	10,337	1.68%	3.65%	2.29%
1927	644,745	20,836	3.34%	3.64%	2.19%
1928	655,686	10,941	1.70%	3.61%	2.04%
1929	663,652	7,966	1.21%	3.58%	1.98%
1930	670,017	6,365	0.96%	3.54%	2.02%
1931	688,435	18,418	2.75%	3.53%	1.81%
1932	703,949	15,514	2.25%	3.51%	1.87%
1933	717,619	13,670	1.94%	3.49%	1.97%
1934	730,738	13,119	1.83%	3.47%	1.97%
1935	746,384	15,646	2.14%	3.45%	1.89%
1936	760,690	14,306	1.92%	3.43%	1.91%
1937	767,752	7,062	0.93%	3.40%	2.68%
1938	784,764	17,012	2.22%	3.39%	2.91%
1939	803,528	18,764	2.39%	3.37%	3.01%
1940	862,664	59,136	7.36%	3.42%	3.04%
1941	892,080	29,416	3.41%	3.42%	3.17%
1942	917,715	25,635	2.87%	3.42%	3.23%
1943	937,050	19,335	2.11%	3.40%	3.14%
1944	954,004	16,954	1.81%	3.38%	2.37%
1945	979,454	25,450	2.67%	3.37%	2.24%
1946	996,505	17,051	1.74%	3.35%	2.34%
1947	1,016,170	19,665	1.97%	3.34%	2.47%
1948	1,041,970	25,800	2.54%	3.33%	2.67%
1949	1,078,671	36,701	3.52%	3.33%	2.81%
1950	1,111,314	32,643	3.03%	3.33%	3.25%
1951	1,147,157	35,843	3.23%	3.33%	3.61%
1952	1,189,053	41,896	3.65%	3.33%	3.85%
1953	1,246,362	57,309	4.82%	3.35%	3.97%
1954	1,302,240	55,878	4.48%	3.36%	4.26%
1955	1,357,274	55,034	4.23%	3.37%	4.45%
1956	1,416,731	59,457	4.38%	3.38%	4.48%
1957	1,488,314	71,583	5.05%	3.40%	4.47%
1958	1,555,799	67,485	4.53%	3.41%	4.94%
1959	1,616,088	60,289	3.88%	3.41%	5.44%
1960	1,693,180	77,092	4.77%	3.43%	5.92%
1961	1,823,661	130,481	7.71%	3.47%	5.99%
1962	1,965,786	142,125	7.79%	3.51%	6.37%
1963	2,117,451	151,665	7.72%	3.55%	6.33%
1964	2,234,916	117,465	5.55%	3.57%	6.41%
1965	2,395,932	161,016	7.20%	3.60%	5.69%
1966	2,480,899	84,967	3.55%	3.60%	5.24%
1967	2,614,340	133,441	5.38%	3.62%	4.76%
1968	2,684,073	69,733	2.67%	3.61%	4.75%
1969	2,807,456	123,383	4.60%	3.62%	4.31%
1970	2,930,810	123,354	4.39%	3.63%	4.20%
1971	3,090,953	160,143	5.46%	3.64%	3.87%
1972	3,218,908	127,955	4.14%	3.65%	4.17%
1973	3,306,658	87,750	2.73%	3.64%	4.20%
1974	3,409,987	103,329	3.12%	3.63%	4.43%
1975	3,572,202	162,215	4.76%	3.64%	4.36%
1976	3,742,749	170,547	4.77%	3.65%	4.59%
1977	3,969,220	226,471	6.05%	3.67%	4.96%
1978	4,166,854	197,634	4.98%	3.68%	5.38%
1979	4,404,121	237,267	5.69%	3.70%	5.40%
1980	4,639,822	235,701	5.35%	3.72%	5.24%
1981	4,920,449	280,627	6.05%	3.73%	5.15%
1982	5,162,619	242,170	4.92%	3.74%	5.15%
1983	5,351,724	189,105	3.66%	3.74%	4.93%
1984	5,641,054	289,330	5.41%	3.76%	4.69%
1985	5,919,483	278,429	4.94%	3.77%	4.56%
1986	6,166,974	247,491	4.18%	3.77%	5.10%
1987	6,394,314	227,340	3.69%	3.77%	5.47%
1988	6,721,210	326,896	5.11%	3.78%	5.30%
1989	7,308,444	587,234	8.74%	3.82%	5.15%
1990	7,761,179	452,735	6.19%	3.84%	5.03%
1991	8,089,848	328,669	4.23%	3.84%	5.06%
1992	8,404,087	314,239	3.88%	3.84%	4.82%
1993	8,689,168	285,081	3.39%	3.84%	4.12%
1994	9,024,368	335,200	3.86%	3.84%	3.79%
1995	9,338,859	314,491	3.48%	3.83%	3.59%
1996	9,692,441	353,582	3.79%	3.83%	3.58%
1997	10,071,783	379,342	3.91%	3.83%	3.52%
1998	10,354,241	282,458	2.80%	3.83%	3.39%
1999	10,752,986	398,745	3.85%	3.83%	3.30%
2000	11,068,861	315,875	2.94%	3.82%	3.08%
2001	11,394,522	325,661	2.94%	3.81%	2.87%
2002	11,721,548	327,026	2.87%	3.81%	2.80%
2003	11,985,254	263,706	2.25%	3.80%	2.60%
2004	12,275,822	290,568	2.42%	3.79%	2.54%
2005	12,560,869	285,047	2.32%	3.78%	2.46%
2006	12,868,606	307,737	2.45%	3.77%	2.38%
2007	13,193,999	325,393	2.53%	3.76%	2.38%
2008	13,508,509	314,510	2.38%	3.75%	2.35%
2009	13,824,854	316,345	2.34%	3.74%	2.35%
2010	14,131,467	306,613	2.22%	3.73%	2.29%
2011	14,441,346	309,879	2.19%	3.72%	2.20%
2012	14,782,473	341,127	2.31%	3.71%	2.10%
2013	15,082,028	299,555	2.03%	3.70%	1.99%
2014	15,372,337	290,309	1.92%	3.69%	1.89%
2015	15,634,199	261,862	1.70%	3.68%	1.75%
2016	15,882,417	248,218	1.59%	3.66%	1.64%
2017	16,118,169	235,752	1.47%	3.65%	1.43%
2018	16,313,735	195,566	1.21%	3.63%	1.28%
2019	16,565,036	251,301	1.54%	3.62%	1.20%
2020	16,663,663	98,627	0.60%	3.60%	1.19%
2021	16,805,400	141,737	0.85%	3.58%	1.19%
2022	17,002,461	197,061	1.17%	3.57%	N/A
2023	17,255,394	252,933	1.49%	3.55%	N/A
2024	17,509,781	254,387	1.47%	3.54%	N/A
2025	17,887,212	377,431	2.16%		

== See also ==
- Membership statistics (LDS Church)
