= The Church of Jesus Christ of Latter-day Saints in Ethiopia =

- Area: Africa Central
- Members: 2,626 (2025)
- Districts: 2
- Branches: 10
- Missions: 1
- FamilySearch Centers: 2

The Church of Jesus Christ of Latter-day Saints in Ethiopia refers to the Church of Jesus Christ of Latter-day Saints (LDS Church) and its members in Ethiopia.

== History ==
Membership in Ethiopia
Year	Membership
1993*	100
1995*	200
1999	257
2004	583
2009	949
2014	1,854
2019	1,803
2024	2,423
2025	2,626
*Membership was published as a rounded number.

The Church has had a presence in Ethiopia since the mid-twentieth century, with Church members employed at foreign embassies holding meetings in their homes, The Church received legal status from the Ethiopian government in 1993, and the Addis Ababa Branch was formed in 1994. The Book of Mormon was published in Amharic in 2000, the result of a three-and-a-half year project by Tigist Negash, an Ethiopian church member and graduate student at Brigham Young University.

=== 1985 famine and worldwide fast ===
From 1983 to 1985, Ethiopia was affected by widespread famine. On 27 January 1985, the Church held a special worldwide fast to raise money for victims of the famine. Church members went without food for two meals and donated the equivalent cost to the Church's humanitarian effort. In total, US$6 million was raised. The funds were donated to Africare, the Red Cross, and Catholic Relief Services. Another fast was held in November 1985, raising another US$5 million for the cause. The project marked the beginning of what would become Latter-day Saint Charities.

== Mission ==
Ethiopia was included in the Kenya Nairobi Mission in 1991, and reassigned to the newly-created Uganda Kampala Mission in 2005. In 2020, the Ethiopia Addis Ababa Mission was organized.

== District and Branches ==
Meetinghouses in Burundi as of May 2026
Orange = District
Purple = Meetinghouse outside of a district

The Addis Ababa Ethiopia District was organized in 2009. As of May 2026, the Church operated the following congregations in Ethiopia:

Addis Ababa Ethiopia District

- Ayat Branch
- Bekulobet Branch
- Magenagna Branch
- Tulu Dimtu Branch
- University Branch

Addis Ababa Ethiopia Bishoftu District

- Adama Branch
- Babogaya Branch
- Debre Zeit Branch
- Dukem Branch

Congregations in Ethiopia Not Part of a District

- Awasa Branch
- Burayu Group
- Ethiopia Addis Ababa Dispersed Members Unit (serving individuals and families not in proximity to a branch/meetinghouse)

The Church also operates a FamilySearch Center in Addis Ababa.

== Temples ==
There are currently no temples in Ethiopia. Ethiopia is currently located in the Nairobi Kenya Temple District, and the Church has also announced its intention to build a temple in Kampala, Uganda.

== See also ==
- Religion in Ethiopia
