= The Church of Jesus Christ of Latter-day Saints in Tanzania =

Latter Day Saints Church in Tanzania

- Area: Africa Central
- Members: 6,259 (2025)
- Stakes: 1
- Districts: 3
- Wards: 4
- Branches: 41
- Total Congregations: 45
- Missions: 1
- FamilySearch Centers: 1

The Church of Jesus Christ of Latter-day Saints in Tanzania refers to the Church of Jesus Christ of Latter-day Saints (LDS Church) and its members in Tanzania. The first branch was organized in 1992. In 2025, there were 6,259 members in 45 congregations.

== History ==
Membership in Tanzania
Year	Membership
1993	100
1999	406
2004	720
2009	950
2014	1,336
2019	1,793
2024	5,022
2025	6,259
*Membership was published as a rounded number.

The first known baptism in Tanzania was for an Indian family Itty Mathew and Grace Sunny Panakkal while they were living in Tanzania in 1982. Robert Muhile was the first Tanzanian to join the Church who was baptized in Cairo, Egypt in 1991.

The first Church meetings in Tanzania were held in 1991 in Dar es Salaam and serviced a few member families from US and Canada living and working in Tanzania. There were 17 members in Tanzania in 1991. Church Leaders visited in 1991 and met with government officials in effort to gain legal recognition. This recognition was granted on October 8, 1992. A branch was created in Dar es Salaam later that month.

In 1998, President Gordon B. Hinckley visited Nairobi, Kenya where some Tanzanian members were in attendance. President Hinckley predicted future growth of the Church in East Africa, stating that tens of thousands of members would one day live in places where there were only hundreds of members at the time. When the Africa Area was divided in 1998, Tanzania became part of the Africa Southeast Area, and in 2019 Tanzania was included in the newly created Africa Central Area.

In 2000, there were three branches in Tanzania, all of which were in Dar es Salaam. In 2002 a temple trip to the Johannesburg South Africa Temple resulted in 27 Tanzanian members receiving their own endowments, 10 families being sealed, and ordinances completed for their deceased ancestors. The trip took 68 hours by bus and was planned for eight months in advance. Only six members were endowed prior to this trip.

Tanzania was dedicated for missionary work by Russell M. Nelson on November 18, 2003. Nelson met with 300 members during his visit and encouraged them to live and share the Gospel principles, adding that the dedication of the country has provided proper direction for further growth. The first district in Tanzania was created in December 2005 in Dar es Salaam comprising the four branches in the city. The Arusha Branch was created from the Arusha Group in 2008.

=== Humanitarian ===
The church and its members have provided several humanitarian service aid and projects. Among them, Members cleansed, beautified, and provided other assistance to two Tanzanian orphanages in 1998 and 2000. The church delivered two shipping containers of food and medical supplies in 2001. In 2009 many service projects were conducted across Africa including a larger project conducted in Tanzania. In 2011, engineering students at Brigham Young University came up with an inexpensive, human-powered drill that could drill the 250 feet (76 m) needed to access clean water in Tanzania.

== Stake, Districts, and Congregations ==
As of April 2026, the following were located in Tanzania
Green = Stake and two districts
Orange = District
Purple = Other Meetinghouse

As of April 2026, Tanzania had the following stake and districts:

Stake/District	Organized
Arusha Tanzania District	20 Nov 2022
Dar es Salaam Tanzania Stake	26 Jan 2025
Dar es Salaam Tanzania Chang'ombe District	13 Nov 2022
Dar es Salaam Tanzania Kigamboni District	15 Feb 2026
Mwanza Tanzania District	18 Jun 2023

Congregations in Tanzania not part of a Stake or District

- Dodoma Branch
- Iringa Branch
- Kigoma Branch
- Kisasi Branch (Dodoma)
- Mbeya Branch
- Morogoro Branch
- Moshi Branch
- Tanzania Dar es Salaam Dispersed Members Unit

The Tanzania Dar es Salaam Dispersed Members Unit coveres portions of Tanzania not in proximity of a meetinghouse. Congregations not part of a stake are called branches, regardless of size. A Family History Center is located in Dar es Salaam.

== Missions ==
Tanzania was part of the newly created Kenya Nairobi Mission when missionaries first came to Tanzania. On July 1, 2020, the Tanzania Dar es Salaam mission was created.

== Temples ==
There are no temples in Tanzania. As of February 2023, Tanzania was located in the Johannesburg South Africa Temple District with the Nairobi Kenya Temple under construction.

== See also ==
- Religion in Tanzania
