= The Church of Jesus Christ of Latter-day Saints in Albania =

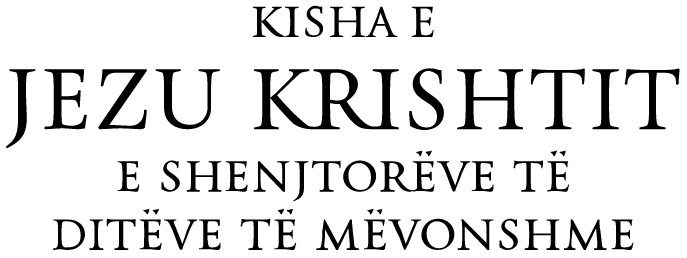
- Logo in Albanian
- Area: Europe Central
- Members: 3,285 (2025)
- Stakes: 1
- Wards: 8
- Branches: 5
- Total Congregations: 13
- Missions: 1
- FamilySearch Centers: 5

The Church of Jesus Christ of Latter-day Saints (LDS Church) has been present in Albania since at least the early 1990s. In 1993, there were approximately 100 members in the country. In 2025, there were 3,285 members in 13 congregations.

== History ==
Membership in Albania
Year	Membership
1993*	100
1995*	200
1999	789
2004	1,400
2009	1,838
2014	2,660
2019	3,216
2024	3,317
2025	3,285
*Membership was published as a rounded number.

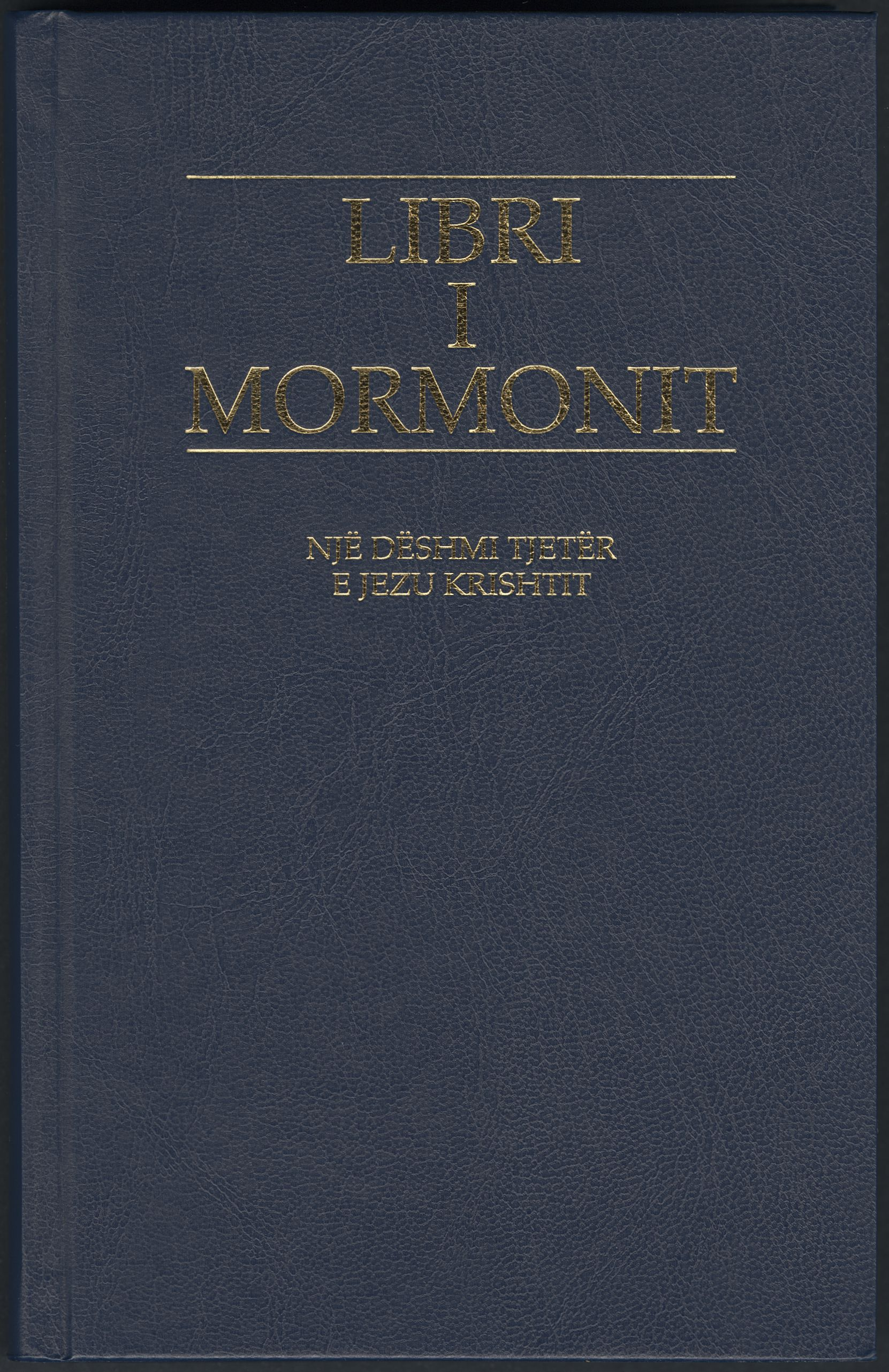
The Book of Mormon in Albanian

Elders Dallin H. Oaks and Hans B. Ringger visited Albania in April 1991. Elder Hans B. Ringger and Austria Vienna Mission President Kenneth D. Reber visited with Albanian officials and agreed to send humanitarian aid. In February 1992, humanitarian missionary couples Thales and Charone Smith and Randolyn Brady and Melvin Brady. Thales taught in the medical school at the University of Tirana and Charone served in a pediatric orphanage. Mel taught business and economics at the University of Tirana, while Randy taught English and music. In August 1993, Mother Teresa visited the orphanage where Charone Smith was working and presented her a silver medallion of Mother Teresa's order.

The first full time missionaries arrived in June. Albania's first convert, Blendi Kokona, was baptized on July 25, 1992. The Book of Mormon was translated into Albanian and published in November 1999. The first seminary class was held on February 24, 2000, and the first Institute class was held on March 24, 2000.

The first Church-built meetinghouse was completed in 2006. Elder D. Todd Christofferson attended an opening of a school for Roma Children in 2009. On March 9, 2014, the Tirana Albania Stake was organized.

== Stake ==
LDS Church Locations as of December 2025
Green = Stake Center and 2 meetinghouse in Tirana (combined in 1 icon)
Purple = meetinghouse
(FHC) = Family History Center

As of December 2025, Albania had five wards and eight branches. The Tirana Albania Stake covers most of the country where the Albania Tirana Mission Branch serves individuals and families in areas in the eastern and southern portions of the country not covered by the stake.

Tirana Albania Stake

- Berat Branch
- Dajti Ward (Tirana)
- Durrës Ward
- Elbasan Branch
- Fier Branch
- Korçë Branch
- Lake Park Ward (Tirana)
- Lushnjë Branch
- New Boulevard Ward (Tirana)
- Pogradec Branch
- Shkodër Branch
- Vlorë Ward

== Missions ==
When missionaries first arrived in Albania, it was part of the Austria Vienna Mission. The Provo Missionary Center began teaching Albanian in 1994. Prior to that, missionaries learned it after arrival in Albania. Responsibility of missionary efforts in Albania was transferred to the Greece Athens Mission in 1995. On July 1, 1996, the Albania Tirana Mission was organized which was later renamed the Adriatic South Mission. In 2023, it was renamed Albania Tirana Mission and serves Albania, Kosovo, and North Macedonia, and in 2026 was further realigned to only cover Albania and Kosovo.

=== Kosovo ===
The LDS Church reported 102 members in 2 congregations in Kosovo for year-end 2017. The LDS Church has not released any membership statistics since. These congregations consist of the Gjakova Branch and the Pristina Branch.

== Temples ==
As of November 2024, the three countries located in the Albania Tirana Mission were part of the Rome Italy Temple District.
