= The Church of Jesus Christ of Latter-day Saints in Palau =

Church in Palau

- Area: Asia North
- Members: 572 (2025)
- Branches: 1
- FamilySearch Centers: 1

The Church of Jesus Christ of Latter-day Saints in Palau refers to the Church of Jesus Christ of Latter-day Saints (LDS Church) and its members in Palau. The first known missionaries arrived on July 5, 1978. As of December 31, 2025, there were 572 members in one branch in Palau. A church family history center shares the same building as the branch.

== History ==
Membership in Palau
Year	Membership
1981	59
1989	208
1999	370
2009	423
2019	509
2025	572

Besides serviceman passing through by way of the islands during World War II, there was no record of Latter-day Saints visiting Palau prior to October 15, 1977 when Heber Butler, a counselor in the Honolulu Mission, visited to investigate the potential for missionary work. The first known missionaries arrived on July 5, 1978. On April 1, 1980, the Palau Branch was formed. The Palau Branch was later renamed the Meyuns Branch.

By 1989, there was 4 small branches and 208 members. A chapel was dedicated in Meyuns in May 1990. The population of these branches included several mainland Chinese workers. The chapel was later torn down after the branch was dissolved, as most of the branches were dissolved to give greater strength to the Koror Topside Branch after several members returned to China. The branch was renamed the Koror Branch in 2010, and the branch was assigned to the Barrigada Guam Stake in September 2018.

== Congregations ==
As of May 2025, there was a single congregation, the Koror Branch, in Palau. This branch is located within the Barrigada Guam Stake.

== Temples ==
Palau is currently in the Yigo Guam Temple district.

== See also ==
- Religion in Palau
