= Membership statistics (LDS Church) =

Membership statistics of the Church of Jesus Christ of Latter-day Saints (worldwide)
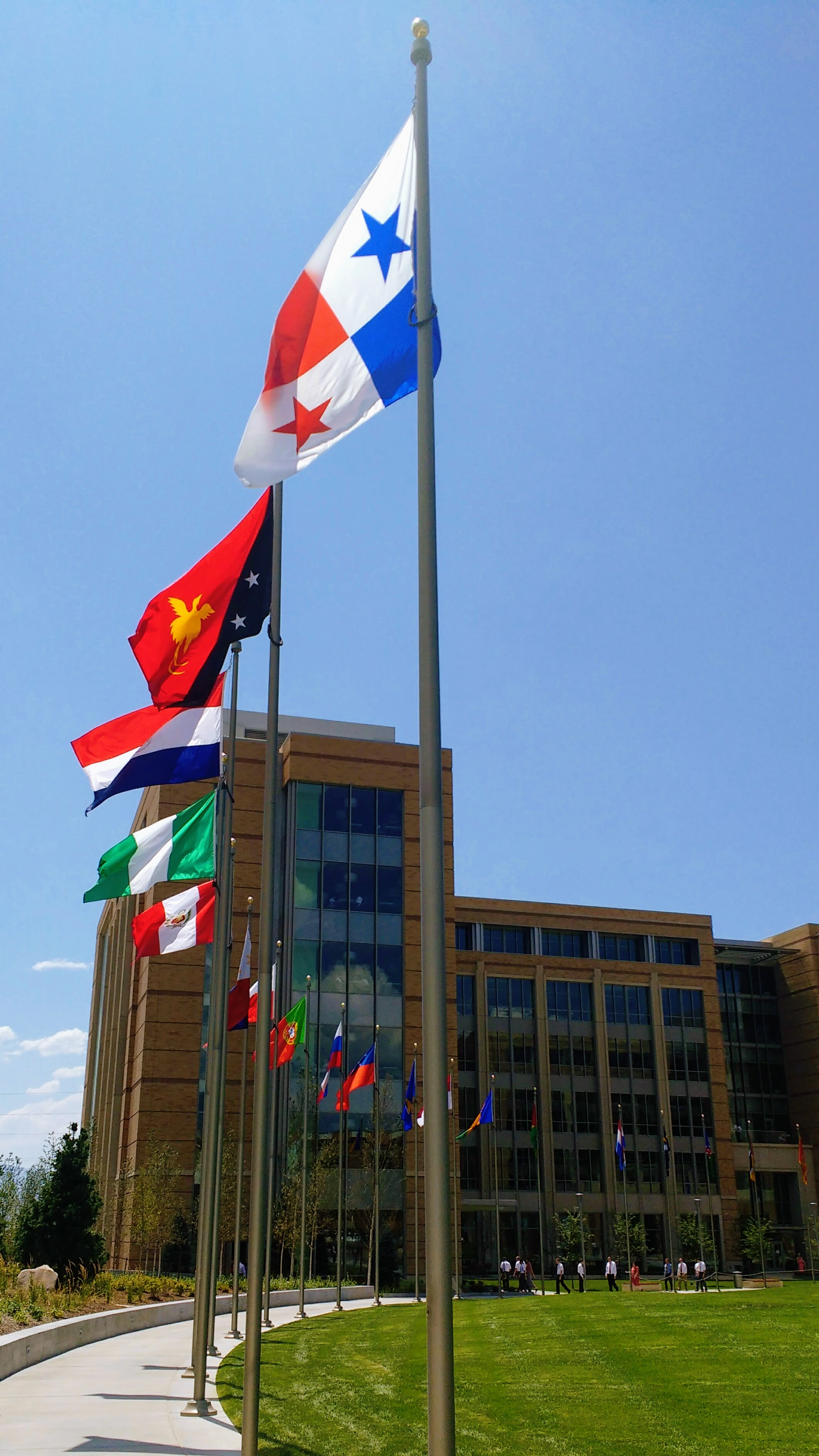
- Flags at the Missionary Training Center in Provo, Utah
- Members: 17,887,212 (2025)
- Stakes: 3,715
- Districts: 480
- Wards: 24,885
- Branches: 7,161
- Total Congregations: 32,046
- Missions: 451
- Temples: 216 operating; 62 under construction; 107 announced; 385 total
- FamilySearch Centers: 6,463

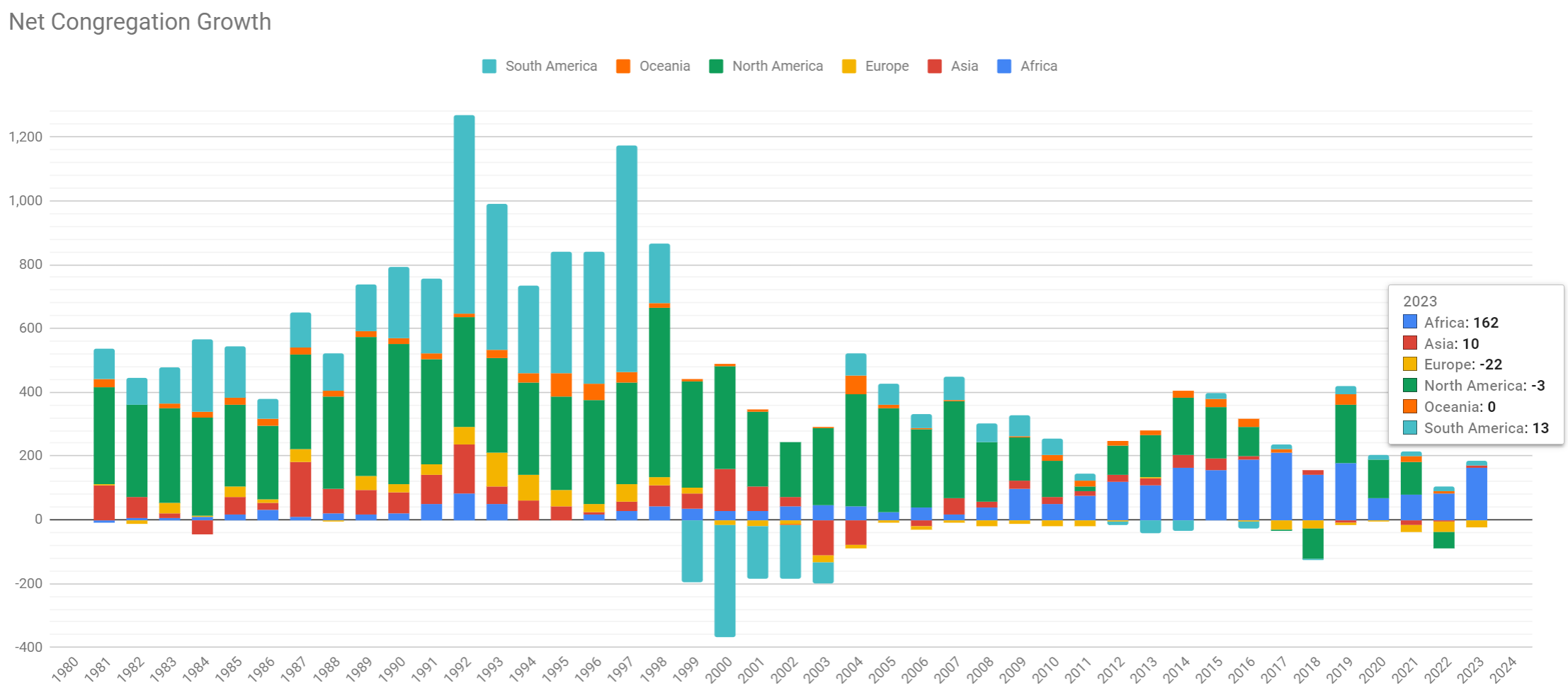
Congregation growth statistics. In 2023 there was a large increase in Africa, and decline in Europe and North America

The Church of Jesus Christ of Latter-day Saints (LDS Church) releases membership, congregational, and related information on a regular basis. The latest membership information the church releases includes a count of membership, stakes, wards, branches, missions, temples, and FamilySearch Centers for the worldwide church and for individual countries and territories where the church is recognized. The latest information released was as of December 31, 2025.

== Membership defined ==
The LDS Church defines membership as a count of living individuals who:

1. have been baptized and confirmed.
2. are under age nine and have been blessed but not baptized.
3. are not accountable because of intellectual disabilities, regardless of age.
4. are unblessed children under age eight when:
  - two member parents request it; or
  - one member parent requests it and the nonmember parent gives permission.

After baptism, blessing, or parental request stated above, membership must be recorded and maintained by the church to have and keep membership. As with many religious organizations, official membership figures reflect individuals on record rather than measures of belief, participation, or self-identification as captured in surveys or census data.

== Membership considerations ==
In 2005, Peggy Fletcher Stack, longtime religion columnist for The Salt Lake Tribune, estimated that about one-third of the reported LDS membership was "active" (i.e., regularly attending church services and participating in other expected meetings and obligations). In 2005, this would have amounted to approximately 4 million active members among a worldwide LDS population of 12 million. Active membership varied from a high of 40 to 50 percent in congregations in North America and the Pacific Islands, to a low of about 25 percent in Latin America. Fletcher Stack's data was compiled from several sources, including a 2001 survey of religious affiliation by scholars at City University of New York and a demographer at LDS-owned Brigham Young University.

In 2001, sociologist Armand Mauss estimated that about 50 percent of LDS converts in the US stopped attending church within a year of baptism, while outside the US the rate was about 70 percent.

More recent survey data complicates this picture. Pew Research Center's 2023–24 Religious Landscape Study (RLS) — the first update to Pew's landscape survey since 2014 — found that Latter-day Saints report the highest rate of monthly in-person religious attendance (76%) of any U.S. religious tradition surveyed, ahead of evangelical Protestants (60%), Muslim Americans and members of historically Black Protestant churches (46% each), Catholics (40%), mainline Protestants (34%), and the national average of 33%. When online and televised religious participation is included alongside in-person attendance, 80% of Latter-day Saints report monthly participation, compared with 71% of evangelical Protestants and a 40% national average. Latter-day Saints also report the highest rate of personal congregational membership of any tradition surveyed (86%), compared with 61% of evangelical Protestants, 56% of members of historically Black Protestant churches, and 37% of U.S. adults overall.

US Church membership by Christian tradiiton

Pew's broader 2023–24 RLS also found that Christianity as a whole continues to lose more adherents than it gains through religious switching, and that the share of Americans identifying as Christian has been relatively stable since 2019 after declining sharply from 2007 to 2019; the share of Americans identifying as Latter-day Saints specifically has held roughly steady at around 2% since 2007.

Independent research also cautions that self-reported religious attendance — the kind captured in surveys like Pew's — tends to run well above attendance measured through independent observation, a pattern found across every religious tradition studied, including the LDS Church. A 2024 University of Chicago Becker Friedman Institute study by economist Devin Pope used smartphone geolocation data for over two million Americans in 2019 to estimate actual, rather than self-reported, worship attendance. The study found that only about 5% of Americans attend religious services in a typical week, compared with roughly 22% who report doing so in surveys.

The study's findings were broken out by tradition. Observed weekly attendance among Latter-day Saints was about 14–15%, roughly triple the national average and, in raw numbers, slightly higher than observed weekly Catholic attendance nationwide despite Catholics outnumbering Latter-day Saints roughly 14 to 1. Latter-day Saint congregations also had among the longest average service durations (115 minutes) and the lowest income diversity among co-congregants of the traditions studied.

Self-reported vs. observed religious attendance, by tradition
Tradition	Self-reported attendance (Pew RLS, 2023–24)	Observed weekly attendance (Pope/BFI, 2024)
Latter-day Saints	76% (monthly, in person)	~14–15% (weekly)
Evangelical Protestants	60% (monthly, in person)	~7% of Protestants overall (weekly)
Catholics	40% (monthly, in person)	~2% (weekly)
All U.S. adults	33% (monthly) / 25% (weekly)	~5% (weekly)

The two studies use different attendance thresholds — Pew's headline figures are monthly self-reports, while Pope's cellphone-based figures measure observed weekly attendance — so the table above contrasts claimed regular practice against an independently observed weekly rate rather than providing a strict like-for-like ratio. Even so, the gap between self-reported and independently measured attendance is not specific to the LDS Church; every tradition Pope measured showed some degree of self-report inflation, and Catholics showed the steepest proportional gap of the three named traditions. This is a relevant caveat when interpreting any denomination's self-reported activity rate, including the figures above.

== Countries ==
The tables on this section represents Latter-day Saint membership, as reported by the Church, as of December 31, 2025. Except where indicated, general population figures are based on population estimates (primarily for 2025). Percentages of LDS members were calculated with this information. The link under the names of each country, territory, etc. corresponds to brief LDS history and statistical information for that particular area.

=== Congregations ===
Country	Area	Temples				Missions	Districts	Stakes	Congregations (Note: This does not include member groups, only congregations organized as ward or branch.)			FSC
Country	Area	O	U	A	T	Missions	Districts	Stakes	Wards	Branches	Total	FSC
Albania	Europe Central	0	0	0	0	1	0	1	8	5	13	5
American Samoa	Pacific	0	1	0	1	0	0	5	38	6	44	6
Angola	Africa South	0	0	1	1	1	3	2	13	20	33	2
Antigua and Barbuda	Caribbean	0	0	0	0	0	0	0	0	1	1	1
Argentina	SA South	5	0	2	7	14	25	80	506	236	742	236
Armenia	Eurasian	0	0	0	0	1	1	0	0	8	8	4
Aruba	Caribbean	0	0	0	0	0	0	0	0	2	2	2
Australia	Pacific	5	0	2	7	5	4	40	232	68	300	137
Austria	Europe Central	0	0	1	1	0	0	2	14	3	17	12
Azerbaijan	Europe Central	0	0	0	0	0	0	0	0	1	1	0
Bahamas	Caribbean	0	0	0	0	0	0	0	0	3	3	1
Bahrain	ME/AN	0	0	0	0	0	0	1	1	0	1	0
Barbados	Caribbean	0	0	0	0	1	1	0	0	3	3	1
Belarus	Eurasian	0	0	0	0	0	0	0	1	0	1	0
Belgium	Europe Central	0	1	0	1	0	0	2	9	5	14	8
Belize	Central America	0	0	0	0	0	2	0	0	12	12	4
Benin	Africa West	0	0	0	0	1	1	2	22	12	34	4
Bermuda	United States	0	0	0	0	0	0	0	0	1	1	0
Bolivia	SA Northwest	1	1	1	3	6	8	33	220	70	290	72
Bonaire	Caribbean	0	0	0	0	0	0	0	0	1	1	1
Bosnia and Herzegovina	Europe Central	0	0	0	0	0	0	0	0	1	1	0
Botswana	Africa South	0	0	0	0	1	1	1	7	16	23	4
Brazil	Brazil	11	6	7	24	37	34	289	1,650	358	2,008	611
British Virgin Islands	Caribbean	0	0	0	0	0	0	0	0	1	1	0
Bulgaria	Europe Central	0	0	0	0	1	1	0	0	7	7	4
Burundi	Africa Central	0	0	0	0	0	1	0	0	12	12	1
Cambodia	Asia	0	1	0	1	2	4	2	9	21	30	12
Cameroon	Africa Central	0	0	0	0	1	1	1	5	15	20	3
Canada	Canada	9	1	1	11	6	3	56	359	142	501	115
Cape Verde	Europe North	1	0	0	1	1	1	4	28	18	46	9
Cayman Islands	Caribbean	0	0	0	0	0	0	0	0	1	1	0
Central African Republic	Africa Central	0	0	0	0	0	1	0	0	3	3	0
China (Note: Congregational info for China is not released by the LDS Church)	Asia	0	0	1	1	0	0	0	0	0	0	0
Chile	SA South	3	1	2	6	11	9	81	456	122	578	145
Colombia	SA Northwest	2	1	1	4	5	9	32	182	78	260	73
Cook Islands	Pacific	0	0	0	0	0	1	0	0	5	5	3
Costa Rica	Central America	1	0	0	1	2	1	10	61	20	81	30
Croatia	Europe Central	0	0	0	0	1	1	0	0	5	5	4
Cuba	Caribbean	0	0	0	0	0	2	0	0	10	10	0
Curaçao	Caribbean	0	0	0	0	0	0	0	0	1	1	1
Cyprus	Europe Central	0	0	0	0	0	0	0	0	5	5	4
Czech Republic	Europe Central	0	0	0	0	1	0	1	7	5	12	2
Democratic Republic of the Congo	Africa Central	1	1	2	4	7	10	44	322	109	431	58
Denmark	Europe North	1	0	0	1	1	0	2	13	8	21	13
Dominica	Caribbean	0	0	0	0	0	0	0	0	1	1	0
Dominican Republic	Caribbean	1	0	1	2	4	9	22	145	58	203	61
Ecuador	SA Northwest	2	0	0	2	7	5	44	276	62	338	74
Egypt	ME/AN	0	0	0	0	0	0	0	0	2	2	0
El Salvador	Central America	1	0	1	2	3	0	22	126	28	154	52
Estonia	Europe North	0	0	0	0	0	1	0	0	4	4	2
Eswatini	Africa South	0	0	0	0	0	1	0	0	6	6	2
Ethiopia	Africa Central	0	0	0	0	1	2	0	0	10	10	2
Federated States of Micronesia	Asia North	0	0	0	0	0	1	1	5	17	22	11
Fiji	Pacific	1	0	0	1	1	1	4	26	26	52	11
Finland	Europe North	1	0	0	1	1	0	3	18	11	29	29
France	Europe Central	1	0	0	1	2	0	10	70	39	109	71
French Guiana	Caribbean	0	0	0	0	0	0	0	0	1	1	1
French Polynesia	Pacific	1	0	1	2	1	0	11	74	20	94	30
Gabon	Africa Central	0	0	0	0	0	1	0	0	5	5	0
Gambia	Africa West	0	0	0	0	0	0	0	0	2	2	0
Georgia	Eurasian	0	0	0	0	0	0	0	0	3	3	1
Germany	Europe Central	2	0	1	3	5	0	14	97	49	146	99
Ghana	Africa West	1	1	1	3	6	13	31	216	185	401	89
Greece	Europe Central	0	0	0	0	0	0	0	0	2	2	2
Grenada	Caribbean	0	0	0	0	0	0	0	0	1	1	0
Guadeloupe	Caribbean	0	0	0	0	0	1	0	0	3	3	1
Guam	Asia North	1	0	0	1	1	0	1	4	0	4	3
Guatemala	Central America	3	2	1	6	7	10	51	296	145	441	145
Guernsey	Europe North	0	0	0	0	0	0	0	0	1	1	0
Guinea	Africa West	0	0	0	0	0	1	0	0	3	3	0
Guyana	Caribbean	0	0	0	0	1	2	0	0	12	12	4
Haiti	Caribbean	1	0	0	1	1	4	5	31	25	56	14
Honduras	Central America	2	0	0	2	4	5	31	180	62	242	89
Hong Kong	Asia	1	0	0	1	1	1	4	20	6	26	9
Hungary	Europe Central	0	0	1	1	1	2	1	5	14	19	12
Iceland	Europe North	0	0	0	0	0	0	0	0	4	4	1
India	Asia	0	1	0	1	2	3	4	21	26	47	22
Indonesia	Asia	0	0	1	1	1	1	2	16	8	24	12
Ireland	Europe North	0	0	1	1	0	0	1	6	6	12	3
Isle of Man	Europe North	0	0	0	0	0	0	0	1	0	1	0
Israel	ME/AN	0	0	0	0	0	0	0	0	3	3	0
Italy	Europe Central	1	0	1	2	2	0	10	62	29	91	60
Ivory Coast	Africa West	1	0	0	1	4	9	23	174	100	274	57
Jamaica	Caribbean	0	0	0	0	1	1	1	6	12	18	8
Japan	Asia North	4	0	1	5	7	9	22	142	88	230	56
Jersey	Europe North	0	0	0	0	0	0	0	0	1	1	1
Jordan	ME/AN	0	0	0	0	0	0	0	0	1	1	0
Kazakhstan	Eurasian	0	0	0	0	0	0	0	0	3	3	1
Kenya	Africa Central	1	0	0	1	2	10	4	23	79	102	17
Kiribati	Pacific	0	1	0	1	0	2	4	20	25	45	3
Kosovo	Europe Central	0	0	0	0	0	0	0	0	2	2	0
Kuwait	ME/AN	0	0	0	0	0	0	0	1	0	1	0
Latvia	Europe North	0	0	0	0	1	1	0	0	4	4	3
Lebanon	ME/AN	0	0	0	0	0	0	0	0	1	1	0
Lesotho	Africa South	0	0	0	0	0	1	0	0	8	8	2
Liberia	Africa West	0	0	1	1	1	2	7	51	35	86	17
Lithuania	Europe North	0	0	0	0	0	1	0	0	5	5	4
Luxembourg	Europe Central	0	0	0	0	0	0	0	2	0	2	1
Macau	Asia	0	0	0	0	0	0	0	0	2	2	1
Madagascar	Africa South	0	1	0	1	2	1	5	30	22	52	16
Malawi	Africa South	0	0	0	0	0	1	2	10	11	21	3
Malaysia	Asia	0	0	0	0	0	5	0	0	24	24	10
Mali	Africa West	0	0	0	0	0	0	0	0	1	1	0
Malta	Europe Central	0	0	0	0	0	0	0	0	1	1	1
Marshall Islands	Pacific	0	0	0	0	1	0	2	12	1	13	3
Martinique	Caribbean	0	0	0	0	0	0	0	0	1	1	1
Mauritius	Africa South	0	0	0	0	0	1	0	0	3	3	0
Mexico	Mexico	14	3	10	27	34	42	231	1,401	474	1,875	588
Moldova	Europe North	0	0	0	0	0	0	0	0	2	2	1
Mongolia	Asia North	0	0	1	1	1	1	2	12	12	24	13
Montenegro	Europe Central	0	0	0	0	0	0	0	0	1	1	1
Morocco	ME/AN	0	0	0	0	0	0	0	0	2	2	0
Mozambique	Africa South	0	0	2	2	2	3	10	59	31	90	18
Namibia	Africa South	0	0	0	0	0	1	0	0	5	5	2
Nauru	Pacific	0	0	0	0	0	0	0	0	1	1	0
Netherlands	Europe Central	1	0	0	1	1	0	3	19	5	24	10
New Caledonia	Pacific	0	0	1	1	0	0	1	6	3	9	3
New Zealand	Pacific	2	1	0	3	3	2	28	171	48	219	56
Nicaragua	Central America	0	1	0	1	2	4	12	71	38	109	38
Nigeria	Africa West	1	2	4	7	11	13	80	569	311	880	153
Niue	Pacific	0	0	0	0	0	0	0	0	1	1	1
North Macedonia	Europe Central	0	0	0	0	0	0	0	0	1	1	0
Northern Mariana Islands	Asia North	0	0	0	0	0	0	0	1	0	1	1
Norway	Europe North	0	0	1	1	1	0	2	10	9	19	16
Oman	ME/AN	0	0	0	0	0	0	0	0	1	1	0
Pakistan	Asia	0	0	0	0	1	4	0	0	19	19	0
Palau	Asia North	0	0	0	0	0	0	0	0	1	1	1
Panama	Central America	1	0	0	1	1	4	7	48	32	80	28
Papua New Guinea	Pacific	0	1	0	1	2	8	6	33	63	96	2
Paraguay	SA South	1	0	0	1	2	9	11	63	72	135	31
Peru	SA Northwest	4	0	6	10	15	17	118	684	125	809	211
Philippines	Philippines	4	4	6	14	26	49	141	890	480	1,370	192
Poland	Europe Central	0	0	0	0	1	1	0	0	11	11	7
Portugal	Europe North	1	0	1	2	2	1	8	47	17	64	24
Puerto Rico	Caribbean	1	0	0	1	1	1	5	27	11	38	13
Qatar	ME/AN	0	0	0	0	0	0	0	2	1	3	0
Republic of the Congo	Africa Central	0	1	0	1	1	0	5	32	11	43	10
Réunion	Africa South	0	0	0	0	0	1	0	0	4	4	5
Romania	Europe Central	0	0	0	0	1	1	0	0	15	15	3
Russia	Eurasian	0	0	1	1	3	4	2	11	40	51	0
Rwanda	Africa Central	0	0	0	0	1	1	0	0	10	10	0
Saint Kitts and Nevis	Caribbean	0	0	0	0	0	0	0	0	1	1	1
Saint Lucia	Caribbean	0	0	0	0	0	0	0	0	2	2	2
Saint Vincent and the Grenadines	Caribbean	0	0	0	0	0	1	0	0	3	3	1
Samoa	Pacific	1	0	1	2	1	0	20	162	8	170	20
Senegal	Africa West	0	0	0	0	0	1	0	0	5	5	0
Serbia	Europe Central	0	0	0	0	0	0	0	0	1	1	2
Sierra Leone	Africa West	0	1	0	1	2	3	11	78	40	118	22
Singapore	Asia	0	1	0	1	1	0	1	6	0	6	1
Sint Maarten	Caribbean	0	0	0	0	0	0	0	0	1	1	1
Slovakia	Europe Central	0	0	0	0	0	1	0	0	4	4	1
Slovenia	Europe Central	0	0	0	0	0	0	0	0	2	2	1
Solomon Islands	Pacific	0	0	0	0	0	0	0	0	10	10	0
South Africa	Africa South	2	1	0	3	4	9	18	112	85	197	106
South Korea	Asia North	1	0	1	2	3	5	12	60	39	99	24
South Sudan	Africa Central	0	0	0	0	0	0	0	0	1	1	0
Spain	Europe Central	1	0	1	2	3	1	17	95	55	150	56
Sri Lanka	Asia	0	0	0	0	0	1	0	0	4	4	3
Suriname	Caribbean	0	0	0	0	0	1	0	0	6	6	3
Sweden	Europe North	1	0	0	1	1	1	4	25	13	38	38
Switzerland	Europe Central	1	0	0	1	0	0	5	26	8	34	13
Taiwan	Asia	1	1	0	2	2	0	16	87	10	97	16
Tanzania	Africa Central	0	0	0	0	1	3	1	4	41	45	1
Thailand	Asia	1	0	0	1	2	2	4	21	23	44	29
Timor-Leste	Asia	0	0	0	0	0	0	0	0	1	1	0
Togo	Africa West	0	0	0	0	0	0	3	19	12	31	4
Tonga	Pacific	1	1	0	2	1	2	21	141	34	175	24
Trinidad and Tobago	Caribbean	0	0	0	0	0	0	1	5	5	10	2
Tunisia	ME/AN	0	0	0	0	0	0	0	0	1	1	0
Turkey	Europe Central	0	0	0	0	0	1	0	0	7	7	0
Turks and Caicos Islands	Caribbean	0	0	0	0	0	0	0	0	1	1	0
Tuvalu	Pacific	0	0	0	0	0	0	0	0	1	1	0
Uganda	Africa Central	0	0	1	1	1	4	4	26	36	62	17
Ukraine	Europe North	1	0	0	1	2	3	2	11	30	41	35
United Arab Emirates	ME/AN	0	0	1	1	0	0	1	5	1	6	1
United Kingdom	Europe North	2	1	1	4	6	0	41	257	41	298	121
United States	United States	101	24	33	158	120	13	1,742	12,821	1,820	14,641	1,598
United States Virgin Islands	Caribbean	0	0	0	0	0	1	0	0	2	2	0
Uruguay	SA South	1	0	0	1	2	2	18	100	32	132	43
Vanuatu	Pacific	0	1	0	1	1	2	2	11	32	43	3
Venezuela	Caribbean	1	0	1	2	4	6	33	176	59	235	91
Vietnam	Asia	0	0	0	0	1	2	0	0	11	11	0
Zambia	Africa South	0	0	0	0	1	2	1	6	14	20	5
Zimbabwe	Africa South	1	0	0	1	2	2	12	77	46	123	32

*There are several areas that cover the US. This includes United States Central, United States Northeast, North America Southeast, North America Southwest, North America West, and Utah areas. Bermuda is in the North America Northeast area.

=== Members and growth ===
See Membership defined for membership definition.

Country (Note: December 31, 2025 Information released by the LDS Church. For countries without released info, the most recent year of released info or estimate were used.)	Area	2025 Members	Population	%LDS	2015 Members	Change	Growth (%)	% of total growth
Albania	Europe Central	3,285	2,402,113	0.137%	2,799	486	17.36%	0.022%
American Samoa	Pacific	17,646	49,710	35.498%	16,149	1,497	9.27%	0.066%
Angola	Africa South	8,779	35,121,734	0.025%	1,908	6,871	360.12%	0.305%
Antigua and Barbuda	Caribbean	366	103,603	0.353%	191	175	91.62%	0.008%
Argentina	SA South	505,819	47,067,641	1.075%	438,056	67,763	15.47%	3.008%
Armenia	Eurasian	3,579	3,075,800	0.116%	3,525	54	1.53%	0.002%
Aruba	Caribbean	686	107,566	0.638%	534	152	28.46%	0.007%
Australia	Pacific	165,272	27,309,396	0.605%	146,443	18,829	12.86%	0.836%
Austria	Europe Central	4,753	9,198,214	0.052%	4,641	112	2.41%	0.005%
Bahamas	Caribbean	1,125	398,165	0.283%	1,006	119	11.83%	0.005%
Bahrain	ME/AN	231	1,588,670	0.015%	180	51	28.33%	0.002%
Barbados	Caribbean	1,082	267,800	0.404%	949	133	14.01%	0.006%
Belgium	Europe Central	7,164	11,812,354	0.061%	6,756	408	6.04%	0.018%
Belize	Central America	5,741	410,919	1.397%	5,152	589	11.43%	0.026%
Benin	Africa West	8,286	12,910,087	0.064%	2,255	6,031	267.45%	0.268%
Bolivia	SA Northwest	235,773	11,312,620	2.084%	195,516	40,257	20.59%	1.787%
Bosnia and Herzegovina	Europe Central	91	3,264,873	0.003%	64	27	42.19%	0.001%
Botswana	Africa South	5,465	2,410,338	0.227%	3,167	2,298	72.56%	0.102%
Brazil	Brazil	1,573,360	212,583,750	0.74%	1,326,738	246,622	18.59%	10.946%
Bulgaria	Europe Central	2,424	6,445,481	0.038%	2,424	0	0%	0%
Burundi	Africa Central	2,070	12,837,740	0.016%	597	1,473	246.73%	0.065%
Cambodia	Asia	18,070	17,336,307	0.104%	13,349	4,721	35.37%	0.21%
Cameroon	Africa Central	3,673	28,758,503	0.013%	1,480	2,193	148.18%	0.097%
Canada	Canada	211,581	41,528,680	0.509%	193,850	17,731	9.15%	0.787%
Cape Verde	Europe North	18,030	491,233	3.67%	12,786	5,244	41.01%	0.233%
Cayman Islands	Caribbean	264	84,738	0.312%	201	63	31.34%	0.003%
Central African Republic	Africa Central	357	6,470,307	0.006%	219	138	63.01%	0.006%
Chile	SA South	624,203	20,086,377	3.108%	581,155	43,048	7.41%	1.911%
Colombia	SA Northwest	223,090	52,695,952	0.423%	193,350	29,740	15.38%	1.32%
Cook Islands	Pacific	1,890	15,040	12.566%	1,835	55	3%	0.002%
Costa Rica	Central America	58,373	5,309,625	1.099%	46,116	12,257	26.58%	0.544%
Croatia	Europe Central	739	3,859,686	0.019%	597	142	23.79%	0.006%
Curacao	Caribbean	639	155,826	0.41%	541	98	18.11%	0.004%
Cyprus	Europe Central	701	966,400	0.073%	445	256	57.53%	0.011%
Czech Republic	Europe Central	2,787	10,909,500	0.026%	2,503	284	11.35%	0.013%
Democratic Republic of the Congo	Africa Central	159,771	109,276,000	0.146%	47,929	111,842	233.35%	4.964%
Denmark	Europe North	4,426	5,992,734	0.074%	4,410	16	0.36%	0.001%
Dominica	Caribbean	180	67,408	0.267%	167	13	7.78%	0.001%
Dominican Republic	Caribbean	156,358	10,771,504	1.452%	129,017	27,341	21.19%	1.214%
Ecuador	SA Northwest	279,046	16,938,986	1.647%	234,606	44,440	18.94%	1.972%
El Salvador	Central America	132,399	6,029,976	2.196%	122,799	9,600	7.82%	0.426%
Estonia	Europe North	1,149	1,369,285	0.084%	1,123	26	2.32%	0.001%
Eswatini	Africa South	2,598	1,236,126	0.21%	1,837	761	41.43%	0.034%
Ethiopia	Africa Central	2,626	109,499,000	0.002%	1,903	723	37.99%	0.032%
Federated States of Micronesia	Asia North	6,241	105,754	5.901%	5,732	509	8.88%	0.023%
Fiji	Pacific	24,847	900,869	2.758%	18,912	5,935	31.38%	0.263%
Finland	Europe North	5,024	5,639,600	0.089%	4,961	63	1.27%	0.003%
France	Europe Central	40,546	68,609,000	0.059%	37,996	2,550	6.71%	0.113%
French Guiana	Caribbean	522	292,354	0.179%	383	139	36.29%	0.006%
French Polynesia	Pacific	30,350	279,890	10.844%	25,841	4,509	17.45%	0.2%
Georgia	Eurasian	498	3,694,600	0.013%	289	209	72.32%	0.009%
Germany	Europe Central	42,229	83,555,478	0.051%	39,726	2,503	6.3%	0.111%
Ghana	Africa West	122,978	33,007,618	0.373%	67,398	55,580	82.47%	2.467%
Greece	Europe Central	818	10,400,720	0.008%	759	59	7.77%	0.003%
Grenada	Caribbean	429	112,579	0.381%	387	42	10.85%	0.002%
Guadeloupe	Caribbean	628	378,561	0.166%	507	121	23.87%	0.005%
Guam	Asia North	2,768	153,836	1.799%	2,295	473	20.61%	0.021%
Guatemala	Central America	297,143	17,843,132	1.665%	261,013	36,130	13.84%	1.604%
Guernsey	Europe North	60	64,781	0.093%	48	12	25%	0.001%
Guyana	Caribbean	7,400	772,975	0.957%	5,648	1,752	31.02%	0.078%
Haiti	Caribbean	27,550	11,867,032	0.232%	21,414	6,136	28.65%	0.272%
Honduras	Central America	197,073	9,892,632	1.992%	169,140	27,933	16.51%	1.24%
Hong Kong	Asia	24,930	7,534,200	0.331%	24,856	74	0.3%	0.003%
Hungary	Europe Central	5,274	9,540,000	0.055%	5,176	98	1.89%	0.004%
Iceland	Europe North	445	389,450	0.114%	274	171	62.41%	0.008%
India	Asia	15,664	1,413,324,000	0.001%	12,701	2,963	23.33%	0.132%
Indonesia	Asia	7,655	282,477,584	0.003%	7,182	473	6.59%	0.021%
Ireland	Europe North	4,923	5,380,300	0.092%	3,437	1,486	43.24%	0.066%
Isle of Man	Europe North	285	84,530	0.337%	316	−31	-9.81%	-0.001%
Israel	ME/AN	422	10,045,100	0.004%	216	206	95.37%	0.009%
Italy	Europe Central	30,105	58,934,177	0.051%	26,248	3,857	14.69%	0.171%
Ivory Coast	Africa West	71,182	29,389,150	0.242%	32,258	38,924	120.66%	1.728%
Jamaica	Caribbean	7,856	2,825,544	0.278%	6,008	1,848	30.76%	0.082%
Japan	Asia North	131,776	123,440,000	0.107%	128,216	3,560	2.78%	0.158%
Jersey	Europe North	269	103,267	0.26%	320	−51	-15.94%	-0.002%
Kazakhstan	Eurasian	245	20,316,155	0.001%	275	−30	-10.91%	-0.001%
Kenya	Africa Central	24,547	52,428,290	0.047%	12,898	11,649	90.32%	0.517%
Kiribati	Pacific	23,585	120,740	19.534%	17,462	6,123	35.06%	0.272%
Kuwait	ME/AN	369	4,913,271	0.008%	305	64	20.98%	0.003%
Latvia	Europe North	1,281	1,850,100	0.069%	1,215	66	5.43%	0.003%
Lesotho	Africa South	2,278	2,306,000	0.099%	873	1,405	160.94%	0.062%
Liberia	Africa West	25,767	5,248,621	0.491%	9,675	16,092	166.33%	0.714%
Lithuania	Europe North	1,024	2,889,402	0.035%	982	42	4.28%	0.002%
Luxembourg	Europe Central	526	672,050	0.078%	427	99	23.19%	0.004%
Macau	Asia	1,595	688,300	0.232%	1,410	185	13.12%	0.008%
Madagascar	Africa South	20,395	30,811,969	0.066%	10,859	9,536	87.82%	0.423%
Malawi	Africa South	7,857	20,270,568	0.039%	2,143	5,714	266.64%	0.254%
Malaysia	Asia	11,769	34,157,500	0.034%	9,725	2,044	21.02%	0.091%
Malta	Europe Central	320	563,443	0.057%	189	131	69.31%	0.006%
Marshall Islands	Pacific	6,927	42,418	16.33%	7,233	−306	-4.23%	-0.014%
Martinique	Caribbean	285	4,927,532	0.006%	213	72	33.8%	0.003%
Mauritius	Africa South	612	1,244,477	0.049%	471	141	29.94%	0.006%
Mexico	Mexico	1,572,287	130,294,079	1.207%	1,394,708	177,579	12.73%	7.882%
Moldova	Europe North	471	2,423,300	0.019%	375	96	25.6%	0.004%
Mongolia	Asia North	13,250	3,504,741	0.378%	11,250	2,000	17.78%	0.089%
Montenegro	Europe Central	65	623,633	0.01%	17	48	282.35%	0.002%
Mozambique	Africa South	39,282	33,244,414	0.118%	8,584	30,698	357.62%	1.363%
Namibia	Africa South	1,492	3,022,401	0.049%	848	644	75.94%	0.029%
Nauru	Pacific	146	11,680	1.25%	103	43	41.75%	0.002%
Netherlands	Europe Central	9,027	18,060,445	0.05%	9,017	10	0.11%	0%
New Caledonia	Pacific	2,585	268,510	0.963%	2,320	265	11.42%	0.012%
New Zealand	Pacific	120,992	5,356,700	2.259%	111,141	9,851	8.86%	0.437%
Nicaragua	Central America	106,953	6,803,886	1.572%	92,152	14,801	16.06%	0.657%
Nigeria	Africa West	274,043	223,800,000	0.122%	142,033	132,010	92.94%	5.859%
Niue	Pacific	400	1,681	23.795%	302	98	32.45%	0.004%
Northern Mariana Islands	Asia North	938	47,329	1.982%	793	145	18.28%	0.006%
Norway	Europe North	4,547	5,594,340	0.081%	4,681	−134	-2.86%	-0.006%
Palau	Asia North	572	16,733	3.418%	491	81	16.5%	0.004%
Panama	Central America	63,936	4,064,780	1.573%	51,818	12,118	23.39%	0.538%
Papua New Guinea	Pacific	46,583	11,781,559	0.395%	24,780	21,803	87.99%	0.968%
Paraguay	SA South	106,345	6,109,644	1.741%	90,627	15,718	17.34%	0.698%
Peru	SA Northwest	667,836	34,038,457	1.962%	568,559	99,277	17.46%	4.406%
Philippines	Philippines	905,082	114,123,600	0.793%	728,295	176,787	24.27%	7.847%
Poland	Europe Central	2,315	37,470,000	0.006%	1,861	454	24.4%	0.02%
Portugal	Europe North	50,341	10,639,726	0.473%	43,240	7,101	16.42%	0.315%
Puerto Rico	Caribbean	26,947	3,203,295	0.841%	23,191	3,756	16.2%	0.167%
Republic of the Congo	Africa Central	15,482	6,142,180	0.252%	6,413	9,069	141.42%	0.403%
Réunion	Africa South	989	896,175	0.11%	917	72	7.85%	0.003%
Romania	Europe Central	3,127	19,064,409	0.016%	3,043	84	2.76%	0.004%
Russia	Eurasian	18,306	146,028,325	0.013%	22,720	−4,414	-19.43%	-0.196%
Rwanda	Africa Central	3,625	13,798,561	0.026%	344	3,281	953.78%	0.146%
Saint Kitts and Nevis	Caribbean	292	51,320	0.569%	211	81	38.39%	0.004%
Saint Lucia	Caribbean	435	184,100	0.236%	338	97	28.7%	0.004%
Saint Vincent and the Grenadines	Caribbean	767	110,872	0.692%	621	146	23.51%	0.006%
Samoa	Pacific	90,706	205,557	44.127%	77,353	13,353	17.26%	0.593%
Senegal	Africa West	338	18,847,519	0.002%	20	318	1590%	0.014%
Serbia	Europe Central	422	6,605,168	0.006%	359	63	17.55%	0.003%
Sierra Leone	Africa West	41,775	8,884,032	0.47%	16,155	25,620	158.59%	1.137%
Singapore	Asia	3,262	6,036,900	0.054%	3,611	−349	-9.66%	-0.015%
Sint Maarten	Caribbean	358	41,349	0.866%	244	114	46.72%	0.005%
Slovakia	Europe Central	334	5,419,451	0.006%	255	79	30.98%	0.004%
Slovenia	Europe Central	466	2,129,052	0.022%	433	33	7.62%	0.001%
Solomon Islands	Pacific	3,232	750,325	0.431%	794	2,438	307.05%	0.108%
South Africa	Africa South	78,689	63,015,904	0.125%	62,600	16,089	25.7%	0.714%
South Korea	Asia North	89,092	51,183,336	0.174%	87,296	1,796	2.06%	0.08%
Spain	Europe Central	71,995	49,077,984	0.147%	53,933	18,062	33.49%	0.802%
Sri Lanka	Asia	1,732	21,763,170	0.008%	1,367	365	26.7%	0.016%
Suriname	Caribbean	1,991	616,500	0.323%	1,483	508	34.25%	0.023%
Sweden	Europe North	9,569	10,587,970	0.09%	9,541	28	0.29%	0.001%
Switzerland	Europe Central	9,630	9,027,859	0.107%	9,072	558	6.15%	0.025%
Taiwan	Asia	63,425	23,374,742	0.271%	58,756	4,669	7.95%	0.207%
Tanzania	Africa Central	6,259	61,741,120	0.01%	1,456	4,803	329.88%	0.213%
Thailand	Asia	24,825	65,932,105	0.038%	20,730	4,095	19.75%	0.182%
Togo	Africa West	8,349	8,095,498	0.103%	3,279	5,070	154.62%	0.225%
Tonga	Pacific	69,594	100,179	69.47%	63,392	6,202	9.78%	0.275%
Trinidad and Tobago	Caribbean	3,458	1,368,333	0.253%	3,405	53	1.56%	0.002%
Turkey	Europe Central	808	85,664,944	0.001%	439	369	84.05%	0.016%
Tuvalu	Pacific	381	10,643	3.58%	222	159	71.62%	0.007%
Uganda	Africa Central	26,304	45,905,417	0.057%	14,289	12,015	84.09%	0.533%
Ukraine	Europe North	10,014	32,962,000	0.03%	11,559	−1,545	-13.37%	-0.069%
United Arab Emirates	ME/AN	2,002	10,678,556	0.019%	1,524	478	31.36%	0.021%
United Kingdom	Europe North	190,066	68,265,209	0.278%	186,423	3,643	1.95%	0.162%
United States	United States	6,929,770	340,110,988	2.038%	6,531,656	398,114	6.1%	17.67%
United States Virgin Islands	Caribbean	704	87,146	0.808%	599	105	17.53%	0.005%
Uruguay	SA South	112,449	3,499,451	3.213%	103,477	8,972	8.67%	0.398%
Vanuatu	Pacific	14,042	321,409	4.369%	7,237	6,805	94.03%	0.302%
Venezuela	Caribbean	179,389	28,405,543	0.632%	165,527	13,862	8.37%	0.615%
Zambia	Africa South	7,823	19,610,769	0.04%	3,577	4,246	118.7%	0.188%
Zimbabwe	Africa South	52,430	16,751,469	0.313%	27,825	24,605	88.43%	1.092%

*There are several areas that cover the US and Canada. This includes North America Central, North America Northeast, North America Southeast, North America Southwest, North America West, and Utah areas. Bermuda is in the North America Northeast area.

== Distribution maps ==
=== Membership ===
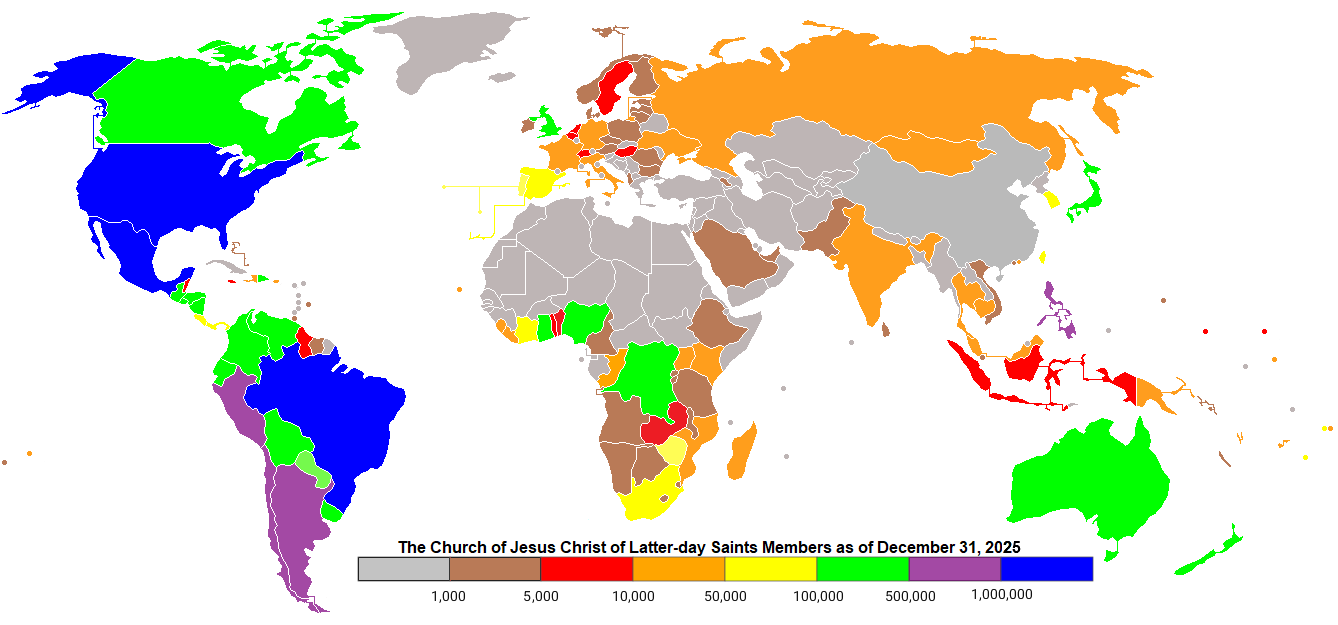
The Church of Jesus Christ of Latter-day Saints membership record count by country as of December 31, 2025, or the latest data or estimate available for country data not published by the church for that year

=== Percent members ===
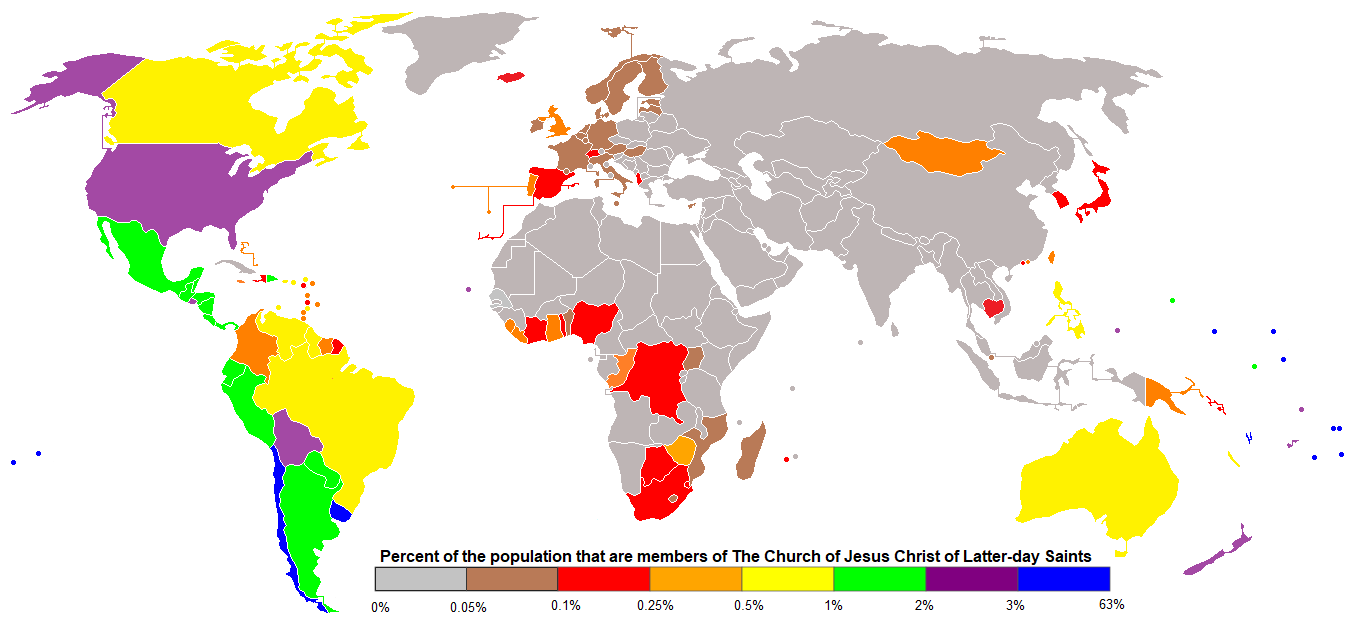
Percentage of overall population who are members of the church of Jesus Christ of Latter-day Saints by Country or territory. Membership count used for percentage was as of December 31, 2025 or the latest data or estimate available for country data not published by the church for that year.

=== Congregations ===
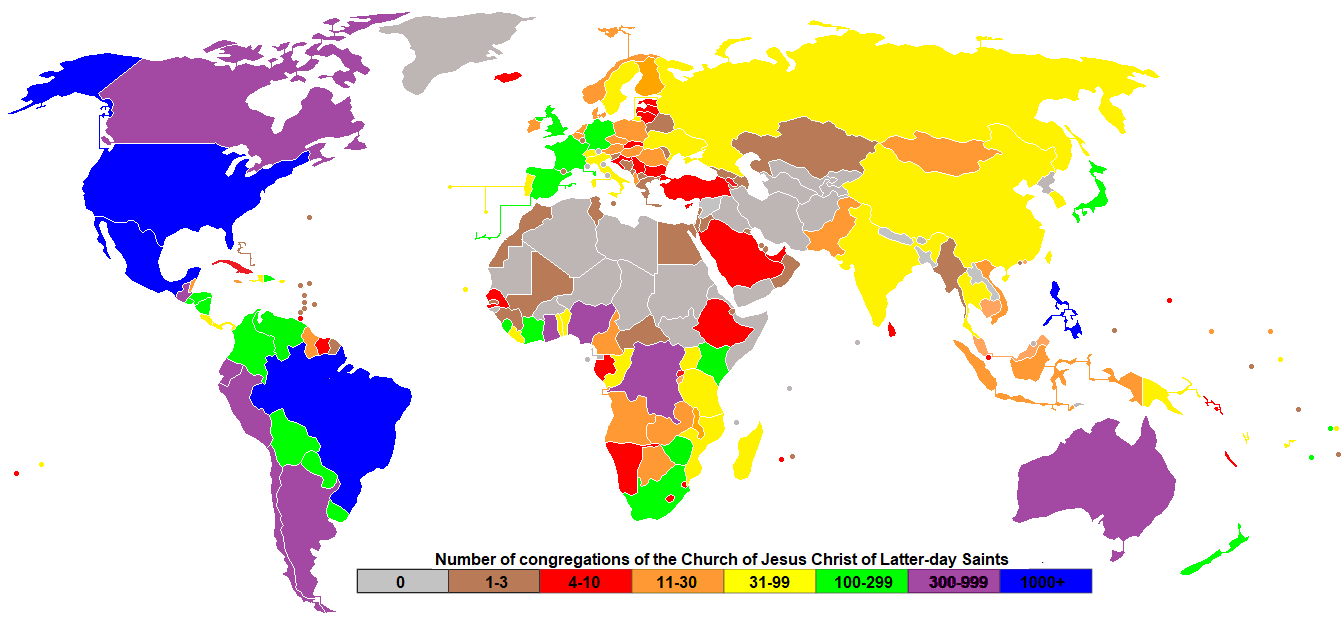
Number of congregations of the church of Jesus Christ of Latter-day Saints as of December 31, 2025 or the latest data or estimate available for country data not published by the church for that year. Only wards and branches were counted as congregations and does not include member groups.

=== Areas ===
Areas of the Church of Jesus Christ of Latter-day Saints outside US and Canada.	Areas of the Church of Jesus Christ of Latter-day Saints in the US and Canada.

=== Temples ===
Worldwide temples
- = Operating
- = Under construction
- = Announced
- = Temporarily Closed

== See also ==
- Membership history of the Church of Jesus Christ of Latter-day Saints
- United States membership statistics (LDS Church)
- Canada membership statistics (LDS Church)
- Mormons
- Mormonism
