= The Church of Jesus Christ of Latter-day Saints in Sri Lanka =

- Area: Asia
- Members: 1,732 (2025)
- Districts: 1
- Branches: 4
- FamilySearch Centers: 3

The Church of Jesus Christ of Latter-day Saints in Sri Lanka refers to the Church of Jesus Christ of Latter-day Saints (LDS Church) and its members in Sri Lanka. The first branch was organized in 1978 and has since grown to four congregations. Between 2015 and 2019 membership increased by roughly 20%.

== History ==
Membership in Sri Lanka
| Year | Membership |
|---|---|
| 1985 | 67 |
| 1990 | 135 |
| 1995* | 200 |
| 1999 | 280 |
| 2004 | 851 |
| 2009 | 1,307 |
| 2014 | 1,352 |
| 2019 | 1,631 |
| 2024 | 1,709 |
| 2025 | 1,732 |
*Membership was published as an estimated or rounded number. Source: Windall J. Ashton; Jim M. Wall, Deseret News, various years, Church Almanac Country Information: Sri Lanka

Two Mormon missionaries, Chauncey W. West and Benjamin F. Dewey, arrived in Ceylon in May 1853. They briefly labored in Galle and Colombo but could find neither a hall in which to preach nor a person to listen to their message, thanks largely to the influence of anti-Mormon tracts and newspaper articles. They remained in the country only a short time before returning to India.

The LDS Church's next official contact with Sri Lanka was in August 1975, when two missionaries en route home from the church's Singapore Mission were assigned to stop in Sri Lanka to explore the prospects for initiating missionary work. They reported favorably.

In 1976, Clarence Long, a Latter-day Saint from Texas, visited Colombo on business and became acquainted with Reginald and Easvary Rasiah and presented them with a copy of the Book of Mormon. Their son, Rosignald Rasiah traveled to the United States to work for Long and was baptized in Texas in June 1977. Reginald and Easvary Rasiah were baptized in August 1977, and a few of their family members and others were baptized in ensuing months.

The Sri Lanka Branch of the church was organized in March 1978 with Reginald Rasiah as president. The church was officially registered in March 1979.

In 1979, the church's Genealogical Society of Utah started microfilming Sri Lanka's vital records. The LDS Church and the Rotary Club in Columbo worked together to start a program to teach English as a second language in February 1982.

Several senior couples served in Sri Lanka beginning in the late 1970s. They did not actively proselytize, but taught those who requested more information about the church. Missionaries were removed from the country at different times due to civil war. Sri Lanka had one branch and 135 members in 1990. Limited numbers of young foreign missionaries were allowed to serve there beginning about the late 1990s. This led to accelerated church growth.

The first chapel in Sri Lanka was dedicated in December 2001. In 2003, membership reached 783.

=== Tsunami relief ===
After the 2004 Asian tsunami, the LDS Church brought aid and other assistance to the tsunami devastated countries, including Sri Lanka. Relief supplies, including food, hygiene, and educational kits, were given to those affected by the tsunami. The church assisted in building villages. Among other aids and services, the church built more than 650 boats and gave micro-credit loans to hundreds of women to support each other in various livelihood efforts.

Thousands of hygiene kits were distributed.

In addition to giving humanitarian aid, youth in Long Beach California wrote letters of comfort, friendship and encouragement which were hand-delivered to children in Sri Lanka.

Members of the Geneva Switzerland Stake made and provided hygiene kits and collected several tons clothing and bedding for tsunami devastated countries, including Sri Lanka.

Some Latter-day Saints in Virginia traveled to Sri Lanka at their own expense and formed a group called "Sri Lankan Help". When they arrived in Sri Lanka this group saw people were receiving basic needs like food and water, but many psychological needs were not being addressed. They addressed this need by performing various acts of kindness.

Merrill Osmond, a member of the LDS Church, performed at a Tsunami Relief Fund-raiser hosted by the Los Angeles World Affairs Council.

== Colombo Sri Lanka District ==
Meetinghouses in Sri Lanka
Green = District center and meetinghouse
Purple = meetinghouse
(FHC)=Family History Center in building

The Colombo Sri Lanka District encompasses the country of Sri Lanka. As of May 2025, there were five branches in Sri Lanka, namely:

- Chilaw Branch
- Colombo Branch
- Kandy Branch
- Negombo Branch

All congregations in a district are considered a branch regardless of size and participation.

== Missions ==
The country was within the boundaries of the church's Singapore Mission until 1 November 2007, at which time it came under the direction of the India Bangalore Mission at the same time the India New Delhi Mission was formed.

== Temples ==
Sri Lanka was part of the Hong Kong China Temple district until the completion of the Bangkok Thailand Temple in 2023. It is anticipated that it will be encompassed within the Bengaluru India Temple district once that temple is completed.

== See also ==
- Christianity in Sri Lanka
