= The Church of Jesus Christ of Latter-day Saints in the Czech Republic =

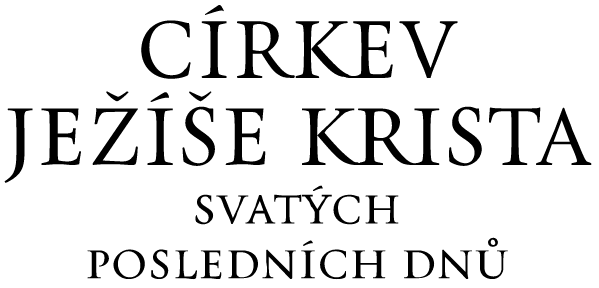
- (Logo in Czech)

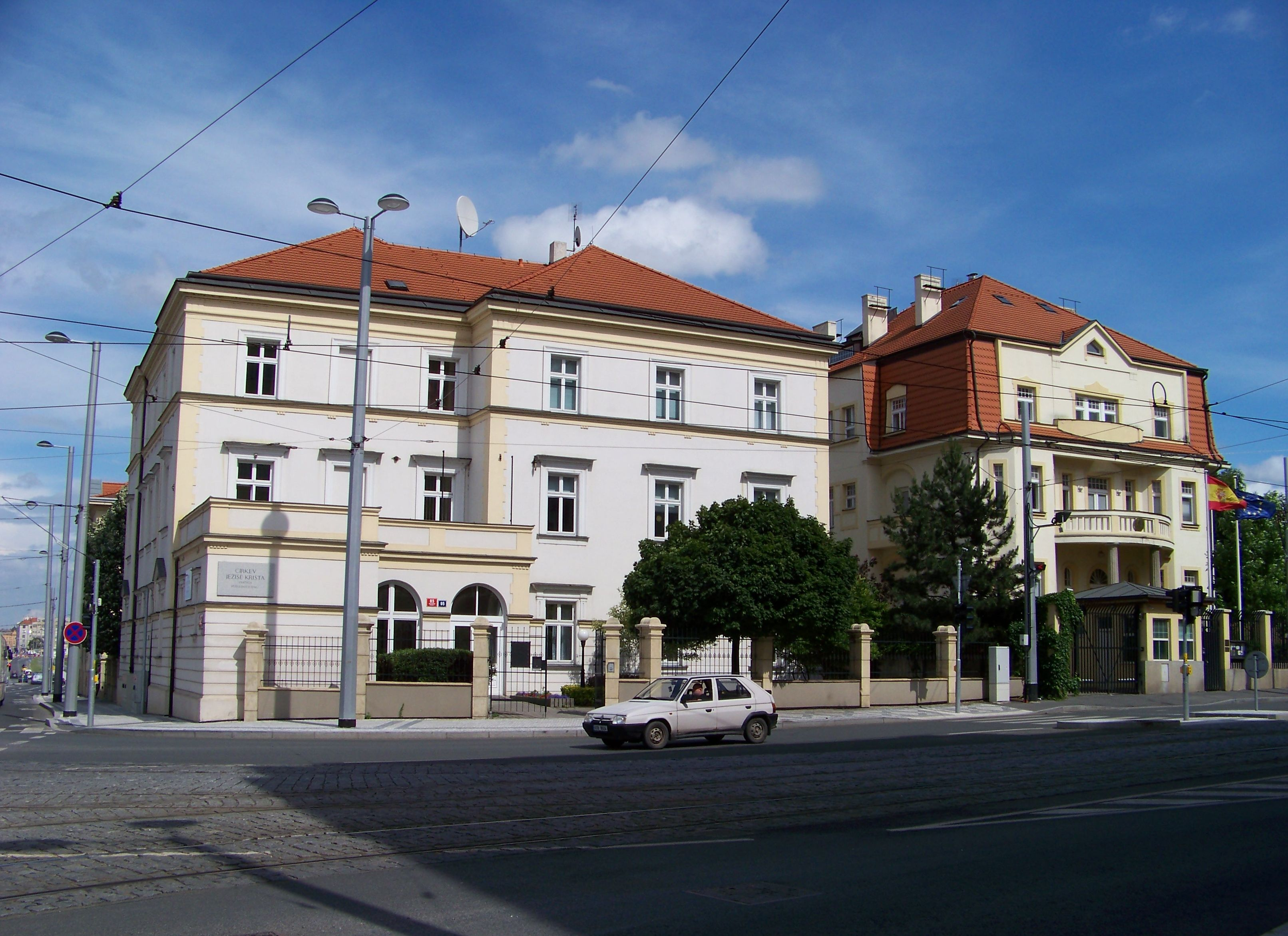
- The building on the corner is a meetinghouse of The Church of Jesus Christ of Latter-day Saints, which also houses a Family History Center and other church offices. The building to the right is the Spanish Embassy.
- Area: Europe Central
- Members: 2,787 (2025)
- Stakes: 1
- Wards: 7
- Branches: 5
- Total congregations: 12
- Missions: 1
- FamilySearch Centers: 2

The Church of Jesus Christ of Latter-day Saints in the Czech Republic (Czech: Církev Ježíše Krista Svatých posledních dnů v České republice) refers to the Church of Jesus Christ of Latter-day Saints (LDS Church) and its members in the Czech Republic. At year-end 1989, there were less than 100 members in the Czech Republic. In 2025, there were 2,787 members in 12 congregations.

== History ==
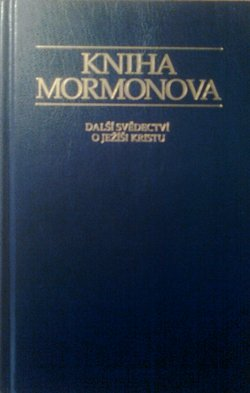
The Czech translation of the Book of Mormon, originally published in 1933.

Membership in the Czech Republic
Year	Membership
1989	<100
1999	1,654
2009	2,093
2019	2,636
2025	2,787
*Membership was published as a rounded number.

Age structure of the LDS Church in the Czech Republic according to data obtained during the 2011 Census of Population, Houses and Apartments. Data source: Czech Statistical Office

=== During the Austro-Hungarian Empire ===
The first missionaries to reach the area now part of the Czech Republic were Thomas Biesinger and Paul Hammer who arrived in Prague during March 1884 as part of a mission to Austria-Hungary. Prostelysing was illegal and Biesinger was convicted for his activities and spent a total of 68 days in captivity. Upon his release he managed to convert one of the witnesses who had got him imprisoned, one Antonin Just, and he would be the first person baptised into the LDS church on Czech soil.

=== As part of Czechoslovakia ===
A mission to Czechoslovakia was created July 24, 1929 by John A. Widtsoe and the first Czech language Book of Mormons were printed in February 1933.

In 1936 Wallace Toronto became the second president of the Czechoslovak mission and would remain president for 36 years, a record for LDS mission presidents.

After a brief evacuation of missionaries during the Sudetenland crisis in 1938, the US leaders in the Czechoslovak mission began preparing local members to take over should another evacuation be necessary. Following the German invasion of Czechoslovakia in March 1939 the church reduced the amount of missionary work and focussed mostly on their baptised members. Four American missionaries were arrested by the Gestapo over charges relating to foreign currency and were held in solitary confinement for over a month. Whilst their Mission President negotiated for their release he received word from church headquarters to begin evacuating the Czechoslovak mission. After successfully arranging the release of the missionaries the evacuation was completed by 31 August 1939 In the ten years from the start of the Czechoslovak mission until the evacuation, 137 converts were baptised and 57 missionaries had served.

On 28 June 1946 Toronto and two missionaries entered the country and re-established the mission after a 7-year absence.

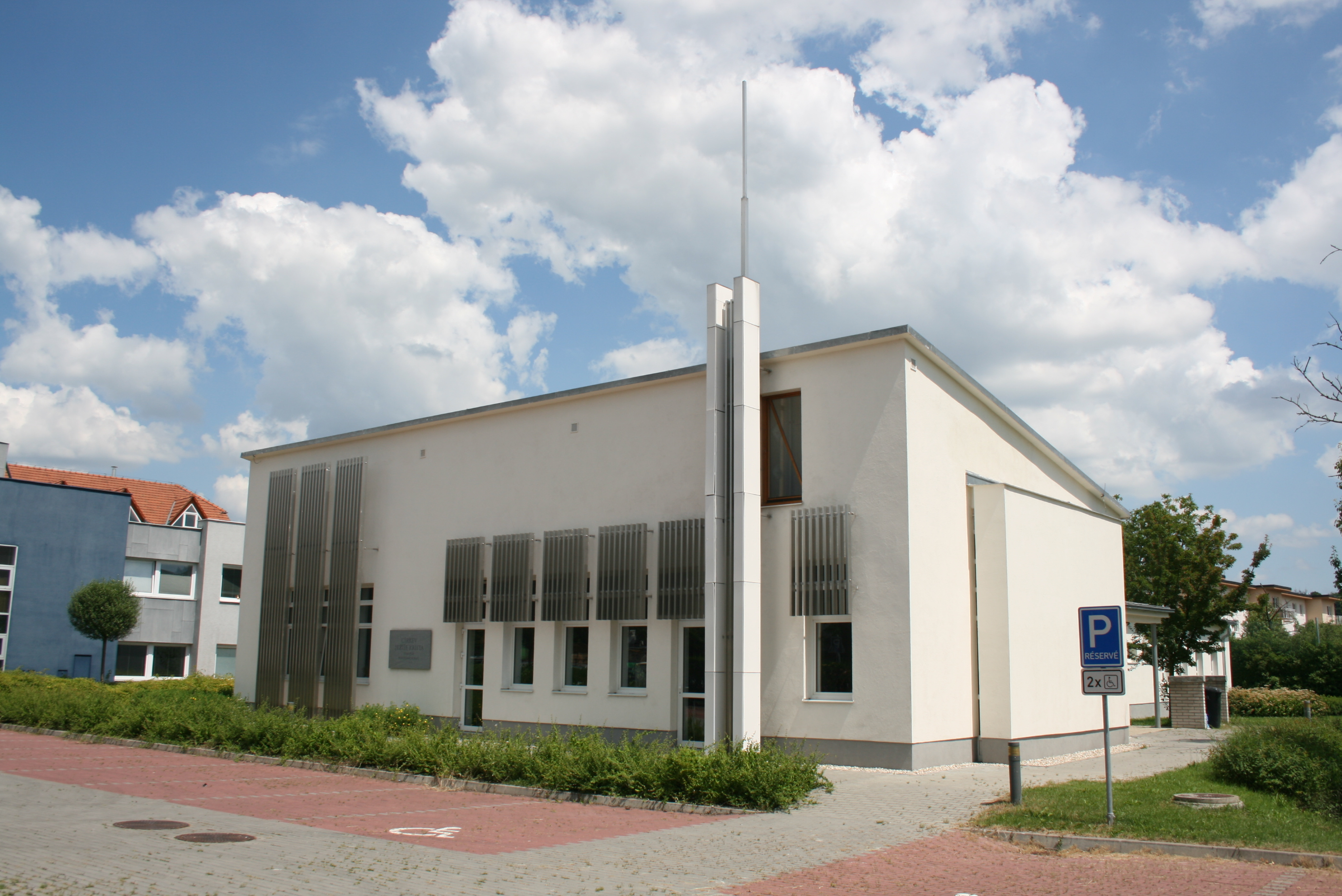
Meetinghouse of The Church of Jesus Christ of Latter-day Saints in Brno.

In 1949 the, now Communist, government of Czechoslovakia stopped issuing permits to LDS missionaries, effectively rendering their presence in the country illegal. In 1950 the Czechoslovak police arrested two LDS Missionaries and held them incommunicado for three weeks. The Czechoslovak mission was closed shortly afterward when it became apparent that their release was contingent on the mission closure. This had been the only mission in an East European Communist country Local members continued to operate services, though the church was no longer recognised by the government.

Missionaries returned to Czechoslovakia in 1990.

=== After the Velvet Divorce ===
In 2016, the LDS Church created its first stake in the Czech Republic.

== Stake and congregations ==
LDS Church Locations as of September 2026
Green = Stake Center and meetinghouse
Purple = meetinghouse
(FHC) = Family History Center

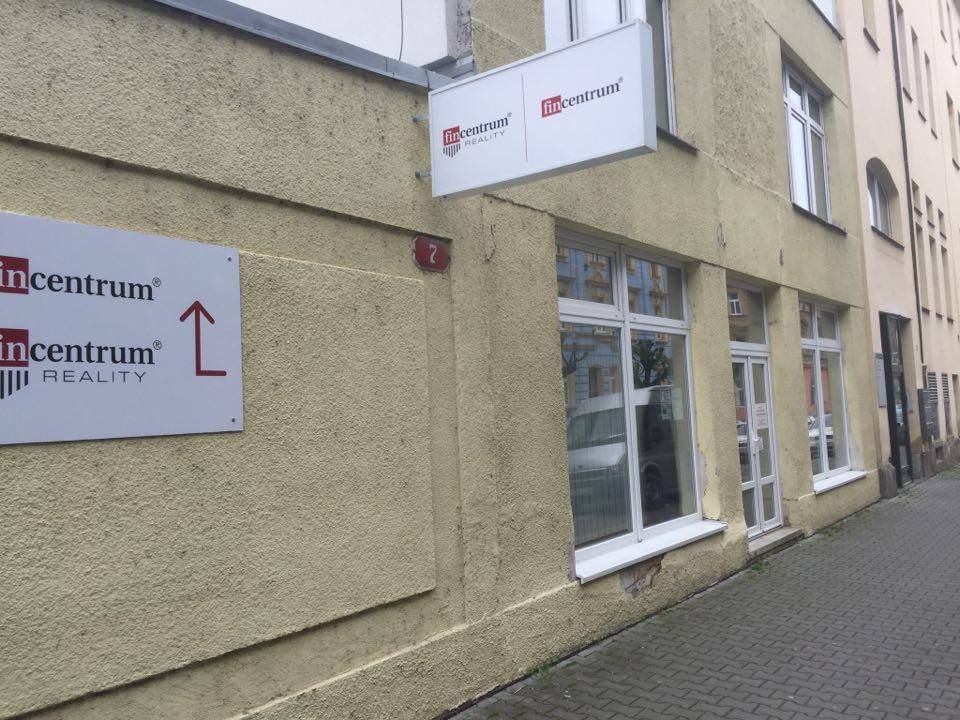
Plzeň branch of the Church of Jesus Christ of Latter-day Saints at Zikmunda Wintra 7

As of September 2026, the following congregations are located in the Prague Czech Republic Stake which encompasses the entire country:

Prague Czech Republic Stake

- Brno Ward
- České Budějovice Branch
- Hradec Králové Ward
- Jihlava Branch
- Jičín Ward
- Liberec Branch
- Olomouc Branch
- Ostrava Ward
- Plzeň Ward
- Praha 1st Ward
- Praha 2nd Branch (English)
- Třebíč Branch
- Uherské Hradiště Ward

== Missions ==
The Czech/Slovak Mission is headquartered in Prague. It emcompases the countries of Czech Republic and Slovakia.

== Temples ==
As of December 2025, the Czech Republic was part of the Freiberg Germany Temple district.

== See also ==
- Religion in the Czech Republic
