= The Church of Jesus Christ of Latter-day Saints in West Virginia =

- Area: US Northeast
- Members: 17,663 (2025)
- Stakes: 4
- Wards: 25
- Branches: 14
- Total Congregations: 39
- Missions: 1
- FamilySearch Centers: 14

The Church of Jesus Christ of Latter-day Saints in West Virginia refers to the Church of Jesus Christ of Latter-day Saints (LDS Church) and its members in West Virginia. The official church membership as a percentage of general population was 0.92% in 2014. According to the 2014 Pew Forum on Religion & Public Life survey, roughly 2% of West Virginians self-identify themselves most closely with The Church of Jesus Christ of Latter-day Saints. The LDS Church is the 9th largest denomination in West Virginia.

== History ==
Membership in West Virginia
Year	Membership
1930	2,285
1983	8,304
1989*	10,000
1999	12,290
2009	16,711
2019	17,143
2025	17,663
*Membership was published as a rounded number. Source: Wendall J. Ashton; Jim M. Wall, Deseret News, various years, Church Almanac State Information: West Virginia

Joseph Smith visited West Virginia in 1832 and that same year, two missionaries for the Church baptized 40 converts in the state.

In 1884, a congregation of 26 people was organized in the area.

On August 23, 1970, the first stake in West Virginia was organized in Charleston. Ezra Taft Benson, then an apostle of the church, presided at the organization of the stake.

== Stakes ==
As of July 2026:

Stake	Organized	Mission	Temple District
Buena Vista Virginia Stake (Note: Stake located outside West Virginia with congregation(s) meeting in West Virginia)	6 Jun 1999	West Virginia Charleston	Richmond Virginia
Charleston West Virginia Stake	23 Aug 1970	West Virginia Charleston	Columbus Ohio
Clarksburg West Virginia Stake	6 May 1979	West Virginia Charleston	Pittsburgh Pennsylvania
Huntington West Virginia Stake	7 Nov 1982	West Virginia Charleston	Louisville Kentucky
Martinsburg West Virginia Stake	29 Feb 2004	Maryland Baltimore	Washington D.C.
Pembroke Virginia Stake	14 May 1978	West Virginia Charleston	Richmond Virginia
Pittsburgh Pennsylvania West Stake	7 Sep 2014	Pennsylvania Pittsburgh	Pittsburgh Pennsylvania
Waynesboro Virginia Stake	28 May 1978	Virginia Richmond	Richmond Virginia
Winchester Virginia Stake	22 May 1977	Maryland Baltimore	Washington D.C.

== Mission ==
- West Virginia Charleston Mission

== Temples ==
West Virginia is divided among the Washington D.C. Temple, Louisville Kentucky Temple, Pittsburgh Pennsylvania Temple, and Columbus Ohio Temple districts.

== See also ==
- The Church of Jesus Christ of Latter-day Saints membership statistics (United States)
- Religion in West Virginia
