= The Church of Jesus Christ of Latter-day Saints in Iowa =

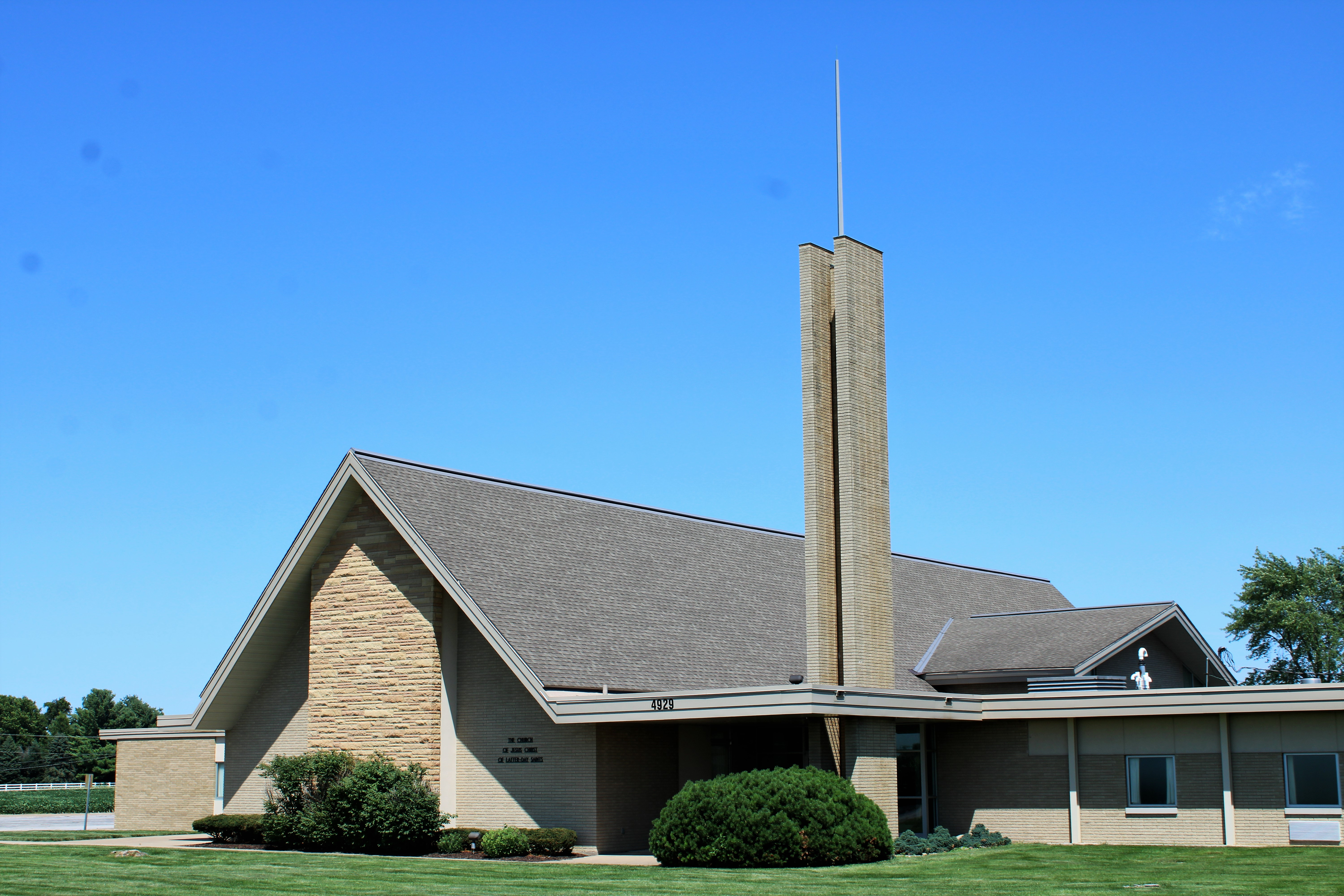
- The Davenport Iowa Stake Center
- Area: US Central
- Members: 29,981 (2025)
- Stakes: 8
- Wards: 44
- Branches: 25
- Total Congregations: 69
- Missions: 1
- Temples: 1 announced
- FamilySearch Centers: 30

The Church of Jesus Christ of Latter-day Saints in Iowa refers to the Church of Jesus Christ of Latter-day Saints (LDS Church) and its members in Iowa. The official church membership as a percentage of general population was 0.87% in 2014. According to the 2014 Pew Forum on Religion & Public Life survey, less than 1% of Iowans self-identify themselves most closely with the Church of Jesus Christ of Latter-day Saints. The LDS Church is the 13th largest denomination in Iowa.

== History ==
Membership in Iowa
Year	Membership
1983	9,322
1989*	11,000
1999	17,465
2009	23,519
2019	28,408
2025	29,981
*Membership was published as a rounded number. Source: Wendall J. Ashton; Jim M. Wall, Deseret News, various years, Church Almanac State Information: Iowa

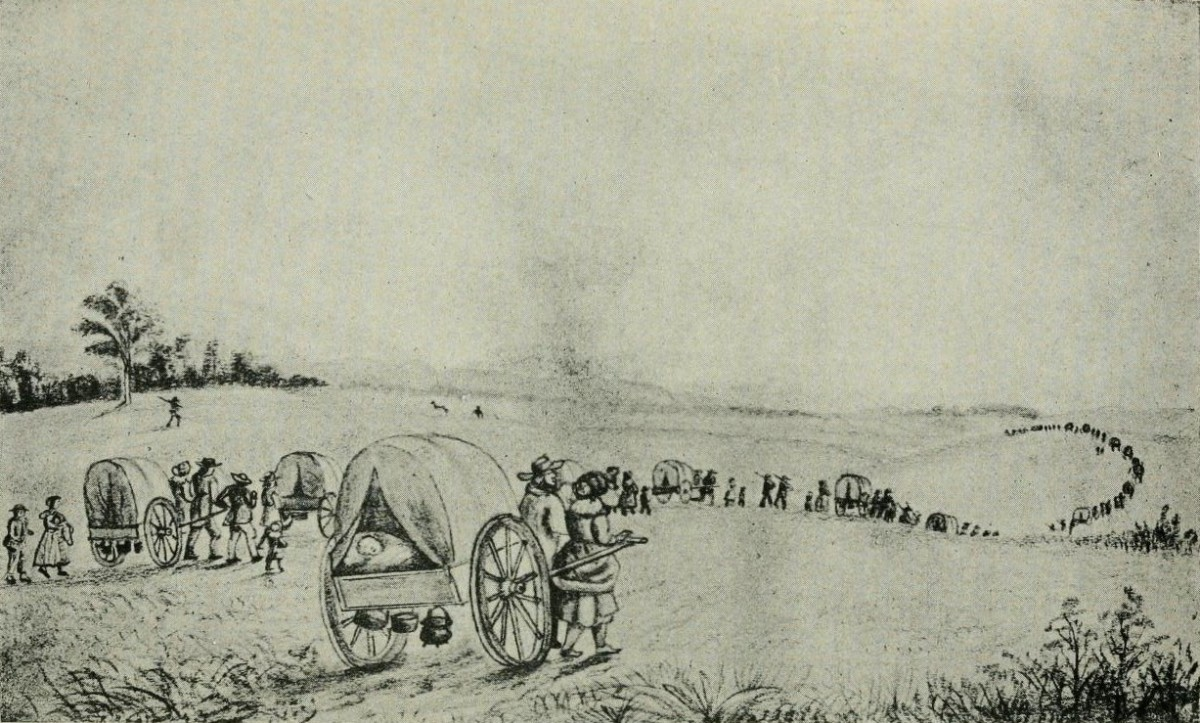
Handcarts crossing Iowa en route to Salt Lake City

During the 1800s, The Church of Jesus Christ and the Latter-Day Saints moved West from Nauvoo, Illinois to escape unrest after reports that members of the Church had fired shots at other local residents. Their journey took many of the members of the Church through Iowa. The Nauvoo brass band earnt money playing for the settlers in Iowa.

Nearly 200 Latter-day Saints established a small community which they named Garden Grove, where they planted crops and built cabins for members of the Church who were unable to continue their journey. Later communities were built at Mount Pisgah and Council Bluffs.

== Stakes ==
Temples & Stakes in and near Iowa with congregations in Iowa. The Nauvoo Illinois Stake Center is located near the Nauvoo Illinois Temple.
Red = Temples
Green = Stake centers

As of September 2026, the following stakes had congregations located in Iowa:

Stake	Organized	Mission	Temple district
Ames Iowa	21 May 1995	Iowa Iowa City	Winter Quarters Nebraska
Cedar Rapids Iowa	29 May 1966	Iowa Iowa City	Nauvoo Illinois
Council Bluffs Iowa	25 Apr 1999	Nebraska Omaha	Winter Quarters Nebraska
Davenport Iowa	9 Apr 1978	Iowa Iowa City	Nauvoo Illinois
Des Moines Iowa	6 Sep 1970	Iowa Iowa City	Winter Quarters Nebraska
Des Moines Iowa Mount Pisgah	20 Nov 2016	Iowa Iowa City	Winter Quarters Nebraska
Iowa City Iowa	10 Jun 2001	Iowa Iowa City	Nauvoo Illinois
Nauvoo Illinois (Note: Stake located outside of Iowa with congregation(s) meeting in Iowa)	18 Feb 1979	Iowa Iowa City	Nauvoo Illinois
Sioux City Iowa	21 Jan 1996	Nebraska Omaha	Winter Quarters Nebraska

== Mission ==
- Iowa Iowa City Mission

== Temples ==
Iowa is located within the Nauvoo Illinois Temple and Winter Quarters Nebraska Temple districts.

In general conference April, 2024, a temple was announced in Des Moines, Iowa.

347. Des Moines Iowa Temple (Site announced); Official website; News & images	
Location: Announced: Size:	Johnston, Iowa, U.S. 7 April 2024 by Russell M. Nelson; 18,850 sq ft (1,751 m^{2}) on a 19.576-acre (7.922 ha) site

== See also ==
- The Church of Jesus Christ of Latter-day Saints membership statistics (United States)
- Religion in Iowa
