= The Church of Jesus Christ of Latter-day Saints in Minnesota =

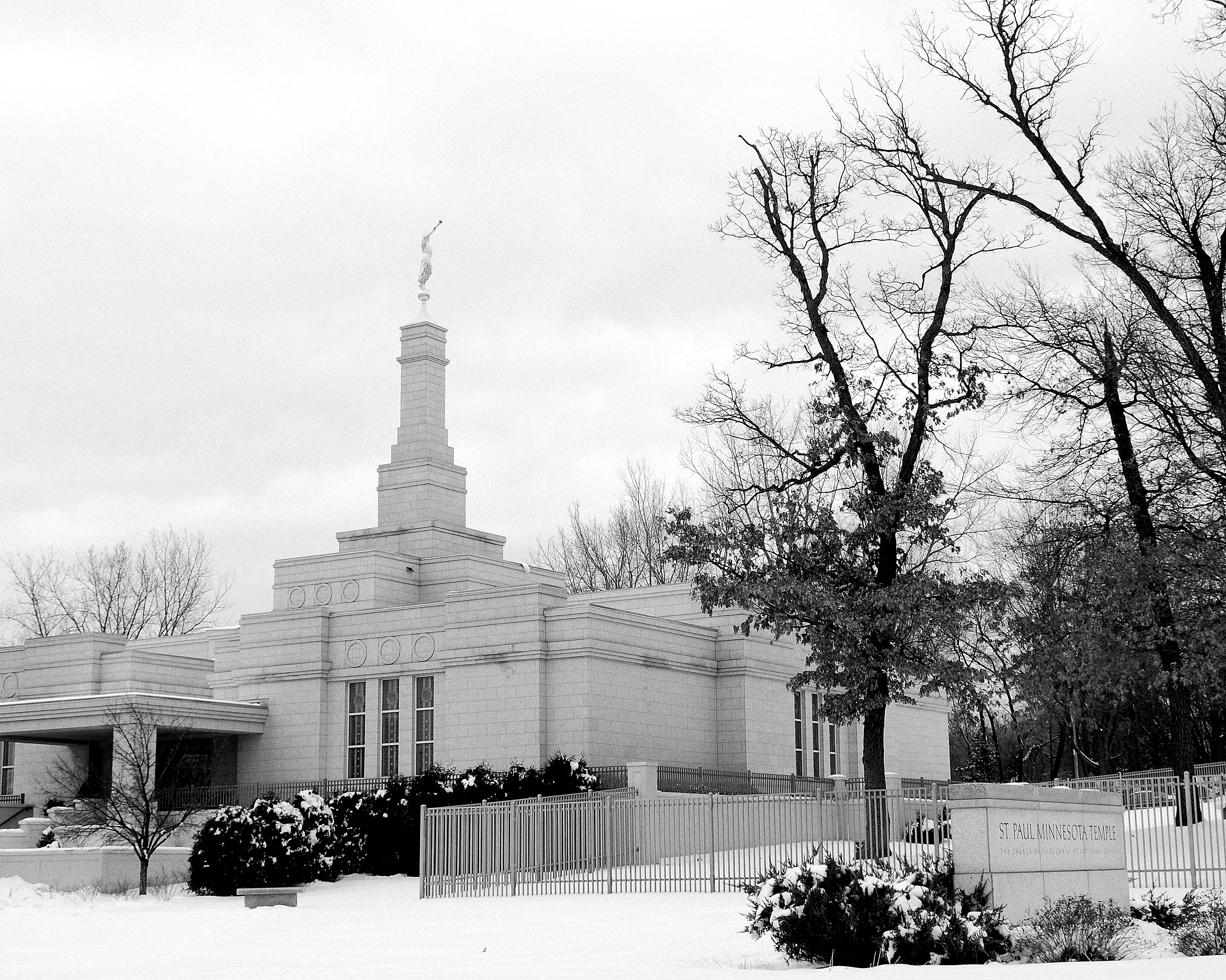
- The St. Paul Minnesota Temple
- Area: US Central
- Members: 34,002 (2025)
- Stakes: 8
- Wards: 56
- Branches: 21
- Total Congregations: 77
- Missions: 1
- Temples: 1
- FamilySearch Centers: 29

The Church of Jesus Christ of Latter-day Saints in Minnesota refers to the Church of Jesus Christ of Latter-day Saints (LDS Church) and its members in Minnesota. The official church membership as a percentage of general population was 0.59% in 2014. According to the 2014 Pew Forum on Religion & Public Life survey, roughly 1% of Minnesotans self-identify themselves most closely with the LDS Church. The LDS Church is the 12th largest denomination in Minnesota.

== History ==
Membership in Minnesota
Year	Membership
1919*	4,000
1983	10,769
1989*	16,000
1999	22,941
2009	30,006
2019	33,276
2025	34,002
*Membership was published as a rounded number. Source: Wendall J. Ashton; Jim M. Wall, Deseret News, various years, Church Almanac State Information: Minnesota

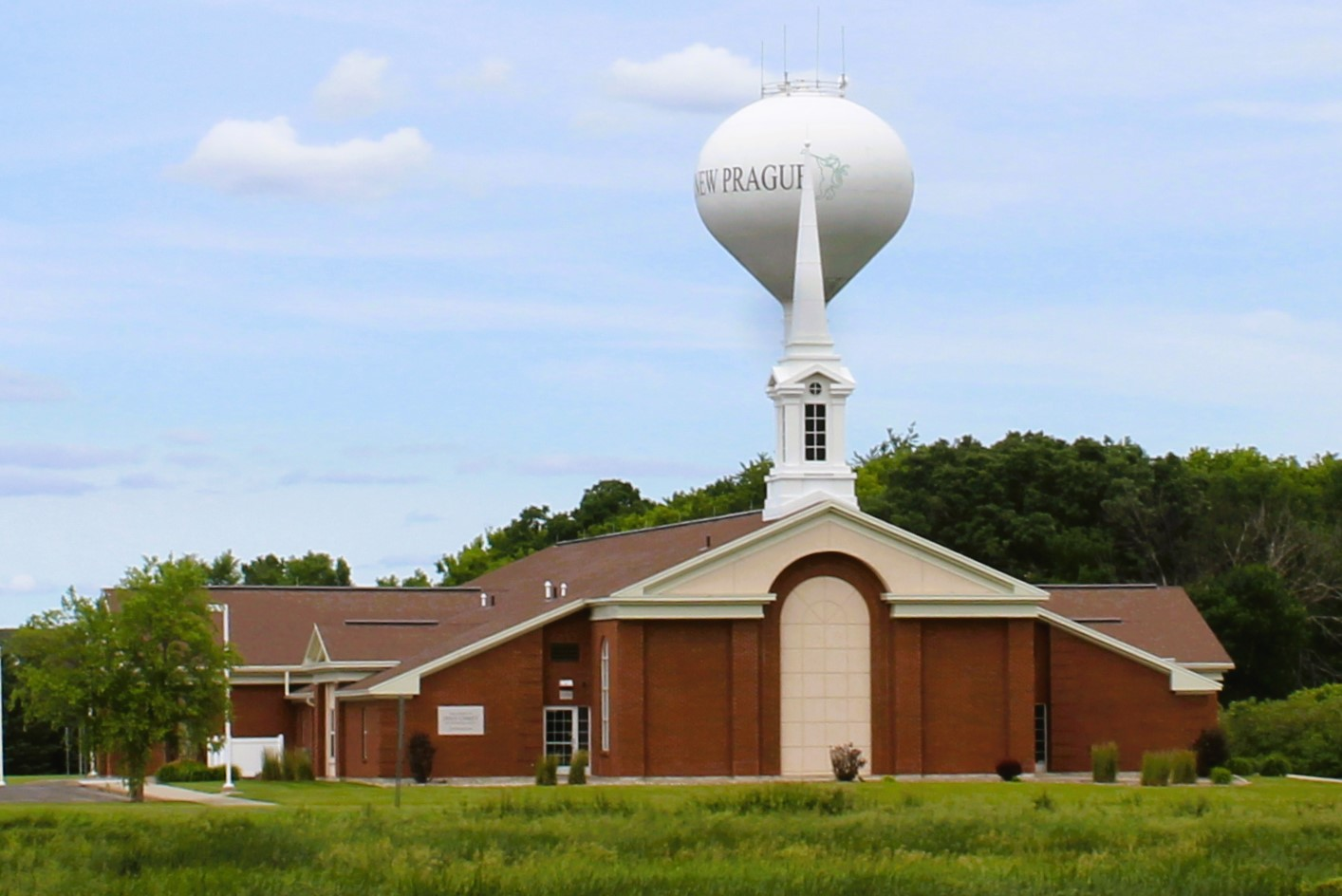
An LDS Meetinghouse in New Prague

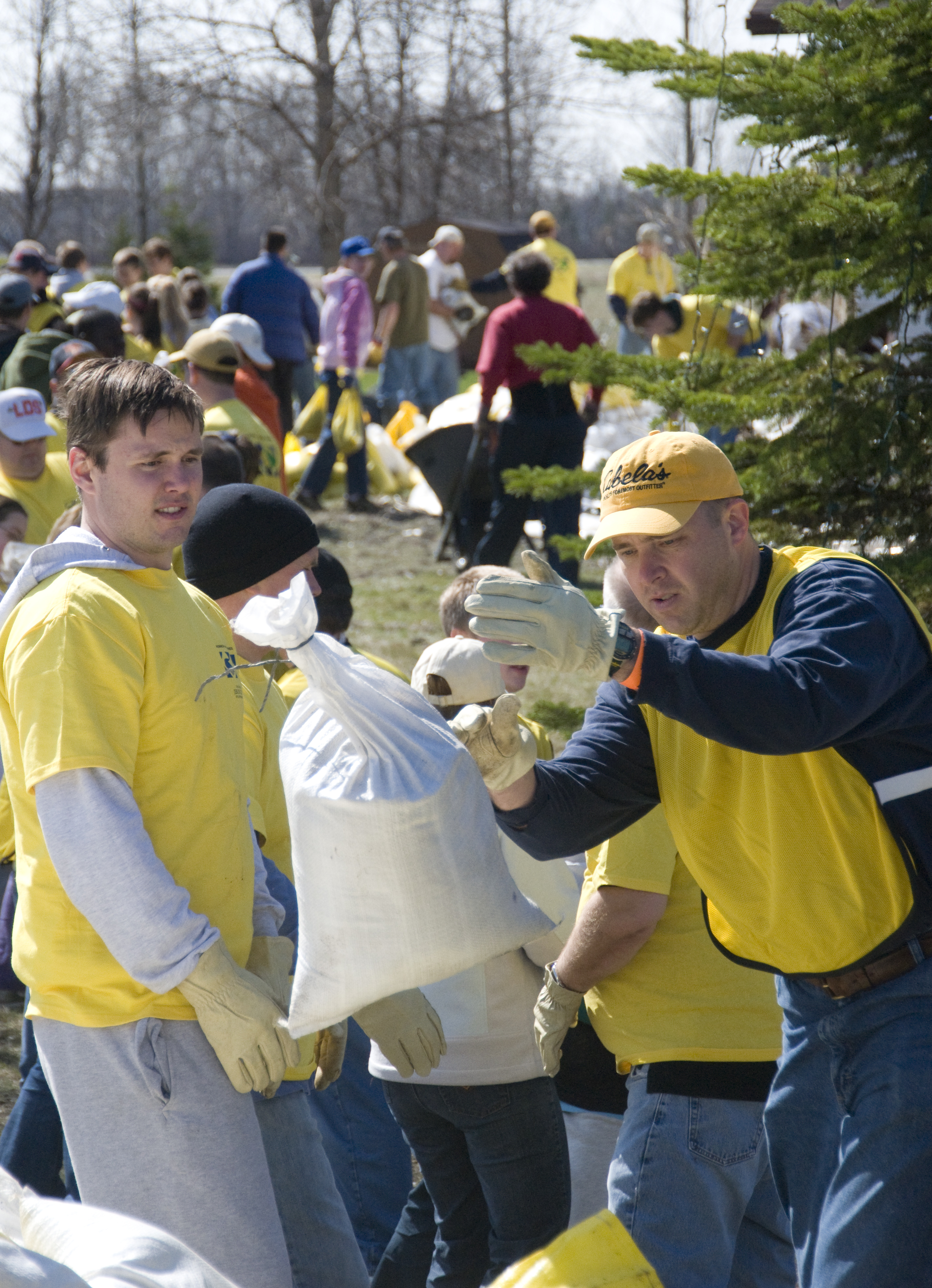
LDS Church volunteers, "Mormon Helping Hands", in Moorhead moving sandbags in response to the 2009 Red River flood.

The first members of the LDS Church entered what is now Minnesota in the early 1840s, while the main body of the church was in Nauvoo, Illinois. At the time, church leadership sent logging camps up to the then Wisconsin Territory to bring lumber down the Mississippi River to help fuel the booming economy in Nauvoo. A branch of the church was established during this time. However, the church's presence in the area quickly disappeared when Joseph Smith, founder of the Latter Day Saint movement, was killed in Carthage, Illinois in 1844. In 1875, the first official LDS Church congregation in Minnesota was organized in Freeborn County.

By 1930, the LDS Church had three mission districts in the state, the North Minnesota, South Minnesota, and Lake districts. Church membership at the time was 967 members. A chapel was built and dedicated by church president Heber J. Grant in 1928.

== Stakes ==
As of July 2026, the following stakes had congregations located in Minnesota:

Stake	Organized	Mission	Temple District
Anoka Minnesota	20 Oct 1985	Minnesota Minneapolis	St. Paul Minnesota
Duluth Minnesota	9 May 1993	Minnesota Minneapolis	St. Paul Minnesota
Fargo North Dakota (Note: Stake located outside of Minnesota with congregation(s) meeting in Minnesota)	7 Aug 1977	North Dakota Bismarck	Bismarck North Dakota
Lakeville Minnesota	28 Apr 1996	Minnesota Minneapolis	St. Paul Minnesota
Minneapolis Minnesota	29 Nov 1960	Minnesota Minneapolis	St. Paul Minnesota
Oakdale Minnesota	4 Feb 2001	Minnesota Minneapolis	St. Paul Minnesota
Rochester Minnesota	30 Apr 1978	Minnesota Minneapolis	St. Paul Minnesota
Sioux Falls South Dakota	18 Nov 1979	Nebraska Omaha	Winter Quarters Nebraska
St Cloud Minnesota	3 May 2009	Minnesota Minneapolis	St. Paul Minnesota
St Paul Minnesota	15 Feb 1976	Minnesota Minneapolis	St. Paul Minnesota

== Mission ==
- Minnesota Minneapolis Mission

== Temples ==
The St. Paul Minnesota Temple was dedicated on January 9, 2000 by church president Gordon B. Hinckley.

69. St. Paul Minnesota Temple; Official website; News & images	
Location: Announced: Groundbreaking: Dedicated: Size: Style:	Oakdale, Minnesota, United States; July 29, 1998 by Gordon B. Hinckley; September 26, 1998 by Hugh W. Pinnock; January 9, 2000 by Gordon B. Hinckley; 10,700 sq ft (990 m^{2}) on a 7.5-acre (3.0 ha) site Classic modern, single-spire design - designed by Ed Kodet, Jr. and Church A&E Services

== See also ==
- The Church of Jesus Christ of Latter-day Saints membership statistics (United States)
- Religion in Minnesota
