= The Church of Jesus Christ of Latter-day Saints in South Dakota =

- Area: US Central
- Members: 12,064 (2025)
- Stakes: 2
- Wards: 14
- Branches: 17
- Total Congregations: 31
- Temples: 1 announced
- FamilySearch Centers: 13

The Church of Jesus Christ of Latter-day Saints in South Dakota refers to the Church of Jesus Christ of Latter-day Saints (LDS Church) and its members in South Dakota. The official church membership as a percentage of general population was 1.27% in 2014. According to the 2014 Pew Forum on Religion & Public Life survey, less than 1% of South Dakotans self-identify themselves most closely with the LDS Church. The LDS Church is the 8th largest denomination in South Dakota.

== History ==
Membership in South Dakota
Year	Members
1983	5,276
1989*	7,400
1999	8,077
2009	9,525
2019	10,610
2025	12,064
*Membership was published as a rounded number. Source: Windall J. Ashton; Jim M. Wall, Deseret News, various years, Church Almanac State Information: South Dakota

The first Anglo-Saxons to settle in what is now South Dakota affiliated themselves with the LDS Church and settled at Fort Vermillion in 1845 to 1846. These settlers, among others, were sent to explore locations that would be suitable for a new home for the LDS Church as they experienced persecutions in Nauvoo, Missouri, and other areas further east.

The number of missionaries from the church sent to the Dakotas doubled during the pandemic.

== Stakes ==
As of July 2026, the following stakes had congregations located in South Dakota:

Stake	Organized	Mission	Temple District
Bismarck North Dakota	22 Sep 1996	North Dakota Bismarck	Bismarck North Dakota
Fargo North Dakota	7 Aug 1977	North Dakota Bismarck	Bismarck North Dakota
Rapid City South Dakota	10 Dec 1972	North Dakota Bismarck	Casper Wyoming
Sioux Falls South Dakota	18 Nov 1979	Nebraska Omaha	Winter Quarters Nebraska
Sioux City Iowa	21 Jan 1996	Nebraska Omaha	Winter Quarters Nebraska

== Missions ==
The former South Dakota Rapid City Mission was renamed the North Dakota Bismarck Mission in 2015.

== Temples ==
As of May 2021, congregations in the Sioux Falls South Dakota and the Sioux City Iowa stakes are in the Winter Quarters Nebraska Temple district. Congregations in the Rapid City South Dakota and the two North Dakota stakes shown above are in the Bismarck North Dakota Temple district.

On April 6, 2025, President Russell M. Nelson announced a temple would be constructed in Rapid City.

379. Rapid City South Dakota Temple (Site announced); Official website; News & images	
Location: Announced: Size:	Rapid City, South Dakota; 6 April 2025 by Russell M. Nelson; 11,800 sq ft (1,100 m^{2}) on a 4.86-acre (1.97 ha) site

== See also ==
- Religion in South Dakota
