= The Church of Jesus Christ of Latter-day Saints in Illinois =

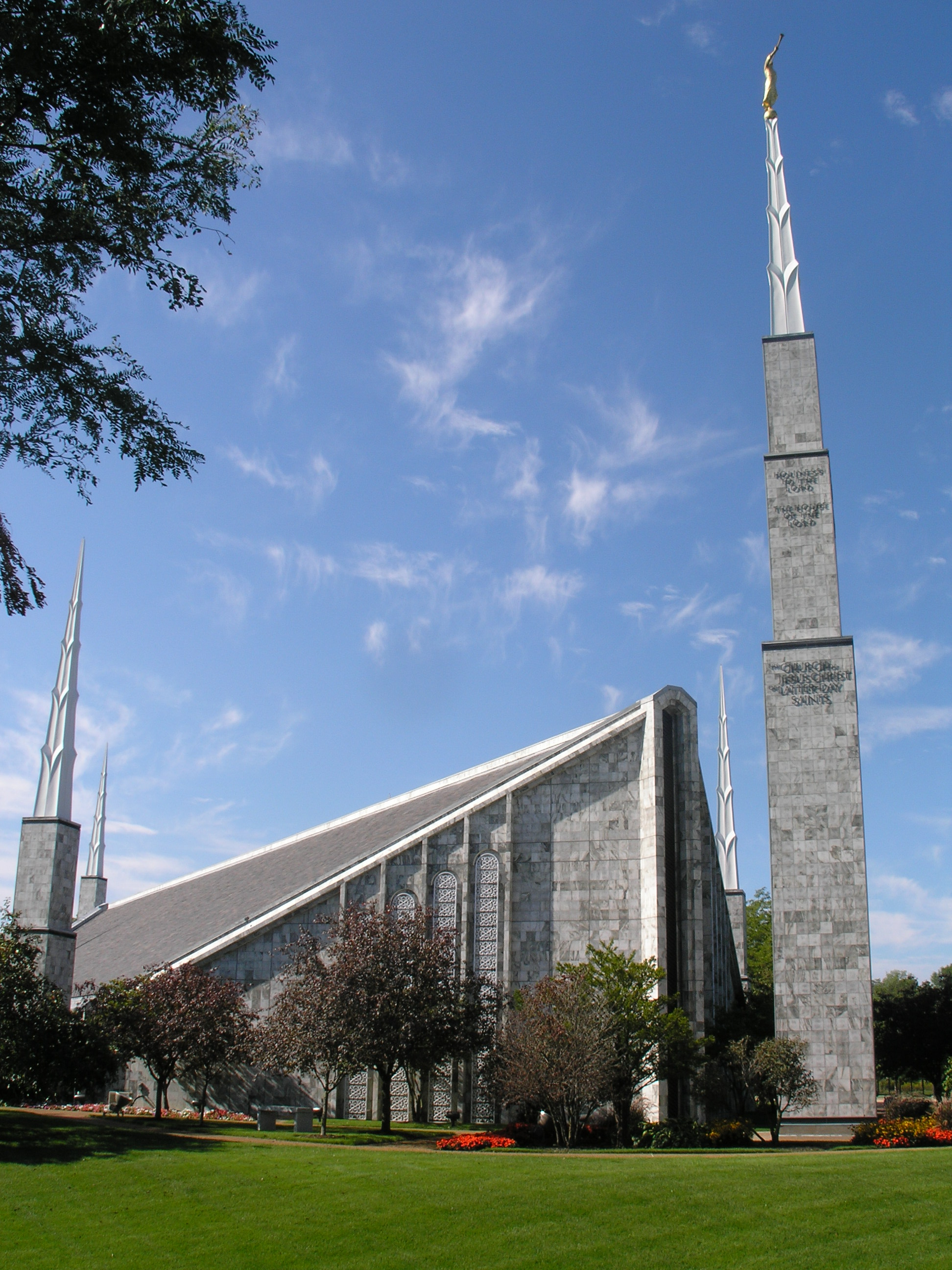
- The Chicago Illinois Temple
- Area: US Central
- Members: 58,832 (2025)
- Stakes: 12
- Wards: 89
- Branches: 30
- Total Congregations: 119
- Missions: 1
- Temples: 2
- FamilySearch Centers: 42

The Church of Jesus Christ of Latter-day Saints in Illinois refers to the Church of Jesus Christ of Latter-day Saints (LDS Church) and its members in Illinois. The official church membership as a percentage of general population was 0.44% in 2014. According to the 2014 Pew Forum on Religion & Public Life survey, less than 1% of Illinoisans self-identify themselves most closely with The Church of Jesus Christ of Latter-day Saints. The LDS Church is the 13th largest denomination in Illinois.

Stakes are located in Buffalo Grove, Champaign, Chicago, Joliet, Naperville, Nauvoo, O'Fallon, Peoria, Rockford, Schaumburg, Springfield and Wilmette.

== History ==
Membership in Illinois
Year	Membership
1974	18,276
1979	22,406
1989*	37,000
1999	46,135
2009	55,460
2019	56,888
2025	58,832
*Membership was published as a rounded number.

In 1839, to escape persecution—including an extermination order given by Missouri governor Lilburn Boggs—the Latter-day Saints drained swamplands on the eastern banks of the Mississippi River and established the city of Nauvoo.

Joseph Smith was killed on June 27, 1844, by an angry mob that stormed Carthage Jail in Carthage, Illinois where Smith was being held.

In 2004, Illinois's lieutenant governor, Pat Quinn, presented church leaders a copy of House Resolution 793, which expressed official regret for the violence that caused the Mormons to leave in 1846.

== Stakes ==
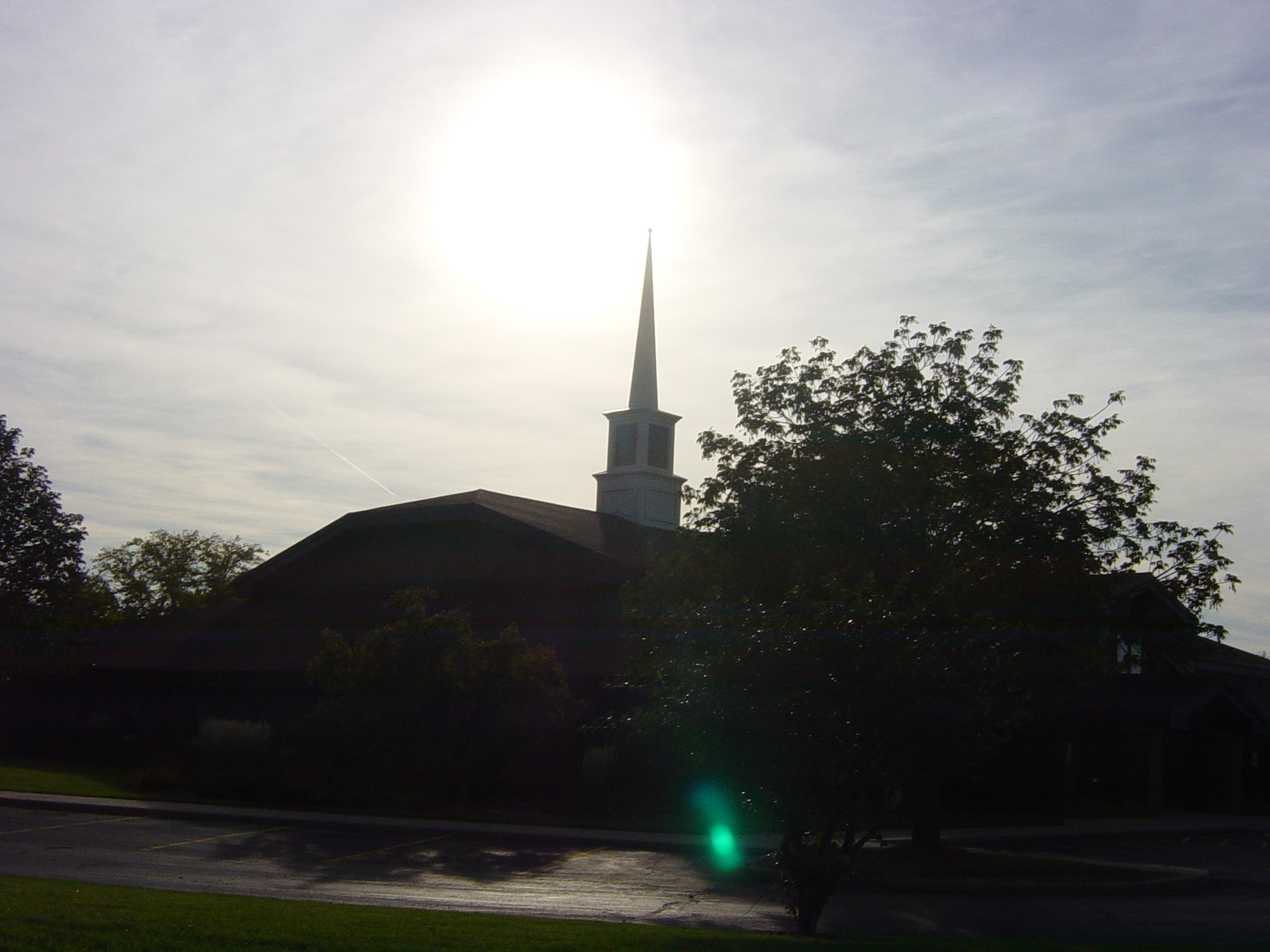
Meetinghouse in Prairie View, Illinois

As of July 2026, the following stakes had congregations located in Illinois:

Stake	Organized	Mission	Temple District
Buffalo Grove Illinois	24 Jan 1988	Illinois Chicago	Chicago Illinois
Cape Girardeau Missouri*	20 Oct 1985	Missouri St Louis	St. Louis Missouri
Champaign Illinois	17 Feb 1963	Missouri St Louis	Indianapolis Indiana
Chicago Illinois	25 Jan 1998	Illinois Chicago	Chicago Illinois
Davenport Iowa*	9 Apr 1978	Iowa Iowa City	Nauvoo Illinois
Evansville Indiana*	19 Oct 1975	Kentucky Louisville	Louisville Kentucky
Joliet Illinois	22 Oct 1995	Illinois Chicago	Chicago Illinois
Hazelwood Missouri*	4 Jun 2017	Missouri St Louis	St. Louis Missouri
Naperville Illinois	3 Feb 1963	Illinois Chicago	Chicago Illinois
Nauvoo Illinois	18 Feb 1979	Iowa Iowa City	Nauvoo Illinois
O'Fallon Illinois	14 Mar 1976	Missouri St Louis	St. Louis Missouri
Paducah Kentucky*	20 Oct 1996	Tennessee Nashville	Nashville Tennessee
Peoria Illinois	3 Aug 1980	Iowa Iowa City	Nauvoo Illinois
Rockford Illinois	11 Apr 1982	Illinois Chicago	Chicago Illinois
Schaumburg Illinois	20 Jan 1980	Illinois Chicago	Chicago Illinois
Springfield Illinois	24 Nov 1996	Missouri St Louis	St. Louis Missouri
St Louis Missouri South*	16 Mar 1980	Missouri St Louis	St. Louis Missouri
Valparaiso Indiana*	2 Jun 1974	Indiana Fort Wayne	Chicago Illinois
Wilmette Illinois	29 Nov 1936	Illinois Chicago	Chicago Illinois

- *Stakes outside of state with congregations in Illinois

== Missions ==
- Illinois Chicago Mission (1983–present)

=== Former missions ===
- Northern States Mission (1889–1973)
- Illinois Mission (1973–1974)
- Illinois Chicago Mission (1974–1980)
- Illinois Chicago North Mission (1980–1983)
- Illinois Nauvoo Mission

== Temples ==
Temples in Illinois
- = Operating
- = Under construction
- = Announced
- = Closed for renovation

. Nauvoo Temple (Destroyed); News & images	
Location: Announced: Groundbreaking: Dedicated: Size: Style: Notes:	Nauvoo, Illinois, United States; August 1840; February 18, 1841; May 1, 1846 by Orson Hyde; 54,000 sq ft (5,000 m^{2}); Greek revival - designed by William Weeks; Some sources claim a private dedication on April 30, 1846 by Brigham Young. Abandoned in 1846, destroyed by fire on November 19, 1848, rebuilt in 2002 (see 113).
35. Chicago Illinois Temple; Official website; News & images	
Location: Announced: Groundbreaking: Dedicated: Rededicated: Size: Style: Notes:	Glenview, Illinois, United States; April 1, 1981 by Spencer W. Kimball; August 13, 1983 by Gordon B. Hinckley; August 9, 1985 by Gordon B. Hinckley; October 8, 1989 by Gordon B. Hinckley; 37,062 sq ft (3,443.2 m^{2}) on a 13-acre (5.3 ha) site Modern adaptation of six-spire design - designed by Wight & Co and Church A&E Services; Rededication in 1989 was for the addition only
113. Nauvoo Illinois Temple; Official website; News & images	
Location: Announced: Groundbreaking: Dedicated: Size: Style: Notes:	Nauvoo, Illinois, U.S. April 4, 1999 by Gordon B. Hinckley; October 24, 1999 by Gordon B. Hinckley; June 27, 2002 by Gordon B. Hinckley; 54,000 sq ft (5,000 m^{2}) on a 3.3-acre (1.3 ha) site Greek revival - designed by FFKR Architecture based on design by William Weeks; Built on the site of the Nauvoo Temple and dedicated on the 158th anniversary of the death of Joseph Smith, the exterior is an almost exact reconstruction of the original temple. Primary difference is weather-vane has been replaced with a statue of the angel Moroni. However, the interior has 4 progressive ordinance rooms with murals like those in the early Utah temples leading to the celestial room and 6 sealing rooms.

== See also ==
- The Church of Jesus Christ of Latter-day Saints membership statistics (United States)
- Illinois: Religion
- Nauvoo, Illinois
- Carthage Jail
