= United States membership statistics (LDS Church) =

LDS Church membership in the United States

The Church of Jesus Christ of Latter-day Saints in the United States
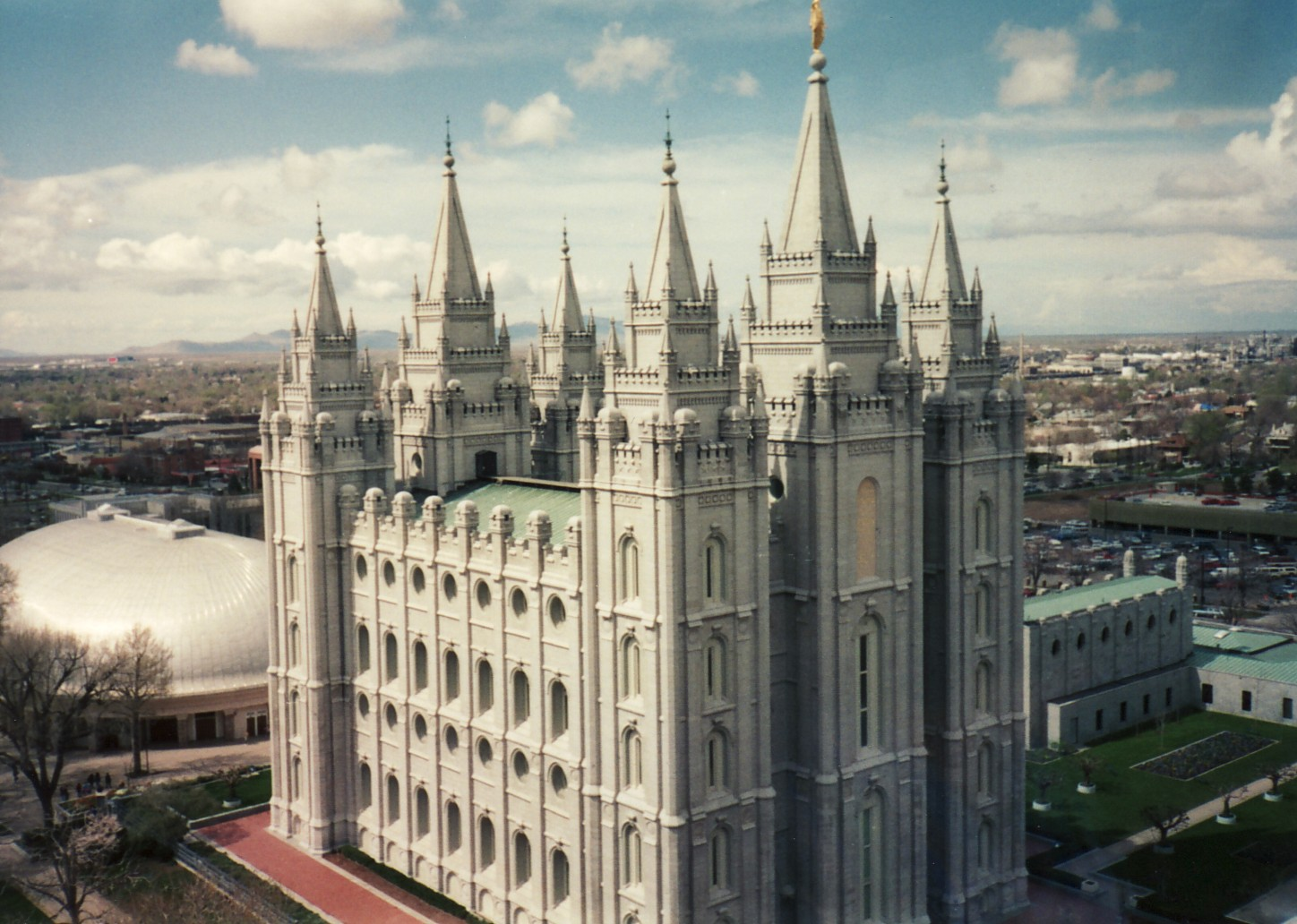
- The Salt Lake Temple
- Members: 6,929,770 (2025)
- Stakes: 1,742
- Districts: 13
- Wards: 12,821
- Branches: 1,820
- Total Congregations: 14,641
- Missions: 120
- Temples: 101 operating; 24 under construction; 33 announced; 158 total
- FamilySearch Centers: 1,598

Recent Membership History
Year	Members
2012	6,321,416 (2.01% of US total)
2013	6,398,889 (2.03% of US total)
2014	6,466,267 (2.03% of US total)
2015	6,531,656 (2.04% of US total)
2016	6,592,195 (2.04% of US total)
2017	6,641,886 (2.04% of US total)
2018	6,681,829 (2.04% of US total)
2019	6,721,032 (2.05% of US total)
*2020	6,742,000 (2.03% of US total)
2021	6,763,019 (2.04% of US total)
2022	6,804,028 (2.04% of US total)
2023	6,868,793 (2.05% of US total)
2024	6,929,956 (2.04% of US total)
2025	6,929,770 (2.03% of US total)
Source: https://newsroom.churchofjesuschrist.org/facts-and-statistics/country/united-states (*2020 is an estimate since official numbers weren't released.)

This page shows the membership statistics of the Church of Jesus Christ of Latter-day Saints (LDS Church) within the United States.

- Official LDS Membership - Membership count on record provided by the LDS Church. These records include adults and children, and also include both active and less active members.
- From religious surveys - General religious surveys conducted within the United States. These surveyed U.S. adults about their religious beliefs.

== Membership defined ==
Membership reported by the Church of Jesus Christ of Latter-day Saints on December 31, 2025, was used to determine the number of members in each state. The church defines membership as:

- "Those who have been baptized and confirmed."
- "Those under age nine who have been blessed but not baptized."
- "Those who are not accountable because of intellectual disabilities, regardless of age."
- "Unblessed children under 8 when both of the following apply:
  - "At least one parent or one grandparent is a member of the Church."
  - "Both parents give permission for a record to be created. (If only one parent has legal custody of the child, the permission of that parent is sufficient.)"

The United States Census Bureau 2025 population estimates was used as the basis for the general population. Each state link gives a brief history and additional membership information for that state.

LDS membership as percentage of population by US states (2021)

LDS membership in absolute numbers, by US states (2021)

=== Table ===
==== Congregational ====
State	Area	Temples				Missions	Districts	Stakes	Congregations			FSC
State	Area	O	U	A	T	Missions	Districts	Stakes	Wards	Branches	Total	FSC
Alabama	US Southeast	1	0	1	2	1	0	8	47	28	75	44
Alaska	US West	1	2	0	3	1	0	9	59	23	82	15
Arizona	US Southwest	6	0	3	9	6	3	120	806	86	892	74
Arkansas	US Southeast	1	0	0	1	2	0	8	55	24	79	25
California	US West	8	2	2	12	16	0	145	946	139	1,085	228
Colorado	US Central	3	0	1	4	4	0	36	279	36	315	64
Connecticut	US Northeast	1	0	0	1	0	0	3	25	6	31	10
Delaware	US Northeast	0	0	0	0	0	0	2	9	1	10	3
Florida	US Southeast	3	2	0	5	5	0	33	227	60	287	84
Georgia	US Southeast	1	0	0	1	2	0	19	135	28	163	44
Hawaii	US West	2	0	2	4	2	0	17	131	15	146	26
Idaho	US Central	6	3	2	11	3	0	147	1,275	48	1,323	70
Illinois	US Central	2	0	0	2	1	0	12	90	31	121	42
Indiana	US Northeast	1	0	0	1	1	0	13	80	22	102	40
Iowa	US Central	0	0	1	1	1	0	8	44	25	69	30
Kansas	US Central	0	1	0	1	1	0	8	60	15	75	29
Kentucky	US Southeast	1	0	0	1	1	0	8	51	32	83	28
Louisiana	US Southeast	1	0	0	1	1	0	7	32	20	52	15
Maine	US Northeast	0	0	1	1	0	0	3	17	9	26	10
Maryland	US Northeast	1	0	0	1	2	0	10	65	19	84	14
Massachusetts	US Northeast	1	0	0	1	1	0	7	42	14	56	18
Michigan	US Northeast	1	1	0	2	2	1	10	61	39	100	43
Minnesota	US Central	1	0	0	1	1	0	8	56	21	77	29
Mississippi	US Southeast	0	0	0	0	0	0	4	30	19	49	20
Missouri	US Central	2	0	1	3	2	0	22	153	28	181	51
Montana	US Central	2	0	1	3	2	0	14	97	43	140	50
Nebraska	US Central	1	0	0	1	1	0	5	42	15	57	18
Nevada	US Southwest	3	1	0	4	4	0	43	304	35	339	34
New Hampshire	US Northeast	0	0	0	0	1	0	3	14	4	18	6
New Jersey	US Northeast	0	0	1	1	1	0	6	42	19	61	20
New Mexico	US Southwest	2	0	0	2	2	0	14	104	33	137	31
New York	US Northeast	2	0	0	2	2	1	17	96	48	144	65
North Carolina	US Southeast	1	0	1	2	2	0	20	145	27	172	51
North Dakota	US Central	1	0	0	1	1	0	3	20	7	27	7
Ohio	US Northeast	1	1	1	3	2	0	15	99	33	132	46
Oklahoma	US Southwest	1	0	1	2	1	0	13	80	18	98	30
Oregon	US West	2	1	0	3	3	0	34	233	45	278	76
Pennsylvania	US Northeast	2	0	1	3	2	0	13	75	30	105	46
Rhode Island	US Northeast	0	0	0	0	0	0	1	8	1	9	1
South Carolina	US Southeast	1	0	1	2	2	0	11	71	18	89	23
South Dakota	US Central	0	0	1	1	0	0	2	14	17	31	13
Tennessee	US Southeast	2	1	0	3	2	0	14	93	28	121	35
Texas	US Southwest	5	2	3	10	12	1	83	633	123	756	138
Utah	Utah	24	4	4	32	13	7	647	5,046	319	5,365	170
Vermont	US Northeast	0	0	0	0	0	0	1	7	2	9	8
Virginia	US Northeast	1	1	2	4	2	0	25	177	35	212	46
Washington	US West	4	1	2	7	7	0	62	425	48	473	97
Washington, D.C.	US Northeast	0	0	0	0	0	0	0	4	0	4	1
West Virginia	US Northeast	0	0	0	0	1	0	4	25	14	39	14
Wisconsin	US Central	0	0	1	1	1	0	6	49	20	69	29
Wyoming	US Central	2	1	0	3	0	0	19	143	30	173	46

==== Members and growth ====
State	Area	Members	Population	%LDS	2015	Change	Growth (%)	% of Total Growth	Pew	ARDA
Alabama	US Southeast	41,252	5,193,088	0.79%	36,874	4,378	11.87%	0.94%	1%	10th
Alaska	US West	33,574	737,270	4.55%	33,649	−75	-0.22%	-0.02%	5%	2nd
Arizona	US Southwest	442,094	7,623,818	5.8%	418,959	23,135	5.52%	4.99%	5%	2nd
Arkansas	US Southeast	38,035	3,114,791	1.22%	30,447	7,588	24.92%	1.64%	1%	9th
California	US West	725,648	39,355,309	1.84%	773,762	−48,114	-6.22%	-10.38%	1%	2nd
Colorado	US Central	148,945	6,012,561	2.48%	151,580	−2,635	-1.74%	-0.57%	2%	2nd
Connecticut	US Northeast	16,442	3,688,496	0.45%	15,752	690	4.38%	0.15%	1%	10th
Delaware	US Northeast	6,018	1,059,952	0.57%	5,239	779	14.87%	0.17%	<1%	11th
Florida	US Southeast	178,456	23,462,518	0.76%	152,217	26,239	17.24%	5.66%	1%	8th
Georgia	US Southeast	92,581	11,302,748	0.82%	83,628	8,953	10.71%	1.93%	1%	8th
Hawaii	US West	75,827	1,432,820	5.29%	73,740	2,087	2.83%	0.45%	3%	2nd
Idaho	US Central	482,905	2,029,733	23.79%	437,106	45,799	10.48%	9.88%	19%	1st
Illinois	US Central	58,832	12,719,141	0.46%	56,920	1,912	3.36%	0.41%	<1%	13th
Indiana	US Northeast	48,878	6,973,333	0.7%	44,071	4,807	10.91%	1.04%	1%	13th
Iowa	US Central	29,981	3,238,387	0.93%	27,675	2,306	8.33%	0.5%	<1%	13th
Kansas	US Central	39,838	2,977,220	1.34%	37,099	2,739	7.38%	0.59%	1%	10th
Kentucky	US Southeast	39,792	4,606,864	0.86%	34,491	5,301	15.37%	1.14%	<1%	8th
Louisiana	US Southeast	29,913	4,618,189	0.65%	29,772	141	0.47%	0.03%	<1%	6th
Maine	US Northeast	11,275	1,414,874	0.8%	10,966	309	2.82%	0.07%	2%	6th
Maryland	US Northeast	44,671	6,265,347	0.71%	43,387	1,284	2.96%	0.28%	1%	8th
Massachusetts	US Northeast	29,541	7,154,084	0.41%	27,055	2,486	9.19%	0.54%	1%	11th
Michigan	US Northeast	47,105	10,127,884	0.47%	44,206	2,899	6.56%	0.63%	<1%	13th
Minnesota	US Central	34,002	5,830,405	0.58%	32,321	1,681	5.2%	0.36%	1%	12th
Mississippi	US Southeast	22,000	2,954,160	0.74%	21,770	230	1.06%	0.05%	1%	10th
Missouri	US Central	84,311	6,270,541	1.34%	69,454	14,857	21.39%	3.2%	1%	8th
Montana	US Central	52,050	1,144,694	4.55%	49,597	2,453	4.95%	0.53%	4%	2nd
Nebraska	US Central	26,199	2,018,006	1.3%	24,855	1,344	5.41%	0.29%	1%	6th
Nevada	US Southwest	181,842	3,282,188	5.54%	182,125	−283	-0.16%	-0.06%	4%	2nd
New Hampshire	US Northeast	8,575	1,415,342	0.61%	8,246	329	3.99%	0.07%	1%	6th
New Jersey	US Northeast	36,632	9,548,215	0.38%	33,352	3,280	9.83%	0.71%	<1%	15th
New Mexico	US Southwest	68,699	2,125,498	3.23%	69,896	−1,197	-1.71%	-0.26%	1%	3rd
New York	US Northeast	92,133	20,002,427	0.46%	81,132	11,001	13.56%	2.37%	<1%	13th
North Carolina	US Southeast	98,483	11,197,968	0.88%	83,829	14,654	17.48%	3.16%	1%	8th
North Dakota	US Central	11,807	799,358	1.48%	11,195	612	5.47%	0.13%	<1%	7th
Ohio	US Northeast	65,991	11,900,510	0.55%	60,971	5,020	8.23%	1.08%	1%	14th
Oklahoma	US Southwest	53,890	4,123,288	1.31%	47,044	6,846	14.55%	1.48%	1%	8th
Oregon	US West	148,062	4,273,586	3.46%	153,633	−5,571	-3.63%	-1.2%	3%	2nd
Pennsylvania	US Northeast	54,354	13,059,432	0.42%	51,336	3,018	5.88%	0.65%	<1%	13th
Rhode Island	US Northeast	5,025	1,114,521	0.45%	4,034	991	24.57%	0.21%	<1%	8th
South Carolina	US Southeast	46,753	5,570,274	0.84%	39,894	6,859	17.19%	1.48%	<1%	11th
South Dakota	US Central	12,064	935,094	1.29%	10,422	1,642	15.76%	0.35%	<1%	8th
Tennessee	US Southeast	61,991	7,315,076	0.85%	49,576	12,415	25.04%	2.68%	1%	10th
Texas	US Southwest	395,964	31,709,821	1.25%	341,022	54,942	16.11%	11.85%	1%	6th
Utah	Utah	2,206,370	3,538,904	62.35%	2,040,178	166,192	8.15%	35.84%	55%	1st
Vermont	US Northeast	4,685	644,663	0.73%	4,596	89	1.94%	0.02%	<1%	7th
Virginia	US Northeast	99,973	8,880,107	1.13%	94,528	5,445	5.76%	1.17%	2%	7th
Washington	US West	278,576	8,001,020	3.48%	284,631	−6,055	-2.13%	-1.31%	3%	2nd
Washington, D.C.	US Northeast	3,648	693,645	0.53%	2,624	1,024	39.02%	0.22%	1%	39th
West Virginia	US Northeast	17,663	1,766,147	1%	16,959	704	4.15%	0.15%	2%	9th
Wisconsin	US Central	28,950	5,972,787	0.48%	26,161	2,789	10.66%	0.6%	<1%	10th
Wyoming	US Central	66,665	588,753	11.32%	67,680	−1,015	-1.5%	-0.22%	9%	1st

=== Territories ===
Country	Area	Temples				Missions	Districts	Stakes	Congregations			FSC
Country	Area	O	U	A	T	Missions	Districts	Stakes	Wards	Branches	Total	FSC
American Samoa	Pacific	0	1	0	1	0	0	5	38	6	44	6
Guam	Asia North	1	0	0	1	1	0	1	4	0	4	3
Northern Mariana Islands	Asia North	0	0	0	0	0	0	0	1	0	1	1
Puerto Rico	Caribbean	1	0	0	1	1	1	5	27	11	38	13
United States Virgin Islands	Caribbean	0	0	0	0	0	0	0	0	2	2	0
Totals		2	1	0	3	2	1	11	70	19	89	23

Country	Area	Members	Population	%LDS	2015	Change	Growth (%)	% of Total Growth
American Samoa	Pacific	17,646	49,710	35.498%	16,149	1,497	9.27%	0.066%
Guam	Asia North	2,768	153,836	1.799%	2,295	473	20.61%	0.021%
Northern Mariana Islands	Asia North	938	47,329	1.982%	793	145	18.28%	0.006%
Puerto Rico	Caribbean	26,947	3,203,295	0.841%	23,191	3,756	16.2%	0.167%
United States Virgin Islands	Caribbean	704	87,146	0.808%	599	105	17.53%	0.005%
Totals		49,003	3,541,316	1.38%	43,027	5,976	13.89%	0.265%

== From religious surveys ==
=== 2001 American Religious Identification Survey ===
Percentage of US adult population by state claiming membership in the LDS church in the 2001 ARIS survey. Click image for map legend.

The 2001 American Religious Identification Survey (ARIS) was based on a random digit-dialed telephone survey of 50,281 American adults in the continental U.S.

=== 2007 Pew Forum on Religion & Public Life ===
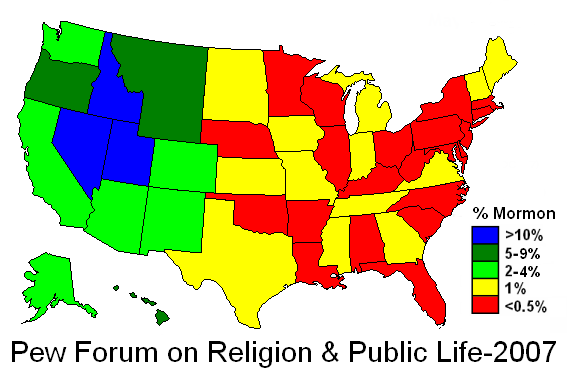
Percentage of US adult population, by state, claiming Mormon as religious preference in the 2007 survey by the Pew Forum on Religion & Public Life.

The Pew Forum on Religion & Public Life published a survey of 35,556 adults living in the United States that was conducted in 2007. The 2007 survey, conducted by Princeton Survey Research Associates International (PSRAI), found 1.7% of the U.S. adult population self identified themselves as Mormon. The table below lists a few significant findings, from the survey, about Mormons. Note: some less populated states were combined in this survey. These include: Montana-Wyoming, D.C.-Maryland, North & South Dakota, New Hampshire-Vermont, and Connecticut-Rhode Island. The racial and ethnic composition of the U.S. membership is predominantly white with a lower percentage of blacks when compared to the U.S. average.

Demographic	Mormons (U.S.)	U.S. Avg.
Married	71 %	54 %
Divorced or separated	9 %	12 %
3 or more children at home	21 %	9 %
Weekly (or more) Attendance at Religious Services	76 %	39 %

Race, Ethnicity	Mormons (U.S.)	U.S. Avg.
White, non-Hisp.	86 %	71 %
Black, non-Hisp.	3 %	11 %
Other non-Hisp.	5 %	6 %
Hispanic	7 %	12 %

== See also ==
- Membership history of the Church of Jesus Christ of Latter-day Saints
- Canada membership statistics (LDS Church)
