= The Church of Jesus Christ of Latter-day Saints in Wisconsin =

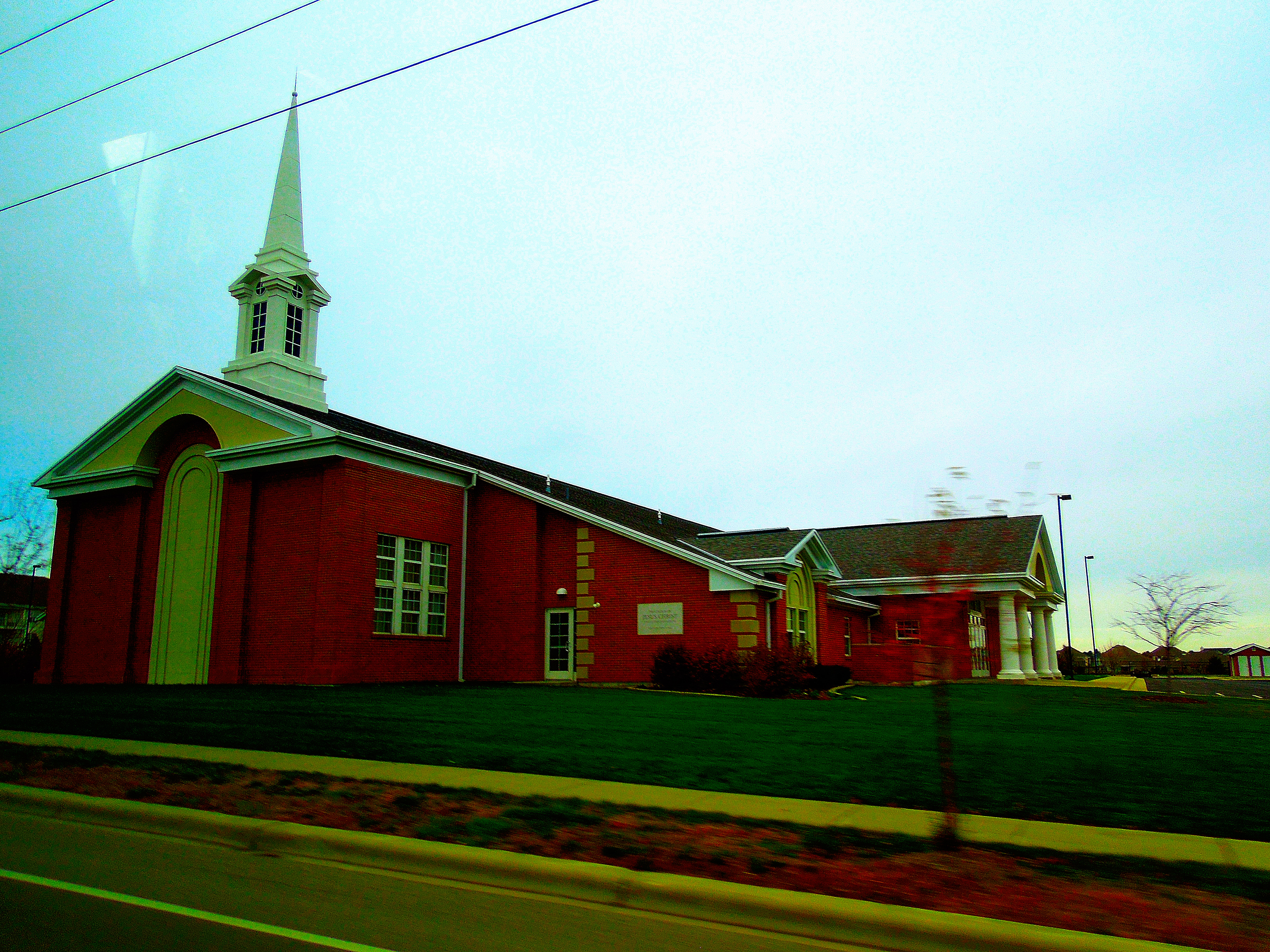
- A meetinghouse and Stake Center in Madison, Wisconsin
- Area: US Central
- Members: 28,950 (2025)
- Stakes: 6
- Wards: 49
- Branches: 20
- Total Congregations: 69
- Missions: 1
- Temples: 1 announced
- FamilySearch Centers: 29

The Church of Jesus Christ of Latter-day Saints in Wisconsin refers to the Church of Jesus Christ of Latter-day Saints (LDS Church) and its members in Wisconsin. The official church membership as a percentage of general population was 0.44% in 2014. According to the 2014 Pew Forum on Religion & Public Life survey, less than 1% of Wisconsinites self-identify themselves most closely with the LDS Church. The LDS Church is the 10th largest denomination in Wisconsin.

== History ==
Membership in Wisconsin
Year	Membership
1979	7,695
1989*	12,000
1999	19,282
2009	24,019
2019	27,125
2025	28,950
*Membership was published as an estimate. Source: Wendall J. Ashton; Jim M. Wall, Deseret News, various years, Church Almanac State Information: Wisconsin

After the LDS Church left nearby Nauvoo, Illinois in 1844 for the West, missionary efforts resumed in the state in 1878, with a congregation formed in 1899, and a chapel built in 1907.

James Strang, a man who had been baptized four months before the martyrdom of Joseph Smith, had stepped forward to become the new leader of the LDS Church, but was subsequently excommunicated and later established a new church, the Church of Jesus Christ of Latter Day Saints (Strangite), with followers who gathered to Voree, Wisconsin.

On April 16, 1899, the Milwaukee Branch, the first formal organization of the LDS Church in the city, was founded in Wisconsin.

In 2012, the LDS Church presence in Wisconsin was 24,386 members, about 0.4 percent of the state population.

== Stakes ==
Temples & Stakes in and near Wisconsin that have congregations in Wisconsin. Oakdale Stake Center is located next to the St. Paul Minnesota Temple. The Chicago Illinois Temple is located off the map.
Red = Temples
Green = Stake Centers

As of July 2026, the following stakes ware located in Wisconsin:

Stake	Organized	Mission	Temple District
Appleton Wisconsin	11 May 1986	Wisconsin Milwaukee	Chicago Illinois
Cedar Rapids Iowa*	29 May 1966	Iowa Iowa City	Nauvoo Illinois
Duluth Minnesota*	9 May 1993	Minnesota Minneapolis	St. Paul Minnesota
Green Bay Wisconsin	23 Mar 1997	Wisconsin Milwaukee	Chicago Illinois
Madison Wisconsin	24 Aug 1973	Wisconsin Milwaukee	Chicago Illinois
Milwaukee Wisconsin North	14 Apr 2002	Wisconsin Milwaukee	Chicago Illinois
Milwaukee Wisconsin South	3 Feb 1963	Wisconsin Milwaukee	Chicago Illinois
Oakdale Minnesota*	4 Feb 2001	Minnesota Minneapolis	St. Paul Minnesota
Rochester Minnesota*	3 Feb 1963	Minnesota Minneapolis	St. Paul Minnesota
Wausau Wisconsin	3 Nov 1996	Wisconsin Milwaukee	St. Paul Minnesota

- *Stakes outside of state with congregations in Wisconsin

== Mission ==
- Wisconsin Milwaukee Mission

== Temples ==
Wisconsin is located within the Chicago Illinois and St. Paul Minnesota temple districts.

On 6 October 2024, church president Russell M Nelson announced the Milwaukee Wisconsin Temple, the first in the state.

365. Milwaukee Wisconsin Temple (Announced); Official website; News & images	
Location: Announced:	Milwaukee, Wisconsin, United States; 6 October 2024 by Russell M. Nelson

== See also ==
- The Church of Jesus Christ of Latter-day Saints membership statistics (United States)
- Religion in Wisconsin
