= The Church of Jesus Christ of Latter-day Saints in New Jersey =

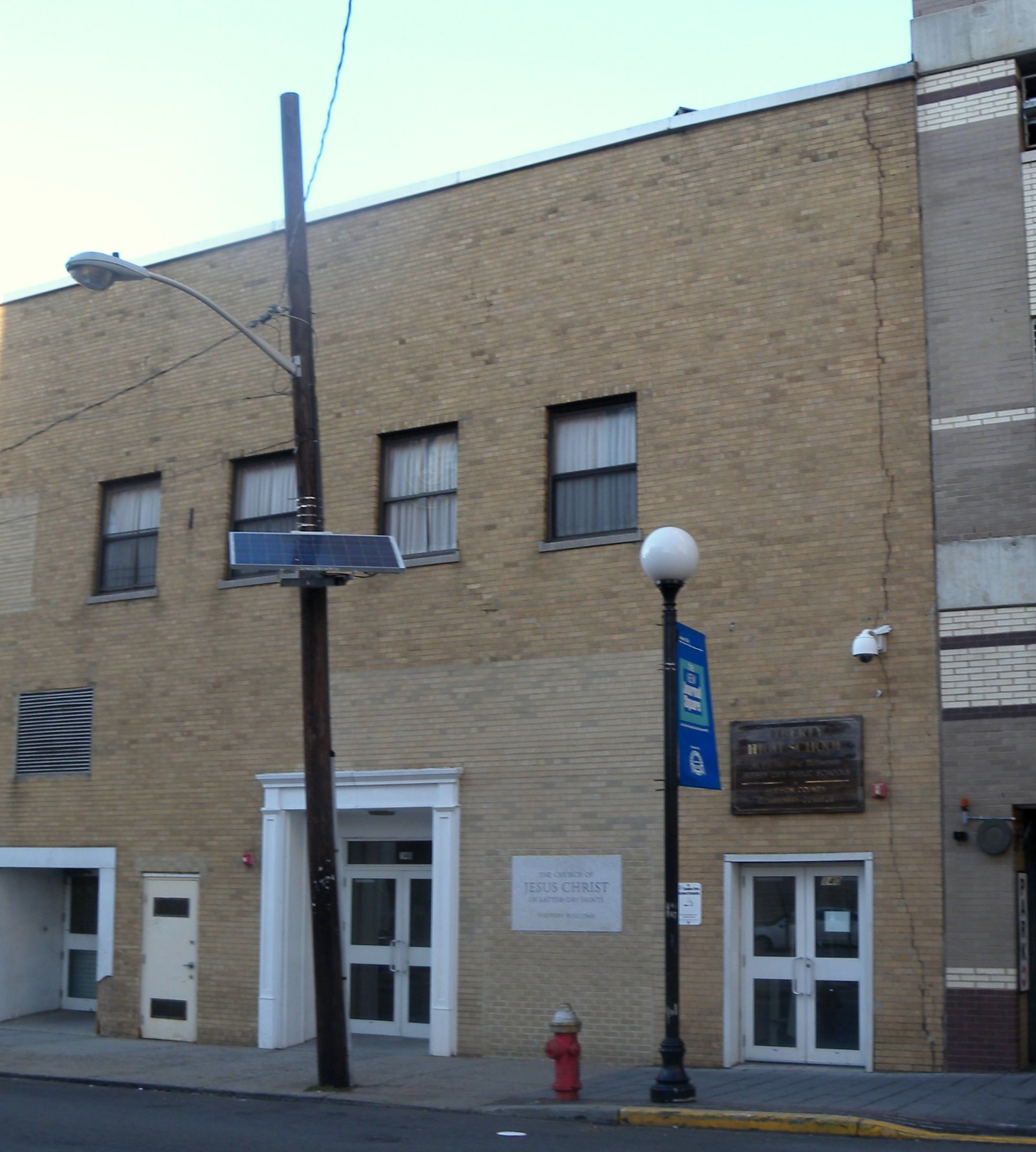
- A meetinghouse of The Church of Jesus Christ of Latter-day Saints, formerly Liberty High School, in Jersey City, New Jersey.
- Area: US Northeast
- Members: 36,632 (2025)
- Stakes: 6
- Wards: 42
- Branches: 19
- Total Congregations: 61
- Missions: 1
- Temples: 1 announced
- FamilySearch Centers: 20

The Church of Jesus Christ of Latter-day Saints in New Jersey refers to the Church of Jesus Christ of Latter-day Saints (LDS Church) and its members in New Jersey.

Official church membership as a percentage of general population was 0.37% in 2014, making New Jersey the lowest percentage of LDS members as a percentage of the population within the United States. According to the 2014 Pew Forum on Religion & Public Life survey, less than 1% of New Jersey residents self-identify themselves most closely with the LDS Church.

== History ==
Membership in New Jersey
Year	Membership
1940*	500
1950*	800
1959*	2,400
1970	6,600
1979	7,850
1989*	15,000
1999	25,949
2009	30,896
2019	34,173
2025	36,632
*Membership was published as a rounded number. Source: Wendall J. Ashton; Jim M. Wall, Deseret News, various years, Church Almanac State Information: New Jersey

Orson Pratt and Lyman E. Johnson, future leaders of LDS Church, preached as missionaries in New Jersey in 1832. They baptized more than 100 while traveling through Ohio, Pennsylvania, and New Jersey. Parley P. Pratt arrived in Northern New Jersey as a missionary in 1837. Benjamin Winchester and Jedediah M. Grant arrived the same year to preach in Southern New Jersey.

The first branch, the Toms River Branch was organized in 1838. In November 1845, the Church sent a directive that all Latter-day Saints along the Eastern Seaboard prepare to move to the Rocky Mountains. Some New Jersey members were among those that traveled to California in 1846 on the ship Brooklyn. There were 21 organized branches in 1848. Church membership in the 1850s and 1860s dwindled in New Jersey as missionary work was occasional and those that did join were encouraged to go west.

In 1893 when the Eastern-States Mission was re-established, but Church activity was slow to resume. By 1920 a branch was organized in Newark. Other congregations were established. The Newark Branch moved to East Orange and became the East Orange Ward of the New York Stake in 1934. The East Orange Ward eventually moved to Short Hills and was renamed the Short Hills Ward September 9, 1953, where it still remains today. In 1960, the New Jersey Stake was created.

In 2013, a new meetinghouse was built in Newark, New Jersey, a 35,000-square-foot (3,300 m^{2}) church topped by a 45-foot (14 m) steeple adjacent to the Newark Broad Street station.

In 2014, a meetinghouse was built in Camden, New Jersey.

David L. Buckner presided over the formation of the first Young Adult stake in the New York City region on June 18, 2018.

Temples near New Jersey
Red = Operating
Blue = Under Construction
Yellow = announced
Black = Closed for Renovations

== Stakes ==
As of July 2026, New Jersey had the following stakes (with the stake center in New Jersey):

Stake	Organized	Mission	Temple District
Cherry Hill New Jersey Stake	18 Nov 1979	Pennsylvania Philadelphia	Philadelphia Pennsylvania
East Brunswick New Jersey Stake	26 Mar 1967	New Jersey Morristown	Philadelphia Pennsylvania
Liberty Park New Jersey Stake	20 Sep 2015	New Jersey Morristown	Manhattan New York
Morristown New Jersey Stake	26 Feb 1976	New Jersey Morristown	Manhattan New York
Scotch Plains New Jersey Stake	15 Sep 1996	New Jersey Morristown	Manhattan New York
Soldier Hill New Jersey Stake	12 Apr 1981	New Jersey Morristown	Manhattan New York

== Missions ==
Missionary work started shortly after the Church was organized in 1830. The Eastern States Mission, the Church's 2nd mission (behind the British Mission), was established on May 6, 1839 but discontinued in April of 1850. The Eastern States Mission was re-established in January 1893. On June 20, 1974, it was renamed the New York New York Mission. The New Jersey Morristown Mission was organized from the New York New York Mission on July 1, 1987. The New Jersey Cherry Hill was organized in 1995 then discontinued in 2010 and made up portions of the New Jersey Morristown and the Pennsylvania Philadelphia Missions. As of June 2021, the entire state was covered either by the Morristown or Philadelphia Missions.

== Temples ==
Two temples, directly adjacent to the state, serve members in New Jersey.

119. Manhattan New York Temple (Closed for renovation); Official website; News & images	
Location: Announced: Groundbreaking: Dedicated: Size:	New York City, U.S. August 7, 2002 by Gordon B. Hinckley; September 23, 2002 by Gordon B. Hinckley; June 13, 2004 by Gordon B. Hinckley; 20,630 sq ft (1,917 m^{2}) on a 0.3-acre (0.12 ha) site - designed by Frank Fernandez
152. Philadelphia Pennsylvania Temple; Official website; News & images	
Location: Announced: Groundbreaking: Dedicated: Size: Notes:	Philadelphia, Pennsylvania, U.S. October 4, 2008 by Thomas S. Monson; September 17, 2011 by Henry B. Eyring; September 18, 2016 by Henry B. Eyring; 61,466 sq ft (5,710.4 m^{2}) on a 1.6-acre (0.65 ha) site Announced at the 178th Semiannual General Conference.

On 6 October 2024, church president Russell M Nelson announced the Summit New Jersey Temple, the first in the state.

366. Summit New Jersey Temple (Announced); Official website; News & images	
Location: Announced:	Summit, New Jersey, United States; 6 October 2024 by Russell M. Nelson

== See also ==
- The Church of Jesus Christ of Latter-day Saints membership statistics (United States)
- New Jersey: Religion
