= The Church of Jesus Christ of Latter-day Saints in Maryland =

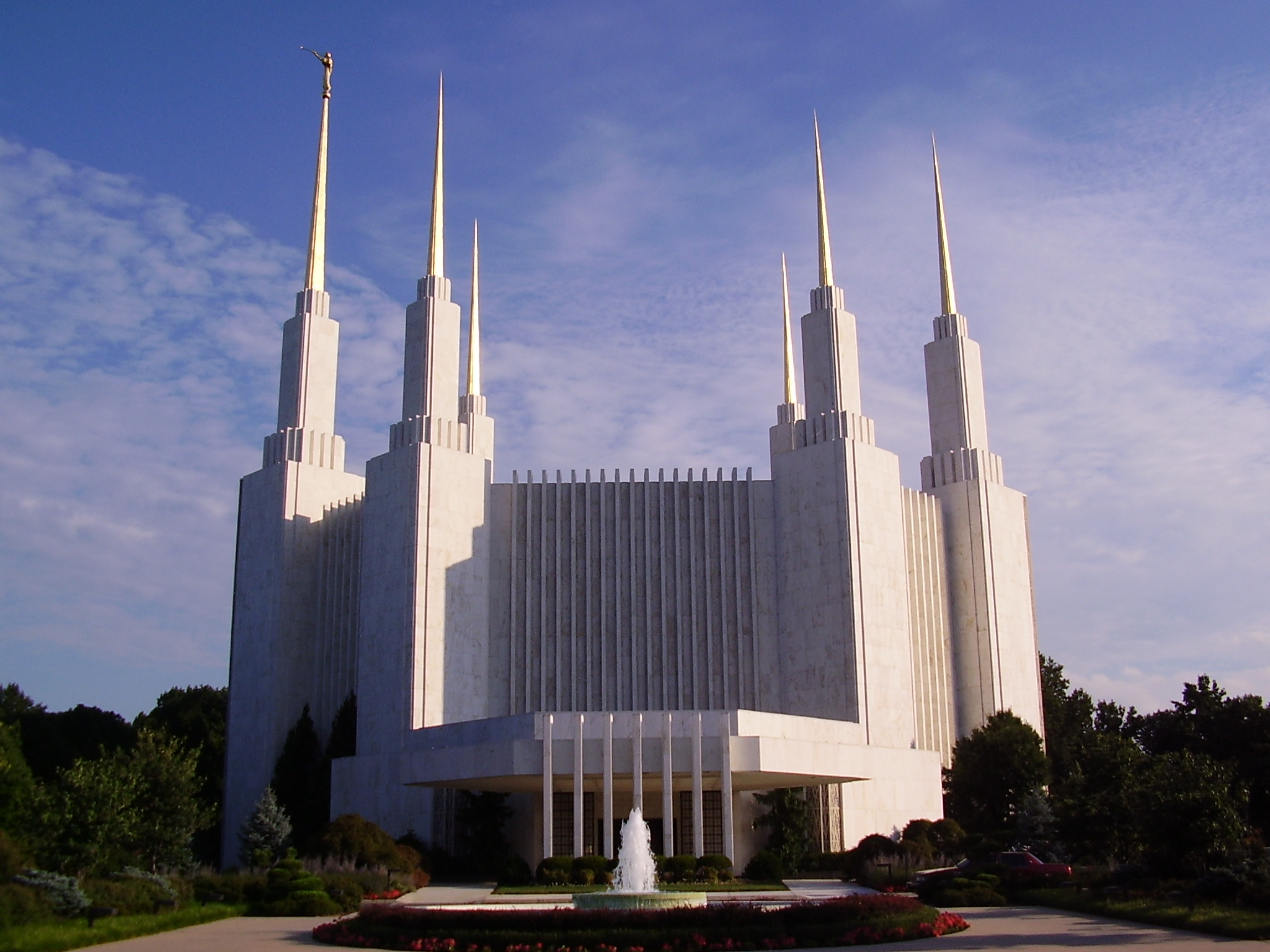
- The Washington D.C. Temple in Kensington, Maryland
- Area: US Northeast
- Members: 44,671 (2025)
- Stakes: 10
- Wards: 65
- Branches: 19
- Total Congregations: 84
- Missions: 2
- Temples: 1
- FamilySearch Centers: 14

The Church of Jesus Christ of Latter-day Saints in Maryland refers to the Church of Jesus Christ of Latter-day Saints (LDS Church) and its members in Maryland. The official church membership as a percentage of general population was 0.72% in 2014. According to the 2014 Pew Forum on Religion & Public Life survey, roughly 1% of Marylanders self-identify themselves most closely with The Church of Jesus Christ of Latter-day Saints. The LDS Church is the 8th largest denomination in Maryland.

== History ==
Membership in Maryland
| Year | Membership |
|---|---|
| 1983 | 16,495 |
| 1989* | 28,000 |
| 1999 | 34,113 |
| 2009 | 39,258 |
| 2019 | 43,411 |
| 2025 | 44,671 |
*Membership was published as a rounded number. Source: Wendall J. Ashton; Jim M. Wall, Deseret News, various years, Church Almanac State Information: Maryland

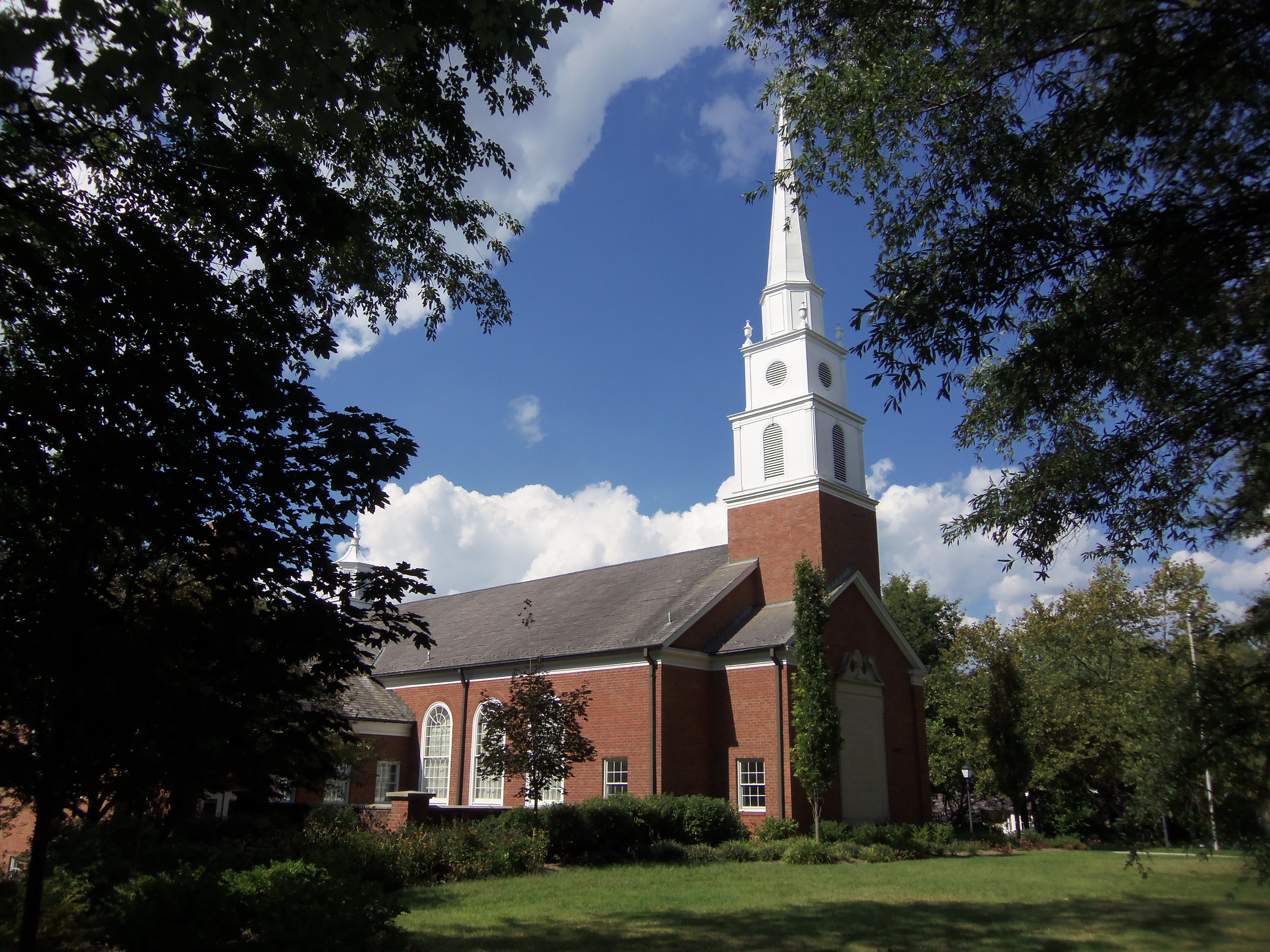
A historic meetinghouse in Chevy Chase. This meetinghouse burned down in 2023.

Erastus Snow began preaching in Maryland with three other missionaries in 1837.

The temple in Kensington is one of Maryland's most prominent landmarks and was completed in 1974.

In November 2000, the Washington D.C. Temple Visitors Center was rededicated after remodeling and the installation of new exhibits.

== Stakes ==
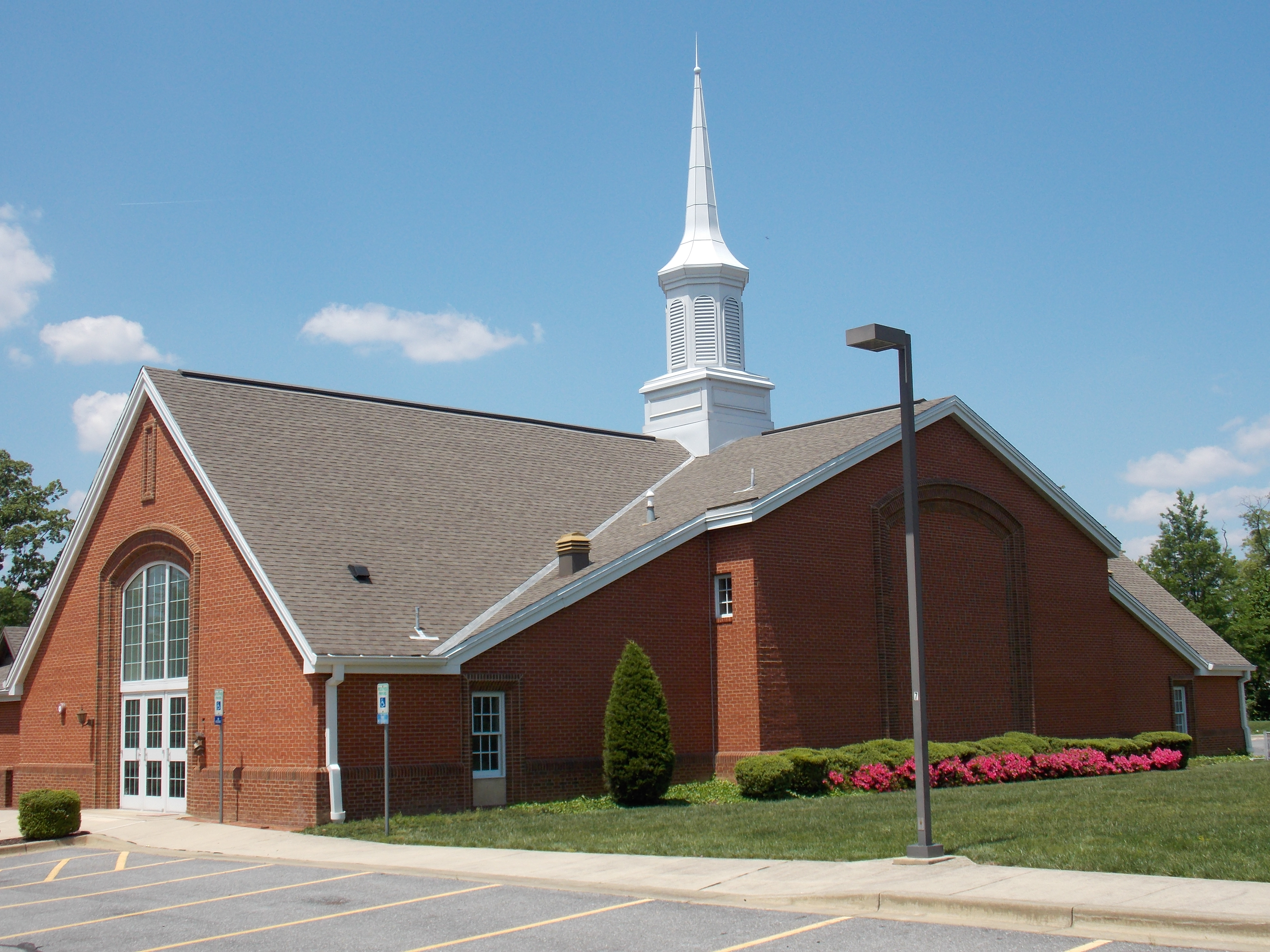
The Church of Jesus Christ of Latter-day Saints in Takoma Park, Maryland.

As of July 2026, the following stakes had congregations located in Maryland:

| Stake | Organized | Mission | Temple District |
|---|---|---|---|
| Annapolis Maryland | 12 Jun 1983 | Washington DC North | Washington D.C. |
| Baltimore Maryland | 8 Dec 1974 | Maryland Baltimore | Washington D.C. |
| Clarksburg West Virginia* | 6 May 1979 | West Virginia Charleston | Pittsburgh Pennsylvania |
| Columbia Maryland | 10 Nov 1991 | Maryland Baltimore | Washington D.C. |
| Dover Delaware* | 15 Apr 2012 | Pennsylvania Philadelphia | Philadelphia Pennsylvania |
| Frederick Maryland | 12 Dec 1982 | Maryland Baltimore | Washington D.C. |
| Gettysburg Pennsylvania* | 28 Mar 2021 | Maryland Baltimore | Washington D.C. |
| Hagerstown Maryland | 19 Apr 1970 | Maryland Baltimore | Washington D.C. |
| Seneca Maryland | 27 Oct 1985 | Washington DC North | Washington D.C. |
| Silver Spring Maryland | 13 Sep 1970 | Washington DC North | Washington D.C. |
| Suitland Maryland | 19 Aug 1979 | Washington DC North | Washington D.C. |
| Washington DC | 30 Jun 1940 | Washington DC North | Washington D.C. |
| Washington DC YSA North | 14 Nov 2021 | Washington DC North | Washington D.C. |
| Wilmington Delaware* | 8 Dec 1974 | Pennsylvania Philadelphia | Philadelphia Pennsylvania |

- *Stakes outside the state with congregations in Maryland

== Missions ==
- Maryland Baltimore Mission
- Washington D.C. North Mission

== Temple ==
The Washington D.C. Temple was dedicated on November 19, 1974, by President Spencer W. Kimball.

| 16. Washington D.C. Temple; Official website; News & images | |
| Location: Announced: Groundbreaking: Dedicated: Rededicated: Size: | Kensington, Maryland, United States; November 15, 1968 by David O. McKay; December 7, 1968 by Hugh B. Brown; November 19, 1974 by Spencer W. Kimball; August 14, 2022 by Russell M. Nelson; 156,558 sq ft (14,544.7 m^{2}) on a 52-acre (21 ha) site - designed by Fred L. Markham, Harold K. Beecher, Henry P. Fetzer, and Keith W. Wilcox |
