= The Church of Jesus Christ of Latter-day Saints in Delaware =

- Area: NA Northeast
- Members: 6,018 (2025)
- Stakes: 2
- Wards: 9
- Branches: 1
- Total Congregations: 10
- FamilySearch Centers: 3

The Church of Jesus Christ of Latter-day Saints in Delaware refers to the Church of Jesus Christ of Latter-day Saints (LDS Church) and its members in Delaware. As of 2025, the LDS Church reported 6,018 members in 10 congregations.

Official church membership as a percentage of general population was 0.55% in 2014. According to the 2014 Pew Forum on Religion & Public Life survey, less than 1% of Delawareans self-identify themselves most closely with the LDS Church. The LDS Church is the 11th largest denomination in Delaware.

== History ==
Membership in Delaware
Year	Membership
1941	19
1960	400
1974	1,350
1980	1,767
1990	3,178
1999	3,730
2009	4,716
2019	5,634
2024	5,865
2025	6,018
*Membership was published as a rounded number. Source: Wendall J. Ashton; Jim M. Wall, Deseret News, various years, Church Almanac State Information: Delaware

Missionaries for LDS Church arrived in Delaware in 1837.

Block teaching began in 1941 among some 16 LDS families meetings began May 4, and the Wilmington branch was organized September 28, 1941. The branch, with 9 adults and 10 children, continued with little growth for the next decade. In 1950, some 63 attended a branch party at the home of the branch president. The Salisbury Branch was organized in 1953. The Dover Branch was organized later that decade.

In 2010, Delaware member Bruce Winn, CEO of 1,100 employees at the Corporation Service Co., left the company to serve as a mission president and, later, as the first temple president of the Philadelphia Pennsylvania Temple.

== Stakes ==
In 1960, the Philadelphia Stake was created which included Delaware congregations. Prior to that, the congregations were part of the Washington Stake. On December 8, 1974, the Wilmington Delaware Stake was created covering the Delaware and nearby areas in Maryland, New Jersey, and Pennsylvania. On November 18, 1979, the New Jersey Wards and branches of the Wilmington Stake were organized as the Pitman New Jersey Stake (reorganized as the Cherry Hill New Jersey Stake on September 23, 1986).

On June 18, 2006, William W. John, programs manager at DuPont, became stake president for the Wilmington Delaware Stake.

On April 12, 2012, The Dover Delaware stake (Delaware's second) was created from the Wilmington Delaware Stake.

As of May 2025, Delaware had the following congregations:

Dover Delaware Stake

- Camden Ward
- Harrington Ward
- Salisbury Ward (Maryland)
- Seaford Ward
- Smyrna Ward

Wilmington Delaware Stake

- Bayview Ward (Maryland)
- Newark 1st Ward
- Newark 3rd Ward
- Wilmington 1st Ward
- Wilmington 2nd Ward
- Wilmington 3rd Ward (Spanish)
- Newark YSA Branch

== Missions ==
Delaware is part of the Pennsylvania Philadelphia Mission.

== Temples ==
Delaware is part of the Philadelphia Pennsylvania Temple District.

152. Philadelphia Pennsylvania Temple; Official website; News & images	
Location: Announced: Groundbreaking: Dedicated: Size: Notes:	Philadelphia, Pennsylvania, U.S. October 4, 2008 by Thomas S. Monson; September 17, 2011 by Henry B. Eyring; September 18, 2016 by Henry B. Eyring; 61,466 sq ft (5,710.4 m^{2}) on a 1.6-acre (0.65 ha) site Announced at the 178th Semiannual General Conference.

== See also ==
- The Church of Jesus Christ of Latter-day Saints membership statistics (United States)
