= The Church of Jesus Christ of Latter-day Saints in Kansas =

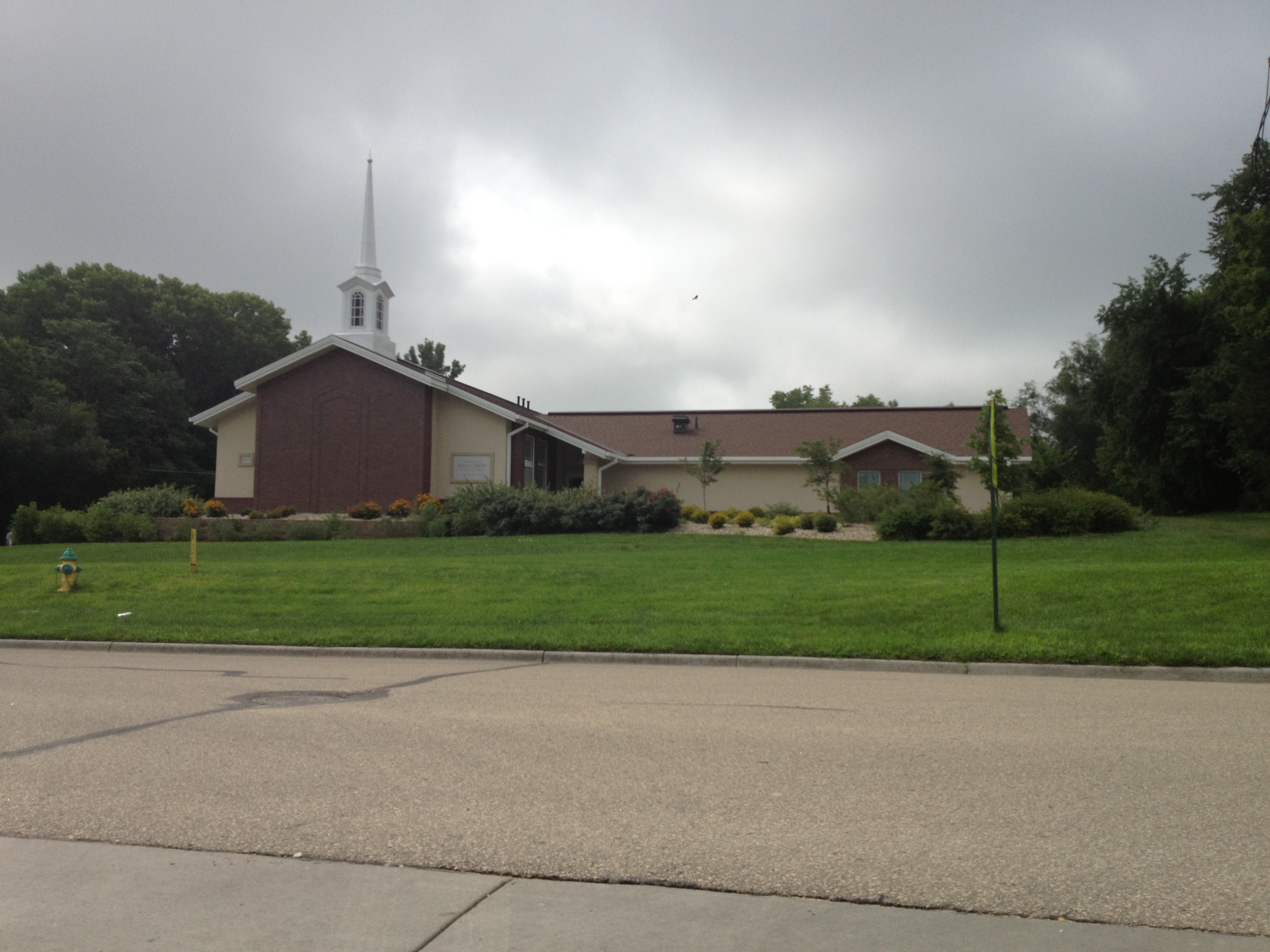
- A meetinghouse of The Church of Jesus Christ of Latter-day Saints in Concordia, Kansas.
- Area: US Central
- Members: 39,838 (2025)
- Stakes: 7
- Wards: 60
- Branches: 15
- Total Congregations: 75
- Missions: 1
- Temples: 1 announced
- FamilySearch Centers: 29

The Church of Jesus Christ of Latter-day Saints in Kansas refers to the Church of Jesus Christ of Latter-day Saints (LDS Church) and its members in Kansas. The first congregation of the church in Kansas was organized in 1895. As of 2025, it has grown to 39,838 members in 75 congregations.

Official church membership as a percentage of general population was 1.25% in 2014. According to the 2014 Pew Forum on Religion & Public Life survey, roughly 1% of Kansans self-identify themselves most closely with the LDS Church. The LDS Church is the 10th largest denomination in Kansas.

== History ==
In 1882, missionaries arrived in Kansas and organized the Meridian Branch.

By 1930, church membership in Kansas was 2,060 and the first stake in Kansas was organized in June 1962.

The Kansas City Missouri Temple, dedicated in 2012, serves 45,000 LDS Church members from 126 congregations in Kansas and Missouri.

== Stakes ==
As of July 2026, there were 8 stakes centered in Kansas, with 4 others that encompass geographic parts of the state.

Stake	Organized	Mission	Temple District
Bartlesville Oklahoma (Note: Stake located outside Kansas with congregation(s) meeting in Kansas)	November 2, 2014	Oklahoma Tulsa	Oklahoma City Oklahoma
Derby Kansas	March 8, 1998	Kansas Wichita	Oklahoma City Oklahoma
Garden City Kansas	May 18, 2003	Kansas Wichita	Denver Colorado
Joplin Missouri	August 28, 1977	Arkansas Bentonville	Bentonville Arkansas
Kearney Nebraska	June 16, 1991	Nebraska Omaha	Winter Quarters Nebraska
Lenexa Kansas	October 16, 1994	Missouri Kansas City	Kansas City Missouri
Olathe Kansas	October 19, 1986	Missouri Kansas City	Kansas City Missouri
Overland Park Kansas	June 1, 2025	Missouri Kansas City	Kansas City Missouri
Platte City Missouri	March 9, 1997	Missouri Independence	Kansas City Missouri
Salina Kansas	May 29, 1988	Kansas Wichita	Kansas City Missouri
Topeka Kansas	February 29, 1976	Kansas Wichita	Kansas City Missouri
Wichita Kansas	June 24, 1962	Kansas Wichita	Oklahoma City Oklahoma

== Missions ==
On February 22, 2013, the Kansas Wichita Mission was announced, created largely from the Missouri Independence Mission.

== Temples ==
Temples in and near Kansas
- = Operating
- = Under construction
- = Announced
- = Closed for renovation

228. Wichita Kansas Temple (Dedication scheduled); Official website; News & images	
Location: Announced: Groundbreaking: Open House: Dedicated: Size:	Wichita, Kansas; 3 April 2022 by Russell M. Nelson; 7 September 2024 by Steven R. Bangerter; 24 September-10 October 2026 scheduled for 1 November 2026; 9,950 sq ft (924 m^{2}) on a 6.42-acre (2.60 ha) site

== See also ==
- The Church of Jesus Christ of Latter-day Saints membership statistics (United States)
- Religion in Kansas
