= The Church of Jesus Christ of Latter-day Saints in Nebraska =

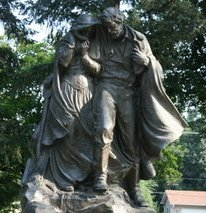
- Pioneer statue at Winter Quarters (North Omaha, Nebraska)
- Area: US Central
- Members: 26,199 (2025)
- Stakes: 5
- Wards: 42
- Branches: 15
- Total Congregations: 57
- Missions: 1
- Temples: 1
- FamilySearch Centers: 18

The Church of Jesus Christ of Latter-day Saints in Nebraska refers to the Church of Jesus Christ of Latter-day Saints (LDS Church) and its members in Nebraska. The official church membership as a percentage of general population was 1.29% in 2014. According to the 2014 Pew Forum on Religion & Public Life survey, roughly 1% of Nebraskans self-identify themselves most closely with the LDS Church. The LDS Church is the 6th largest denomination in Nebraska.

Stakes are located in Kearney, Lincoln, and Omaha (3).

Membership in Nebraska
| Year | Membership |
|---|---|
| 1983 | 8,196 |
| 1989* | 12,000 |
| 1999 | 18,613 |
| 2009 | 22,372 |
| 2019 | 25,098 |
| 2024 | 26,199 |
*Membership was published as a rounded number. Source: Wendall J. Ashton; Jim M. Wall, Deseret News, various years, Church Almanac State Information: Nebraska

== History ==
Members of the LDS Church first traveled to what is now the state of Nebraska in 1846. Following the succession crisis in 1844, members of the church who followed Brigham Young left Nauvoo, Illinois in the spring of 1846. Due to difficulty crossing Iowa, they spent the winter of 1846-47 in encampments across Iowa and Nebraska. Winter Quarters, on the Nebraska side of the Missouri River, became an important stopping site for church members in their trek towards the Great Basin.

Following the Transcontinental railroad being built through Nebraska, LDS Church presence in Nebraska was rather limited. The first branch following the pioneer period was organized in Fremont in 1877, and a branch was established in Omaha by 1900. The first stake of the church was organized in 1960 in Omaha, with congregations being in several cities across the state. Stakes have since been created in Lincoln, Kearney, and the suburbs around Omaha.

== Stakes ==
As of July 2026, the following Stakes had Stake Centers in Nebraska:

| Stake | Organized | Mission | Temple District |
|---|---|---|---|
| Council Bluffs Iowa* | 25 Apr 1999 | Nebraska Omaha | Winter Quarters Nebraska |
| Cheyenne Wyoming East* | 21 Apr 2013 | Wyoming Cheyenne | Fort Collins Colorado |
| Kearney Nebraska | 16 Jun 1991 | Nebraska Omaha | Winter Quarters Nebraska |
| Lincoln Nebraska | 27 Oct 1974 | Nebraska Omaha | Winter Quarters Nebraska |
| Omaha Nebraska | 11 Dec 1960 | Nebraska Omaha | Winter Quarters Nebraska |
| Omaha Nebraska Millard | 31 Mar 2019 | Nebraska Omaha | Winter Quarters Nebraska |
| Omaha Nebraska Papillion | 2 Nov 1986 | Nebraska Omaha | Winter Quarters Nebraska |
| Rapid City South Dakota* | 10 Dec 1972 | North Dakota Bismarck | Casper Wyoming |
| Sioux City Iowa* | 21 Jan 1996 | Nebraska Omaha | Winter Quarters Nebraska |

- Stakes with stake center outside of the state but had congregations in Nebraska

== Missions ==
The large majority of Nebraska are located in the Nebraska Omaha Mission. Congregations in Nebraska pertaining to the Rapid City South Dakota Stake are located in the North Dakota Bismarck Mission, while those in the Cheyenne Wyoming East Stake are located in the Colorado Fort Collins Mission.

== Temples ==
The Winter Quarters Nebraska Temple was dedicated on April 22, 2001, by church president Gordon B. Hinckley. The large majority of the state is located in this temple district, although a few congregations are located Fort Collins Colorado and Bismarck North Dakota Temple Districts.

| 104. Winter Quarters Nebraska Temple; Official website; News & images | |
| Location: Announced: Groundbreaking: Dedicated: Size: Style: | Omaha, Nebraska, U.S. June 14, 1999 by Gordon B. Hinckley; November 28, 1999 by Hugh W. Pinnock; April 22, 2001 by Gordon B. Hinckley; 16,000 sq ft (1,500 m^{2}) on a 1.92-acre (0.78 ha) site Classic modern, single-spire design - designed by Dan Reinhardt |

== See also ==
- The Church of Jesus Christ of Latter-day Saints membership statistics (United States)
- Nebraska: Religion
- Blaine County, Nebraska
