= The Church of Jesus Christ of Latter-day Saints in Rhode Island =

- Area: US Northeast
- Members: 5,025 (2025)
- Stakes: 1
- Wards: 8
- Branches: 1
- Total Congregations: 9
- FamilySearch Centers: 1

The Church of Jesus Christ of Latter-day Saints in Rhode Island refers to the Church of Jesus Christ of Latter-day Saints (LDS Church) and its members in Rhode Island.

Official church membership as a percentage of general population was 0.38% in 2014. According to the 2014 Pew Forum on Religion & Public Life survey, less than 1% of Rhode Islanders self-identify themselves most closely with the LDS Church. The LDS Church is the 8th largest denomination in Rhode Island.

== History ==
Membership in Rhode Island
Year	Membership
1908	14
1937	50
1974	799
1980	1,052
1989*	1,700
1999	3,214
2009	3,711
2019	4,259
2025	5,025
*Membership was published as a rounded number. Source: Wendall J. Ashton; Jim M. Wall, Deseret News, various years, Church Almanac State Information: Rhode Island

The first missionaries to arrive in Rhode Island were Orson Hyde and Samuel H. Smith. They arrived in Providence on 13 July 1832 but were driven out 12 days later. By 1844, 2 branches, Providence and Newport, had been established in the state. In 1844, the church had 221 members. Following the death of Joseph Smith in 1844, baptised members were instructed to migrate west to join the main body of the church.

Other than occasional missionaries, and short-lived congregations, there were no continual presence of the church until February 1937 when Oscar E. Johnson was transferred to Providence by his employer. He attended the New Bedford Branch in Massachusetts for several months and then in September 1937, he was appointed to be president of the Providence Branch. The church purchased a library in Providence that was converted into a meetinghouse and dedicated in June 1944. In March 1944, the Newport Branch was organized.

Providence and Newport were the only branches in Rhode Island for 30 years until a meetinghouse was built in Warwick. In 1977, the Providence Rhode Island Stake was created from the Boston and Hartford stakes. At the time, this stake included 3 congregations in Rhode Island and 6 congregations in Massachusetts and Connecticut. In 1981, the stake was divided to create the Hingham Massachusetts Stake, and a Spanish speaking congregation was organized in Warwick.

In June 2016, the Providence Rhode Island Stake was divided to create the New London Connecticut Stake.

There is one family history center in Rhode Island located in Providence.

== Stake and Congregations ==
LDS Church Locations as of May 2025
Green = Stake Center and meetinghouse
Purple = meetinghouse
(FHC) = Family History Center

As of May 2025, the following congregations met in Rhode Island

Providence Rhode Island Stake

- Cranston Ward
- Narragansett Ward
- Newport Ward
- Providence Ward (Spanish)
- Providence YSA Branch
- Scituate Ward
- Warwick Ward

Blackstone Valley Massachusetts Stake

- Pawtucket Ward

New London Connecticut Stake

- Westerly Branch

== Missions ==
Missionary work started shortly after the Church was organized in 1830. The Eastern States Mission, the Church's 2nd mission (behind the British Mission), was established on May 6, 1839, but discontinued in April 1850. The Eastern States Mission was re-established in January 1893. On September 24, 1937, the New England Mission was created from the Eastern States Mission. The New England Mission was renamed the Massachusetts Boston Mission on June 20, 1974.

== Temples ==
With exception of the Westerly Branch in southwestern Rhode Island, the state is in the Boston Massachusetts Temple District. The Westerly Branch is in the Hartford Connecticut Temple District.

100. Boston Massachusetts Temple; Official website; News & images	
Location: Announced: Groundbreaking: Dedicated: Size: Style:	Belmont, Massachusetts, United States; September 30, 1995 by Gordon B. Hinckley; June 13, 1997 by Richard G. Scott; October 1, 2000 by Gordon B. Hinckley; 69,600 sq ft (6,470 m^{2}) on a 8-acre (3.2 ha) site Classic modern, single-spire design - designed by Tsoi/Kobus & Associates and Church A&E Services

== See also ==
- The Church of Jesus Christ of Latter-day Saints membership statistics (United States)
- Rhode Island: Religion
