= The Church of Jesus Christ of Latter-day Saints in Pennsylvania =

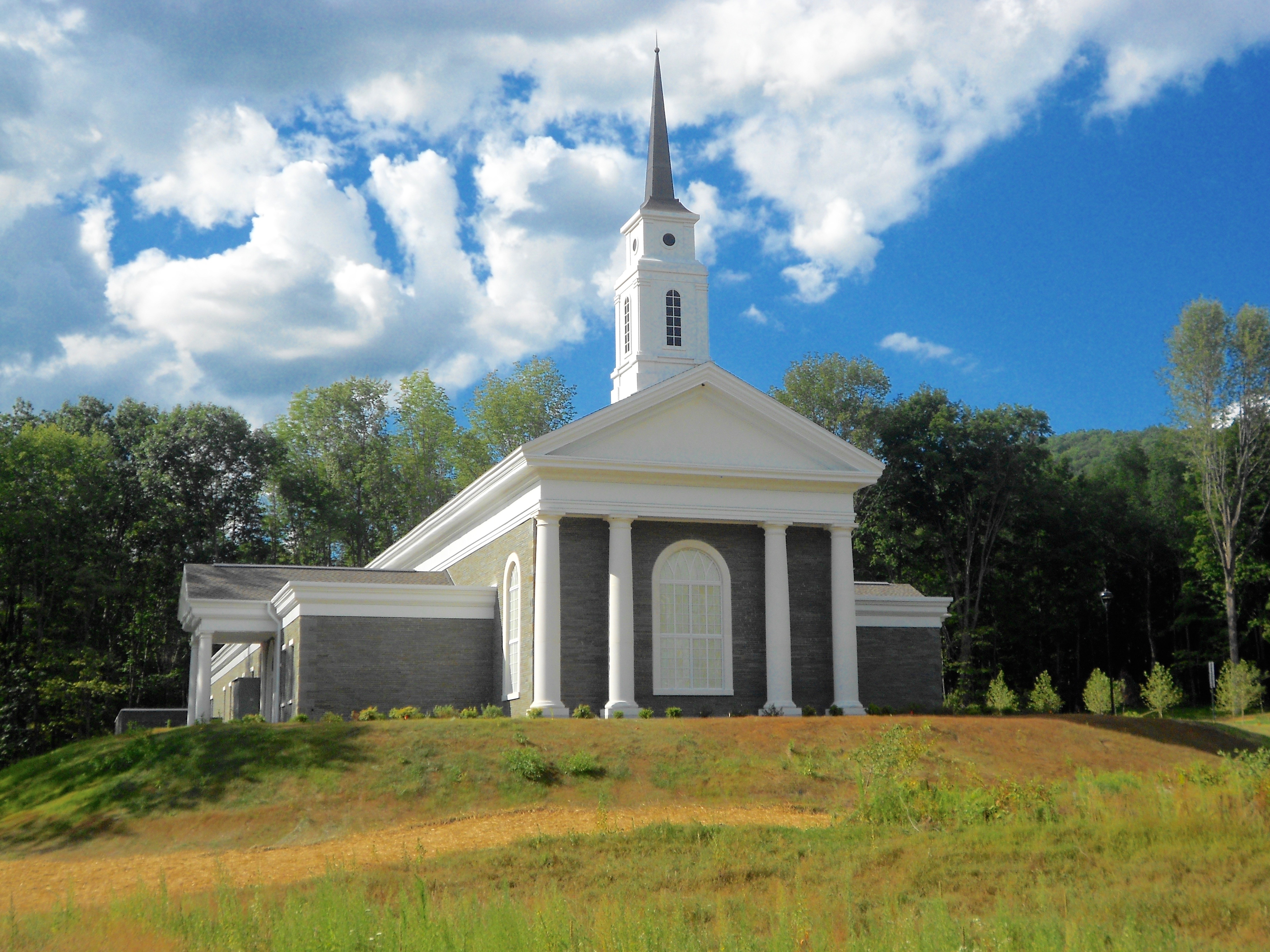
- A meetinghouse of The Church of Jesus Christ of Latter-day Saints in Oakland Township, Susquehanna County, Pennsylvania.
- Area: US Northeast
- Members: 54,354 (2025)
- Stakes: 13
- Wards: 75
- Branches: 30
- Total Congregations: 105
- Missions: 2
- Temples: 2 operating 1 announced 3 total
- FamilySearch Centers: 46

The Church of Jesus Christ of Latter-day Saints in Pennsylvania refers to the Church of Jesus Christ of Latter-day Saints (LDS Church) and its members in Pennsylvania. Joseph and Emma Smith lived in Northern Pennsylvania near the Susquehanna River just prior to the organization of the Church of Christ. Much of the translation of the Book of Mormon and revelation of the priesthood occurred here during that time.

Official church membership as a percentage of general population was 0.41% in 2019. According to the 2014 Pew Forum on Religion & Public Life survey, less than 1% of Pennsylvanians self-identify themselves most closely with the LDS Church. The church is the 13th largest denomination in Pennsylvania.

== History ==
Membership in Pennsylvania
Year	Membership
1940	900
1960	4,600
1979	18,146
1989*	28,000
1999	37,749
2009	48,477
2019	52,290
2025	54,354
*Membership was published as a rounded number. Source: Wendall J. Ashton; Jim M. Wall, Deseret News, various years, Church Almanac State Information: Pennsylvania

Joseph Smith and other future members of the Church of Christ, the original name of the Latter Day Saint church founded by Smith, were baptized in the Susquehanna River in May 1829.

A total of 12 congregations were organized in Pennsylvania in the 1830s, before members gathered to Ohio, Missouri, and Illinois.

In 2016 Inga Saffron, architecture critic for The Philadelphia Inquirer, called the new Philadelphia Pennsylvania Temple "the most radical work of architecture built in Philadelphia in a half-century ... because it dares to be so out of step with today's design sensibilities and our bottom-line culture." Estimating its cost as more than $100 million, she wrote that the temple was "the real classical deal" and "a bold incursion into the hierarchical fabric of Philadelphia".

== Stakes ==
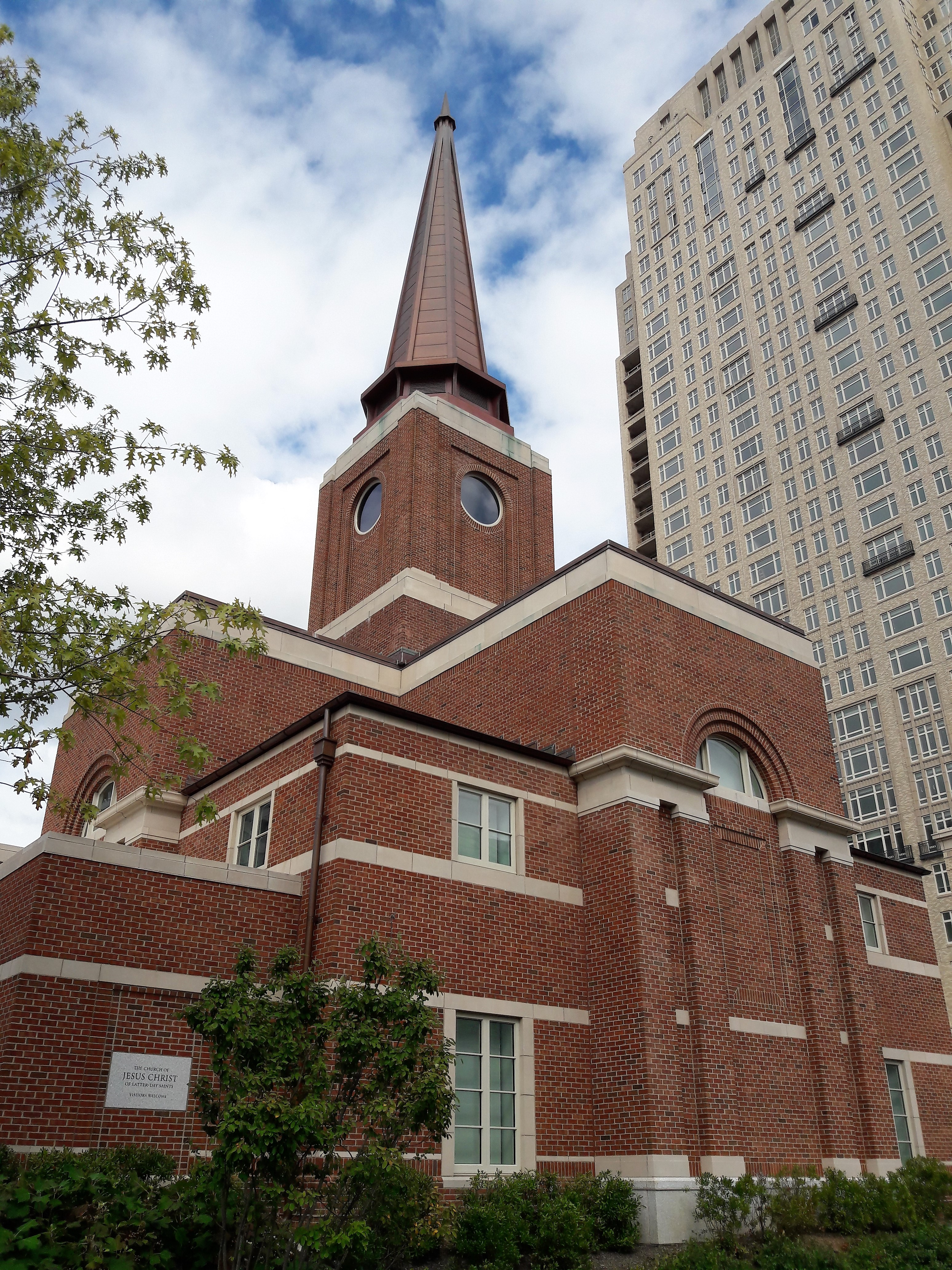
A meetinghouse of the LDS Church in Philadelphia, Pennsylvania.

As of September 2026, Pennsylvania had the following stakes:

Stake	Organized	Mission	Temple District
Altoona Pennsylvania	23 Jul 1978	Pennsylvania Pittsburgh	Pittsburgh Pennsylvania
Gettysburg Pennsylvania	28 March 2021	Maryland Baltimore	Washington D.C.
Hagerstown Maryland (Note: Stake located outside of Pennsylvania with congregation(s) meeting in Pennsylvania)	19 Apr 1970	Maryland Baltimore	Washington D.C.
Harrisburg Pennsylvania	12 Aug 1979	Pennsylvania Pittsburgh	Philadelphia Pennsylvania
Hiram Ohio Stake	18 Feb 2007	Ohio Columbus	Pittsburgh Pennsylvania
Jamestown New York	16 May 1995	Pennsylvania Pittsburgh	Pittsburgh Pennsylvania
Lancaster Pennsylvania	24 Mar 2013	Maryland Baltimore	Philadelphia Pennsylvania
Philadelphia Pennsylvania	16 Oct 1960	Pennsylvania Philadelphia	Philadelphia Pennsylvania
Pittsburgh Pennsylvania	11 May 1969	Pennsylvania Pittsburgh	Pittsburgh Pennsylvania
Pittsburgh Pennsylvania North	26 Nov 1978	Pennsylvania Pittsburgh	Pittsburgh Pennsylvania
Pittsburgh Pennsylvania West	7 Sep 2014	Pennsylvania Pittsburgh	Pittsburgh Pennsylvania
Reading Pennsylvania	31 Oct 1982	Pennsylvania Philadelphia	Philadelphia Pennsylvania
Scranton Pennsylvania	2 Aug 1979	Pennsylvania Philadelphia	Philadelphia Pennsylvania
Valley Forge Pennsylvania	14 Feb 1999	Pennsylvania Philadelphia	Philadelphia Pennsylvania
Williamsport Pennsylvania	13 Apr 1997	Pennsylvania Pittsburgh	Philadelphia Pennsylvania

== Missions ==
- Pennsylvania Philadelphia Mission
- Pennsylvania Pittsburgh Mission

== Temples ==
Temples in Pennsylvania
- = Operating
- = Under construction
- = Announced
- = Temporarily Closed

152. Philadelphia Pennsylvania Temple; Official website; News & images	
Location: Announced: Groundbreaking: Dedicated: Size: Notes:	Philadelphia, Pennsylvania, U.S. October 4, 2008 by Thomas S. Monson; September 17, 2011 by Henry B. Eyring; September 18, 2016 by Henry B. Eyring; 61,466 sq ft (5,710.4 m^{2}) on a 1.6-acre (0.65 ha) site Announced at the 178th Semiannual General Conference.
196. Pittsburgh Pennsylvania Temple; Official website; News & images	
Location: Announced: Groundbreaking: Dedicated: Size:	Cranberry Township, Pennsylvania, United States; 5 April 2020 by Russell M. Nelson; 21 August 2021 by Randall K. Bennett; 15 September 2024 by Dieter F. Uchtdorf; 32,240 sq ft (2,995 m^{2}) on a 5.8-acre (2.3 ha) site
325. Harrisburg Pennsylvania Temple (Site announced); Official website; News & images	
Location: Announced: Size:	Harrisburg, Pennsylvania, United States; 2 April 2023 by Russell M. Nelson; 20,000 sq ft (1,900 m^{2}) on a 5.36-acre (2.17 ha) site
