= The Church of Jesus Christ of Latter-day Saints in Maine =

- Area: US Northeast
- Members: 11,275 (2025)
- Stakes: 3
- Wards: 17
- Branches: 9
- Total Congregations: 26
- FamilySearch Centers: 10

The Church of Jesus Christ of Latter-day Saints in Maine refers to the Church of Jesus Christ of Latter-day Saints (LDS Church) and its members in Maine. Official church membership as a percentage of general population was 0.81% in 2014. According to the 2014 Pew Forum on Religion & Public Life survey, roughly 2% of Mainers self-identify themselves most closely with the LDS Church.

The LDS Church is the 6th largest denomination in Maine.

== History ==
In June, 1832, the first recorded Latter-day Saint missionaries – Horace Cowen and Hazen Aldrich, visited Maine. They lodged in the home of Daniel Bean, Jr., who lived in an unorganized territory "just north of Lake Umbagog." Missionaries of all denominations were "usually welcomed" by the community, "for the news they brought from the 'civilized' world, and for many the preaching provided a change from the daily round of farm work and homemaking chores."

Cowen and Aldrich's preaching "was so well received that the Mormons soon organized a church of a large number of members, entirely breaking up the Free Will Baptists and the Congregationalists."

On September 19, 1832, missionaries Orson Hyde and Samuel Smith crossed the Piscataqua River and entered Maine. Shortly after, a branch was established in the Saco-Biddeford area. Other branches followed, and in 1835, members of the newly organized Quorum of the Twelve Apostles met in Farmington to establish the Maine Conference which, at the time, consisted of 4 branches and 100 members.

By 1844, 500 persons were baptized. Most migrated west during this time to join the main body of the church. Peter Smith Bean, the son of Daniel Bean Jr., later would recall about his community: "“They took whole families . . . . Half the settlers left and were believers in the Mormon doctrine.”

== Stakes ==
Green = Stake Center
*The Augusta Stake Center is located in Farmingdale and the Portland Stake Center is located in Topsham.

As of July 2026, the following stakes have congregations in Maine:

Stake	Organized	Mission	Temple
Augusta Maine Stake	23 June 1968	New Hampshire Manchester	Boston Massachusetts
Bangor Maine Stake	20 April 1986	New Hampshire Manchester	Boston Massachusetts
Exeter New Hampshire Stake*	6 Sep 1981	New Hampshire Manchester	Boston Massachusetts
Portland Maine Stake	8 June 2025	New Hampshire Manchester	Boston Massachusetts

- Stake outside of Maine with a congregation within Maine

== Mission ==
Most of the state is in the New Hampshire Manchester Mission with the far eastern side being in the Canada Montreal Mission.

== Temples ==
Most of the state is in the Boston Massachusetts Temple District with the far eastern side being in the Halifax Nova Scotia Temple District.

On December 14, 2025, the intent to build the Portland Maine Temple was announced by the church's First Presidency.

383. Portland Maine Temple (Announced); Official website; News & images	
Location: Announced:	Portland; 14 December 2025 by Dallin H. Oaks

== See also ==
Religion in Maine
