= The Church of Jesus Christ of Latter-day Saints in New Hampshire =

- Area: US Northeast
- Members: 8,575 (2025)
- Stakes: 3
- Wards: 14
- Branches: 4
- Total Congregations: 18
- Missions: 1
- FamilySearch Centers: 6

The Church of Jesus Christ of Latter-day Saints in New Hampshire refers to the Church of Jesus Christ of Latter-day Saints (LDS Church) and its members in New Hampshire.

Official church membership as a percentage of general population was 0.61% in 2014. According to the 2014 Pew Forum on Religion & Public Life survey, roughly 1% of Granite Staters self-identify themselves most closely with the LDS Church. The LDS Church is the 6th largest denomination in New Hampshire.

== History ==
Orson Pratt and Lyman E. Johnson arrived in New Hampshire in 1832 as missionaries and stayed for 26 days and baptized 20 people.

In 2006, Bryson C. Cook was called as stake president of the Concord, New Hampshire stake.

A regional gathering including members from New Hampshire was held in 2019 with 12,000 people gathered at the DCU Center in Worcester, Massachusetts to listen to M. Russell Ballard.

== Stakes and Congregations ==
As of May 2025, New Hampshire had the following stakes and congregations:

Concord New Hampshire Stake

- Ascutney Ward (Vermont)
- Canterbury Ward
- Colebrook Branch
- Concord Ward
- Laconia Ward
- Lebanon Ward
- Manchester 1st Ward
- Plymouth Ward
- Randolph Branch
- Wolfeboro Branch

Exeter New Hampshire Stake

- Derry Ward
- Exeter Ward
- Georgetown Ward
- Portsmouth Ward
- Sanford Ward (Maine)
- Somersworth Ward

Nashua New Hampshire Stake

- Heritage Park YSA Ward (Massachusetts)
- Keene Ward
- Lowell Ward (Massachusetts)
- Merrimack Ward
- Nashua 1st Ward
- Nashua 2nd Branch (Spanish)
- Peterborough Ward

== Mission ==
- New Hampshire Manchester Mission

== See also ==
- Religion in New Hampshire
