= The Church of Jesus Christ of Latter-day Saints in Vermont =

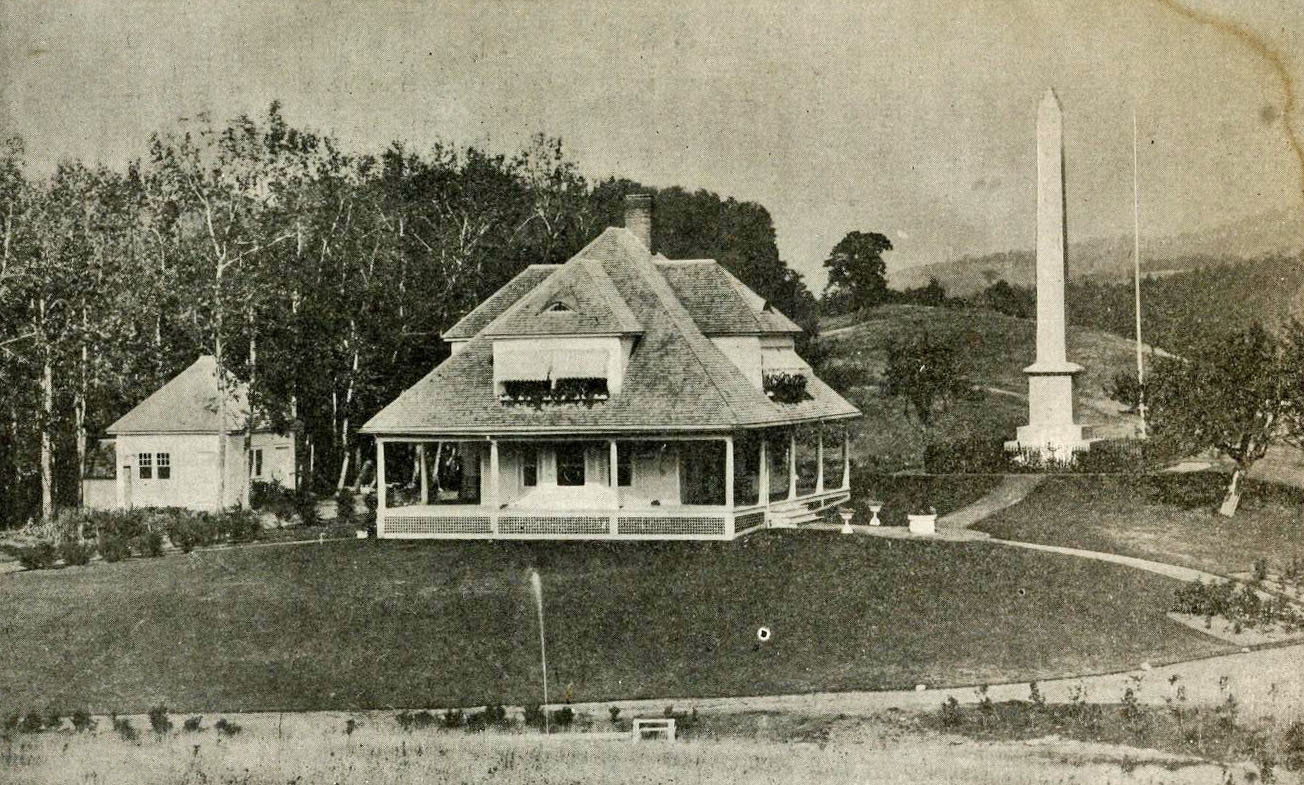
- 1907 Photograph of the birthplace of Joseph Smith, Jr in Sharon, Vermont.
- Area: US Northeast
- Members: 4,685 (2025)
- Stakes: 1
- Wards: 7
- Branches: 2
- Total Congregations: 9
- FamilySearch Centers: 8

The Church of Jesus Christ of Latter-day Saints in Vermont refers to the Church of Jesus Christ of Latter-day Saints (LDS Church) and its members in Vermont.

Official church membership as a percentage of general population was 0.74% in 2014. According to the 2014 Pew Forum on Religion & Public Life survey, less than 1% of Vermonters self-identify themselves most closely with the LDS Church. The LDS Church is the 7th largest denomination in Vermont.

== History ==
Membership in Vermont
Year	Membership
1921	60
1937	120
1983	2,024
1989*	2,900
1999	3,759
2009	4,386
2019	4,623
2025	4,685
*Membership was published as a rounded number. Source: Wendall J. Ashton; Jim M. Wall, Deseret News, various years, Church Almanac State Information: Vermont

Joseph Smith, the LDS Church founder, was born in Sharon on December 23, 1805. Other early church leaders born in Vermont include Oliver Cowdery, who was first Assistant President of the Church, as well as 5 members of the original Quorum of the Twelve Apostles, Brigham Young, Heber C. Kimball, Luke S. Johnson and Lyman E. Johnson and William Smith.

== Stake and Congregations ==
LDS Church Locations as of May 2025
Green = Stake Center and meetinghouse
Purple = meetinghouse
(FHC) = Family History Center

As of July 2026, the following congregations met in Vermont

Montpelier Vermont Stake

- Burlington Ward
- Lamoille Valley Ward
- Middlebury Ward
- Montpelier Ward
- Northeast Kingdom Ward
- Rutland Branch
- South Royalton Ward

Albany New York Stake

- Bennington Branch

Concord New Hampshire Stake

- Ascutney Ward

== Missions ==
Missionary work started shortly after the Church was organized in 1830. The Eastern States Mission, the Church's 2nd mission (behind the British Mission), was established on May 6, 1839, but discontinued in April 1850. The Eastern States Mission was re-established in January 1893.

As of 2025, most of Vermont is covered by the New Hampshire Manchester Mission, except the Bennington Branch, which is part of the New York Syracuse Mission.

== Temples ==
With exception of the Bennington Branch in southern Vermont, the state is in the Boston Massachusetts Temple District. The Bennington Branch is in the Hartford Connecticut Temple District.

100. Boston Massachusetts Temple; Official website; News & images	
Location: Announced: Groundbreaking: Dedicated: Size: Style:	Belmont, Massachusetts, United States; September 30, 1995 by Gordon B. Hinckley; June 13, 1997 by Richard G. Scott; October 1, 2000 by Gordon B. Hinckley; 69,600 sq ft (6,470 m^{2}) on a 8-acre (3.2 ha) site Classic modern, single-spire design - designed by Tsoi/Kobus & Associates and Church A&E Services

== See also ==
- The Church of Jesus Christ of Latter-day Saints membership statistics (United States)
- Vermont: Religion
