= Pittsburgh Pennsylvania Temple =

Temple of the LDS Church

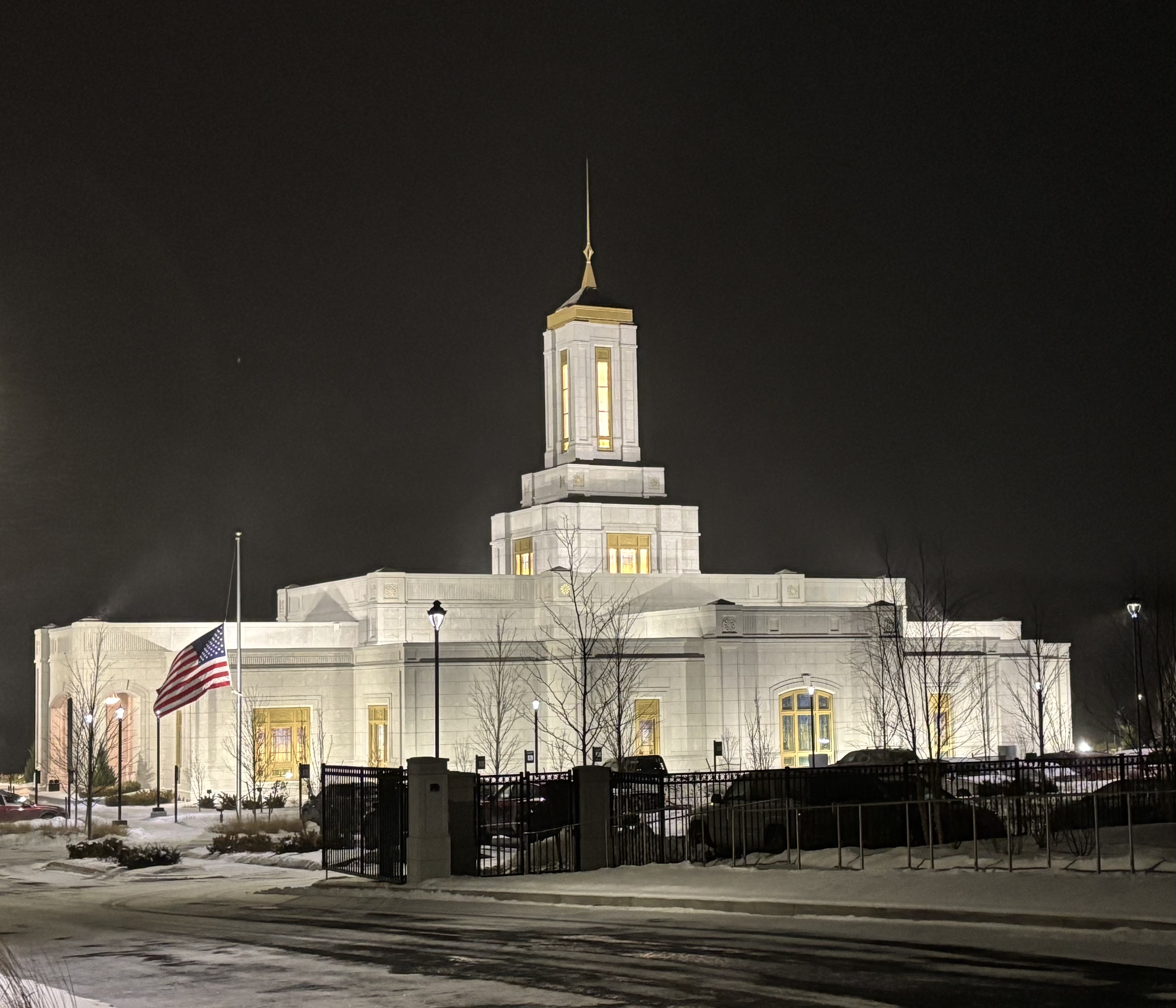
- Exterior view, January 2025
- Interactive map of Pittsburgh Pennsylvania Temple
- Number: 196
- Dedication: 15 September 2024, by Dieter F. Uchtdorf
- Site: 5.8 acres (2.3 ha)
- Floor area: 32,240 ft^{2} (2,995 m^{2})
- Official website • News & images

Church chronology
← Layton Utah Temple	Pittsburgh Pennsylvania Temple	→ Mendoza Argentina Temple

Additional information
- Announced: 5 April 2020, by Russell M. Nelson
- Groundbreaking: 21 August 2021, by Randall K. Bennett
- Open house: 15-31 August 2024
- Current president: James Martin Jindra
- Location: Cranberry Township, Pennsylvania, United States
- Coordinates: 40°41′39″N 80°08′28″W
- Baptistries: 1
- Ordinance rooms: 2
- Sealing rooms: 2

The Pittsburgh Pennsylvania Temple is a temple of the Church of Jesus Christ of Latter-day Saints (LDS Church) in Cranberry Township, Pennsylvania, a suburb of Pittsburgh. The intent to construct the temple was announced on April 5, 2020, by church president Russell M. Nelson during general conference. The temple is the church's second in the state of Pennsylvania, and the first in the western part of the state.

A groundbreaking ceremony, to signify the beginning of construction, was held on August 23, 2021, conducted by Randall K. Bennett, a church general authority. The temple was dedicated on September 15, 2024, by Dieter F. Uchtdorf.

== History ==
The temple was announced by Russell M. Nelson on April 5, 2020. On January 20, 2021, the LDS Church announced the temple would be built on the 2000 block of Powell Road in Cranberry. This is a 5.8-acre site next to an existing church meetinghouse.

Ground was broken for the temple on August 23, 2021, with Randall K. Bennett presiding. Local community leaders also attended. With construction completed in 2024, a public open house was held from August 16 to August 31. The temple was dedicated on September 15, 2024, by Dieter F. Uchtdorf.

== Design and architecture ==
The temple is on a 5.8-acre plot, with surrounding landscaping of flower gardens and grass fields.

The structure is 125 feet tall, constructed with granite cladding. The exterior has a single central spire, chosen for its symbolic significance and alignment with temple traditions.

The interior has a floral motif which uses the mountain laurel (Pennsylvania’s state flower) and the blossoms of the dogwood tree. The temple’s interior design also has patterned green and gold carpets, art glass windows, and crystal chandeliers. The temple is centered around the celestial room, which is designed to crate a spiritually uplifting environment. The temple has two ordinance rooms, two sealing rooms, and a baptistry, each designed for ceremonial use.

The design uses elements representing Latter-day Saint symbolism to provide spiritual meaning to its appearance and function. Symbolism is important to church members, one of the most important being the celestial room which represents “coming into the presence of God the Father and Jesus Christ.”

== Temple presidents ==
Temples in the Mid-Atlantic States
- = Operating
- = Under construction
- = Announced
- = Temporarily Closed
- = Historical/Efforts Suspended

The church's temples are directed by a temple president and matron, each serving for a term of three years. The president and matron oversee the administration of temple operations and provide guidance and training for both temple patrons and staff. The first temple president is James M. Jindra, with Elizabeth L. Jindra as matron.

== Reception and admittance ==
On April 15, 2024, the church announced the public open house that was held from August 16 to 31, 2024, (excluding Sundays). The completion of the temple was met with excitement from local church members. The open house was covered by local papers such as the Pittsburgh Magazine, the Pittsburgh Post-Gazette, and the Butler Eagle.

The temple was dedicated by Dieter F. Uchtdorf on September 15, 2024. Like all the church's temples, it is not used for Sunday worship services. To members of the church, temples are regarded as sacred houses of the Lord. Once dedicated, only church members with a current temple recommend can enter for worship.

== See also ==
- Comparison of temples of The Church of Jesus Christ of Latter-day Saints
- List of temples of The Church of Jesus Christ of Latter-day Saints
- List of temples of The Church of Jesus Christ of Latter-day Saints by geographic region
- Temple architecture (Latter-day Saints)
- The Church of Jesus Christ of Latter-day Saints in Pennsylvania
