= Oriental Orthodoxy in Guatemala =

Oriental Orthodoxy in Guatemala refers to adherents of Oriental Orthodox Christianity in Guatemala. Most of the Oriental Orthodox Christians in Guatemala are ethnic Maya, who are under ecclesiastical jurisdiction of the Syriac Orthodox Church of Antioch.

== History ==
Emergence of Oriental Orthodoxy in Guatemala was closely related to the events of canonical revival within particular Christian communities. By 2012, first contacts were initiated between the Renewed Ecumenical Catholic Church of Guatemala (Iglesia Católica Ecuménica Renovada en Guatemala, ICERGUA) and representatives of Syriac Orthodox Church in North America, and within a year, full communion was achieved with each other. Leaders of ICERGUA accepted theological positions of Oriental Orthodox Christianity, and ecclesiastical jurisdiction of Syriac Orthodox Patriarch Ignatius Zakka I Iwas of Antioch. Conversion process was particularly successful among indigenous Maya in Guatemala.

This revival movement was led by Eduardo Aguirre-Oestmann, a former priest of the Roman Catholic Archdiocese of Guatemala. In 2003, Aguirre formed ICERGUA as a charismatic independent catholic church. In 2006, Cardinal Rodolfo Quezada Toruño, archbishop of the Archdiocese of Guatemala, excommunicated Aguirre and adherents of his group from the Catholic Church. The archdiocese of Guatemala stated that they were excommunicated for schism, and for Aguirre distancing himself "from the communion and the norms of his priesthood" by founding the Comunión Ecuménica Santa María del Nuevo Éxodo in 2003. In 2007, Aguirre was consecrated as bishop of ICERGUA by a bishop of the Brazilian Catholic Apostolic Church at the parish church in San Juan Comalapa. ICERGUA was a member of the Worldwide Communion of Catholic Apostolic Churches.

When ICERGUA was collectively received into Syriac Orthodox Church of Antioch in 2012-2013, it was reorganized as the "Central American Archdiocese of the Syriac Orthodox Catholic Apostolic Church of Antioch" (Arquidiócesis de Centro América de la Iglesia Católica Apostólica Siro-Ortodoxa de Antioquía, ICASOAC). Popularly the archdiocese is known as the Archdiocese of Central America, the Caribbean Islands and Venezuela, headed by Archbishop Eduardo Aguirre-Oestmann.

As of November 2019, ICASOAC in its official website estimated its membership to be at 507,570, independent estimations from organizations like SCOOCH put the figures at 800,000.

It also controls the only Oriental orthodox church in the US Territory of Puerto Rico in the town of Aguada.

== See also ==
- Eastern Orthodoxy in Guatemala
- Religion in Guatemala
- Oriental Orthodox Churches
- Syriac Orthodox Church
