= Irreligion in Guatemala =

Irreligion in Guatemala is a minority of the population, as Christianity is the predominant faith in the country. Irreligion has grown in the country since the 1990s. Most Guatemalans are Christian through cultural influence, and politically the Church still has a good relationship with the government.

According to the World Values Survey, 3.6% do not believe in God. According to ARDA investigations, 15% is non-believer or atheistic. According to the national Survey Prodatos, in 2016, 11% of the population reported being non-religious. In 2002, according to nationwide surveys, 11.7% reported themselves as non-religious, whilst it was 9.5% in the metropolitan area. In other regions the percentage were substantially higher, being 15.4% in the north-west and 17.7% in Peten. By 1998-1999, the Department of Health survey found that 16% of population was irreligious.

== Separation of Church and State ==
According to the Guatemala constitution all citizens have the right to practice or not practice the religion of their choice.

== Demographics of atheism ==
Atheism is prevalent amongst the Latino population.

== See also ==
- Religion in Guatemala
