= Freiberg Germany Temple =

LDS temple in Freiberg, Saxony, Germany

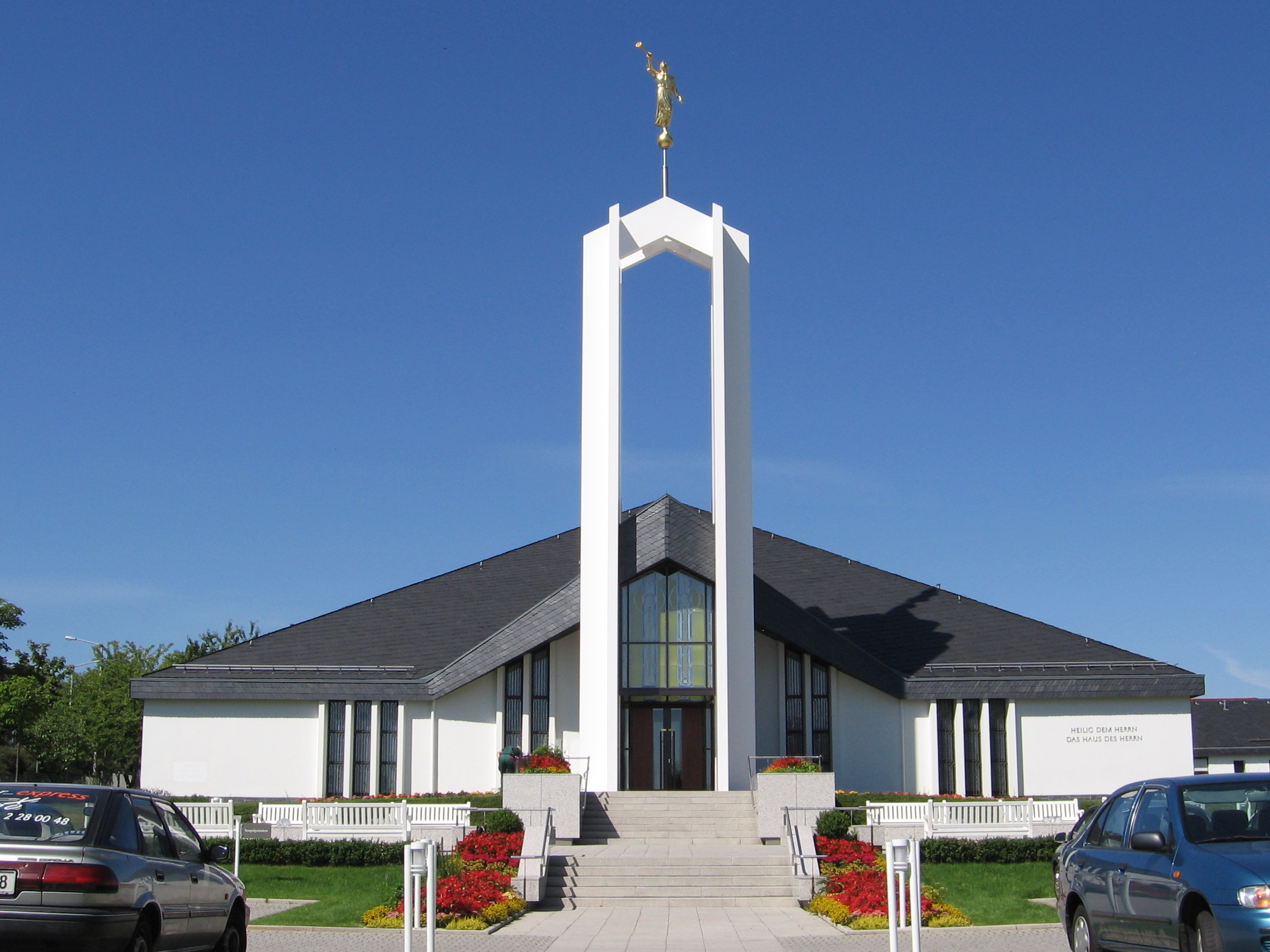
- Interactive map of Freiberg Germany Temple
- Number: 33
- Dedication: 29 June 1985, by Gordon B. Hinckley
- Site: 3.58 acres (1.45 ha)
- Floor area: 21,500 ft^{2} (2,000 m^{2})
- Official website • News & images

Church chronology
← Guatemala City Guatemala Temple	Freiberg Germany Temple	→ Stockholm Sweden Temple

Additional information
- Announced: 9 October 1982, by Spencer W. Kimball
- Groundbreaking: 23 April 1983, by Thomas S. Monson
- Open house: 3–15 June 1985; 17–31 August 2002; 12–27 August 2016
- Rededicated: 7 September 2002, by Gordon B. Hinckley; 4 September 2016, by Dieter F. Uchtdorf
- Current president: Holger Rakow
- Designed by: Emil B. Fetzer and Rolf Metzner
- Location: Freiberg, Germany
- Coordinates: 50°55′20.33399″N 13°19′21.14759″E
- Exterior finish: White German stucco plastered over 24-inch thick brick walls and a blue gray slate stone slab roof
- Design: Modern, single-spire design with German influence and use of Gothic-style arches
- Baptistries: 1
- Ordinance rooms: 2 (stationary)
- Sealing rooms: 2
- Clothing rental: Yes
- Notes: Originally without an angel Moroni statue, one was installed as part of the 2001–2002 renovations. It is the only temple ever to have been located behind the Iron Curtain.

The Freiberg Germany Temple (formerly the Freiberg GDR Temple) is a temple of the Church of Jesus Christ of Latter-day Saints (LDS Church), located in Freiberg, Saxony, Germany. The church announced the temple in October 1982, ground was broken for construction on April 23, 1983, and the temple was dedicated on June 29 and June 30, 1985.

== Background ==
Built in what was then the German Democratic Republic, the Freiberg Germany Temple was the first LDS temple in a communist state. After the Bern Switzerland Temple was dedicated in 1955, Latter-day Saints throughout Europe visited it for the Endowment and other temple rites. After 1957, East German governmental restrictions on foreign travel prevented the country's Latter-day Saints—about 5,000 in 1970—from easily obtaining visas to travel to the temple. Church members repeatedly applied for visas, were rejected, then applied again. An attempt in the early 1970s by Henry Burkhardt, the de jure head of the church in East Germany, to present the government with a list of 300 church members interested in visiting the temple almost led to his arrest.

The LDS Church appointed Burkhardt as president of the Germany Dresden Mission in 1969 to comply with a new law requiring churches to be led by East Germans. In the 1970s his role gave Burkhardt access to visas to travel to LDS general conferences in Salt Lake City, Utah. Obtaining the visas required him to meet often with East German government officials, whom church leaders encouraged Burkhardt to build relationships with despite his reluctance. In 1973 and/or 1978, H. Burke Peterson of the Presiding Bishopric, suggested to Burkhardt that the church build an endowment house in East Germany as an alternative to a temple.

== Design ==
In 1978, the East German government unexpectedly suggested building an LDS temple within the country. Doing so would reduce visa requests, and was part of a new government policy to cooperate with churches in hopes of obtaining hard currency through construction. The church emphasized temples' unantastbar ("sanctity") nature to the government, but initially planned for a chapel and an endowment house in one building, so that the latter could be used with the chapel if desecrated. The church intended to locate the building in Karl-Marx-Stadt, a longtime center of Communist ideology, as its LDS congregation needed a new chapel. In 1980 the local government rejected a new chapel within the city despite the national government's support, and instead assigned the building to Freiberg, about 20 miles (32 km) away.

The choice of the small town instead of a larger city like Leipzig or Dresden surprised members. Although disappointed at first, Burkhardt and church leaders in Utah came to see the Freiberg location as superior. By April 1981, city officials' welcoming of the project ahead of the forthcoming 800th anniversary of Freiberg's founding in 1986 encouraged the church to plan for a separate chapel and temple. In 1982 the government also permitted the church to acquire a one-acre (4,000 m^{2}) hillside site instead of the normal long-term lease. The church announced the forthcoming Freiberg Germany Temple in October 1982, and Thomas S. Monson, of the Quorum of the Twelve Apostles, presided over the groundbreaking on 23 April 1983. The plans did not include an angel Moroni and no request to the government for one was made, although it would likely have permitted a statue if asked.

== Construction ==
The government aided in speeding up paperwork and construction for the temple, in part to help commemorate the anniversary of Freiberg's founding; by contrast, although the Frankfurt Germany Temple was announced 1½ years before Freiberg, it was not finished until two years after Freiberg. The church also received approval to tap the new Trans-Siberian Pipeline, which passed near the temple, to heat the buildings with natural gas instead of brown coal, which would have required a large, dirty coal plant on the site. The construction used triple glazing and other advanced methods unusual for East Germany, and despite restrictions on imported materials, architects were able to obtain three high-quality Czech crystal chandeliers for the Celestial and sealing rooms at the Leipzig Trade Fair. Because the church was unsure of how long the temple's sacredness would remain intact, however, the bulk of the temple's materials were of "average" or "mediocre" quality, and steps were not taken to ease future expansion. Unlike the contemporaneous Stockholm and Frankfurt temples, for example, the Freiberg temple did not include an air conditioning system despite its availability in East Germany, causing hundreds to faint during temple rites.

== Dedication ==
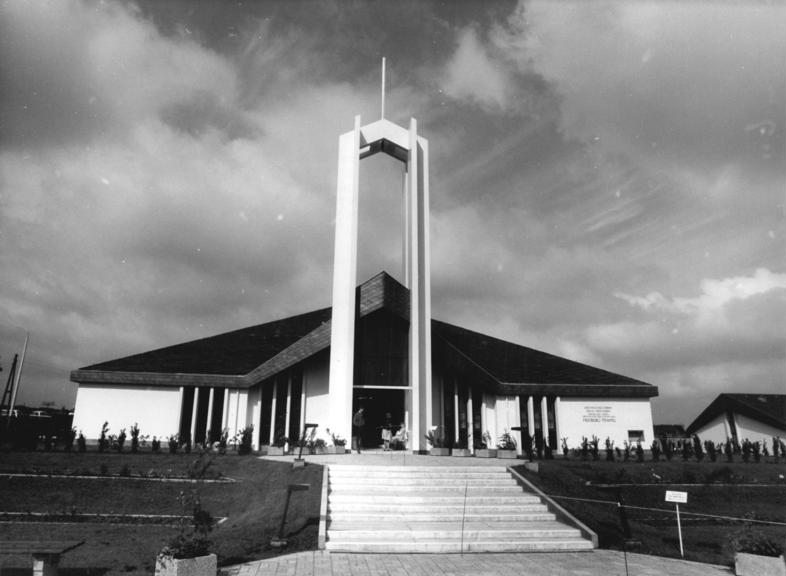
The temple at the time of its dedication in June 1985 (without the Moroni statue)

The temple was open to the public for tours June 3–15, 1985. Those who attended the tours of the 7,840-square-foot (728 m^{2}) temple were able to see the exterior and its German-influenced design with gothic style arches, as well as the interior with its one ordinance room and two sealing rooms. About 90,000 people waited up to seven hours to tour the temple during the open house, despite 21 Stasi agents monitoring and photographing all visitors. The temple was dedicated in seven sessions on June 29–30, 1985, by Gordon B. Hinckley of the First Presidency, and Burkhardt became its first president.

== East German government ==
During its existence the German Democratic Republic spied on every LDS congregation's meetings, and Burkhardt had at least three Stasi agents monitoring him at all times. The Stasi and other East German government institutions viewed the church as connected to "the right wing of American conservatism...ruling circles within the American government...and the American secret service." Hinckley expressed the fear during the dedication that the temple might soon become a museum, and during its first few weeks of operation church members who had not visited a temple before received priority in appointments.

As East Germany sought in the 1980s to improve its image abroad, however, the Latter-day Saints' alleged ties to the United States government and other Western powers worked in the church's favor. The Stasi's close monitoring of East German members over the years gave the church credibility, as the government came to see Latter-day Saints as citizens of good character who, in keeping with the 12th Article of Faith, did not conspire against the nation. Accordingly, it agreed that no one without a recommend would enter the temple after the dedication, and fears of electronic surveillance proved groundless.

== Expansion and renovation ==
After the temple's dedication, the grounds—nicknamed "Temple Square" referencing the Utah church center of the same name—became a popular site for local non-LDS newlyweds' wedding photos. Latter-day Saints popularly attribute a hastened fall of the communist regime, and the Freiberg area's prosperity in relatively poor eastern Germany, to the temple's presence and influence on the country. After the reunification of Germany on October 3, 1990, the Freiberg and Frankfurt temples made it the second country, after Canada, outside of the United States to have more than one.

The temple received badly needed air conditioning in 1994. Renovations began in 2001 which nearly doubled the square footage to 14,125 square feet (1,312.3 m^{2}) and added 12 oxen to support the baptismal font, a waiting room for those not able to enter the temple, a matron and brides room, as well as an office for the temple president. On December 20, 2001, an angel Moroni statue was placed on top of the temple. A second open house was held August 17–31, 2002. After renovations, Gordon B. Hinckley rededicated the temple on September 7, 2002. Although when dedicated the temple was originally open only to East German church members, it now also serves those in Poland, the Czech Republic, Slovakia, and Hungary, and, before the Kyiv Ukraine Temple's 2010 dedication, Russia and Ukraine.

Beginning February 9, 2015, the temple closed for renovations that were originally anticipated to take approximately 15 months. On January 21, 2016, the church announced that a public open house would be held from Friday, August 12, 2016, through Saturday, August 27, 2016, excluding Sundays. The temple was rededicated on Sunday, September 4, 2016, by Dieter F. Uchtdorf.

== See also ==
- Comparison of temples of The Church of Jesus Christ of Latter-day Saints
- List of temples of The Church of Jesus Christ of Latter-day Saints
- List of temples of The Church of Jesus Christ of Latter-day Saints by geographic region
- Temple architecture (Latter-day Saints)
- The Church of Jesus Christ of Latter-day Saints in Germany
