= Religion in Guatemala =

Religion in Guatemala (Latinobarómetro 2024)
1. Protestantism (40%)
2. Catholicism (39%)
3. Other Christian (1%)
4. Other (1%)
5. None (19%)

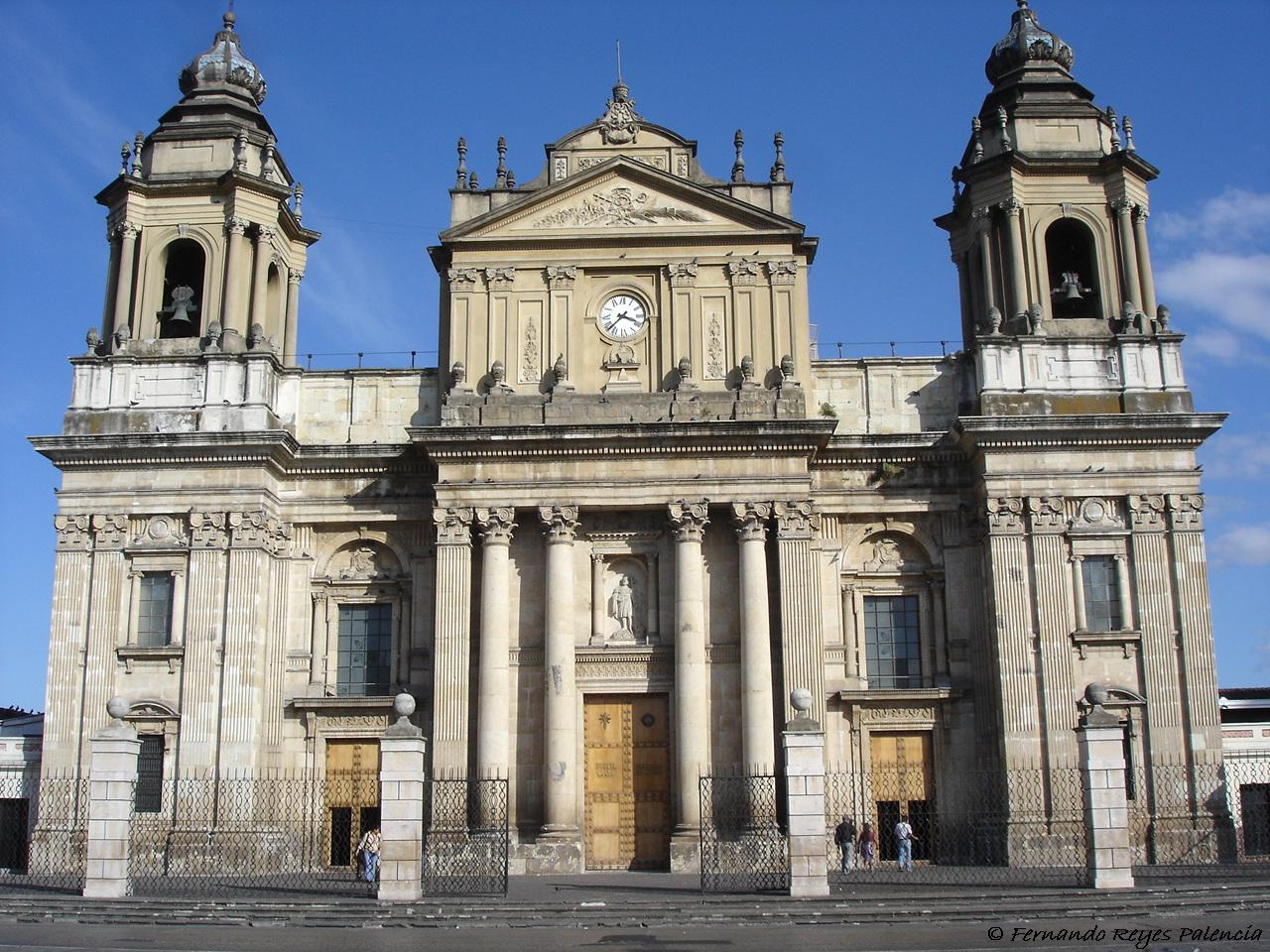
The Metropolitan Cathedral of St. James in Guatemala city.

Christianity has dominated Guatemalan society since its Spanish colonial rule, but the nature of Christian practice in the country has changed in recent decades.

Catholicism was the official religion in Guatemala during the colonial era and currently has a special status under the constitution; though its membership has declined substantially over the last half-century.

== Overview ==
According to a Cid-Gallup survey in November 2001, 55% of Guatemalans were Catholic and 29.9% were Protestant. A 2016 survey found that Catholics accounted for 45% of the Guatemalan population. The number of Pentecostals (called Evangélicos in Latin America), Eastern Orthodox and Oriental Orthodox have increased in recent decades. About 42% of Guatemalans are Protestant, chiefly independent Evangelicals or Pentecostals. The Eastern Orthodox Church and Oriental Orthodoxy also claim rapid growth, especially among the indigenous Maya peoples.

Evangelicalism is projected to surpass Catholicism as the dominant religion in Guatemala by 2030.

== Religious freedom ==
The constitution of Guatemala establishes the freedom of religion. While it is not a state religion, the Catholic Church is recognized as "a distinct legal personality" that receives certain privileges.

According to the constitution, no member of the clergy of any religion may serve as president, vice president, government minister, or as a judge.

Registration for religious groups is not required, but provides access to property purchase and tax exemptions.

The constitution includes a commitment to protect the rights of indigenous Maya groups to practice their religion. Mayan religious groups are allowed to use historical sites on government-owned property for ceremonies. However, representatives of Mayan groups have complained that their access is limited and subject to other obstacles, such as being required to pay fees.

Public schools may choose to offer religious instruction, but there is no national framework for such classes. Private religious schools are allowed to operate as well.

== Christianity ==
=== Catholicism ===
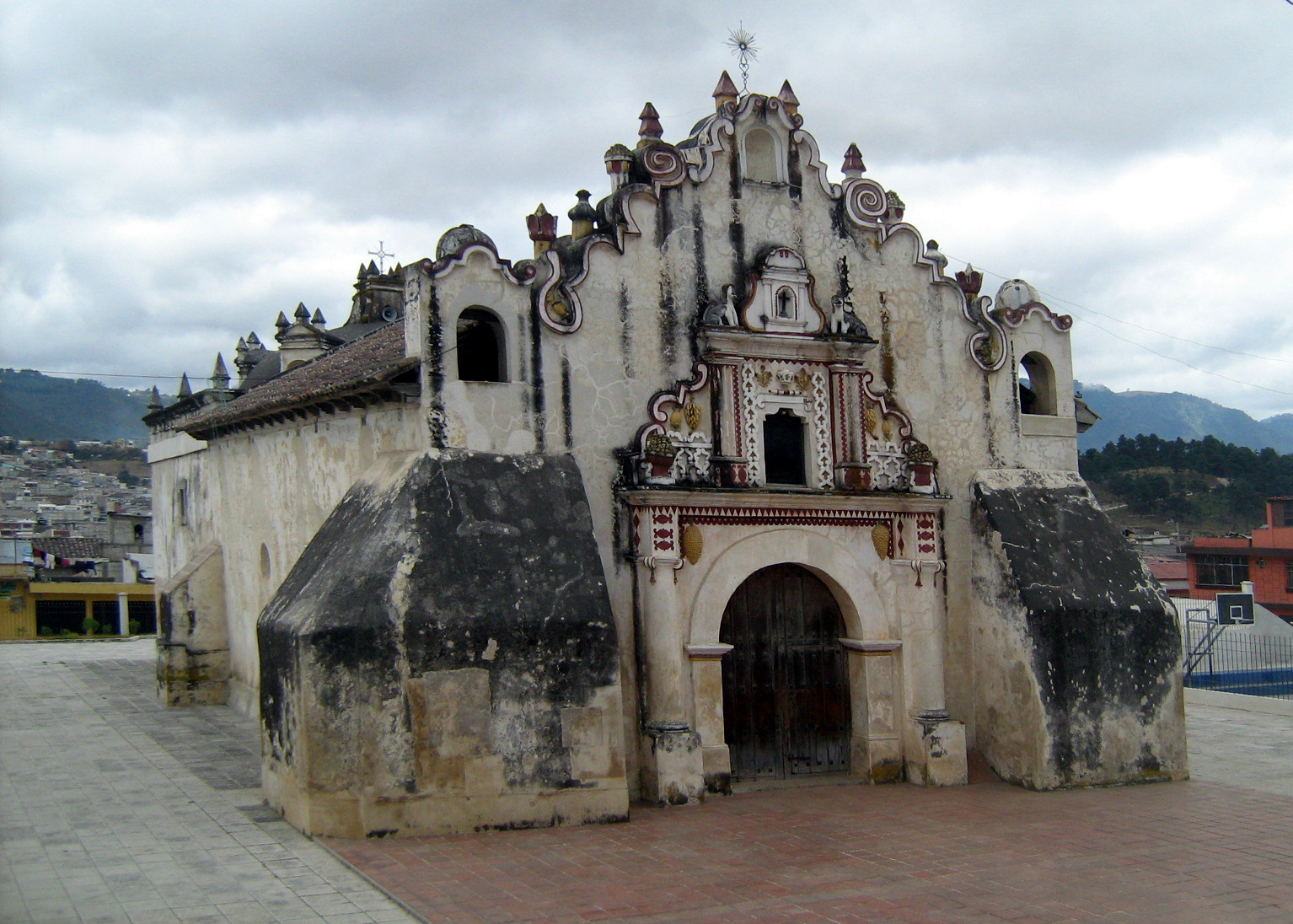
Early colonial church in Salcajá

Catholicism was the established religion during the colonial era (1519–1821) and reestablished under the Concordat of 1854 until the fall of Vicente Cerna y Cerna in 1871. It is common for relevant Mayan practices to be incorporated into Catholic ceremonies and worship when they are sympathetic to the meaning of Catholic belief a phenomenon known as inculturation. Within this Catholic Church, there are also a large number of Charismatic Catholics, part of the global Catholic Charismatic Renewal.

=== Protestantism ===
Current estimates of the primarily evangelical Protestant population of Guatemala are around 40 percent, making it one of the most Protestant countries in Latin America. Most of these Protestants are Pentecostals. The first Protestant missionary, Frederick Crowe, arrived in Guatemala in 1843, but Conservative President Rafael Carrera expelled him in 1845. Protestant missionaries re-entered the country in 1882 under the patronage of Liberal President Justo Rufino Barrios. These Northern Presbyterian missionaries opened the first permanent Protestant church in the country in Guatemala City, which still exists one block behind the presidential palace in zone 1 of Guatemala City.

Protestants remained a small portion of the population until the late-twentieth century, when various Protestant groups experienced a demographic boom that coincided with the increasing violence of the Guatemalan Civil War. Three Guatemalan heads of state, General Efraín Ríos Montt, who in 2013 was found guilty of genocide and crimes against humanity, Jorge Serrano Elías, and Jimmy Morales, have been practicing Protestants. Brazil also had two Protestant heads of state, the Presbyterian, called Café Filho, and the Lutheran Ernesto Geisel. Large portions of the nation's Mayan population are Protestants, especially in the northern highlands.

Guatemala is home to the most Quakers in Central America. In 2017, there were 19,830 Quakers in the country.

=== Oriental Orthodoxy ===
The Syriac Orthodox Archdiocese of Central America is a jurisdiction of the Syriac Orthodox Church based primarily in Guatemala. It originated in 2003, when Eduardo Aguirre Oestmann, a former priest of the Roman Catholic Church, led a charismatic renewal movement that separated from the Catholic Church in search of a more localized and apostolic expression of Christianity. The movement was subsequently received into the Syriac Orthodox Church, and Oestmann was consecrated as Archbishop Mor Yacoub Eduardo.

The archdiocese is composed largely of indigenous Maya communities, particularly in rural regions such as Huehuetenango and El Quiché. It has expanded to include numerous parishes across Central America, including three dioceses within Guatemala. Estimates of its membership exceed 500,000.

The archdiocese follows the liturgical and spiritual traditions of the Syriac Orthodox Church, including the use of the Syriac language in worship. These practices are often expressed alongside local cultural elements, resulting in a distinctive synthesis of Syriac Christian tradition and indigenous Maya religious and cultural forms.

=== Eastern Orthodoxy ===
According to a Guatemalan Orthodox monastery, Orthodox Christianity arrived in Guatemala at the end of the 19th century and beginning of the 20th century with immigrants from Lebanon, Russia, and Greece. In the 1980s two Catholic women, Mother Ines and Mother Maria, converted to Orthodox Christianity and established a monastery. In 1992 they were received into the Antiochian Patriarchate and in 1995 the Catholic Apostolic Orthodox Antiochian Church in Guatemala was formally established. The state orphanage of Hogar Rafael Ayau, established in 1857, was privatized and transferred to their care in 1996.

In 2010 a religious group which had begun as a Catholic movement under a priest, Andrés de Jesús Girón (died 2014, also known as Andrew Giron), was received into the Eastern Orthodox Church by the Ecumenical Patriarchate of Constantinople and placed under the Greek Orthodox Metropolis of Mexico.

=== The Church of Jesus Christ of Latter-day Saints ===
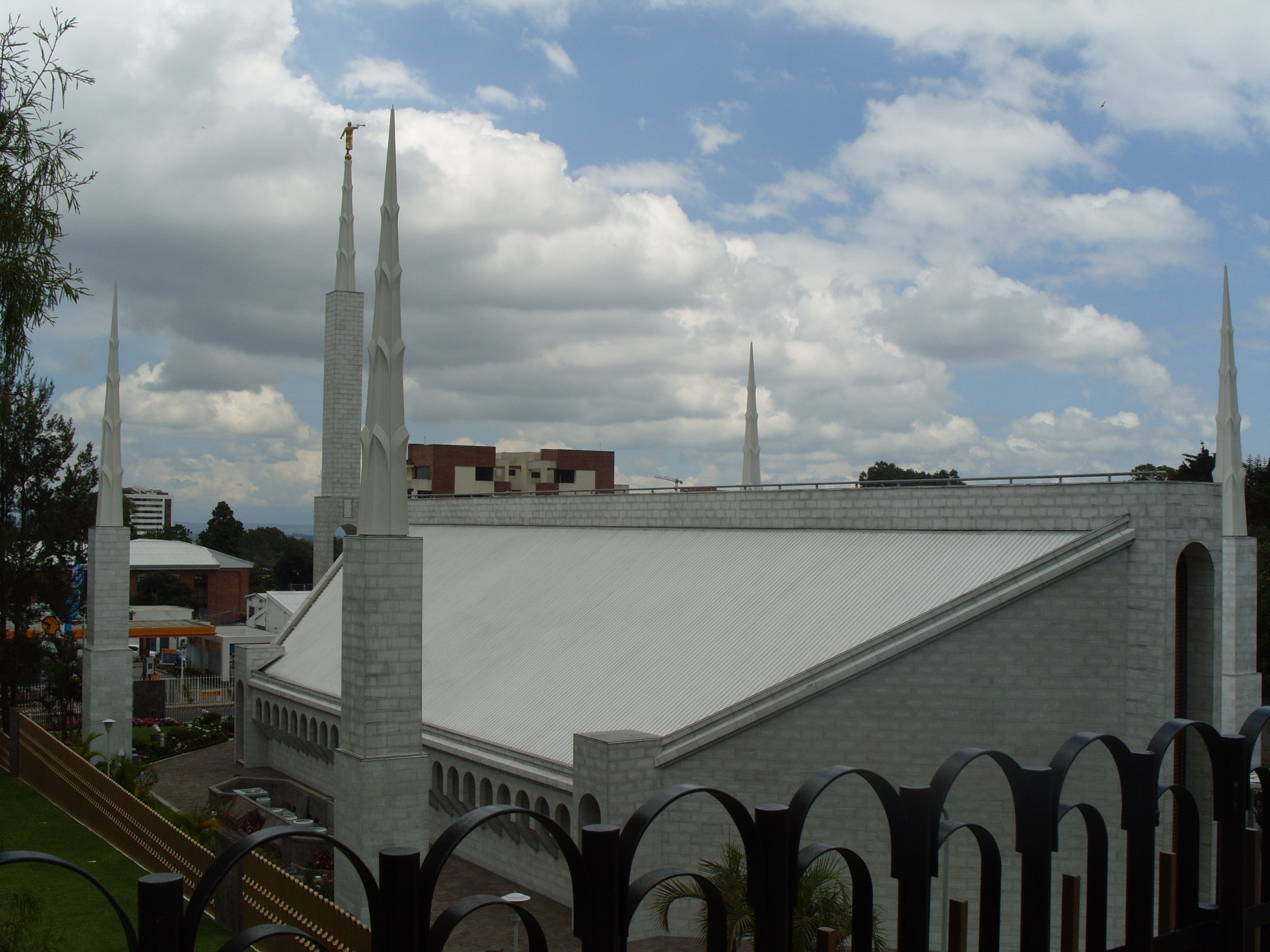
The Mormon Guatemala City Temple.

The Church of Jesus Christ of Latter-day Saints in Guatemala claims over 255,000 members in 421 congregations in Guatemala which, if accurate, accounts for approximately 1.6% of Guatemala's estimated population in 2015. The first member of the LDS Church in Guatemala was baptized in 1948. Membership grew to a claimed 10,000 by 1966, and 18 years later, when the Guatemala City Temple was dedicated in 1984, membership had risen to 40,000.

By 1998 membership had grown to 164,000. A second temple, Quetzaltenango Guatemala Temple, was dedicated in December 2011. However the church has also reported declining or stagnant numbers in the capital, Guatemala City.

== Others ==
There are also small communities of Buddhists at around 9,000 to 12,000, Jews estimated between 1,200 and 2,000, Muslims at 1,200 and members of other faiths. Nearly 20,000 Baháʼí people and more than 300,000 Spiritualists practitioners, most of them double affiliated or syncretic. Around 40,000 to 100,000 persons are full believers in Mayan religion without syncretism.

== Irreligion ==
Irreligion refers to people with no religious affiliation, atheists and agnostics. According to different estimations, the total number of non-religious people in Guatemala is more than 10% of the population. In 2001 they represented 13% or 17% (CBN Poll's/Department of Health & Survey) which changed to 11% by 2016 and 42% being Protestant up from 30% since 14 years ago. Today, Pew Research Center only estimates that less than 5% of the country is irreligious, but they found that nearly 16% of Guatemalans were non-religious in 1999.

== See also ==
- Catholic Church in Guatemala
- Eastern Orthodoxy in Guatemala
- Oriental Orthodoxy in Guatemala
- Anglican Church in Central America
- History of the Jews in Guatemala
- Islam in Guatemala
- Maya religion
- Mesoamerican religion
