= Cobán Guatemala Temple =

- Interactive map of Cobán Guatemala Temple
- Number: 193
- Dedication: 9 June 2024, by Dale G. Renlund
- Site: 2.1 acres (0.85 ha)
- Floor area: 8,772 ft^{2} (814.9 m^{2})
- Official website • News & images

Church chronology
← Taylorsville Utah Temple	Cobán Guatemala Temple	→ Salta Argentina Temple

Additional information
- Announced: 5 October 2019, by Russell M. Nelson
- Groundbreaking: 14 November 2020, by Brian K. Taylor
- Open house: April 25 to May 11, 2024
- Current president: Felix Rosales Choc
- Location: Cobán, Guatemala
- Coordinates: 15°27′32″N 90°21′55″W
- Baptistries: 1
- Ordinance rooms: 1 (stationary)
- Sealing rooms: 1

The Cobán Guatemala Temple is a temple of the Church of Jesus Christ of Latter-day Saints (LDS Church) in Cobán's 2nd ward. The intent to build the temple was announced on October 5, 2019, by church president Russell M. Nelson, during general conference. It is Guatemala's third temple, following the Guatemala City Guatemala and Quetzaltenango Guatemala temples.

The temple is located on a 5.4-acre site, adjacent to an existing meetinghouse. It is one-story tall and has about 8,800 square feet. The site also includes a patron housing facility and a meetinghouse.

The temple has an attached end tower and uses a Spanish Colonial architectural influence. A groundbreaking ceremony, to signify beginning of construction, was held on November 14, 2020, with Brian K. Taylor, a general authority and president of the LDS Church's Central America Area, presiding. The temple was dedicated by Dale G. Renlund on June 9, 2024.

== History ==
The temple was announced by Russell M. Nelson on October 5, 2019, during the general women's session of the October 2019 general conference.

On May 25, 2020, the church announced that the temple would be constructed on a 5.4-acre property located adjacent to 4a. Avenida 4-48 Zona 8, Barrio Bella Vista, in Cobán, Guatemala. The preliminary plans called for a one-story structure of more than 8,800 square feet.

On September 22, 2020, it was announced that ground would be broken for the temple in November 2020. The groundbreaking ceremony occurred on November 14, 2020, with Brian K. Taylor presiding and local church members and community leaders attending.

Following completion, a public open house was held from April 25–May 11, 2024. The temple was dedicated on June 9, 2024, by Dale G. Renlund of the Quorum of the Twelve Apostles.

== Design and architecture ==
The building has a Spanish Colonial style, together with traditional Latter-day Saint temple design. The temple sits on a 2.1-acre plot, and the landscaping around the temple features palm trees and grass fields. A meetinghouse and temple patron housing are also located on the site.

The structure is 80 feet tall and has one story, constructed with concrete, painted hand-troweled stucco, and granite. The exterior has an attached end tower.

The interior design motifs use patterns typical of Cobán area textiles. It also has decorative wool rugs and art glass windows, both of which are based on the geometric textile motifs. The temple includes one instruction room, one sealing room, and a baptistry, each arranged for ceremonial use.

The design uses symbolic elements representing the history and culture of the Cobán region, providing deeper spiritual meaning to the temple's appearance and function. Symbolism is important to church members and includes the Spanish Colonial architectural style, which is common to religious and government buildings in the area, as well as the textile-inspired design motifs used throughout the temple's interior.

== Temple presidents ==
The church's temples are directed by a temple president and matron, each serving for a term of three years. The president and matron oversee the administration of temple operations and provide guidance and training for both temple patrons and staff. Since its 2024 dedication, the president and matron of the Cobán Guatemala Temple are Felix R. Choc and Violeta E. de Rosales.

== Admittance ==
Prior to the temple's dedication, a public open house was held from April 25–May 11, 2024 (excluding Sundays). The temple was dedicated during two sessions by Dale G. Renlund on June 9, 2024.

Like all the church's temples, it is not used for Sunday worship services. To members of the church, temples are regarded as sacred houses of the Lord. Once dedicated, only church members with a current temple recommend can enter for worship.

== See also ==

Temples in and near Guatemala
= Operating
= Under construction
= Announced
= Temporarily Closed

- List of temples of The Church of Jesus Christ of Latter-day Saints
- The Church of Jesus Christ of Latter-day Saints in Guatemala
