= Taipei Taiwan Temple =

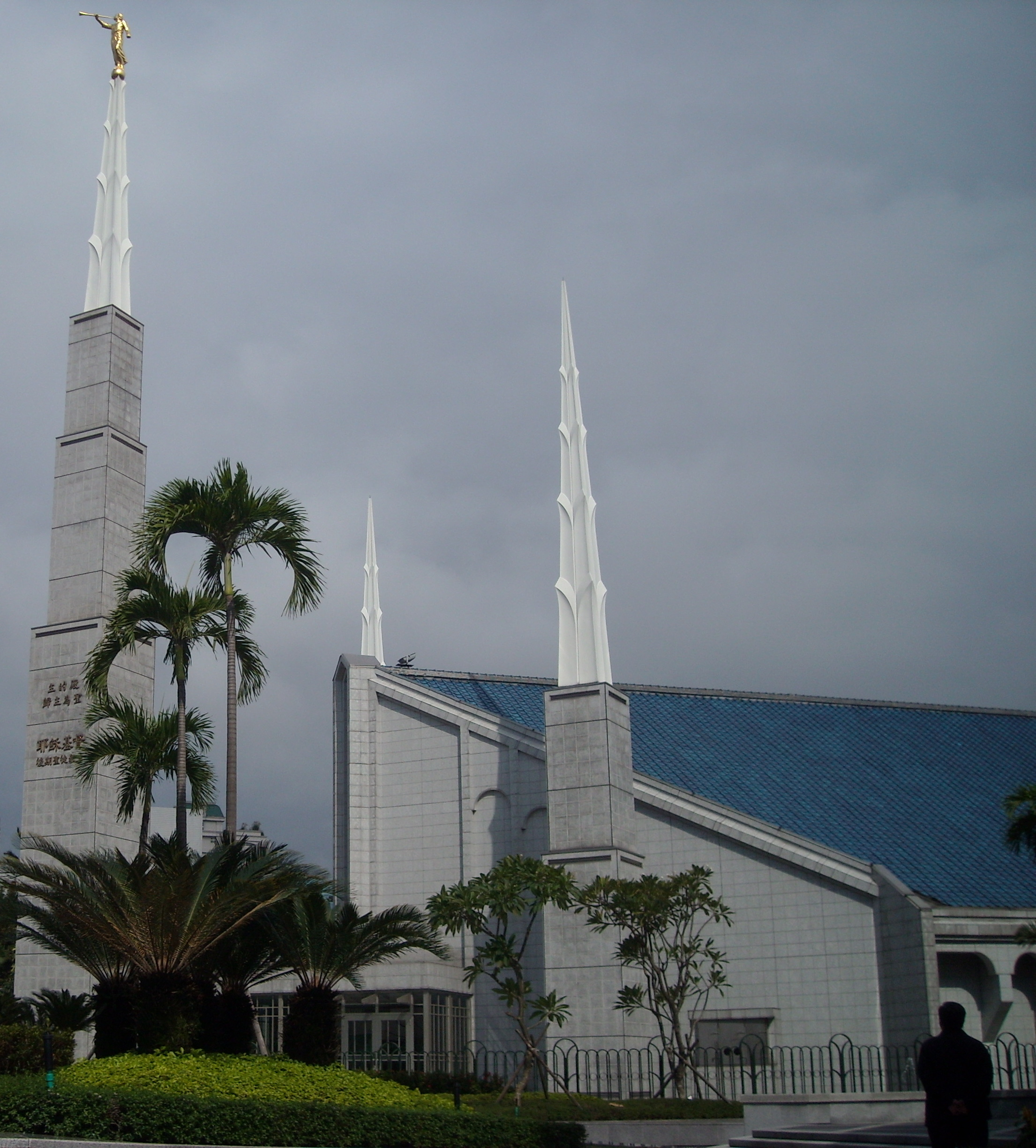
- Taipei Taiwan Temple
- Interactive map of Taipei Taiwan Temple
- Number: 31
- Dedication: 17 November 1984, by Gordon B. Hinckley
- Site: 0.5 acres (0.20 ha)
- Floor area: 9,945 ft^{2} (923.9 m^{2})
- Height: 126 ft (38 m)
- Official website • News & images

Church chronology
← Dallas Texas Temple	Taipei Taiwan Temple	→ Guatemala City Guatemala Temple

Additional information
- Announced: 31 March 1982, by Spencer W. Kimball
- Groundbreaking: 27 August 1982, by Gordon B. Hinckley
- Open house: 30 October – 10 November 1984
- Current president: Tsai, Wen Fang
- Designed by: Church A&E Services with Philip fei & Associations
- Location: Taipei, Taiwan
- Coordinates: 25°1′52.95719″N 121°31′40.05840″E
- Exterior finish: White ceramic tile
- Design: Modern adaptation of six-spire design
- Baptistries: 1
- Ordinance rooms: 4 (stationary)
- Sealing rooms: 3
- Clothing rental: Yes

The Taipei Taiwan Temple (Chinese: 臺灣臺北聖殿; pinyin: Táiwān Táiběi Shèngdiàn) is the 31st operating temple of the Church of Jesus Christ of Latter-day Saints, and is located in Taipei City, Taiwan. It was announced on March 31, 1982 by Gordon B. Hinckley (then a counselor in the First Presidency), along with those to be built in Boise, Denver, and Guayaquil. It was built on a 0.48-acre church-owned parcel at 256 Ai Kuo East Road. The temple was previously the site of a prison and then a chapel, ground for the temple was broken on August 26, 1982. Following construction, more than 16,000 visitors attended its public open house. With five sessions held, it was dedicated on November 17–18, 1984.

Architecturally, it is part of the church’s six-spire series, designed by the church’s architectural division, in collaboration with Philip Fei & Associates (Taipei). The building's exterior has white ceramic tile with a blue-tiled roof, with the tallest spire being 126 feet, with a statue of the angel Moroni on its top. It has four ordinance rooms, three sealing rooms, and a baptistry. Chinese inscriptions reading “House of the Lord” and “Holiness to the Lord” appear on the tower, and the site has trees, fountains, and terraced landscaping. The temple was nominated for an “outstanding building of the year” award, though it was ineligible because it is not open to the public after dedication.

Community interactions were notable during construction and opening: officials managed permitting and neighborhood concerns in a dense civic district; the Apostolic Nuncio, Monsignor Giglio, initially objected to night work before becoming an attentive observer; and dedication services proceeded during an approaching typhoon.

== History ==
The Taipei Taiwan Temple was announced on March 31, 1982, by Gordon B. Hinckley (then a counselor in the First Presidency) during a press conference. It was one of four new temple locations announced that day, along with Boise, Idaho; Denver, Colorado; and Guayaquil, Ecuador.

The temple was constructed on church-owned property at 256 Ai Kuo East Road. The building had earlier been used as a prison and was later a Latter-day Saint chapel. The lot is 0.48 acres (0.19 ha), with the temple being 178 by 72 feet and having a floor area of 9,945 square feet (924 m²).

Local members contributed funds toward the temple’s construction. The site eventually grew to include the temple, a combined stake center, and a seven-story church administration building, alongside the island’s first Latter-day Saint chapel.

A groundbreaking ceremony was held on August 26, 1982, with Hinckley presiding and Marion D. Hanks participating. Approximately 1,500 members attended, and one member attending recalled wearing his scout uniform. Several challenges occurred during construction; including getting permits from city officials, who had taken offense at the church's request, and a demonstration at the temple gate during the open house.

During excavation, local police stopped construction because of the building being around government buildings and two branches of universities. Due to this, the construction crew only used their heavy equipment between 11:00pm–5:00am. The site for the temple is across the street from Rome's Vatican Nuncio, and the Catholic Nuncio, Monsignor Giglio, complained to the police about his sleep being disturbed. Giglio was taken by Paul Hyer to the top of the nearby administration building, explained the limitations, and said that it would be completed soon, and that it would stop bothering him. This satisfied Giglio, and he “became one of our most ardent fans watching the construction”, watching the continued construction from his second story balcony with an umbrella, even during the rainy season.

A public open house took place from October 30 to November 10, 1984, drawing more than 16,000 visitors, including government officials and community leaders on the first day. Members in Taiwan prepared spiritually through extensive family history work, submitting nearly 10,000 names, of which 9,100 were provided by one member, Hu Chou Yue-ying.

The temple was dedicated on November 17–18, 1984, in five sessions, by Gordon B. Hinckley, then second counselor in the First Presidency. About 2,575 church members from Taiwan attended the sessions. On the second day, a typhoon approached the island, yet members stood in the rain waiting to participate.

== Design and architecture ==
The temple is one of the church’s six-spire series of temples, designed by the church’s architectural division, in collaboration with Philip Fei & Associates (Taipei). The design with the six detached spires surrounding a central structure, is like others built in the 1980s in Lima, Peru; Stockholm, Sweden; and Manila, Philippines. The temple was nominated for an award for “outstanding building of the year”, but did not receive the award due to it not being open to the public. Hyer explained that this was because the temple was not meant for public tours, but that the function of the building is instead “to endow, to prepare, and to empower a covenant people who will take the gospel to all of China.”

Located in central Taipei, the temple is on a 0.48-acre urban site that is part of a broader church complex. The exterior has white ceramic tile, with a blue-tiled roof, with the angel Moroni statue on the tallest spire. The temple has four ordinance rooms, three sealing rooms, and a baptistry.

=== Symbols ===
Chinese characters for “House of the Lord” and “Holiness to the Lord” are inscribed on the tower. The angel Moroni statue symbolizing the restoration of the gospel of Jesus Christ. At its dedication, Gordon B. Hinckley said that although the temple was once built on the site of a prison, “this house (would) open the prison doors of the veil of death,” and that there was no place where a temple has been built where so few were eligible to use it, in part due to only about 500 temple recommend holders, and the impetus to “do the work of millions”, in regards to temple ordinances for ancestors.

== See also ==
- Comparison of temples of The Church of Jesus Christ of Latter-day Saints
- List of temples of The Church of Jesus Christ of Latter-day Saints
- List of temples of The Church of Jesus Christ of Latter-day Saints by geographic region
- Temple architecture (Latter-day Saints)
- The Church of Jesus Christ of Latter-day Saints in Taiwan
