= The Church of Jesus Christ of Latter-day Saints in Guatemala =

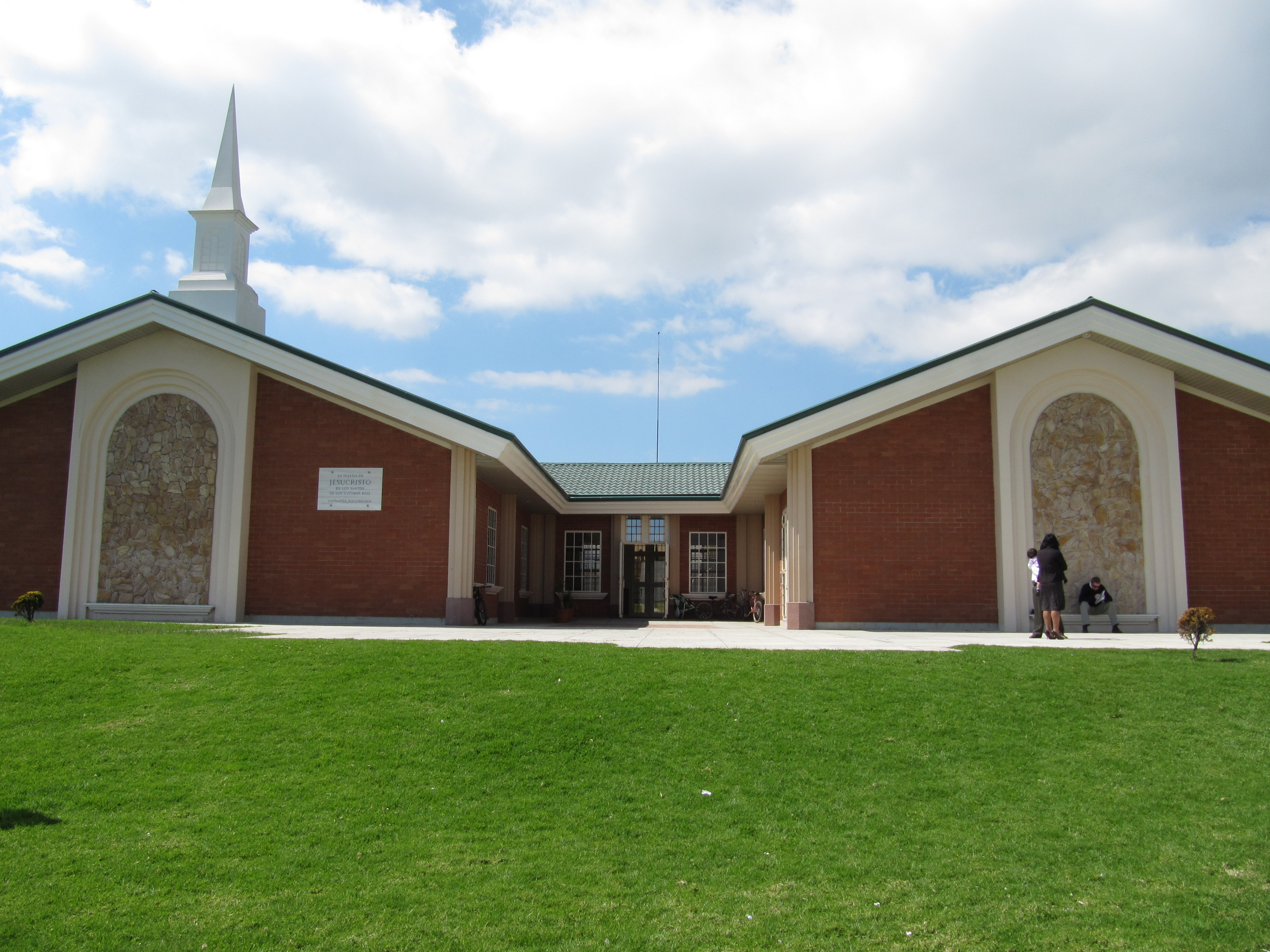
- An LDS meetinghouse in Guatemala
- Area: Central America
- Members: 297,143 (2025)
- Stakes: 51
- Districts: 10
- Wards: 296
- Branches: 145
- Total congregations: 441
- Missions: 7
- Temples: 3 operating; 2 under construction; 1 announced; 6 total
- FamilySearch Centers: 145

The Church of Jesus Christ of Latter-day Saints in Guatemala refers to the Church of Jesus Christ of Latter-day Saints (LDS Church) and its members in Guatemala. The first convert in Guatemala was baptized in 1948. As of December 31, 2025, there were 297,143 members in 441 congregations in Guatemala. Guatemala ranks as having the 4th most members of the LDS Church in North America and 8th worldwide.

== History ==
Membership in Guatemala
Year	Membership
1948	4
1950	62
1960	1,807
1970	14,361
1979	17,973
1989*	99,000
1999	174,784
2009	215,186
2019	281,465
2025	297,143
*Membership was published as an estimate. Source: Wendall J. Ashton; Jim M. Wall, Deseret News, various years, Church Almanac Country Information: Guatemala

The first missionaries arrived in Guatemala in 1947. The first convert in Guatemala was baptized in 1948. The Central American Mission headquartered in Guatemala City was organized in 1952. The church obtained official recognition in Guatemala in 1966. Guatemala's first stake was formed in 1967 in Guatemala City.

In October 2019, the Coban Guatemala Temple was announced by church president Russell M. Nelson. The temple was dedicated in June 2024 by Dale G. Renlund and is the church's third temple in the country.

== Stakes and districts ==
As of July 2026, Guatemala had the following missions:

Stake/District	Organized	Mission	Temple
Amatitlán Guatemala Stake	28 Jun 1998	Guatemala Guatemala City Central	Guatemala City Guatemala
Antigua Guatemala Stake	5 May 2013	Guatemala Antigua	Guatemala City Guatemala
Chimaltenango Guatemala Stake	26 Oct 1986	Guatemala Antigua	Guatemala City Guatemala
Chulac Guatemala Stake	15 Nov 1992	Guatemala Cobán/Belize	Cobán Guatemala
Coatepeque Guatemala Stake	10 Dec 1989	Guatemala Retalhuleu	Quetzaltenango Guatemala
Coban Guatemala Stake	29 Oct 1995	Guatemala Cobán/Belize	Cobán Guatemala
Cuilapa Guatemala District	15 Dec 1984	Guatemala Guatemala City	Guatemala City Guatemala
Escuintla Guatemala Stake	12 Jun 1994	Guatemala Guatemala City Central	Guatemala City Guatemala
Guatemala Central Stake	8 Jun 1975	Guatemala Guatemala City	Guatemala City Guatemala
Guatemala City Atlántico Stake	7 Dec 1986	Guatemala Guatemala City East	Guatemala City Guatemala
Guatemala City Bosques de San Nicolás Stake	15 Oct 1995	Guatemala Guatemala City	Guatemala City Guatemala
Guatemala City Don Justo Stake	18 Jun 2017	Guatemala Guatemala City	Guatemala City Guatemala
Guatemala City El Molino Stake	19 Aug 1990	Guatemala Guatemala City East	Guatemala City Guatemala
Guatemala City Florida Stake	7 Dec 1986	Guatemala Antigua	Guatemala City Guatemala
Guatemala City La Esperanza Stake	30 Jan 1999	Guatemala Guatemala City East	Guatemala City Guatemala
Guatemala City La Laguna Stake	27 Nov 1988	Guatemala Guatemala City East	Guatemala City Guatemala
Guatemala City Las Victorias Stake	31 Oct 1976	Guatemala Guatemala City East	Guatemala City Guatemala
Guatemala City Mariscal Stake	10 Jun 1979	Guatemala Guatemala City Central	Guatemala City Guatemala
Guatemala City Milagro Stake	15 Apr 1990	Guatemala Antigua	Guatemala City Guatemala
Guatemala City Mixco Stake	15 Oct 1995	Guatemala Antigua	Guatemala City Guatemala
Guatemala City Nimajuyu Stake	9 Jul 1989	Guatemala Guatemala City	Guatemala City Guatemala
Guatemala City Palmita Stake	15 Jan 1995	Guatemala Guatemala City	Guatemala City Guatemala
Guatemala City San Cristóbal Stake	5 Jun 2016	Guatemala Antigua	Guatemala City Guatemala
Guatemala City Stake	21 May 1967	Guatemala Guatemala City	Guatemala City Guatemala
Guatemala City Villa Hermosa Stake	30 Apr 1995	Guatemala Guatemala City Central	Guatemala City Guatemala
Guazacapan Guatemala District	22 Jan 1990	Guatemala Guatemala City Central	Guatemala City Guatemala
Huehuetenango Guatemala Calvario Stake	19 Jun 1994	Guatemala Quetzaltenango	Quetzaltenango Guatemala
Huehuetenango Guatemala Central Stake	6 Jul 2014	Guatemala Quetzaltenango	Quetzaltenango Guatemala
Huehuetenango Guatemala Zaculeu Stake	4 Dec 1988	Guatemala Quetzaltenango	Quetzaltenango Guatemala
Jalapa Guatemala Stake	9 May 1993	Guatemala Guatemala City East	Guatemala City Guatemala
Linda Vista Guatemala Stake	21 Feb 2016	Guatemala Guatemala City Central	Guatemala City Guatemala
Malacatán Guatemala Stake	9 May 1993	Guatemala Retalhuleu	Quetzaltenango Guatemala
Mazatenango Guatemala Las Flores Stake	11 Jun 2023	Guatemala Retalhuleu	Quetzaltenango Guatemala
Mazatenango Guatemala Stake	10 Dec 1989	Guatemala Retalhuleu	Quetzaltenango Guatemala
Momostenango Guatemala Stake	12 May 1996	Guatemala Quetzaltenango	Quetzaltenango Guatemala
Motagua Guatemala District	17 Apr 1994	Guatemala Guatemala City East	Guatemala City Guatemala
Patzicia Guatemala Stake	10 Nov 1996	Guatemala Antigua	Guatemala City Guatemala
Paxajtup Guatemala District	31 Oct 2010	Guatemala Quetzaltenango	Quetzaltenango Guatemala
Polochic Guatemala Stake	31 May 2026	Guatemala Cobán/Belize	Cobán Guatemala
Pueblo Nuevo Tiquisate Guatemala District		Guatemala Retalhuleu	Quetzaltenango Guatemala
Puerto Barrios Guatemala District	27 Mar 1990	Guatemala Guatemala City East	Guatemala City Guatemala
Quetzaltenango Guatemala El Bosque Stake	6 Nov 1994	Guatemala Quetzaltenango	Quetzaltenango Guatemala
Quetzaltenango Guatemala Santa Fé Stake	19 Mar 2017	Guatemala Quetzaltenango	Quetzaltenango Guatemala
Quetzaltenango Guatemala Stake	19 Oct 1975	Guatemala Quetzaltenango	Quetzaltenango Guatemala
Quetzaltenango Guatemala West Stake	24 Oct 1984	Guatemala Quetzaltenango	Quetzaltenango Guatemala
Retalhuleu Guatemala Las Palmas Stake	28 Feb 1999	Guatemala Retalhuleu	Quetzaltenango Guatemala
Retalhuleu Guatemala Stake	17 Aug 1980	Guatemala Retalhuleu	Quetzaltenango Guatemala
Río Blanco Guatemala District		Guatemala Retalhuleu	Quetzaltenango Guatemala
Salama Guatemala District	27 Sep 1992	Guatemala Cobán/Belize	Cobán Guatemala
San Benito Guatemala Stake	15 Dec 1984	Guatemala Cobán/Belize	Cobán Guatemala
San Felipe Guatemala Stake	19 Sep 1993	Guatemala Retalhuleu	Quetzaltenango Guatemala
San Marcos Guatemala Stake	24 Oct 1984	Guatemala Retalhuleu	Quetzaltenango Guatemala
San Pedro Guatemala Stake	24 May 1998	Guatemala Retalhuleu	Quetzaltenango Guatemala
Santa Cruz del Quiche Guatemala District	2 Dec 1986	Guatemala Quetzaltenango	Quetzaltenango Guatemala
Santa Lucia Cotzumalguapa Guatemala Stake	12 Jun 1994	Guatemala Guatemala City Central	Guatemala City Guatemala
Senahu Guatemala Stake	5 Mar 1990	Guatemala Cobán/Belize	Cobán Guatemala
Solola Guatemala Stake	12 Jul 1979	Guatemala Antigua	Quetzaltenango Guatemala
Totonicapán Guatemala Stake	13 Sep 2009	Guatemala Quetzaltenango	Quetzaltenango Guatemala
Villa Nueva Guatemala El Frutal Stake	4 Nov 2012	Guatemala Guatemala City Central	Guatemala City Guatemala
Villa Nueva Guatemala Stake	27 Jan 1991	Guatemala Guatemala City Central	Guatemala City Guatemala
Zacapa Guatemala Stake	14 Jan 1996	Guatemala Guatemala City East	Guatemala City Guatemala

== Missions ==
As of July 2026, Guatemala had the following missions:

Mission	Organized
Guatemala Antigua	1 Jul 2019
Guatemala Cobán/Belize	1 Jul 2013
Guatemala Guatemala City	29 Mar 1988
Guatemala Guatemala City Central	1 Jul 1993
Guatemala Guatemala City East	1 Aug 1965
Guatemala Quetzaltenango	1 Jul 1977
Guatemala Retalhuleu	30 Jun 2010

== Temples ==

Temples in and near Guatemala
= Operating
= Under construction
= Announced
= Temporarily Closed

Temples in Guatemala Department
Red = Operating
Blue = Under construction
Yellow = Announced
Black = Closed for renovations

32. Guatemala City Guatemala Temple; Official website; News & images	
Location: Announced: Groundbreaking: Dedicated: Size: Style:	Guatemala City, Guatemala; 1 April 1981 by Spencer W. Kimball; 12 September 1982 by Richard G. Scott; 14 December 1984 by Gordon B. Hinckley; 11,610 sq ft (1,079 m^{2}) on a 1.4-acre (0.57 ha) site Modern adaptation of six-spire design - designed by Church A&E Services and Jose Asturias
136. Quetzaltenango Guatemala Temple; Official website; News & images	
Location: Announced: Groundbreaking: Dedicated: Size: Notes:	Quetzaltenango, Guatemala; 17 December 2006 by Gordon B. Hinckley; 14 March 2009 by Don R. Clarke; 11 December 2011 by Dieter F. Uchtdorf; 21,085 sq ft (1,958.9 m^{2}) on a 6.47-acre (2.62 ha) site - designed by Naylor Wentworth Lund Architects; Announced by Gordon B. Hinckley at the groundbreaking of the Oquirrh Mountain Temple, and dedicated by Dieter F. Uchtdorf.
193. Cobán Guatemala Temple; Official website; News & images	
Location: Announced: Groundbreaking: Dedicated: Size:	Cobán, Guatemala; 5 October 2019 by Russell M. Nelson; 14 November 2020 by Brian K. Taylor; 9 June 2024 by Dale G. Renlund; 8,772 sq ft (814.9 m^{2}) on a 2.1-acre (0.85 ha) site
223. Miraflores Guatemala City Guatemala Temple (Dedication scheduled); Official website; News & images	
Location: Announced: Groundbreaking: Open House: Dedicated: Size:	Guatemala City, Guatemala; 4 October 2020 by Russell M. Nelson; 3 December 2022 by Patricio M. Giuffra; 27 August-12 September 2026 scheduled for 11 October 2026; 30,000 sq ft (2,800 m^{2}) on a 1.5-acre (0.61 ha) site
277. Huehuetenango Guatemala Temple (Under construction); Official website; News & images	
Location: Announced: Groundbreaking: Size:	Huehuetenango, Guatemala; 2 October 2022 by Russell M. Nelson; 14 March 2026 by Patricio M. Giuffra; 10,787 sq ft (1,002.1 m^{2}) on a 3.4-acre (1.4 ha) site
317. Retalhuleu Guatemala Temple (Site announced); Official website; News & images	
Location: Announced:	Retalhuleu, Guatemala; 2 April 2023 by Russell M. Nelson on a 5.51-acre (2.23 ha) site

== See also ==
- Religion in Guatemala
