= The Church of Jesus Christ of Latter-day Saints in Taiwan =

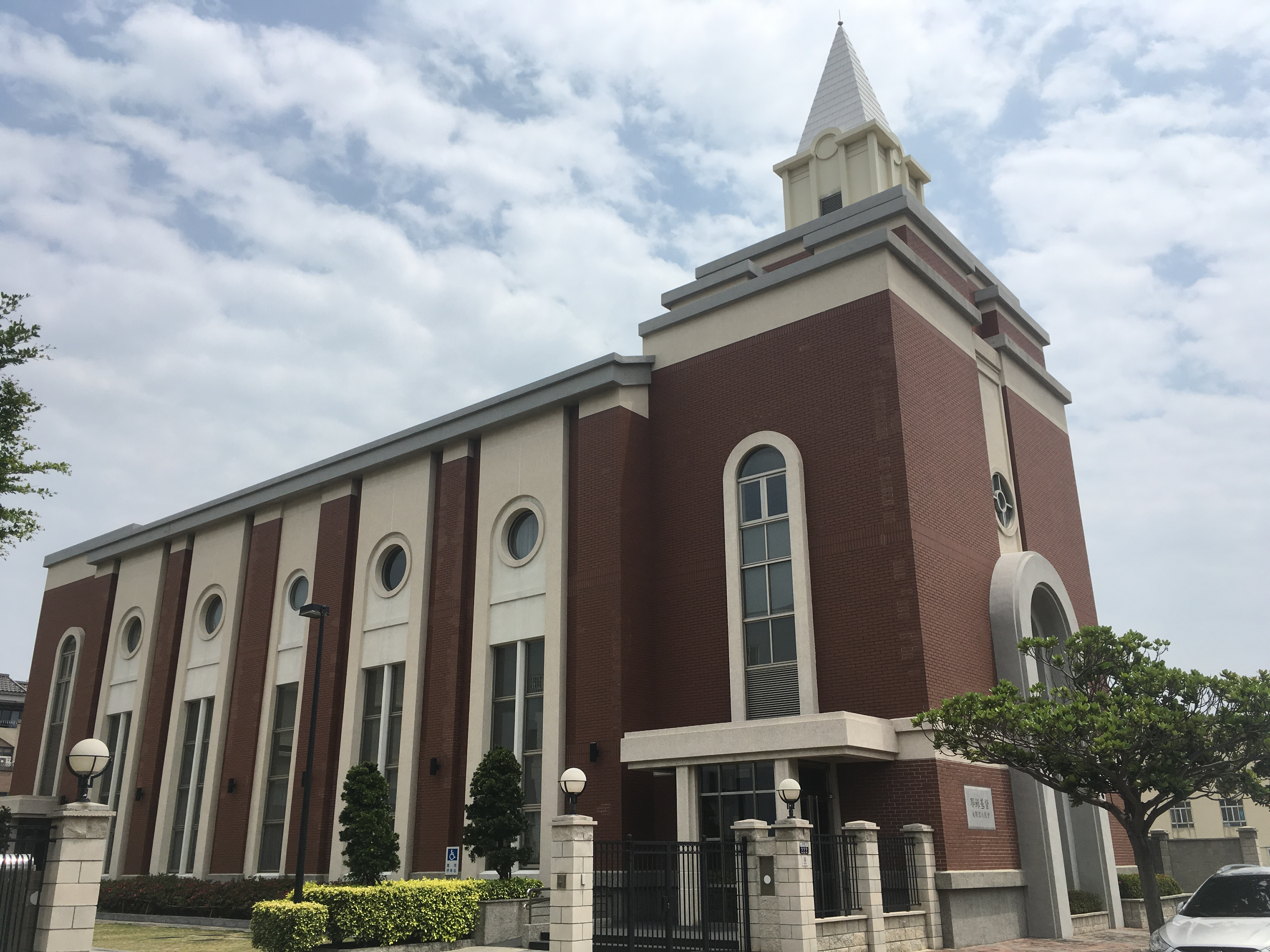
- Meetinghouse of The Church of Jesus Christ of Latter-day Saints in Shalu, Taichung
- Area: Asia
- Members: 63,425 (2025)
- Stakes: 16
- Wards: 87
- Branches: 10
- Total Congregations: 97
- Missions: 2
- Temples: 1 operating; 1 under construction; 2 total
- FamilySearch Centers: 16

Having 63,425 members in 2025, Taiwan has more members of the church than any Country or Territory in the Church's Asia Area.

== History ==
Membership in Taiwan
Year	Members
1960	371
1970	3,509
1980	8,367
1989*	17,000
1999	26,805
2009	49,054
2019	61,607
2025	63,425
*Membership was published as an estimated or rounded number.

In June 1956, four missionaries arrived in Taiwan.

Hu Wei-I, a convert, helped translate the Book of Mormon into Mandarin Chinese.

In November 1984, Gordon B. Hinckley dedicated the Taipei Taiwan Temple.

== Stakes ==
As of May 2025, the LDS Church has the following 16 stakes in Taiwan:

Stake	Organized	Mission
Chiayi Taiwan	23 Oct 2011	Taiwan Kaohsiung
Chung Hsing Taiwan	20 Jun 2004	Taiwan Kaohsiung
Hsin Chu Taiwan	14 Dec 2003	Taiwan Taipei
Hualien Taiwan	23 Sep 1990	Taiwan Taipei
Kaohsiung Taiwan North	20 Dec 2015	Taiwan Kaohsiung
Kaohsiung Taiwan South	6 Nov 1981	Taiwan Kaohsiung
Taichung Taiwan East	18 Dec 1994	Taiwan Kaohsiung
Taichung Taiwan West	22 Apr 2007	Taiwan Kaohsiung
Tainan Taiwan	15 Jun 1997	Taiwan Kaohsiung
Taipei Taiwan Central	24 May 1998	Taiwan Taipei
Taipei Taiwan East	14 Mar 1982	Taiwan Taipei
Taipei Taiwan North	13 Dec 2015	Taiwan Taipei
Taipei Taiwan South	30 Nov 2014	Taiwan Taipei
Taipei Taiwan West	22 Apr 1976	Taiwan Taipei
Taoyuan Taiwan	8 Jul 2001	Taiwan Taipei

== Missions ==
Stake	Organized
Taiwan Kaohsiung	1 Jul 1976
Taiwan Taipei	11 Dec 1970

== Temples ==
Temples in Taiwan
Red = Operating
Blue = Under construction
Yellow = Announced
Black = Closed for renovations

On November 17, 1984 the Taipei Taiwan Temple was dedicated by Gordon B. Hinckley.

On October 3, 2021, the Kaohsiung Taiwan Temple was announced by church president Russell M. Nelson.

31. Taipei Taiwan Temple; Official website; News & images	
Location: Announced: Groundbreaking: Dedicated: Size: Style:	Taipei, Taiwan; 31 March 1982 by Spencer W. Kimball; 27 August 1982 by Gordon B. Hinckley; 17 November 1984 by Gordon B. Hinckley; 9,945 sq ft (923.9 m^{2}) on a 0.5-acre (0.20 ha) site Modern adaptation of six-spire design - designed by Church A&E Services with Philip fei & Associations
243. Kaohsiung Taiwan Temple (Under construction); Official website; News & images	
Location: Announced: Groundbreaking: Size:	Kaohsiung, Taiwan; 3 October 2021 by Russell M. Nelson; 23 November 2023 by Benjamin M. Z. Tai; 10,900 sq ft (1,010 m^{2}) on a 1.26-acre (0.51 ha) site

== See also ==
- Religion in Taiwan:Latter Day Saints
- Christianity in Taiwan:Latter Day Saints
