= Quetzaltenango Guatemala Temple =

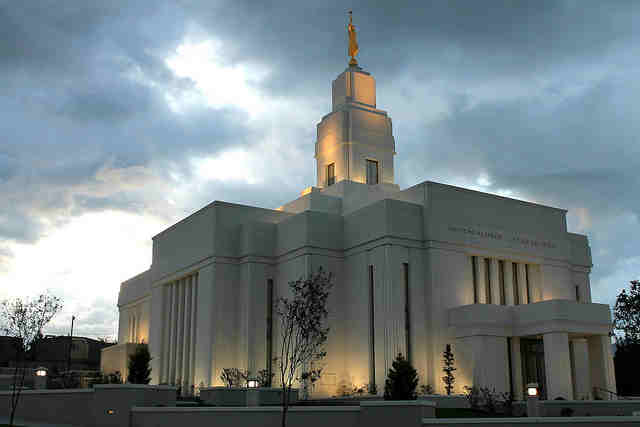
- Interactive map of Quetzaltenango Guatemala Temple
- Number: 136
- Dedication: 11 December 2011, by Dieter F. Uchtdorf
- Site: 6.47 acres (2.62 ha)
- Floor area: 21,085 ft^{2} (1,958.9 m^{2})
- Height: 80 ft (24 m)
- Official website • News & images

Church chronology
← San Salvador El Salvador Temple	Quetzaltenango Guatemala Temple	→ Kansas City Missouri Temple

Additional information
- Announced: 17 December 2006, by Gordon B. Hinckley
- Groundbreaking: 14 March 2009, by Don R. Clarke
- Open house: 11 — 26 November 2011
- Current president: Amilcar Raul Robles
- Designed by: Naylor Wentworth Lund Architects
- Location: Quetzaltenango, Guatemala
- Coordinates: 14°50′41″N 91°32′23″W
- Exterior finish: Precast concrete panels from Mexico
- Baptistries: 1
- Ordinance rooms: 2 (two-stage progressive)
- Sealing rooms: 2
- Notes: Announced by Gordon B. Hinckley at the groundbreaking of the Oquirrh Mountain Temple, and dedicated by Dieter F. Uchtdorf.

The Quetzaltenango Guatemala Temple is a temple of the Church of Jesus Christ of Latter-day Saints located in Quetzaltenango, Guatemala. It is in the western part of the city, near the Parque Zoológico Minerva. The intent to build the temple was announced on December 16, 2006, by church president Gordon B. Hinckley during the groundbreaking ceremony of the Oquirrh Mountain Utah Temple. It is the second in Guatemala, the fifth in Central America, and the 136th temple in operation worldwide at the time of its dedication.

It has a total floor area of 21,085 square feet (1,959 m²) and is on a 6.47-acre (2.6 ha) site. The design has a single spire, with a gold-leafed angel Moroni statue on top, and has a precast concrete exterior fabricated in Mexico.

== History ==
On June 5, 1979, Boyd K. Packer of the Quorum of the Twelve Apostles said that Guatemala would one day have temples in Guatemala City, Quetzaltenango, and Cobán. The first, the Guatemala City Guatemala Temple, was announced in 1981 and dedicated in 1984 by Gordon B. Hinckley. The Quetzaltenango Guatemala Temple was announced by Hinckley on December 16, 2006.

Groundbreaking took place on March 14, 2009, with Don R. Clarke, president of the church's Central America Area, presiding. More than 700 guests, including local officials, were in attendance. Jacobsen Construction served as the general contractor, with local architectural and project management collaborators.

On October 1, 2010, the angel Moroni statue was placed on the spire. Baer Welding of Utah supplied and installed custom stainless steel and bronze railings, including etched glass panels in the baptistry and bronze-capped site rails for the grounds. An adjacent ancillary building was also fitted with balcony and handrail systems to accommodate visiting patrons.

After construction was completed, a public open house was held from November 11 to November 26, 2011, excluding Sundays, with over 126,000 visitors, including 16,500 on the final day. Among the attendees were Guatemalan president Álvaro Colom, four cabinet ministers, and Jorge Barrientos, mayor of Quetzaltenango.

On December 10, 2011, a cultural celebration with 2,400 youth from the temple district featured music and dance. The temple was dedicated in three sessions on December 11, 2011, by Dieter F. Uchtdorf, Second Counselor in the First Presidency. It was the first temple he dedicated. The services were broadcast nationwide to meetinghouses throughout Guatemala. Other church leaders attending were Neil L. Andersen, of the Quorum of the Twelve Apostles, and four members of the Seventy: Larry W. Gibbons, Enrique R. Falabella, Carlos A. Amado, and James Martino.

== Design and architecture ==
The temple is on a 6.47-acre (2.6 ha) site on a knoll overlooking the Quetzaltenango Valley. The landscaped grounds include walkways, trees, and a patron housing facility. The structure is 80 feet (24.4 m) tall, with an exterior of precast concrete panels from Mexico and a single spire that has a gold-leafed angel Moroni statue.

The interior has Mayan-inspired motifs in stone, wood, and glasswork. Paintings depict the volcanic landscapes of western Guatemala. Custom railings with etched glass panels were installed in the baptistry, with additional stainless steel and bronze fixtures throughout the building. Along with the baptistry, the temple also has two ordinance rooms and two sealing rooms. It has the same floor plan as the Snowflake Arizona and Winter Quarters Nebraska temples.

== Community impact ==
The temple has become a landmark in Quetzaltenango, situated near cultural and civic institutions such as the Parque Zoológico Minerva. The open house drew more than 126,000 visitors, including government leaders.

At the dedication, Uchtdorf described the temple as bringing eternal families to Guatemala, “as sacred as the temple of Solomon, the temple in Nauvoo, the temple in Salt Lake City, or as sacred as any of the temples in the world.”

Members in western Guatemala had historically traveled long distances to attend temples in Mesa, Arizona (1927), Mexico City (1983), and Guatemala City (1984), before the Quetzaltenango temple’s completion in 2011.

== Temple presidents ==
The church's temples are directed by a temple president and matron, each typically serving for a term of three years. The president and matron oversee the administration of temple operations and provide guidance and training for both temple patrons and staff.

The first president of the Quetzaltenango Guatemala Temple was Ysrael Escobar López, who served with his wife, Marta Isabel Escobar. They were succeeded by Amílcar Raúl Robles Arango and Sandra Lisbet Fuentes Meza de Robles.

== Admittance ==
The public open house was held November 11–26, 2011, except Sundays. Like all the church's temples, it is not used for Sunday worship services. To members of the church, temples are regarded as sacred houses of the Lord. Once dedicated, only church members with a current temple recommend can enter for worship.

== See also ==

Temples in and near Guatemala
= Operating
= Under construction
= Announced
= Temporarily Closed

- Comparison of temples of The Church of Jesus Christ of Latter-day Saints
- List of temples of The Church of Jesus Christ of Latter-day Saints
- List of temples of The Church of Jesus Christ of Latter-day Saints by geographic region
- Temple architecture (Latter-day Saints)
- The Church of Jesus Christ of Latter-day Saints in Guatemala
