= The Church of Jesus Christ of Latter-day Saints in Ukraine =

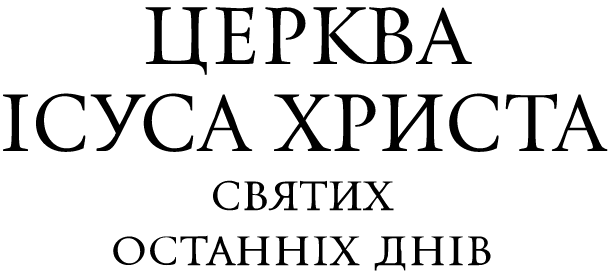
- (Logo in Ukrainian)

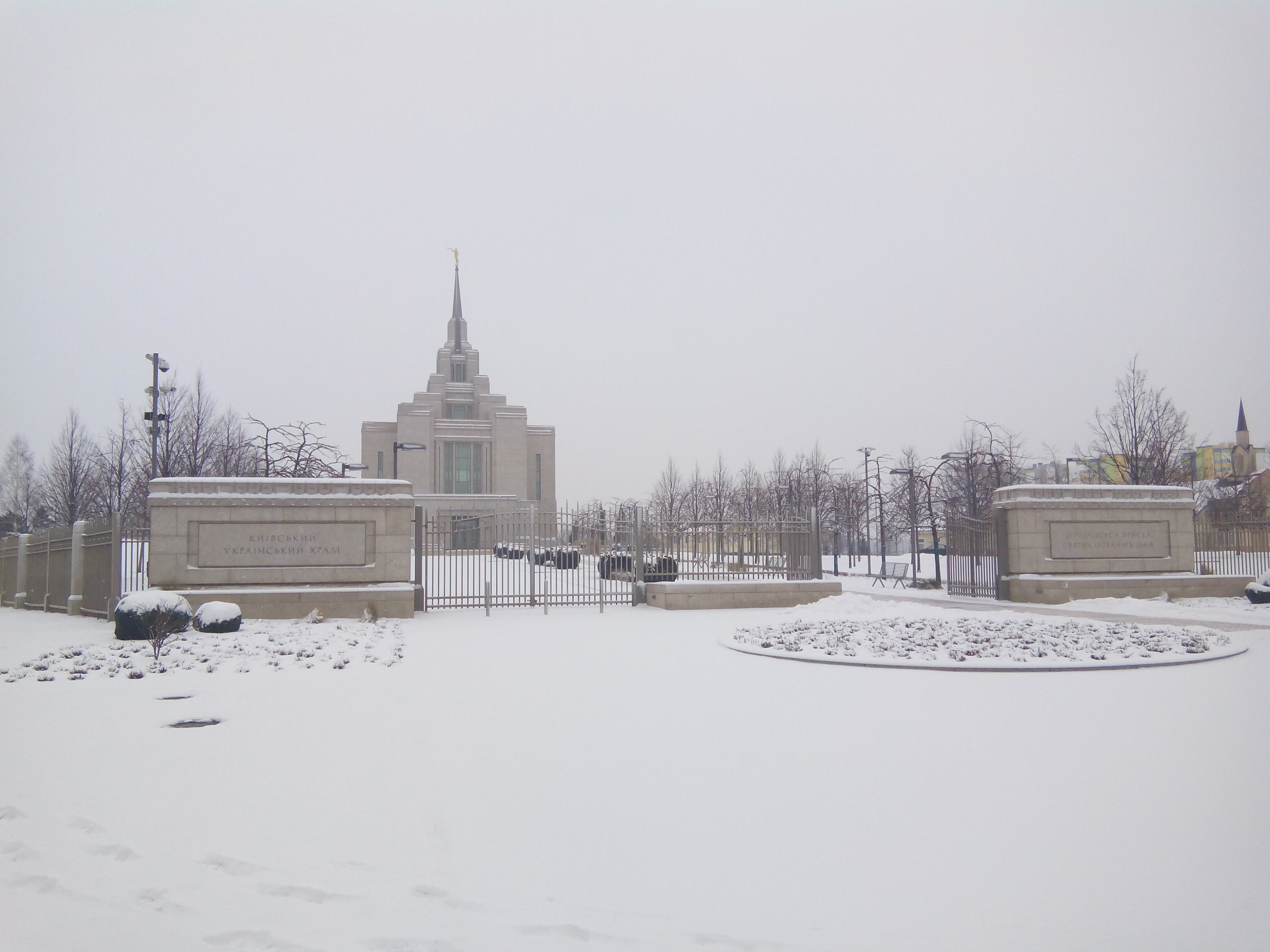
- The Kyiv Ukraine Temple. An LDS meetinghouse is on the far right.
- Area: Europe North
- Members: 10,014 (2025)
- Stakes: 2
- Districts: 3
- Wards: 13
- Branches: 33
- Total congregations: 46
- Missions: 1
- Temples: 1 operating
- FamilySearch Centers: 35

The Church of Jesus Christ of Latter-day Saints in Ukraine refers to the Church of Jesus Christ of Latter-day Saints (LDS Church) and its members in Ukraine. In January 1991, there were forty members in one congregation in Ukraine. In December 2022, there were 10,344 members in forty-six congregations. In 2022, church membership dropped from 11,216 to 10,344, likely due to the Russian invasion of Ukraine.

== History ==
Membership in Ukraine
Year	Membership
1991	40
1999	6,369
2009	10,557
2019	11,242
2025	10,014

Since 1922, Ukraine was part of the Union of Soviet Socialist Republics (USSR) under communist control, which restricted most religious institutions. Near the end of the USSR, a new law was passed granting freedom of individual religious practice and allowing independent religious organizations. During this time of change, the church's first missionaries arrived in Ukraine. The president of the Austria Vienna East Mission, Howard L. Biddulph, visited in June 1991 and Ukraine's first branch was organized in Kyiv with 40 members. In September of that year, Boyd K. Packer and Dallin H. Oaks of the Quorum of the Twelve Apostles visited, so that Packer could dedicate the nation for missionary preaching, and the LDS Church was officially registered with the Ukrainian government. In early 1992, shortly after Ukraine's secession from the USSR, the Ukraine Kyiv Mission was created with 35 missionaries, with Biddulph serving as its first president. Another mission was created in Donetsk in July 1993.

Until June 28, 1998 the LDS Church did not have its own meetinghouses in Ukraine, so church services were held in rented buildings with baptisms being performed in the Dnieper River or in swimming pools. In the early years, the church sought to offer aide to the Ukrainian nation by organizing humanitarian donations of food and clothing from members in the United States and Germany from 1992–1993, and a large donation of medical supplies in 1995.

In 1998, the church announced plans to construct a temple somewhere in Kyiv. This would be the second temple in Eastern Europe, after the Freiberg Germany Temple, which was the closest temple for Ukrainian members. However, construction was postponed due to delays in acquiring the needed land. Ground was finally broken in 2007, and the temple was completed and dedicated on August 29, 2010. The Kyiv Ukraine Temple was to accommodate members from Armenia, Belarus, Bulgaria, Georgia, Kazakhstan, Moldova, Romania, Russia, and Ukraine.

On May 30, 2004, the Kyiv Ukraine Stake, Ukraine's first, was organized.

During the 2014 pro-Russian unrest in Ukraine, all missionaries of the Ukraine Donetsk Mission were removed from the country and reassigned elsewhere. Because of a slowing rate of convert baptisms, the Ukraine L'viv Mission was closed in 2018.

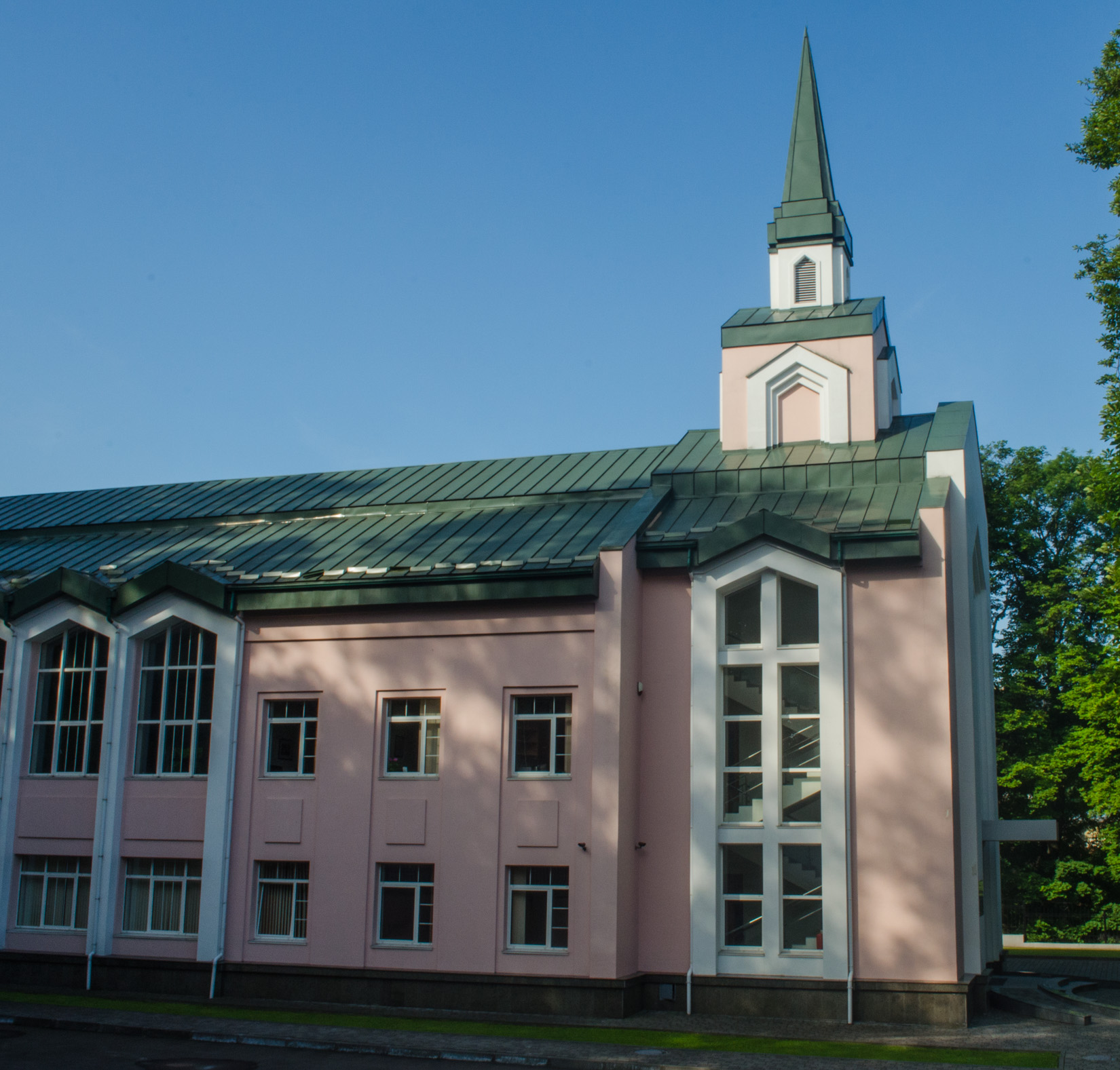
An LDS meetinghouse in Lviv

On January 24, 2022, due to increasing Ukraine-Russia tensions, the LDS Church announced that out of an abundance of caution, full-time missionaries assigned to both the Ukraine Dnipro and Ukraine Kyiv/Moldova missions were being temporarily reassigned to locations outside of Ukraine. This followed a statement from the US State Department recommending all U.S. citizens in Ukraine promptly depart the country. On February 16, 2022, LDS Church representatives took part in celebrations for the Day of Unity. On February 22, 2022 the presidency of the church's Europe East Area released a statement saying they understood the challenges facing Ukrainians and that the church in remained open in the country. In February 2022, the temple was closed, due to Russia's invasion of Ukraine, but reopened on October 16 of the same year.

== Stakes and districts ==
As of August 2026, the following stakes and districts were located in Ukraine:

Stake/District	Organized	Mission
Donetsk Ukraine District	24 Sep 1995	Ukraine Dnipro
Kharkiv Ukraine Stake	21 Jan 1996	Ukraine Dnipro
Kyiv Ukraine Stake	30 May 2004	Ukraine Kyiv/Moldova
L'viv Ukraine District	28 Feb 2016	Ukraine Kyiv/Moldova
Odessa Ukraine District	15 Oct 1997	Ukraine Dnipro

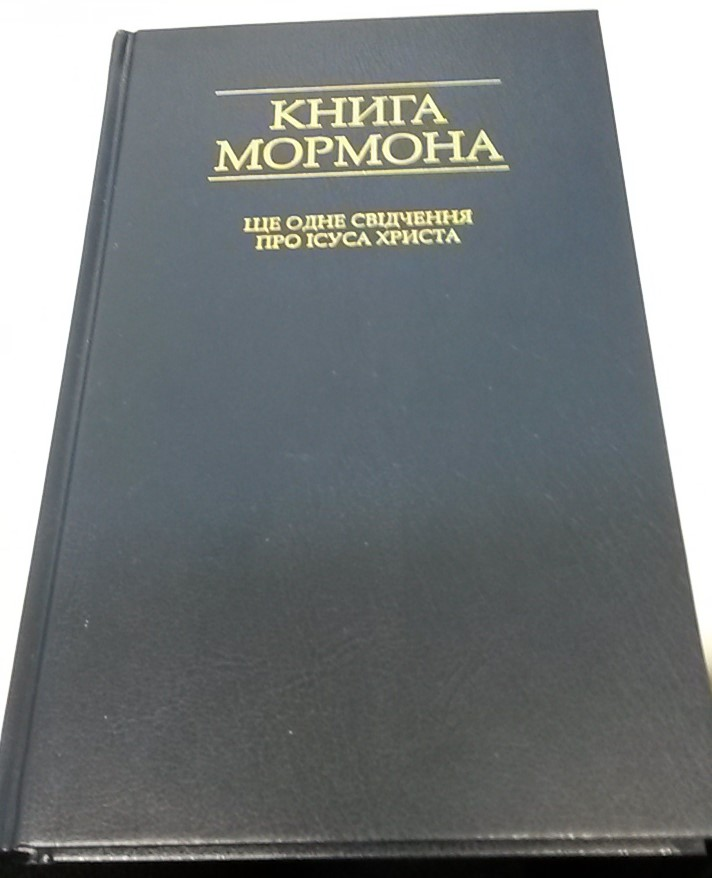
The Book of Mormon in Ukrainian

== Missions ==
- Ukraine Dnipro Mission
- Ukraine Donetsk Mission (closed in 2014)
- Ukraine Kyiv/Moldova Mission
- Ukraine Lviv Mission (closed in 2018)

=== Moldova ===
The Church of Jesus Christ of Latter-day Saints in Moldova
- Area: Separate
- Members: 471 (2025)
- Branches: 2
- FamilySearch Centers: 1

In the mid-1990s some church members moved to Moldova for work and started conducting meetings. Charles A. Didier, of the Seventy, along with Robert F. Orton, president of the Romania Bucharest Mission, met with members in Chisinau, Moldova in September 1997. The first missionaries arrived shortly after but couldn't openly proselyte and relied on member referrals. On 9 November 1997, a branch was organized in Chişinau. The first baptismal service in Moldova had 5 individuals baptized on 11 November 1997. The church's seminary and institute programs began in 1998. The Romanian translation of the Book of Mormon was published on 23 December 1998. On 16 May 2001, Moldova was dedicated for the preaching of the gospel.

A Russian-speaking branch was created on 23 November 2014 with the other branch being conducted in Romanian and English. The Romania/Moldova Mission closed in mid-2018 and Moldova was reassigned to the Ukraine Kyiv Mission, which was renamed the Ukraine Kyiv/Moldova Mission.

== Temples ==
The Kyiv Ukraine Temple was announced in 1998 and was dedicated in 2010.

134. Kyiv Ukraine Temple; Official website; News & images	
Location: Announced: Groundbreaking: Dedicated: Size:	Sofiivska Borshchahivka, Ukraine; 20 July 1998 by Gordon B. Hinckley; 23 June 2007 by Paul B. Pieper; 29 August 2010 by Thomas S. Monson; 22,184 sq ft (2,061.0 m^{2}) on a 12.35-acre (5.00 ha) site - designed by MHTN and Strabag AG

== See also ==
- Religion in Ukraine
