= Eastern Orthodoxy in Guatemala =

Eastern Orthodoxy in Guatemala refers to adherents, communities and organizations of Eastern Orthodox Christianity in Guatemala. Many of the Eastern Orthodox Christians in Guatemala are ethnic Mayas. Although the dominant religion in Guatemala is historically Roman Catholicism, in recent decades other Christian denominations have gained adherents there. Eastern Orthodox Christianity in particular has been growing rapidly, as a number of schismatic Catholic groups have expressed their desire to become Eastern Orthodox and have been received under the jurisdiction of Eastern Orthodox hierarchs. Currently, there are two distinct Eastern Orthodox communities in Guatemala, the Antiochian and the Constantinopolitan.

== Antiochian ==
Eastern Orthodox Christianity arrived in Guatemala at the end of the 19th century and the beginning of the 20th century with immigrants from Eastern Europe and the Middle East. In the 1980s two Catholic women, Mother Inés and Mother María, converted to Eastern Orthodox Christianity and established a monastery dedicated to the Holy Trinity. In 1992 they were received into the Antiochian Patriarchate and in 1995 the Catholic Apostolic Orthodox Antiochian Church in Guatemala was formally established. The state orphanage of Hogar Rafael Ayau, established in 1857, was privatized and transferred to their care in 1996.

The Antiochian Eastern Orthodox Church in Guatemala is part of the Antiochian Patriarchate's Archdiocese of Mexico, Venezuela, Central America and the Caribbean. Its first temple was dedicated in 1997.

On 5 November 2017, the Monastery of the Holy Trinity and the associated orphanage, Hogar Rafael Ayau, were canonically transferred from the Orthodox Church of Antioch to the Serbian Orthodox Church. Amfilohije, Metropolitan of Montenegro and the Littoral and the Administrator of South-Central America, came to Amatitlán to greet Mother Inés.

== Constantinopolitan ==
A different, mostly indigenous Mayan, group was accepted into the Ecumenical Patriarchate of Constantinople in 2010. This had been a group which was part of the Catholic Charismatic Renewal movement and had rocky relations with the Roman Catholic Church. Eventually, the group's leader, Father Andrés Girón, who had previously served as a congressional representative, as a senator in 1991 and as an ambassador to the United Nations, left the Roman Catholic Church over tensions related to his support for land reform and their support for "liturgical reform". (Note: Girón carried a pistol at his waist and "was thought to be a violent priest," but his family members were assassinated and he was assigned a four-man submachine gun armed bodyguard by president Vinicio Cerezo.) Girón and his followers, who numbered between 10,000 and 100,000, first joined the Society of clerks secular of Saint Basil, (Note: Girón was the nominal president of the Society Of Clerks Secular Of Saint Basil when it was incorporated in Louisiana in 2008.) and later moved towards Orthodoxy, being received into the Ecumenical Patriarchate of Constantinople in 2010. According to the Orthodox Christian Mission Center, this may well be the largest mass-conversion to Orthodoxy since the Christianization of Kievan Rus' in 988. The Orthodox Church promptly sent missionaries to Guatemala to educate and catechize the newfound converts.

== See also ==
- History of the Eastern Orthodox Church
- History of Eastern Christianity
- Mayan religion
- Western Rite Orthodoxy
