= Kyiv Ukraine Temple =

Latter-day Saint religious building in Ukraine

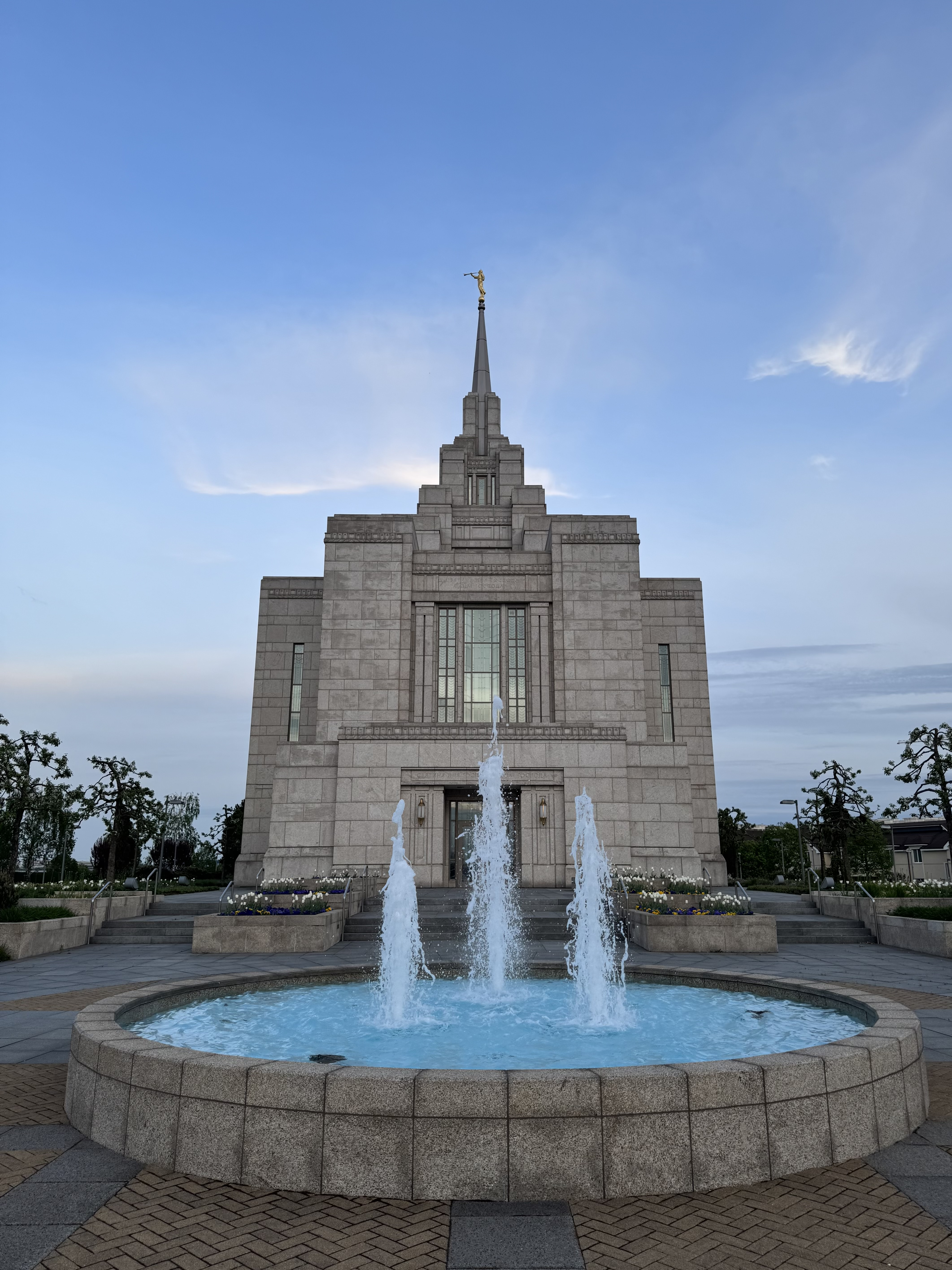
- Kyiv Ukraine Temple in 2026
- Interactive map of Kyiv Ukraine Temple
- Number: 134
- Dedication: 29 August 2010, by Thomas S. Monson
- Site: 12.35 acres (5.00 ha)
- Floor area: 22,184 ft^{2} (2,061.0 m^{2})
- Height: 137.8 ft (42.0 m)
- Official website • News & images

Church chronology
← Cebu City Philippines Temple	Kyiv Ukraine Temple	→ San Salvador El Salvador Temple

Additional information
- Announced: 20 July 1998, by Gordon B. Hinckley
- Groundbreaking: 23 June 2007, by Paul B. Pieper
- Open house: 7–21 August 2010
- Current president: Borys Evgen’evich Vyshnevskyi
- Designed by: MHTN and Strabag AG
- Location: Sofiivska Borshchahivka, Ukraine
- Coordinates: 50°24′15.04080″N 30°23′43.16639″E
- Exterior finish: Amarelo Macieira granite with quartzite crystals
- Baptistries: 1
- Ordinance rooms: 2 (Two-stage progressive)
- Sealing rooms: 2

The Kyiv Ukraine Temple is the 134th operating temple of the Church of Jesus Christ of Latter-day Saints. The intent to build the temple was announced by the church's First Presidency on July 20, 1998. Located in Sofiivska Borshchahivka, near Kyiv (the capital of Ukraine), it is the church's 11th temple in Europe, the first in the territory of the former Soviet Union, and the second in the former Eastern Bloc. A groundbreaking ceremony, to signify beginning of construction, was held on June 23, 2007, conducted by Paul B. Pieper.

== History ==
The plan to build a temple in Ukraine were announced by the church on 20 July 1998. The announcement was unique in that it came eight years after missionaries entered the country, and was the first temple outside the United States to be dedicated within twenty years of the church entering the country. When the temple was announced, there were only five thousand church members in Ukraine. As of 2024, there are approximately ten thousand.

However, the project was delayed for nine years as the church had difficulty obtaining the three to four hectares of land it wanted for the project. On 23 June 2007, ground was broken for the project by Paul B. Pieper, a general authority who was first counselor in the presidency of the church's Europe East Area.

After construction was complete, a two-week public open house was held from 7–21 August 2010. The temple was dedicated on 29 August 2010 by church president Thomas S. Monson.

On September 12, 2011, the Ukrainian Ministry of Regional Development, Construction, Housing and Communal Services awarded the Kyiv Ukraine Temple first place for the best religious building constructed in Ukraine in 2010.

In 2020, like all others in the church, the Kyiv Ukraine Temple was closed in response to the COVID-19 pandemic. In February 2022, the temple was closed due to Russia's invasion of Ukraine but reopened later in the year, on October 16.

== Design and architecture ==
The temple is on a 12.35-acre plot, and the landscaping around the temple features flower gardens and trees. These elements provide a tranquil setting to enhances the sacred atmosphere of the site.

The structure is constructed with Amarelo Macieira granite with quartzite crystals. The exterior has a multilevel tower and angel Moroni statue.

The temple includes a baptistry, a celestial room, two ordinance rooms, and two sealing rooms, each arranged for ceremonial use.

The design uses elements representing both Ukrainian and Latter-day Saint symbolism, providing deeper spiritual meaning to the temple's appearance and function. Symbolism is important to church members and includes the two main design motifs of the temple, which are decorated Easter eggs and staffs of wheat. The use of wheat sheaves is a reference to the historical importance of wheat production in Ukraine, while the Easter eggs symbolize the Resurrection and Atonement of Christ. The angel Moroni statue represents “the restored gospel being taken to all of Eastern Europe.”

== Temple presidents ==
The church's temples are directed by a temple president and matron, each serving for a term of three years. The president and matron oversee the administration of temple operations and provide guidance and training for both temple patrons and staff.

The first president of the Kyiv Ukraine Temple was Bruce J. Galbraith, with Carol J. Galbraith as matron. They served from its dedication in 2010 until 2013. As of 2024, the president and matron are Borys E. Vyshnevskyi and Alla I, Vishnevskaia.

== Admittance ==
Following the temple's completion, a public open house was held from April 7-August 21, 2010 (excluding Sundays). The temple was dedicated during three sessions by Thomas S. Monson on August 29, 2010.

Like all the church's temples, it is not used for Sunday worship services. To members of the church, temples are regarded as sacred houses of the Lord. Once dedicated, only church members with a current temple recommend can enter for worship.

== Gallery ==
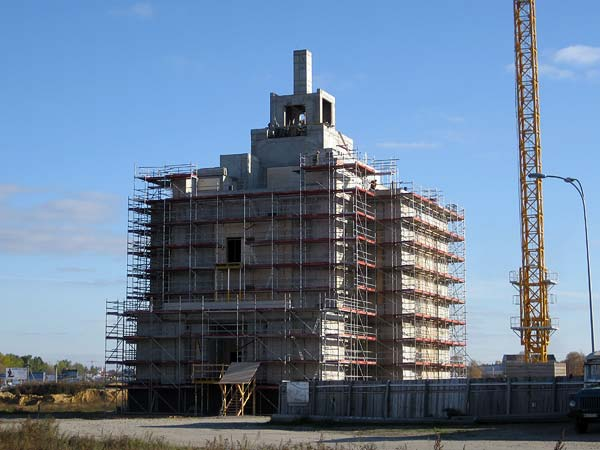
Under construction

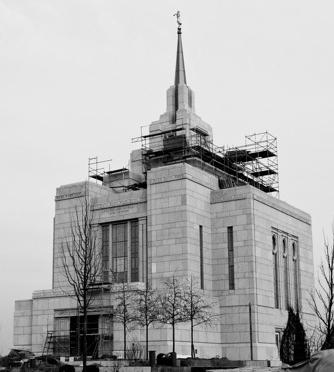
Under construction

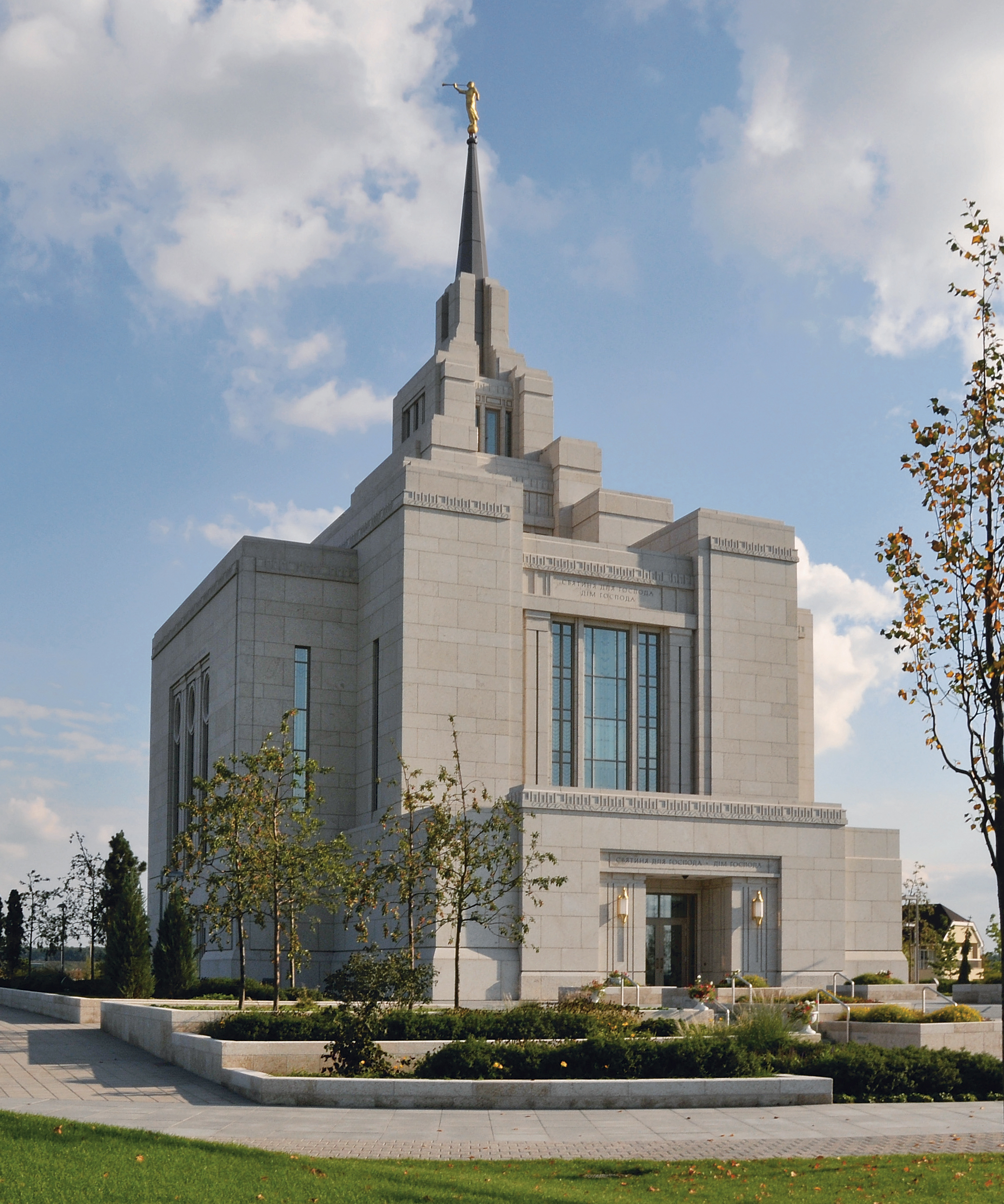
ca. 2010

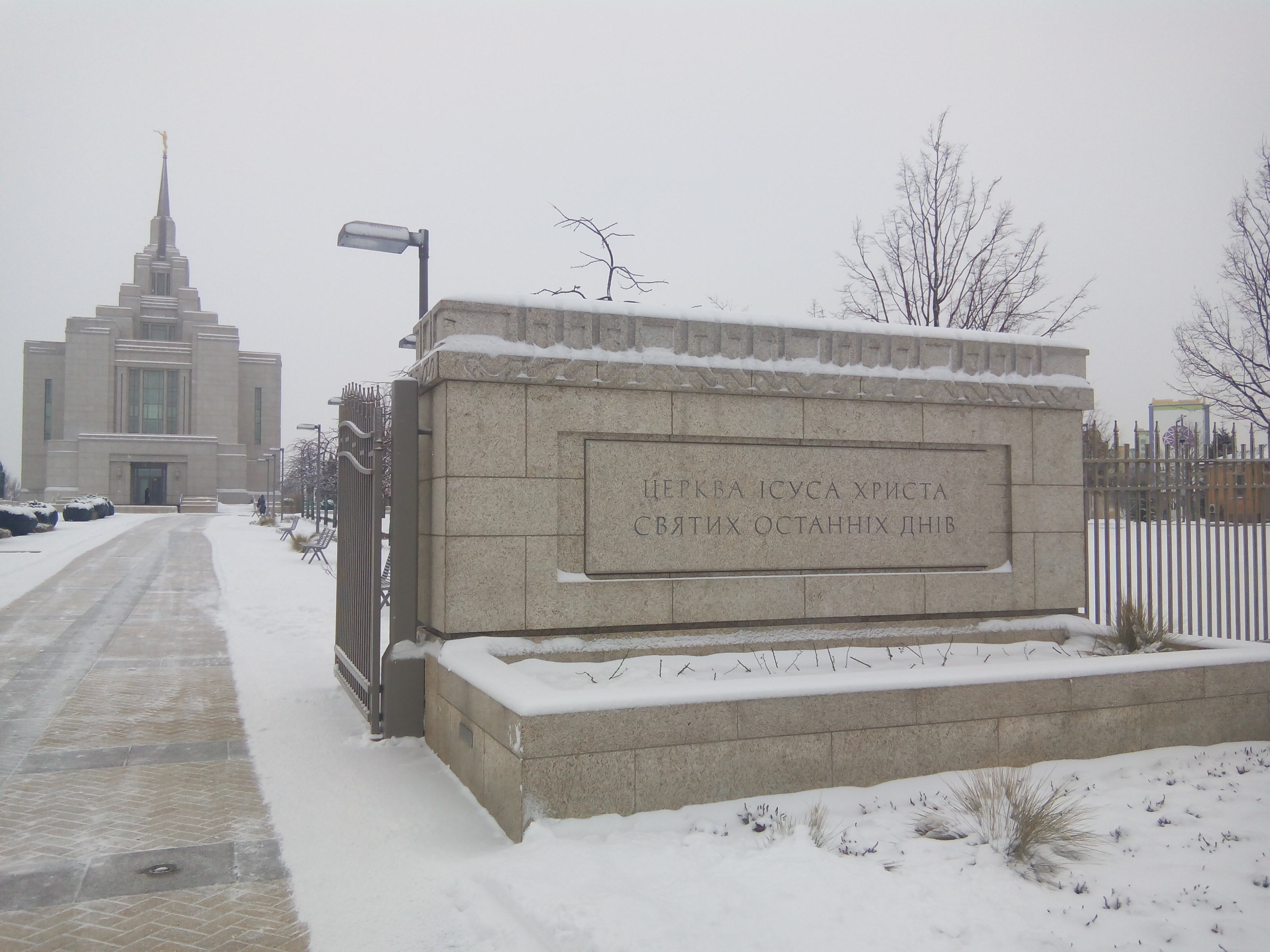
ca. 2018

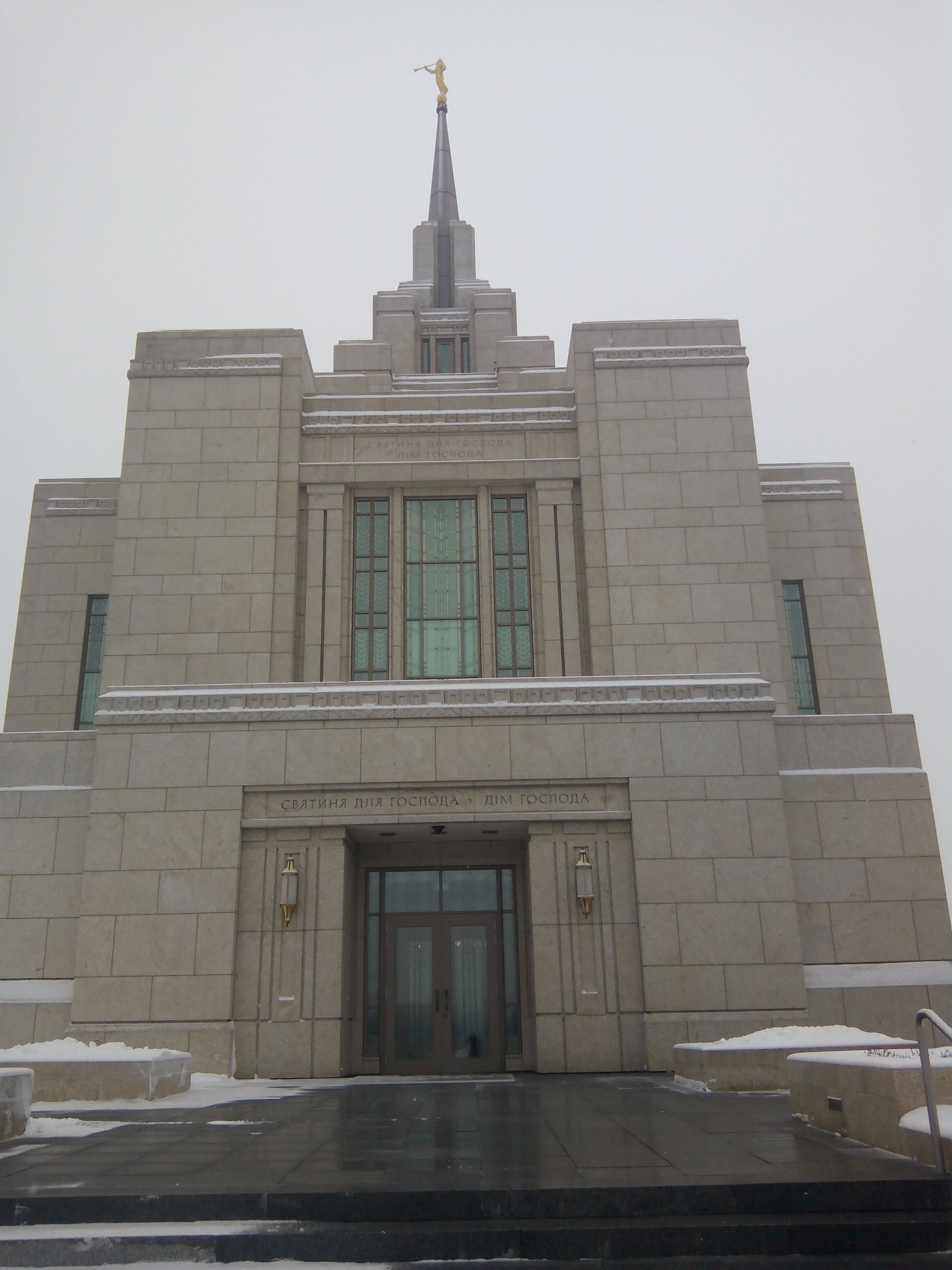

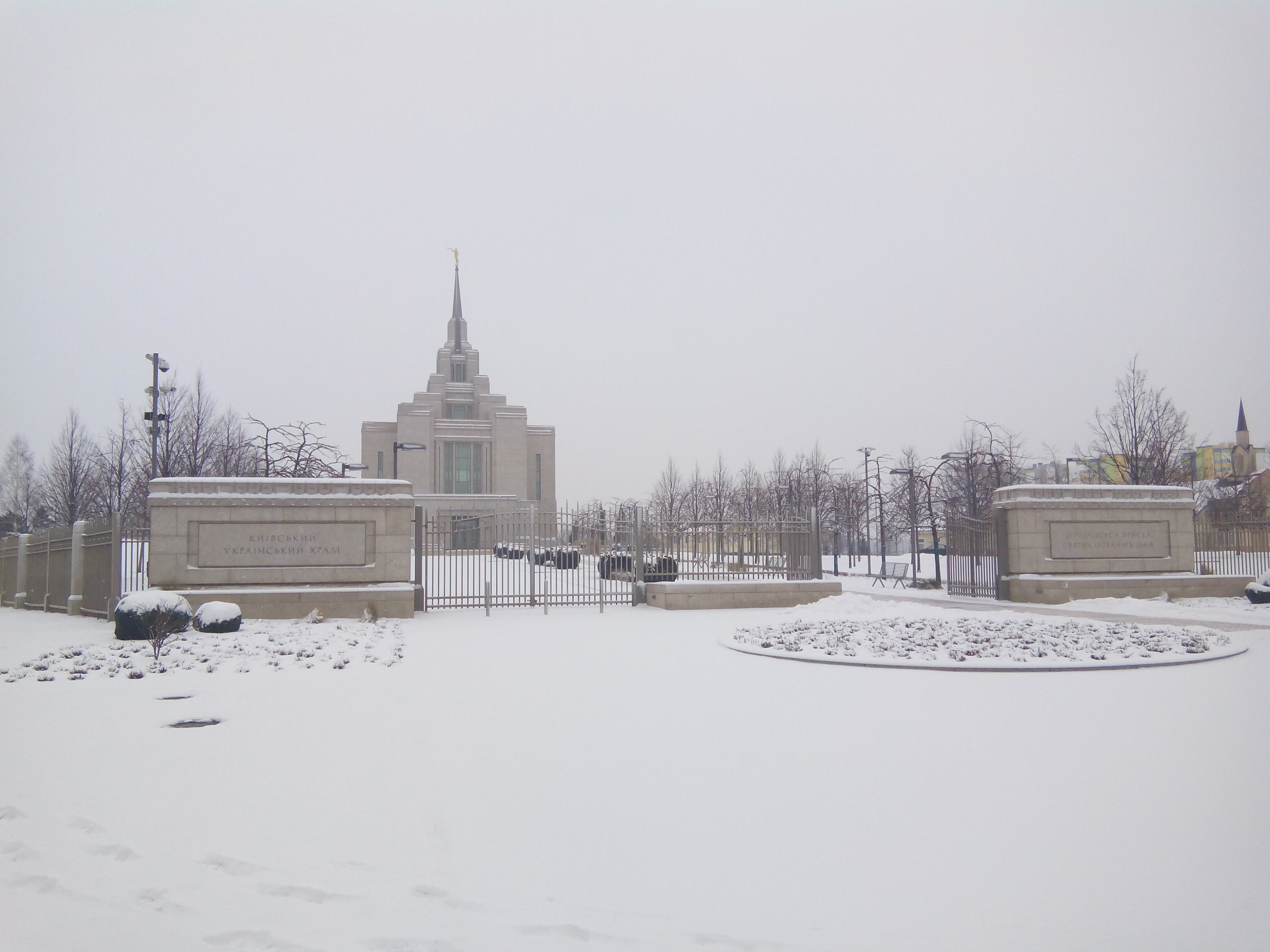

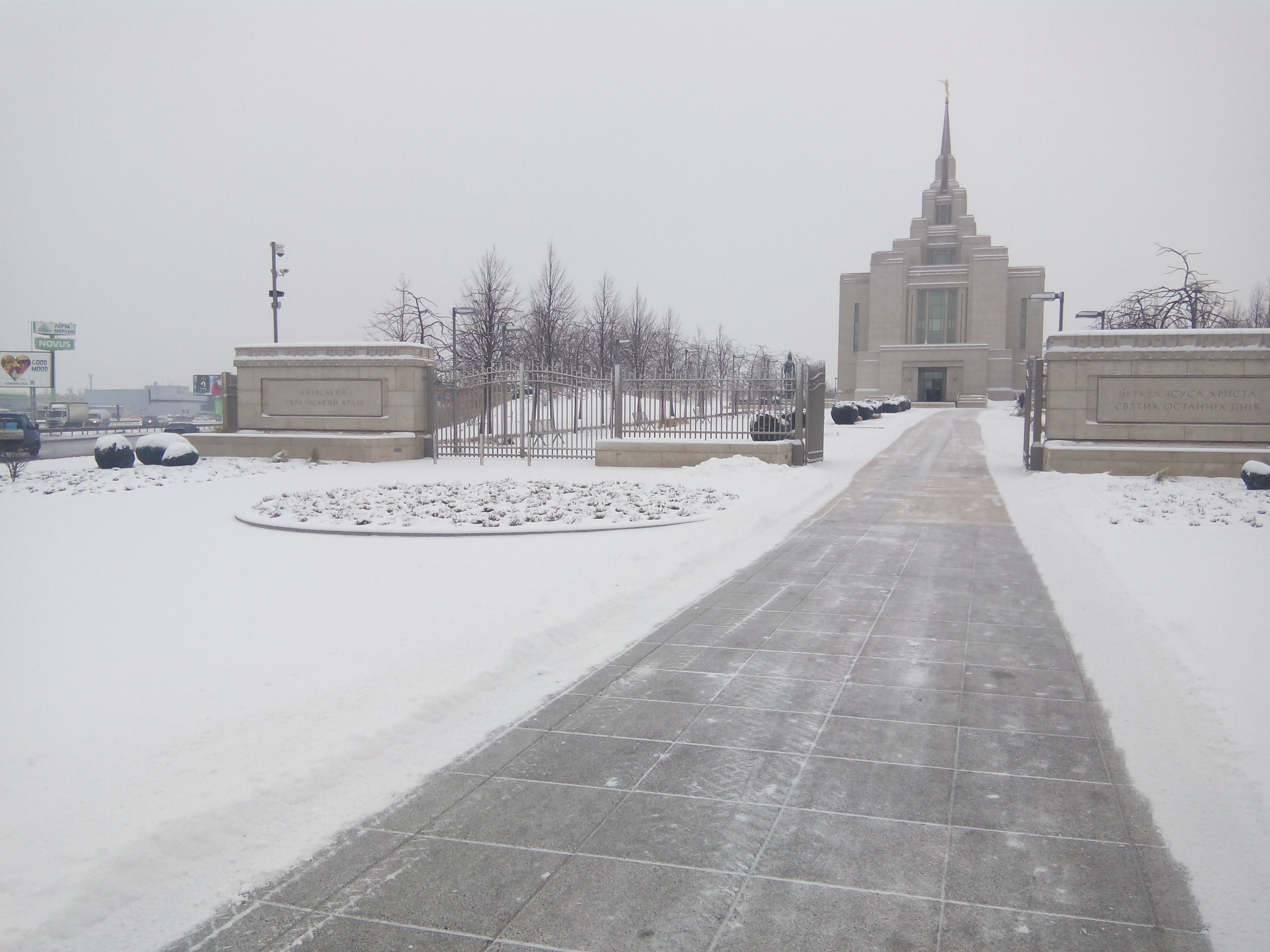

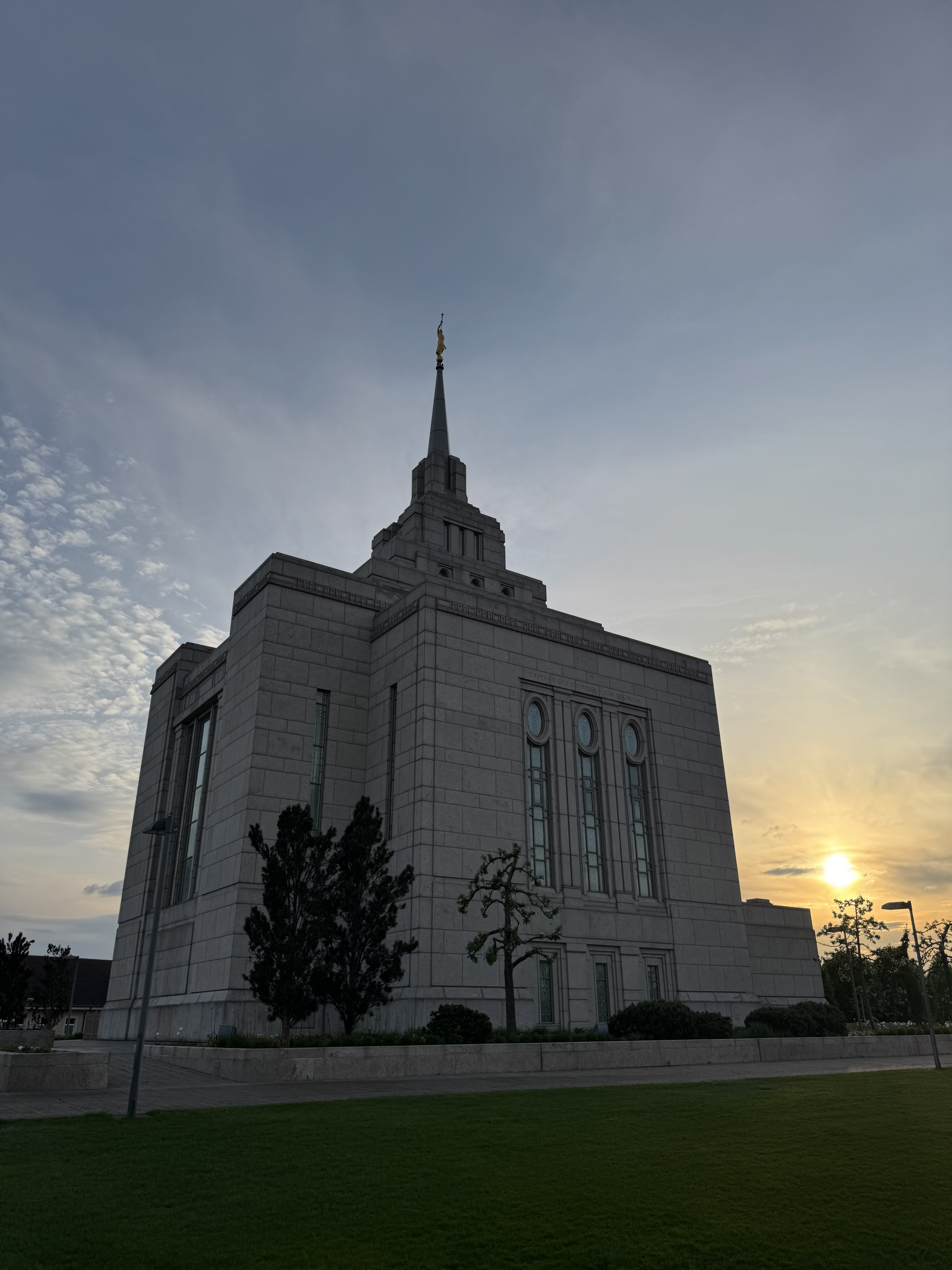

== See also ==
- Comparison of temples (LDS Church)
- List of temples (LDS Church)
- List of temples by geographic region (LDS Church)
- Temple architecture (LDS Church)
- The Church of Jesus Christ of Latter-day Saints in Ukraine
