= Guatemala City Guatemala Temple =

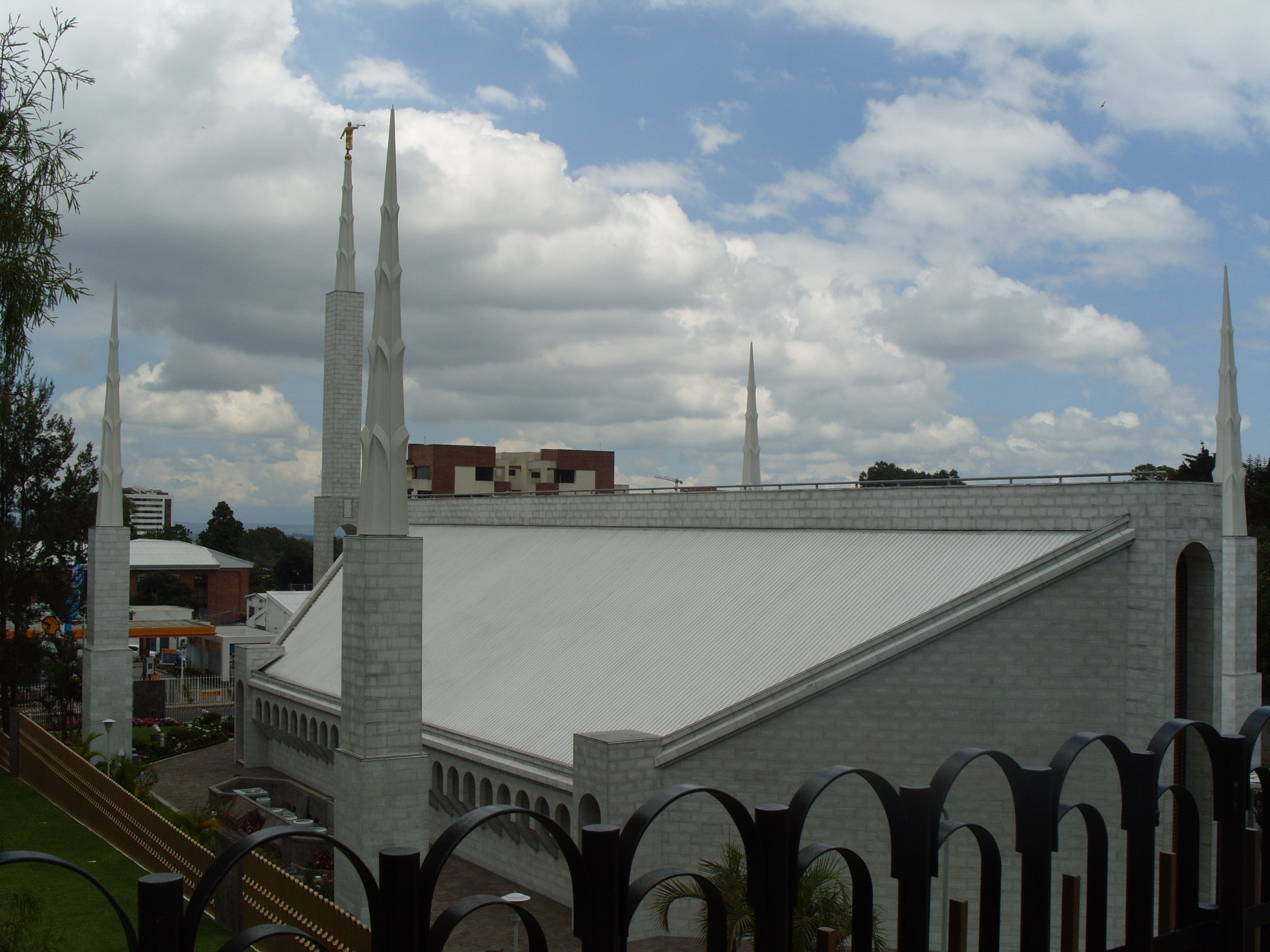
- Interactive map of Guatemala City Guatemala Temple
- Number: 32
- Dedication: 14 December 1984, by Gordon B. Hinckley
- Site: 1.4 acres (0.57 ha)
- Floor area: 11,610 ft^{2} (1,079 m^{2})
- Height: 126 ft (38 m)
- Official website • News & images

Church chronology
← Taipei Taiwan Temple	Guatemala City Guatemala Temple	→ Freiberg Germany Temple

Additional information
- Announced: 1 April 1981, by Spencer W. Kimball
- Groundbreaking: 12 September 1982, by Richard G. Scott
- Open house: 27 November – 10 December 1984
- Current president: Hugo Valenzuela Ovando
- Designed by: Church A&E Services and Jose Asturias
- Location: Guatemala City, Guatemala
- Coordinates: 14°35′0.2004″N 90°29′8.1672″W
- Exterior finish: Natural white Guatemalan marble
- Design: Modern adaptation of six-spire design
- Baptistries: 1
- Ordinance rooms: 4 (stationary)
- Sealing rooms: 3
- Clothing rental: Yes

The Guatemala City Guatemala Temple is a temple of the Church of Jesus Christ of Latter-day Saints in Guatemala City, Guatemala. The intent to construct the temple was announced on April 1, 1981, by church president Spencer W. Kimball. A groundbreaking was held on September 12, 1982, and when construction was completed, a public open house was held November 27 to December 10, 1984. The temple was dedicated in sessions held from December 14 to 16, 1984, by Gordon B. Hinckley, second counselor in the church's First Presidency. It was the church's first temple in Central America and became a regional landmark of the faith. A group of 75 Qʼeqchiʼ Latter-day Saints traveled for two days by foot, paddle boat, and bus to attend the dedication.

The temple is on a 1.43-acre site in Vista Hermosa 1, has six-spires, and an exterior of natural white Guatemalan marble. The interior has four ordinance rooms, three sealing rooms, and a baptistry.

== History ==
Church president Spencer W. Kimball announced a temple for Guatemala City on April 1, 1981, during a press conference on Temple Square, three days before general conference. The site in the Vista Hermosa 1 neighborhood (24 Avenida 2-20, Zona 15) had been acquired about two decades earlier by a mission president, John F. O'Donnal, anticipating a future temple. Ground was broken on September 12, 1982, with Richard G. Scott of the Seventy presiding. An estimated 4,000 people attended the groundbreaking. After construction, a public open house ran from November 27–December 10, 1984, with about 24,200 visitors touring the building.

The temple—Central America's first—was dedicated in ten sessions hed from December 14 to 16, 1984, by Gordon B. Hinckley, then second counselor in the First Presidency. Approximately 9,100 members from the temple district attended. Among them were 75 members of the Guatemalan indigenous people, the Q'eqchi' (Kekchi), who traveled for two days to participate, including by foot, paddle boat, and bus.

In 2020, like all the church's others, the Guatemala City Guatemala Temple was closed for a time in response to the COVID-19 pandemic.

=== Design and architecture ===
The temple has six detached spires and an exterior of natural white Guatemalan marble.

Located on a 1.43-acre property in Vista Hermosa 1, the grounds has landscaping with trees and grass. The temple contains four ordinance rooms, three sealing rooms, and a baptistry.

== Temple leadership and admittance ==
The church's temples are directed by a temple president and matron, each typically serving for a term of three years. The president and matron oversee the administration of temple operations and provide guidance and training for both temple patrons and staff. Beginning service in 1984, John F. O'Donnal, who had originally purchased the property with the intent for a future temple, was the first president, while Carmen G. O'Donnal served as matron. As of 2024, Hugo V. Ovando is the president, with Vilma C. de Valenzuela serving as matron.

A public open house was held before its 1984 dedication. Like all the church's temples, it is not used for Sunday worship services. To members of the church, temples are regarded as sacred houses of the Lord. Once dedicated, only church members with a current temple recommend can enter for worship.

== See also ==

Temples in and near Guatemala
= Operating
= Under construction
= Announced
= Temporarily Closed

- Comparison of temples of The Church of Jesus Christ of Latter-day Saints
- List of temples of The Church of Jesus Christ of Latter-day Saints
- List of temples of The Church of Jesus Christ of Latter-day Saints by geographic region
- Temple architecture (Latter-day Saints)
- The Church of Jesus Christ of Latter-day Saints in Guatemala
