= List of presidents of Brigham Young University–Idaho =

The following people have served as principals or presidents of Brigham Young University-Idaho, also known as the Bannock Stake Academy (1888–1903), Ricks Academy (1903–1917), Ricks Normal College (1917–1923), and Ricks College (1923–2000).

Image	Name	Years	Title	School Name
	Jacob Spori	1888–1891	Principal	Bannock Stake Academy
	Charles N. Watkins	1891–1894	Principal	Bannock Stake Academy
	George Cole	1894–1899	Principal	Bannock Stake Academy
	Douglas M. Todd	1899–1901	Principal	Bannock Stake Academy
	Ezra C. Dalby	1901–1914	Principal	Bannock Stake Academy (1901–1903)
	Ezra C. Dalby	1901–1914	Principal	Ricks Academy (1903–1914)
	Andrew B. Christenson	1914–1917	Principal	Ricks Academy
	George S. Romney	1917–1931	President	Ricks Normal College (1917–1923)
	George S. Romney	1917–1931	President	Ricks College (1923–1931)
	Hyrum Manwaring	1931–1944	President	Ricks College
	John L. Clarke	1944–1971	President	Ricks College
	Henry B. Eyring	1971–1977	President	Ricks College
	Bruce C. Hafen	1978–1985	President	Ricks College
	Joe J. Christensen	1985–1989	President	Ricks College
	Steven D. Bennion	1989–1997	President	Ricks College
	David A. Bednar	1997–2004	President	Ricks College (1997–2001)
	David A. Bednar	1997–2004	President	Brigham Young University–Idaho (2001–2004)
	Robert M. Wilkes	2004–2005	Interim President	Brigham Young University–Idaho
	Kim B. Clark	2005–2015	President	Brigham Young University–Idaho
	Clark Gilbert	2015–2017	President	Brigham Young University–Idaho
	Henry J. Eyring	2017–2023	President	Brigham Young University–Idaho
	Alvin F. Meredith III	2023–present	President	Brigham Young University–Idaho
