= BYU (disambiguation) =

BYU or Brigham Young University is a university in Provo, Utah, United States.

BYU or Byu may also refer to:

- BYU Cougars, the university's athletic program
- Bindlacher Berg Airport's IATA airport code
- Buyang language's ISO-639 code
- Byu, short for "Bayou"; a Street suffix as used in the US

== See also ==
- Brigham Young University Jerusalem Center, a satellite campus in Jerusalem
- Brigham Young University–Hawaii, a sister school in Laie, Hawaii, United States
- Brigham Young University–Idaho, a sister school in Rexburg, Idaho, United States
- BYU–Pathway Worldwide, an online education program accredited through Brigham Young University–Idaho
