= Joe J. Christensen =

American general authority (1929–2021)

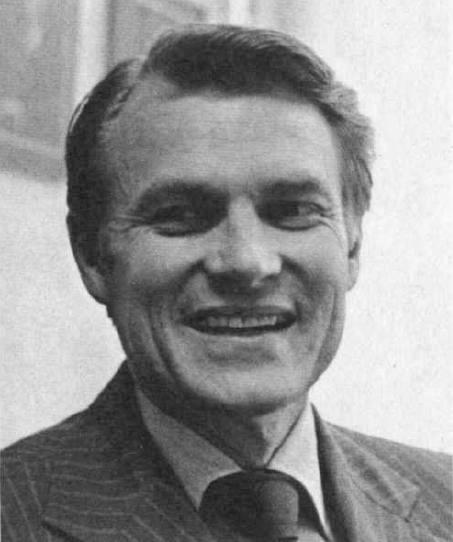

First Quorum of the Seventy
- April 1, 1989 – October 2, 1999
- Called by: Ezra Taft Benson
- End reason: Granted general authority emeritus status

Presidency of the Seventy
- August 15, 1993 – August 15, 1999
- Called by: Ezra Taft Benson
- End reason: Honorably released

Emeritus General Authority
- October 2, 1999 – May 18, 2021
- Called by: Gordon B. Hinckley

Personal details
- Born: Joe Junior Christensen; July 21, 1929; Banida, Idaho, U.S.
- Died: May 18, 2021 (aged 91); Salt Lake City, Utah, U.S.

Joe Junior Christensen (July 21, 1929 – May 18, 2021) was a president of Ricks College (1985 to 1989) and a general authority in the Church of Jesus Christ of Latter-day Saints (LDS Church) from 1989 until his death. He was also president of the San Diego California Temple from 1999 to 2002.

Christensen served as an officer in the United States Air Force during the Korean War, from 1953 to 1955. He received a bachelor's degree from Brigham Young University and a Ph.D. from Washington State University.

Christensen then became an institute director for the Church Educational System (CES), including at the University of Utah for a time.

For a few months in 1970, Christensen served as president of the LDS Church's mission headquartered in Mexico City. However, he was appointed to work under Neal A. Maxwell, who was the Commissioner of Church Education, in running the church's seminaries and institutes and was replaced as mission president. Christensen was an associate commissioner in CES from 1970 to 1985, interrupted by a four-year term as president of the LDS Church's Missionary Training Center in Provo, Utah. As associate commissioner he led the expansion of the seminaries and institutes program, especially internationally in the 1970s. One major development he oversaw was recruiting local church members to lead the program in most countries.

In 1975 he became the founding president of the Association of Latter-day Saint Counselors and Psychotherapists (AMCAP).

Starting in 1977, under the leadership of Henry B. Eyring, Christensen continued to oversee seminaries and institutes, while adding responsibility for continuing education programs and primary and secondary schools the church had in eight countries in Polynesia and Latin America. In 1985, Christensen became president of Ricks College in Rexburg, Idaho.

In 1989, Christensen was called as a general authority in the LDS Church where, among other assignments, he served in the Presidency of the Seventy. He was designated as an emeritus general authority in 1999.

Christensen died on May 18, 2021, in Salt Lake City.

== Speeches ==
- "Resolutions"
- "Powerful Truths That Make a Difference in Our Lives"
- "On Making Revelation a Personal Reality"
- "The Responsibility of Our Heritage"

Academic offices
Preceded by Bruce C. Hafen	President of Ricks College; 1985—1989	Succeeded by Steven D. Bennion
