= David A. Bednar =

American educator and religious leader (born 1952)

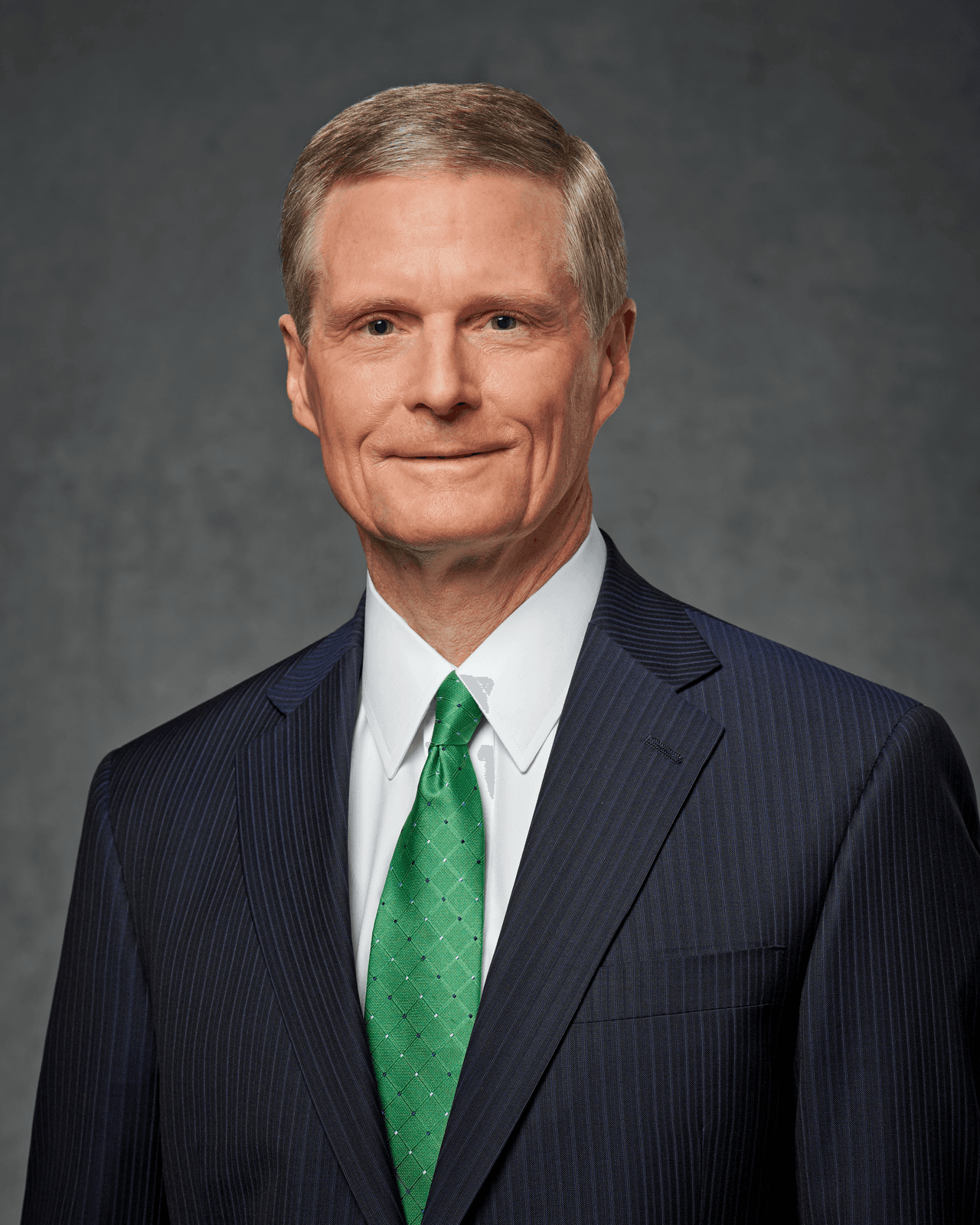

Quorum of the Twelve Apostles
- October 2, 2004

LDS Church Apostle
- October 7, 2004
- Reason: Death of David B. Haight.

14th President of Brigham Young University–Idaho

In office
- July 1, 1997 – December 1, 2004
- Successor: Kim B. Clark

Personal details
- Born: David Allan Bednar; June 15, 1952 (age 74); Oakland, California, U.S.
- Alma mater: Brigham Young University (BA, MA); Purdue University (PhD)
- Spouse(s): Susan Kae Robinson (m. 1975)
- Children: 3

David Allan Bednar (born June 15, 1952) is an American religious leader and member of the Quorum of the Twelve Apostles of the Church of Jesus Christ of Latter-day Saints (LDS Church). A former educator, Bednar was president of Brigham Young University–Idaho (BYU–Idaho) from 1997 to 2004.

Bednar was sustained as a member of the Quorum of the Twelve on October 2, 2004. 52 years old at the time of his call, he was the youngest man named to that body since Dallin H. Oaks in 1984. He was ordained an apostle on October 7, 2004, by church president Gordon B. Hinckley. Bednar and Dieter F. Uchtdorf were called to fill the vacancies created by the July 2004 deaths of quorum members David B. Haight and Neal A. Maxwell. As a member of the Quorum of the Twelve, Bednar is recognized by the church as a prophet, seer, and revelator. He is currently the fourth most senior apostle in the church.

== Life and career ==
Bednar was born in Oakland, California to Lavina Whitney Bednar and Anthony George Bednar. His mother came from a long line of Latter-day Saints, but his father did not join the church until Bednar was in his late twenties. He served as a full-time missionary in Southern Germany and then attended Brigham Young University, where he received a Bachelor of Arts degree in communication in 1976 and a Master of Arts degree in organizational communication in 1977. He received a doctorate degree in organizational behavior from Purdue University in 1980.

From 1980 to 1984, Bednar was an assistant professor of management at the University of Arkansas College of Business Administration (now Sam M. Walton College of Business). He was an assistant professor of management at Texas Tech University from 1984 to 1986. He returned to the University of Arkansas in 1987, serving as the Associate Dean for Graduate Studies in the Sam M. Walton College of Business until 1992, and was then the director of the Management Decision-Making Lab from 1992 to 1997. In 1994, he was recognized as the outstanding teacher at the University of Arkansas and received the Burlington Northern Foundation Award for Excellence in Teaching. He was twice the recipient of the Outstanding Teacher Award in the College of Business Administration.

Bednar served as the president of Ricks College/BYU–Idaho in Rexburg, Idaho, from July 1, 1997, to December 1, 2004. There, he oversaw and managed the transition of the school from, what was at the time, the largest private junior college in the United States, Ricks College, to a four-year university, BYU–Idaho.

In 2016, CNN reported on a response by Bednar to a question about how homosexual members of the church can remain committed to the gospel. Bednar reframed the question, stating that "there are no homosexual members of the church" and that individuals are not defined by sexual attraction or behavior, but as children of God.

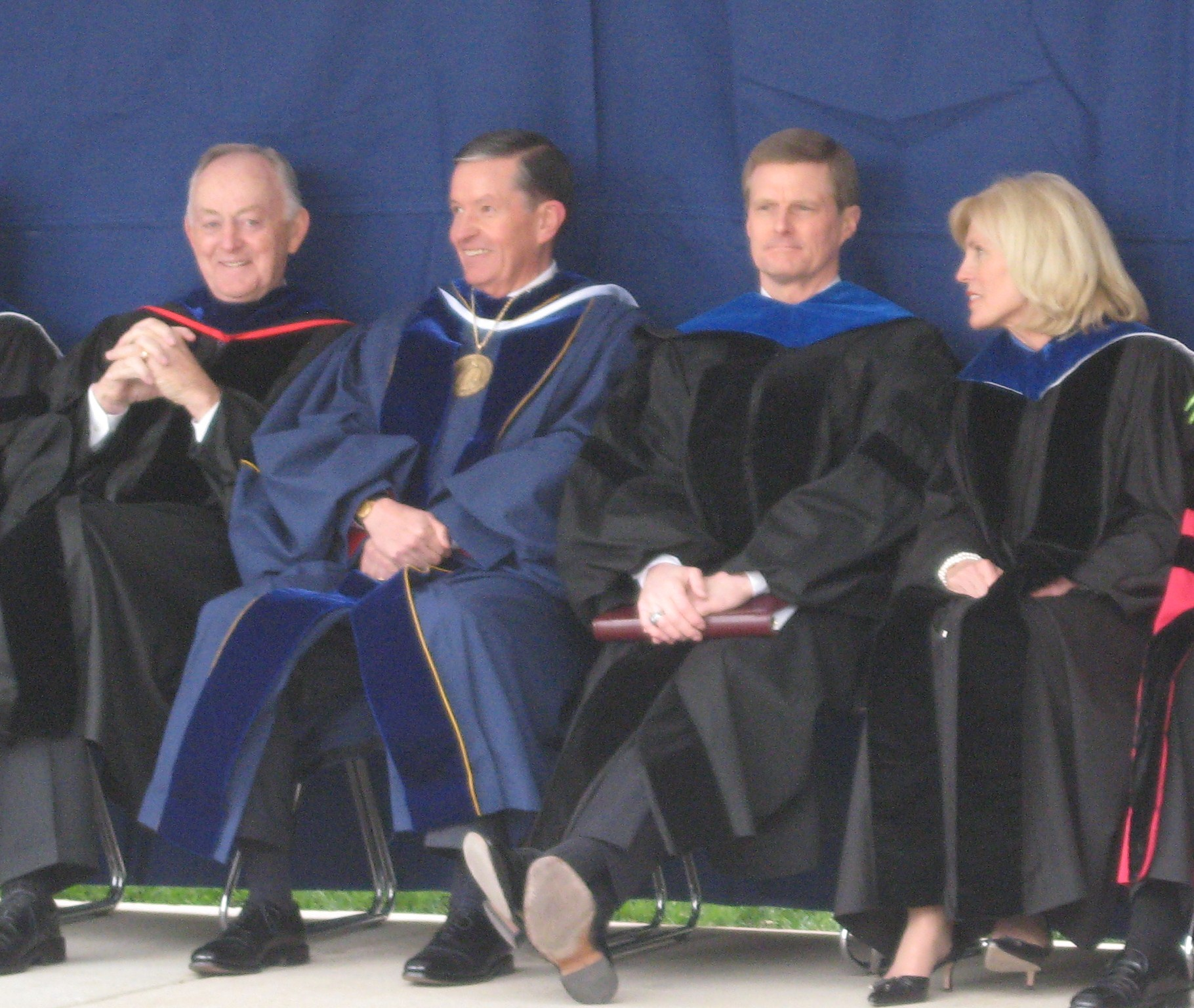
Bednar at the April 2008 BYU Commencement with Cecil O. Samuelson, Elaine S. Dalton, and W. Rolfe Kerr

== LDS Church service ==
Bednar has served in the LDS Church as a bishop (Fayetteville Ward, 1987), twice as stake president (Fort Smith Arkansas Stake, 1987–1991 and Rogers Arkansas Stake, 1991–1995), regional representative (1994–95), and area seventy (1997–2004).

In 2016, Bednar dedicated the Star Valley Wyoming Temple, the LDS Church's 154th temple.

Bednar attended the 2019 dedication of the Rome Italy Temple with all 15 of the LDS Church apostles. This is believed to be the first time the entire First Presidency and Quorum of the Twelve Apostles were in the same location outside the United States.

Bednar addressed the National Press Club in Washington, D.C., on May 26, 2022.

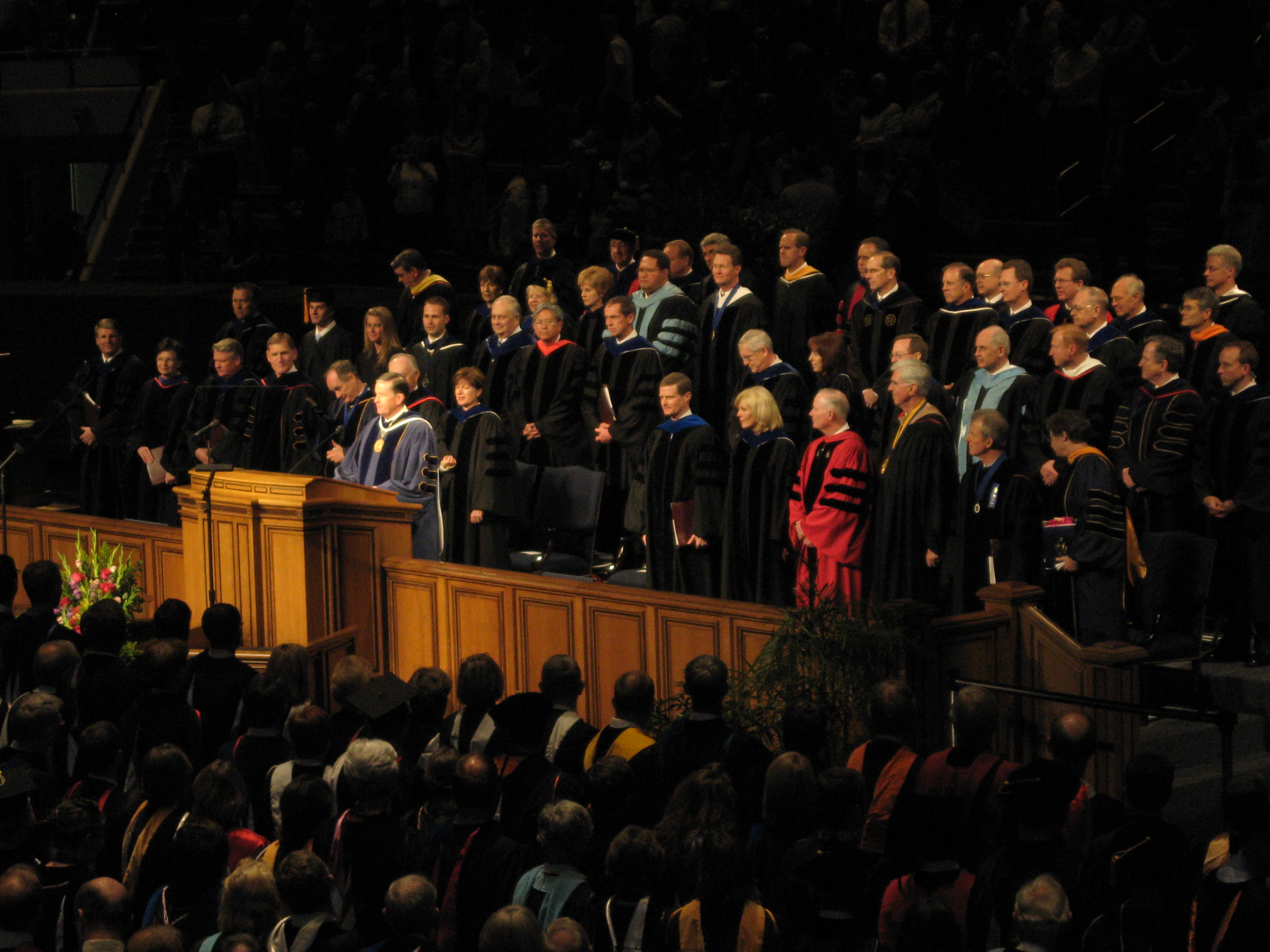
Bednar at the April 2008 BYU graduation ceremony

== Personal life ==
Bednar married Susan Kae Robinson in the Salt Lake Temple on March 20, 1975. They are the parents of three sons.

== Works ==
Books

- White, Donald D.; Bednar, David A. (1991), Organizational Behavior: Understanding and Managing People at Work, Allyn & Bacon, ISBN 0-205-12851-3
- Sims, Ronald R.; White, Donald D.; Bednar, David A. (1992), Readings in Organizational Behavior, Allyn & Bacon, ISBN 0-205-12857-2
- Bednar, David A. (2011), Increase in Learning, Deseret Book Company, ISBN 978-1-60908-943-6
- Bednar, David A. (2012), Act in Doctrine, Deseret Book Company, ISBN 978-1-60907-227-8
- Bednar, David A. (2014), Power to Become: Spiritual Patterns for Pressing Forward with a Steadfastness in Christ, Deseret Book Company, ISBN 978-1-60907-859-1
- Bednar, David A. (2017), One by One, Deseret Book Company, ISBN 978-1-62972-382-2

Academic articles

- Bednar, David A; Roach, David W (1997), "The Theory of Logical Types: A Tool for Understanding Levels and Types of Change in Organizations", Human Relations, 50 (6), SAGE Publications: 671–699, doi:10.1177/001872679705000603, OCLC 437562507, S2CID 145575927
- Reeves, Carol A; Bednar, David A (1996), "Keys to Market Success -- A Response and Another View", Journal of Retail Banking, 18 (4), Arlington, VA: Consumer Bankers Association in cooperation with the McIntire School of Commerce, University of Virginia: 33, OCLC 91490898
- Bednar, David A; Reeves, Carol A; Lawrence, R Cayce (1995), "The Role of Technology in Banking -- Listen to the Customer", Journal of Retail Banking, 17 (3), Arlington, VA: Consumer Bankers Association in cooperation with the McIntire School of Commerce, University of Virginia: 35, OCLC 91801203
- Reeves, Carol A; Bednar, David A (1995), "Quality as Symphony", The Cornell Hotel and Restaurant Administration Quarterly, 36 (3), Ithaca, NY: School of Hotel Administration, Cornell University: 72–79, doi:10.1177/001088049503600323, OCLC 87629925, S2CID 154158411
- Reeves, Carol A; Bednar, David A (July 1994), "Defining Quality: Alternatives and Implications", Academy of Management Review, 19 (3): 419–445, doi:10.5465/amr.1994.9412271805, JSTOR 258934, OCLC 482675183
- White, Donald D.; Bednar, David A. (Winter 1984), "Locating problems with quality circles", National Productivity Review, 4 (1): 45–52, doi:10.1002/npr.4040040106, OCLC 4663049108
- Bednar, David A.; Curington, William P. (April 1983), "Interaction Analysis: A Tool for Understanding Negotiations", Industrial and Labor Relations Review, 36 (3): 389–401, doi:10.2307/2523018, JSTOR 2523018, OCLC 424819759
- Bednar, David A (Fall 1982), "Relationships between Communicator Style and Managerial Performance in Complex Organizations: A Field Study", Journal of Business Communication, 19 (4): 51–76, doi:10.1177/002194368201900404, OCLC 424921115, S2CID 146548462

== Selected speeches ==
—— (2001), "In the Strength of the Lord", BYU Speeches —— (2005), "Quick to Observe", BYU Speeches —— (2007), "Reservoir of Living Water", BYU Speeches —— (2009), "Things as They Really Are", BYU Speeches —— (2010), "Watching with All Perseverance", BYU Speeches —— (2011), "The Spirit of Revelation", BYU Speeches —— (2012), "That They Might Have Joy", BYU Speeches —— (2013), "Meek and Lowly of Heart", BYU Speeches —— (2014), "Bear Up Their Burdens with Ease", BYU Speeches —— (2015), "Accepting the Lord’s Will and Timing", BYU Speeches —— (2016), "Learning to Love Learning", BYU Speeches —— (2017), "Walk in the Meekness of My Spirit", BYU Speeches —— (2019), "Watchful unto Prayer Continually", BYU Speeches —— (2020), "Look unto Me in Every Thought; Doubt Not, Fear Not", BYU Speeches —— (2022), "Consider the Wondrous Works of God", BYU Speeches —— (2024), "The Wonderful Flood of Light", BYU Speeches —— (2025), "The World Shall Stand", BYU Speeches

== Awards ==
- Burlington Northern Foundation Award for Excellence in Teaching (1994)

== See also ==
- Council on the Disposition of the Tithes

The Church of Jesus Christ of Latter-day Saints titles
Preceded by Dieter F. Uchtdorf	Quorum of the Twelve Apostles; October 2, 2004 –	Succeeded by Quentin L. Cook
Academic offices
Preceded by Steven D. Bennion as President of Ricks College	President of Brigham Young University–Idaho; August 10, 2001 – December 1, 2004	Succeeded by Robert M. Wilkes as interim President (2004–05); Kim B. Clark as President of Brigham Young; University–Idaho (2005–2015)
Preceded by Steven D. Bennion as President of Ricks College	President of Ricks College; July 1, 1997 – August 10, 2001	Succeeded by Robert M. Wilkes as interim President (2004–05); Kim B. Clark as President of Brigham Young; University–Idaho (2005–2015)
