= List of Brigham Young University–Idaho buildings =

This list of Brigham Young University–Idaho buildings catalogs the current and no-longer-existent structures of Brigham Young University–Idaho (BYU–Idaho), a private university owned by the Church of Jesus Christ of Latter-day Saints (LDS Church) located in Rexburg, Idaho, United States.

== Academic facilities ==
Building	Abbr.	Image	Yr. Occ.	Notes	Reference
Agriculture Engineering Building	AGM		1978		"Agricultural Mechanics Building: Buildings of Ricks College and BYU-Idaho Exhibit". Archived from the original on October 1, 2011.
Austin (Mark) Technical & Engineering Building	AUS		1969		"Austin Building: Buildings of Ricks College and BYU-Idaho Exhibit". Archived from the original on July 26, 2011.
Benson (Ezra Taft) Agricultural & Biological Sciences Building	BEN		1975		"Benson Building: Buildings of Ricks College and BYU-Idaho Exhibit". Archived from the original on October 1, 2011.
BYU-Idaho Center	BCTR		2010		"BYU-Idaho Center". Archived from the original on February 6, 2011.
Biddulph (Lowell G.) Hall	BID		1963	Offices	https://web.archive.org/web/20100821202233/http://www.lib.byui.edu/exhibits/buildings/dorms-home.html
Chapman (Verla L.) Hall	CHP		1971	Offices	https://web.archive.org/web/20100821202233/http://www.lib.byui.edu/exhibits/buildings/dorms-home.html
Clarke (John L.) Building	CLK		1975		"Clarke Building: Buildings of Ricks College and BYU-Idaho Exhibit". Archived from the original on February 8, 2011.
Construction Management Lab	CML				
Engineering Technology Center	ETC		1975	Formerly the Auxiliary Services Building. Rededicated in 2022.	Rededicated:https://www.eastidahonews.com/2022/10/three-new-buildings-dedicated-at-byu-idaho/
Hinckley (Gordon B.) Building	HIN		2002		"Multi-Use Building: Buildings of Ricks College and BYU-Idaho Exhibit". Archived from the original on October 1, 2011.
Lamprecht (Helen) Hall	LAM		1971	Offices	https://web.archive.org/web/20100821202233/http://www.lib.byui.edu/exhibits/buildings/dorms-home.html
Livestock Center	LC		1979–1980		"Department of Animal Science -BYU-Idaho".
McKay (David O.) Library	MCK		1963		"McKay Library: Buildings of Ricks College and BYU-Idaho Exhibit". Archived from the original on October 1, 2011.
Radio and Graphic Services Building	RGS		2000		"Radio and Graphic Services Building: Buildings of Ricks College and BYU-Idaho Exhibit". Archived from the original on July 26, 2011.
Ricks (Thomas E.) Building	RKS		2004		"Ricks Building: Buildings of Ricks College and BYU-Idaho Exhibit". Archived from the original on July 26, 2011.
Rigby (William F.) Hall	RIG		1963	faculty offices	"Residence Halls: Buildings of Ricks College and BYU-Idaho Exhibit". Archived from the original on August 21, 2010.
Romney (George S.) Sciences Building	ROM		1963		"Romney Building: Buildings of Ricks College and BYU-Idaho Exhibit". Archived from the original on July 26, 2011.
Smith (Joseph Fielding) Building	SMI		1968		"Smith Building: Buildings of Ricks College and BYU-Idaho Exhibit". Archived from the original on July 26, 2011.
Snow (Eliza R.) Performing Arts Center	SNO		1980		"Snow Building: Buildings of Ricks College and BYU-Idaho Exhibit". Archived from the original on October 1, 2011.
Spori (Jacob) Building	SPO		2003		"New Spori Building: Buildings of Ricks College and BYU-Idaho Exhibit". Archived from the original on October 1, 2011.
Science and Technology Center	STC		2017		"BYU-Idaho Science and Technology Center presents new opportunities to students"
Stadium Studio	STU				
Taylor (John) Building	TAY		1997		"Taylor Building: Buildings of Ricks College and BYU-Idaho Exhibit". Archived from the original on July 26, 2011.
Visual Arts Studio	VAS		2022		https://www.eastidahonews.com/2022/10/three-new-buildings-dedicated-at-byu-idaho/

== Administrative buildings ==
Building	Abbr.	Image	Yr. Occ.	Notes	Reference
Alumni & Friends Visitors' Center, 16 E Main Street	ALM		2003		https://web.archive.org/web/20101020072214/http://www.byui.edu/alumni/summit/fall_2003/alumninews.htm
Kimball (Spencer W.) Building:	KIM		1999		https://web.archive.org/web/20110726044321/http://www.lib.byui.edu/exhibits/buildings/kimball-home.html

== Athletic and outdoor recreation facilities ==
Building	Abbr.	Image	Yr. Occ.	Notes	Reference
7th South Activity Fields					
Badger Creek Outdoor Learning Center, near Tetonia	BC1				
Baseball Diamond	BBD				
BYU-Idaho Center					
BYU-Idaho Stadium	STA		1980		https://web.archive.org/web/20111001132109/http://www.lib.byui.edu/exhibits/buildings/unnamed/stadium.html
Hart (John W.) Physical Education Building	HRT		1969		https://web.archive.org/web/20111001132123/http://www.lib.byui.edu/exhibits/buildings/hart-home.html
Henry's Fork Outdoor Learning Center, 5400 W Hwy 33	HFC				
Lower East Field	LEF				
Lower West Field	LWF				
Outdoor Rental Center	ORC				
Ricks (Thomas E.) Memorial Gardens	TRG		1977		http://www.byui.edu/horticulture/norman%20work/gardens.htm
Ropes Course					
Skating Rink	SKR				
Stadium Track and Field	STF				
Tennis Courts, Lower	TCL				
Tennis Courts, Upper	TCU				
Teton Mountain Lodge, near Victor	TML				
Upper Playfield	UP				
West Soccer Field	WSF				

== Auxiliary buildings ==
Building	Abbr.	Image	Yr. Occ.	Notes	Reference
Manwaring (Hyrum) Student Center	MC		1966	University Store, Food Services	https://web.archive.org/web/20110726044414/http://www.lib.byui.edu/exhibits/buildings/manwaring-home.html
Student Health & Counseling Center	SHC		2004		http://www.byui.edu/CampusConstruction/healthcenter.htm

== Physical Plant buildings ==
Building	Abbr.	Image	Yr. Occ.	Notes	Reference
Heating Plant	HTG		1963		https://web.archive.org/web/20110726044427/http://www.lib.byui.edu/exhibits/buildings/unnamed/heat.html
Physical Plant Grounds Construction & Sign Shop	PPG				
Physical Plant Office Building	PPO		1972		https://web.archive.org/web/20111001132252/http://www.lib.byui.edu/exhibits/buildings/unnamed/ppl.html
Physical Plant Shop Building	PPS		1972		https://web.archive.org/web/20111001132252/http://www.lib.byui.edu/exhibits/buildings/unnamed/ppl.html
Plumbing & Welding Shop	PWS				
Vehicle Operations Service Station	VOS				

== Residential buildings ==
Residential buildings at Brigham Young University–Idaho include:

Building	Abbr.	Image	Yr. Occ.	Notes	Reference
University Village	UV		2004	family housing	https://web.archive.org/web/20100926092244/http://www.byui.edu/alumni/summit/fall_2004/Married.htm
Center Square	CS1, CS2, CS3		2015		https://www.eastidahonews.com/2015/09/new-on-campus-centre-square-apartments-dedicated/
University Village Community Center	UVCC		2022		https://www.eastidahonews.com/2022/10/three-new-buildings-dedicated-at-byu-idaho/

== Former buildings ==
Building	Abbr.	Image	Yr. Occ.	Yr. Vac.	Notes	References
Auxiliary Services Building	ASB		1975	Rededicated as the Engineering Technology Center (ETC) in 2022		https://web.archive.org/web/20110726044402/http://www.lib.byui.edu/exhibits/buildings/unnamed/asb.html Rededicated:https://www.eastidahonews.com/2022/10/three-new-buildings-dedicated-at-byu-idaho/
Kirkham (Oscar A.) Building	KRK		1956	2019		"Kirkham Building: Buildings of Ricks College and BYU-Idaho Exhibit". Archived from the original on February 20, 2011. Demolition:https://photo.byui.edu/kirkhamdemolition
Barnes (Sarah Ann) Hall	BRN		1965	2016	women	https://web.archive.org/web/20100821202233/https://web.archive.org/web/20100821202233/http://www.lib.byui.edu/exhibits/buildings/dorms-home.html Demolition:https://www.rexburgstandardjournal.com/news/local/byu-idaho-women-s-dorms-demolished/collection_2a238dfe-189e-11e6-a566-73578d33700b.html
Kerr (Annie S.) Hall	KER		1963	2016	women	https://web.archive.org/web/20100821202233/https://web.archive.org/web/20100821202233/http://www.lib.byui.edu/exhibits/buildings/dorms-home.html Demolition:https://www.rexburgstandardjournal.com/news/local/byu-idaho-women-s-dorms-demolished/collection_2a238dfe-189e-11e6-a566-73578d33700b.html
Perkins (Virginia H.) Hall	PER		1963	2016	women	https://web.archive.org/web/20100821202233/https://web.archive.org/web/20100821202233/http://www.lib.byui.edu/exhibits/buildings/dorms-home.html Demolition:https://www.rexburgstandardjournal.com/news/local/byu-idaho-women-s-dorms-demolished/collection_2a238dfe-189e-11e6-a566-73578d33700b.html
Ricks (Edna I.) Hall	RIC		1965	2016	women	https://web.archive.org/web/20100821202233/https://web.archive.org/web/20100821202233/http://www.lib.byui.edu/exhibits/buildings/dorms-home.html Demolition:https://www.rexburgstandardjournal.com/news/local/byu-idaho-women-s-dorms-demolished/collection_2a238dfe-189e-11e6-a566-73578d33700b.html
Old Gym (B-2) Building	B-2		1918			https://web.archive.org/web/20111001132300/http://www.lib.byui.edu/exhibits/buildings/old-gym-home.html
Spori (Jacob) Building	SPO		1903			https://web.archive.org/web/20111001132305/http://www.lib.byui.edu/exhibits/buildings/spori-home.html

== Notes ==
- Blank cells indicate missing information
- "Abbr." = abbreviation; "Yr. Occ." = Year occupied; "Yr. Vac." = Year vacated
