= Steven D. Bennion =

American academic (born 1941)

Steven Don Bennion (born August 17, 1941) has served as president of Snow College, Ricks College, and Southern Utah University.

== Personal life ==
Bennion was born and raised in Salt Lake City, Utah to educator Lowell L. Bennion and Merle Colton. Bennion is the grandson of prominent Utah educator Milton Bennion, who served as the first president of what would later become Southern Utah University.

Bennion served a mission for the Church of Jesus Christ of Latter-day Saints (LDS Church) in Scotland and earned a bachelor's degree from the University of Utah. He married Marjorie Hopkins in the Salt Lake Temple in 1963. They would go on to have five kids. Bennion went to Cornell University where he earned an MPA degree.

Following this he worked for the state of Wisconsin and then the University of Wisconsin-Madison in budget positions. He also received a Ph.D. from the University of Wisconsin-Madison in 1977.

== Career ==
In 1979, Bennion became the Marketing Director for Church Welfare Services. He was promoted to Utah Associate Commissioner of Higher Education in 1981.

Bennion served as president of Snow College from 1982 to 1989. While Bennion was president of Snow College, the Career Center and honors program were started, as was the Snow College Foundation.

Bennion then began his tenure as president of Ricks College in 1989. Some initiatives during his presidency at Ricks included preparing the college for the future as computer access for students was expanded. The "fast track" program was developed to allow more students to attend. As a result of that program, student enrollment increased to 8,250 students. The John Taylor Building, the first new building on campus in 17 years, was constructed during his tenure.

Bennion left Ricks College in 1997 to become the president of Southern Utah University.

In 2006, Bennion left Southern Utah University to serve as president of the LDS Church's New York New York South Mission. He served as mission president until 2009.

In addition to being a mission president, Bennion has served in the LDS Church as a bishop and a member of a stake presidency. From 2013 to 2016, Bennion served as president of the Manhattan New York Temple.

Academic offices
Preceded by Joe J. Christensen	President of Ricks College; 1989—1997	Succeeded by David A. Bednar
