= Ezra C. Dalby =

American lawyer (1869–1934)

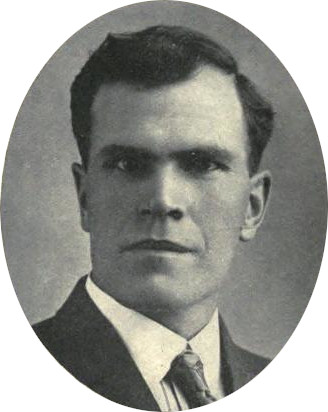
- Born: March 24, 1869; Ephraim, Utah
- Died: January 1, 1934 (aged 64); Salt Lake City, Utah
- Known for: Schoolteacher and principal in Idaho and Utah; first principal of Ricks Academy (predecessor of BYU-Idaho)

Ezra Christensen Dalby (March 24, 1869–January 1, 1934) was the president of the Bannock Stake/Ricks Academy from 1901 to 1914.

Dalby was born and raised in Ephraim, Utah. At birth his name was Ezra Christensen, he legally added Dalby later to avoid confusion with the many other Christensen families. He began his school at Sanpete Stake Academy (now Snow College) and then went to the University of Utah from which he graduated in 1891. He also studied at the University of Chicago. After his time as president of Ricks, Dalby received an L.L.D. degree from La Salle Extension University and an MA from the University of Utah in 1924.

In 1892, Dalby began work as principal of a school in Manti. He married Rosella "Zella" Anderson in 1894. From 1896 to 1898, Dalby served as a missionary for the Church of Jesus Christ of Latter-day Saints in Missouri.

In 1914, Dalby left Ricks to serve as the principal of Teton High School in Driggs, Idaho. Starting in 1918 he was a lawyer who based his practice in Driggs. In 1929, Dalby moved to Salt Lake City where he again was a school teacher and principal. Dalby wrote the book Land and Leaders of Israel: Lessons of the Old Testament which was published by Deseret Book Company in 1931.

Ezra and Zella Dalby were the parents of seven children.

== Sources ==
- BYU-Idaho bio of Dalby
- Jessica josie Rhodes. "Ezra Dalby: threat or Victim".

Academic offices
Preceded by Douglas M. Todd	Principal of Ricks Academy; 1903 - 1914	Succeeded by Andrew B. Christenson
Preceded by Douglas M. Todd	Principal of Bannock Stake Academy (became Ricks Academy in 1903); 1901 - 1903	Succeeded by Andrew B. Christenson
