= Kim B. Clark =

American academic

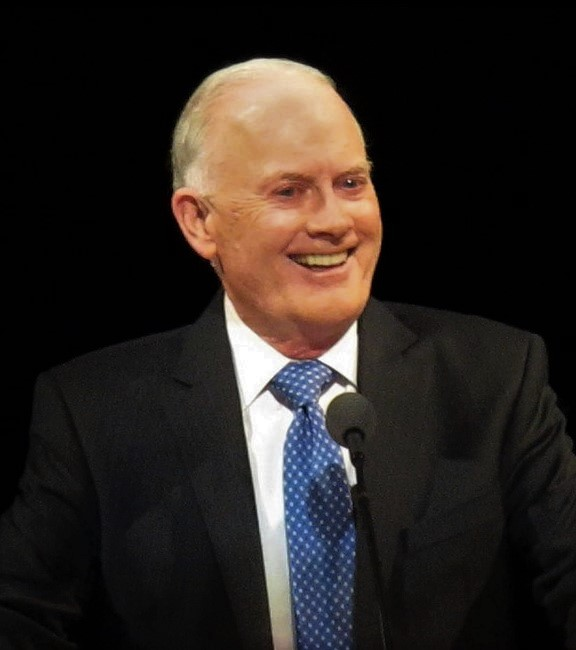

Emeritus general authority
- October 5, 2019

First Quorum of the Seventy
- April 4, 2015 – October 5, 2019
- Called by: Thomas S. Monson
- End reason: Designated as emeritus general authority

15th President of Brigham Young University–Idaho

In office
- August 19, 2005 – April 13, 2015
- Predecessor: David A. Bednar
- Successor: Clark Gilbert

Personal details
- Born: March 20, 1949 (age 77); Salt Lake City, Utah, U.S.
- Education: Harvard University (BA, MA, PhD)
- Spouse(s): Sue Lorraine Hunt Clark
- Children: 7

Kim Bryce Clark (born March 20, 1949) is an American scholar, educator, and religious leader who has been a general authority of the Church of Jesus Christ of Latter-day Saints (LDS Church) since April 2015, and was the church's seventeenth commissioner of church education from 2015 to 2019. He served previously as the fifteenth president of Brigham Young University–Idaho from 2005 to 2015, and as the dean of the Harvard Business School (HBS) from 1995 to 2005, where he was also the George F. Baker Professor of Business Administration.

== Early life and education ==
Kim B. Clark was born on March 20, 1949, in Salt Lake City, Utah. He and his family lived in Salt Lake City until 1960, when his father's new job required them to move to Spokane, Washington. Clark matriculated at Harvard University in 1967 as a pre-med major and left after his freshman year to serve as a missionary for the LDS Church in Germany. Following his mission, Clark enrolled for a time at Brigham Young University. In 1971, he resumed his studies at Harvard, where he received his BA (1974), MA (1977), and PhD (1978) in economics.

Clark joined the Harvard faculty in 1978 and served as dean of HBS from 1995 to 2005.

As a professor at HBS, Clark's research focused on modularity in design and the integration of technology and competition in industry evolution, particularly within the computer industry. He has published several articles in the Harvard Business Review and peer-reviewed academic journals. A few of his papers were co-authored with former HBS associate dean and former BYU-Hawaii president Steven C. Wheelwright.

With a variety of co-authors, Clark published an important series of studies on technological innovation. The organizational linkages, or integration, required to accomplish an innovation is a thread that runs through these studies. These insights culminated in his book with Carliss Baldwin, “Design Rules: The Power of Modularity,” which explores the rules for integrating components that shaped innovation in the computer industry as well as many others. His various articles and books have been cited more than 20,000 times according to Google Scholar.

In 2005, Clark left HBS when LDS Church president Gordon B. Hinckley appointed him president of BYU–Idaho.

On January 27, 2015, it was announced that effective April 13, 2015, Clark would be succeeded by Clark Gilbert as the president of BYU–Idaho.

== LDS Church service ==
Clark has served in various assignments in the LDS Church, including bishop, scout master, elders quorum president, Sunday school teacher, and counselor in a stake mission presidency. From 2007 to 2014, Clark served as an area seventy in the church's Idaho Area. On April 4, 2015, Clark was sustained as a member of the First Quorum of the Seventy. On August 1, 2015, he succeeded Paul V. Johnson as the commissioner of Church Education. He was designated as an emeritus general authority in October 2019.

== Personal life ==
Clark and his wife, Sue, are the parents of seven children.

== Awards ==
- Eagle Scout Award by the Boy Scouts of America
- Distinguished Eagle Scout Award by the National Eagle Scout Association
- Newcomen-Harvard Award for Best Paper Published in the Business History Review (1994)

== Works ==
- Abernathy, William J.; Clark, Kim B. (February 1985). "Innovation: Mapping the winds of creative destruction". Research Policy. 14 (1): 3–22. doi:10.1016/0048-7333(85)90021-6.
- Henderson, Rebecca M.; Clark, Kim B. (March 1990). "Architectural Innovation: The Reconfiguration of Existing Product Technologies and the Failure of Established Firms". Administrative Science Quarterly. 35 (1): 9. doi:10.2307/2393549. JSTOR 2393549.
- Iansiti, M.; Clark, K.B. (1995). "Integration and dynamic capability: Evidence from product development in automobiles and mainframe computers". Industrial and Corporate Change. 3 (3): 557–605. doi:10.1093/icc/3.3.557.
- Baldwin, C.Y. & Clark, K.B., 2000. Design Rules: The Power of Modularity. Cambridge MA: MIT Press.

== See also ==
- List of general authorities of The Church of Jesus Christ of Latter-day Saints
- Chronological Listing of Church Commissioners of Education

Academic offices
Preceded by Robert M. Wilkes as interim President (2004–2005); David A. Bednar as President (1997–2004)	President of Brigham Young University–Idaho; August 19, 2005 – April 13, 2015	Succeeded by Clark Gilbert
