= Hyrum Manwaring =

American college president (1877–1956)

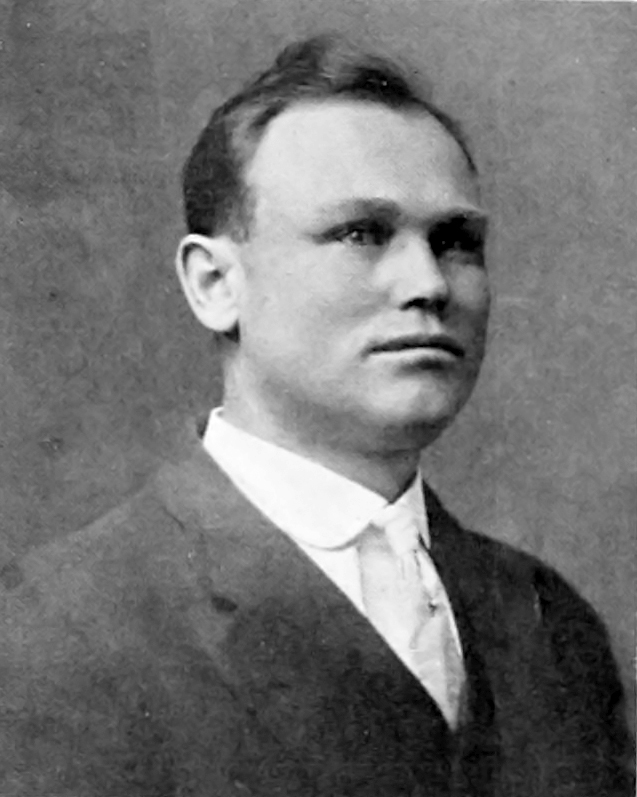
Hyrum Manwaring (1914)

Hyrum Manwaring (June 23, 1877 – September 8, 1956) was the president of Ricks College in Rexburg, Idaho, from 1930 to 1944. Ricks College was the precursor to today's Brigham Young University–Idaho, a private university operated by the Church of Jesus Christ of Latter-day Saints (LDS Church). Manwaring overcame delayed schooling – he was almost 29 when he graduated from high school – to become a dedicated champion of education. He led Ricks College through difficult times, when dissolution seemed inevitable, to a point where its future was assured. After retiring from the presidency in 1944, Manwaring continued to teach, and take classes himself, until near his death.

== Early life ==
Hyrum Wilkins Manwaring was born June 23, 1877, in Granger, Utah, an early town that is now part of West Valley City, Utah. His father, Herbert, came to the U.S. from Sandbach, England in 1869. His mother, Clarissa Wilkins, was the daughter of Charles Wilkins, also an emigrant from England. He was the oldest in a family of eight boys and had to begin working at an early age. That severely crippled his educational opportunities. Hyrum had to leave school after the sixth grade.

Around 1890, homesteads near Salt Lake City entered what Hyrum called "a land boom." So his father sold their place and they moved to the Springville-Mapleton area, south of Provo. A couple years later, Manwaring left home for good to become a section hand on the Denver and Rio Grande Western Railroad, which was then building branch lines to various Utah coal mines. Despite his youth – he was just fifteen years old – Hyrum held his own and was able to earn a man's wages.

However, living in a bunkhouse with "rough, profane men," Hyrum was subjected to many temptations. He later admitted that he had indulged in chewing and smoking tobacco, gotten drunk with "the boys," and sometimes exhibited a mean disposition. Yet he managed his money wisely and avoided associations with what were then called "loose women."

== Interest in education ==
In the spring of 1894, Hyrum (then 17), "accidentally dated" – his words – a local girl named Bessie Bird, taking her to a community dance. He does not explain his choice of terms in his memoir, other than stating that she was very young, under fifteen. A week later, they met again by "another mere accident."

These chance meetings changed the young man's life. Bessie had done very well in school, graduating from grade school with high honors. In the fall, she planned to start high school at the Brigham Young Academy (BYA). Although BYA then mostly taught high school level classes, it is considered a precursor to Brigham Young University (BYU). Her father, Charles Monroe Bird, was an influential man, both in the local LDS Church community and as a probate judge.

When Bessie went off to BYA, Manwaring discovered that he missed her terribly. He began to take more interest in LDS Church affairs and considered how he might gain more education. Over the next few years, he alternated between work on the railroad and going to school with Bessie. In the summer of 1898, just after turning twenty-one, he had gone back to the railroad to save for his sophomore year of high school.

Then he received an unexpected letter. The return address said "Box B, Salt Lake City, Utah." As every LDS Church member of that and several later generations knew, such a letter was Manwaring's call to go on a mission for the church. He was granted six months to work and save enough to pay his mission expenses. Manwaring left Utah in February 1899. After three weeks in Sydney, Australia, he spent his mission years in Tasmania, prior to returning to Utah in March 1903.

The returned missionary found it difficult to fit in with the rough men he had worked with on the railroad. But he endured and on September 16, 1903, Hyrum and Bessie Bird were married in the Salt Lake Temple. Their first child, H. Laurance, was born in April 1905, about the time when Hyrum completed his high school courses at BYA. He then began teaching classes himself in the preparatory school. The couple made ends meet financially with his teaching stipend, renting rooms to other students, and summer jobs for both of them. Over the next three years, Hyrum earned his teaching certificate, took on increased responsibilities (and salary) at the prep school, and progressed toward a college degree. He had shown a talent for dramatics, debating and public speaking, all of which opened up other opportunities.

Manwaring's plan to complete his degree was interrupted at the end of the 1907–1908 school year, when George H. Brimhall, BYU's president, stated he had been appointed principal of the Uintah Stake Academy in Vernal, Utah. The Manwarings went as well and spent two years in Vernal, with their second child, Lucille, born there. Manwaring then returned to BYU, which include his return to teaching prep classes while he continued his own education, receiving a bachelor's degree in 1911. He taught college English classes while he began graduate work. A second son, Eugune, was born during this period.

An event in late March, 1914, proved pivotal in Manwaring's life. The Ricks Academy Board of Education had decided to make sweeping changes in their faculty. They persuaded Andrew B. Christenson, who taught Biblical History and Literature at BYU, to become the Academcy's principal. Over three-quarters of the faculty members were dismissed, so the new principal found that he had nine teaching positions to fill.

== Teaching in Rexburg ==
Christenson persuaded Manwaring to accept a position to head the English Department at Ricks. Neither Hyrum nor Bessie had ever been to Rexburg and knew little about the academy. Perhaps not coincidentally, Manwaring was asked to deliver the "oration" at Ricks the following July. His initial impression of the town and the campus left him "stunned, bewildered, and seriously disappointed." However, he then said he caught a vision of a bright future for the institution, a dream strengthened when he met the "energetic and eager" student body.

Besides his departmental teaching and administrative duties, Manwaring served as a student counselor and oversaw the student activities program. The first summer after he arrived, Manwaring was tasked with writing a new catalog for the school. He also exercised his speaking skills for LDS Church audiences all over the region. Whenever possible, he turned these speaking engagements into recruiting visits. Christenson encouraged all of this, since he was determined to elevate Ricks to at least a junior college. That same summer, Gladys was born into the Manwaring family.

Christenson's wish was fulfilled when two years of college work were approved for the school, to start in the fall of 1916. However, part of the principal's agreement with the Board of Education had been that he would stay only two years. Although he agreed to stay for another academic year, he spent much of that time traveling. In his absence, Manwaring more or less served as acting principal. During the summer after that, Christenson left and George S. Romney became the new principal. Early in his tenure, the school was certified by the state for teacher education and was thereafter known as Ricks Normal College. (After this, Romney was known as the "president" of Ricks.) With those changes, Manwaring moved from the Academy English Department to become Dean of the Department of Psychology and Education.

Outside his school duties, Manwaring and one of his brothers invested in a farm operation, with land south of Rexburg. But the post-World War I recession hit rural areas particularly hard and they ended up deeply in debt. Even so, Manwaring took a leave of absence from the school in 1922 and went back to BYU to complete a master's degree. He returned to Ricks for a year of teaching and then moved to Berkeley, California, to work on a Ph.D. degree. Despite good academic progress, the family returned to Rexburg after just one year. Manwaring felt a strong need to show that he was actively paying off his debts.

During this same period, Ricks began to phase out its high school classes. As part of that change, in February 1923, the institution became simply Ricks College. Over the next several years, the institution continued to grow and gain new facilities. Manwaring served in several responsible positions in the LDS Church's Fremont Stake. Meanwhile, his oldest son went on a church mission to New Zealand. Manwaring still felt a need for more education. Thus, in the summer of 1929, he took a leave of absence from Ricks to attend George Washington University in Washington, D.C. He sold everything he owned in Idaho and moved his family across the country. His first year of studies proved very encouraging. So much so that Manwaring had decided he would not return to Rexburg. He would find some other way to pay off his debts.

The spring before this move, Ricks had initiated its first night classes, and Manwaring had been one of the four instructors assigned to that duty. Yet despite that sign of progress, rumors had also begun to suggest that the church might close the college. Church finances were known to be less than robust and schools elsewhere were indeed being closed. Officials rushed to deny those rumors, but many doubters remained.

== President of Ricks College ==
As the spring of 1930 approached, Manwaring received a letter from the chairman of the Ricks Board of Education. Romney had been granted a leave of absence and they wanted Manwaring to be the acting president. Manwaring received the impression that the assignment could lead to his becoming the president. Although he felt an obligation because he was on leave from Ricks, Manwaring agonized over the decision. His studies were going well, the family had settled in to enjoy their new home and (most importantly) he was not at all sure the college would even survive. However, he finally said "yes" anyway.

Despite the impression conveyed in the letter, a promotion was not guaranteed. Romney planned to study at the University of Chicago. When he addressed the Board at a special July meeting, Romney gave no indication of what his subsequent plans were. When the board chairman spoke, he said only that Manwaring had agreed to be acting president.

Manwaring was very well received in his new job, especially after he made some small changes that proved quite popular. Then, in the spring of 1931, he was named president of Ricks College. By then, the potential future of the school had taken a worrisome turn. Church finances remained somewhat precarious, so officials instructed the local Board to explore the possibility of giving (almost literally) the institution to the state of Idaho. Proponents introduced a bill to that effect. However, the idea was hotly opposed by supporters of the existing state schools, who did not want the education budget to be shared by another institution. The vote was close, but the bill failed.

Manwaring pushed hard to increase enrollment, improve class offerings, and nurture the spiritual life of the students. The school's enrollment did increase, but efforts to have the state take over continued. Another bill was introduced in the 1933 legislature but withdrawn when supporters saw they had no hope of winning. The 1935 bill died when it was sent to the Senate finance committee.

Despite the uncertain future, Manwaring pressed ahead with preparations to have the school formally accredited by the Northwest Association of Schools and Colleges. The association's representative made a visit in early 1936 and was greatly impressed. Full accreditation followed in the spring.

Still, the give-away campaign continued. The 1937 bill passed the House (by a smaller margin than in 1935), but failed in the Senate. Meanwhile, the school budget continued to decline. Although Manwaring felt like the church had "virtually closed the school," he travelled to Salt Lake City to make a personal appeal to save it. By then, church leaders had begun to heed the advice of David O. McKay, a member of the Quorum of the Twelve Apostles, who would later become church president, in educational matters. While Manwaring received no guarantees for the future, Ricks was granted a healthy budget for the coming year. McKay's support eventually assured that the school would remain in church hands.

Manwaring said that, after they felt more secure, "I went to New York and took a graduate course at Columbia University and had a very pleasant and profitable summer." The next few years were perhaps the best of Manwaring's tenure, with old structures being renovated and new ones added. In 1941, a year before his sixty-fifth birthday, he suggested to school authorities that they should all prepare for his retirement from the presidency on that birthday. They agreed but, of course, events intervened.

The entry of the U.S. into World War II after the Japanese attack on Pearl Harbor, severely impacted Ricks, as it did colleges and universities across the country. Male students worried about the draft and many prospective students volunteered anyway. The Board approved a policy that allowed qualified seventeen-year-olds to enroll for classes. They could earn one or two quarters of college credits before they became eligible for the draft. Manwaring stepped up his recruitment efforts, highlighting the fact that Ricks offered officer training programs for the Army and the Navy. The war also impacted the faculty, three of whom were called to active duty. None of them went to combat units, but someone had to fill those vacancies in the classrooms.

Naturally, students and faculty participated in all the "home front" activities: war bond promotion, scrap metal and rubber drives, "Victory Gardens," and more. But the men's athletic programs mostly reverted to intramural games because there were not enough males to fill out the teams. At school dances, girls danced with girls and "students who brought male relatives to dances were much appreciated."

Manwaring relinquished his role as president after the end of the 1944 school year.

== Post-presidency ==
The new president, John L. Clarke, arrived on campus in mid-August 1944. Meanwhile, Manwaring had visited LDS Church officials all over the region. One could see the war climaxing and expected it to end soon. A substantial surge in enrollment was expected, and the school would need even more support to meet the expanded demand.

Meanwhile, with his top-level administrative duties eased, Manwaring could focus more on teaching. He received "a very nice office" and took over as head of the Psychology Department. He also carried a full teaching load. At the end of the 1945 school year, Manwaring spoke during the graduation exercise. He would continue to speak at selected school events over the next several years.

In 1947, Manwaring and his wife spent the summer in California, taking classes at the Berkeley and Los Angeles campuses of the University of California. Two years later, they both attended summer sessions at the University of Colorado at Boulder.

In early 1950, Clarke spent a short leave of absence at the University of California to continue his doctoral studies. During his absence, Manwaring served the college as acting president. He taught full-time at Ricks until 1953. After that, he handled a part-time load until his death in 1956.

== Legacy ==
The Hyrum Manwaring Center on the campus of BYU–Idaho is named for him. It first went into operation as the Hyrum Manwaring Student Center in the fall of 1966. More recently, the structure was remodeled to include two new stores, an expanded food court, a dance studio suite and space for student activities.

Academic offices
| Preceded by George S. Romney | President of Ricks College; 1931—1944 | Succeeded by John L. Clarke |
