= Clark G. Gilbert =

American religious leader

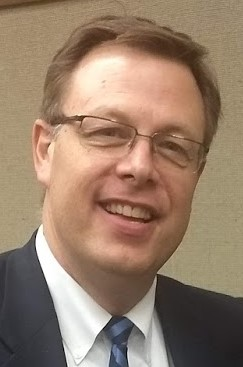
- Gilbert in 2019

Quorum of the Twelve Apostles
- February 11, 2026
- Called by: Dallin H. Oaks

LDS Church Apostle
- February 12, 2026
- Called by: Dallin H. Oaks
- Reason: Death of Jeffrey R. Holland

General Authority Seventy
- April 3, 2021 – February 12, 2026
- Called by: Russell M. Nelson
- End reason: Called to the Quorum of the Twelve Apostles

1st President of BYU–Pathway Worldwide

In office
- May 1, 2017 – August 1, 2021
- Successor: Brian K. Ashton

16th President of Brigham Young University–Idaho

In office
- April 13, 2015 – April 10, 2017
- Predecessor: Kim B. Clark
- Successor: Henry J. Eyring

Personal details
- Born: June 18, 1970 (age 56); Oakland, California
- Alma mater: Brigham Young University (BA); Stanford University (MA); Harvard University (DBA)
- Spouse(s): Christine Gilbert (m. 1994)
- Children: 8

Clark Gordon Gilbert (born June 18, 1970) is an American religious leader and academic who is a member of the Quorum of the Twelve Apostles of the Church of Jesus Christ of Latter-day Saints (LDS Church). He was ordained an apostle on February 12, 2026, filling a vacancy created by the death of Jeffrey R. Holland. He has been a church general authority since April 2021 and served as the church commissioner of education from August 2021 to April 2026. As a member of the Quorum of the Twelve, Gilbert is accepted by the church as a prophet, seer, and revelator. Currently, he is the junior and fifteenth most senior apostle in the church.

He served as the president of BYU–Pathway Worldwide (BYU–PW), an online higher education organization, from its creation in 2017 until August 2021. He was serving as the sixteenth president of Brigham Young University–Idaho (BYU–Idaho) when he was appointed inaugural president of BYU–PW.

Previously, Gilbert served as president and CEO of both the Deseret News and Deseret Digital Media, having also served as an executive vice president of Deseret Management Corporation (DMC), a professor at Harvard Business School (HBS), and as an associate academic vice president at BYU–Idaho.

== Early life and education ==
Gilbert was born on June 18, 1970, in Oakland, California, but grew up in Phoenix, Arizona. After high school, he studied international relations at Brigham Young University (BYU). From 1989 to 1991, he took a leave of absence to serve as a full-time missionary for the church in Kobe, Japan. He returned to BYU and earned a bachelor's degree in 1994. Gilbert earned a master's degree in Asian studies from Stanford University in 1995, then pursued doctoral studies in business administration at Harvard University, receiving a doctor of business administration degree in 2001. He then joined the HBS faculty.

== Career ==
Gilbert was a professor of entrepreneurial management at HBS. While there, he was an adviser to the American Press Institute's Newspaper Next project, which studied ways for newspapers to transition to the digital age. Gilbert also worked closely with Clayton M. Christensen while at HBS. Gilbert co-wrote "Dual Transformation: How to Reposition Today's Business While Creating the Future" (Harvard Business Review Press), which outlines a strategy for helping established organizations navigate disruption while developing new sources of growth at the same time—an approach later reflected in his leadership at the Deseret News and within the Church Educational System.

After leaving HBS, Gilbert joined the faculty of BYU–Idaho and served as associate academic vice president of academic development; his responsibilities included student leadership, the BYU–Idaho Learning Model, online learning, and the Pathway program.

=== Deseret Digital Media and Deseret News ===
In 2009, Gilbert became the CEO of the newly formed Deseret Digital Media, a subsidiary corporation of DMC. This corporation administers the websites of the Deseret News, Church News, Mormon Times, KSL radio, and Deseret Book.

In May 2010, Gilbert was appointed president of the Deseret News. He did not replace Jim Wall (the publisher) or Joseph A. Cannon (the editor), but filled a new role in the organization.

In August 2010, with Gilbert at the helm, the Deseret News laid off forty-three percent of its workforce.

Gilbert identified six themes to guide the paper's coverage going forward: family, financial responsibility, excellence in education, care for the needy, values in media, and faith in the community.

Under Gilbert, the Deseret News reported a 2011 boost in all aspects of its circulation, but Salt Lake City Weekly refuted its print numbers. A year later, Gilbert spoke at the International News Media Association (INMA) conference, crediting a doubling of the paper's Sunday print edition to nationwide readers' interest in the six themes.

As part of Gilbert's plan to "lead and innovate," the Deseret News and KSL created Deseret Connect, a network of freelance contributors under Matt Sanders's direction. Much of Deseret Connect's content has been featured prominently on the Deseret News homepage, though the print paper has largely remained the work of full- and part-time staff.

In November 2011, it was revealed that the mayor of Utah's West Valley City, Michael K. Winder, wrote under a pen name as a Deseret Connect contributor about city hall events to get more good news about West Valley City, and his stories were featured in the Deseret News. Gilbert said he was highly concerned, and that Deseret News deeply regretted that the mayor would misrepresent himself in such a way.

=== BYU–Idaho ===
On April 13, 2015, Gilbert succeeded Kim B. Clark as president of BYU–Idaho, becoming the institution's sixteenth president. His appointment had been announced on January 27, 2015, by Russell M. Nelson, then-chairman of the Executive Committee of the BYU–Idaho Board of Trustees. Gilbert was formally installed during an inauguration ceremony on September 15, 2015.

=== BYU–PW ===
On February 7, 2017, Dieter F. Uchtdorf announced the creation of BYU–PW, a new online higher education organization. Gilbert was appointed to head this new organization, which grew out of BYU–Idaho's Pathway program, originally begun in 2009. He was replaced as president of BYU–Idaho by Henry J. Eyring, with his new position as president of BYU–PW effective on May 1, 2017.

== LDS Church service ==
Gilbert has served previously in the LDS Church as a bishop, member of a stake presidency, and from April 2020 to April 2021 as an area seventy. In April 2021, Gilbert was called as a general authority.

=== Church commissioner of education ===
In August 2021, Gilbert became the commissioner of the Church Educational System (CES).

As the commissioner, Gilbert sought to ensure that church schools—in particular BYU—resist what he perceived as pressures from the wider American academy to conform to a secular ideal of a university. He frequently cited James Tunstead Burtchaell's The Dying of the Light: The Disengagement of Colleges and Universities from Their Christian Churches as inspiration for his efforts, telling the Deseret News in an interview after being called as an apostle that the book had been on his desk the entire time he was commissioner.

During his first year in the role, Gilbert conducted an informal study of the BYU faculty and grouped them into four categories: "The Faithful Core," "The Supportive Center, "The 'Secular First,' " and "Open Foes." Sharing this analysis at a private gathering of prominent Latter-day Saints in Salt Lake City, Gilbert reportedly said he would push those with dissenting views out of the university, stating (according to several attendees) that the First Presidency would "not stand for a contrary opinion by professors at BYU,” and that he would seek to “get them out.”

In 2022, all CES faculty and staff, including at BYU, were asked to affirm their support of the church’s teachings on marriage, family, and gender as part of a new employment contract. Several BYU professors subsequently departed the school in the wake of what they believed were Gilbert's efforts to punish unorthodox voices, while others criticized the perceived crackdown on dissent.

== Personal life ==
Gilbert and his wife, Christine, were married in 1994 in the Salt Lake Temple. They have eight children.

The Church of Jesus Christ of Latter-day Saints titles
Preceded by Gérald Caussé	Quorum of the Twelve Apostles; February 11, 2026 – present	Succeeded by Incumbent
Academic offices
Preceded by Kim B. Clark	President of Brigham Young University–Idaho; April 13, 2015 – April 10, 2017	Succeeded by Henry J. Eyring
Preceded by Inaugural	President of BYU-Pathway Worldwide; May 1, 2017 – August 1, 2021	Succeeded by Brian K. Ashton
