= Banida, Idaho =

Unincorporated community in the state of Idaho, United States

Coordinates: 42°13′52″N 111°56′33″W

Banida is an unincorporated community in Franklin County, in the U.S. state of Idaho.

== History ==
A post office called Banida was established in 1912, and remained in operation until 1959. The community's name is a blend of the names of Bannock County and Oneida County. A variant name was "Dunnville".

Banida's population was 100 in 1960.

== Notable person ==
Joe J. Christensen, a general authority in the Church of Jesus Christ of Latter-day Saints, was born at Banida in 1929.
