= John L. Clarke =

John L. Clarke (May 14, 1905 – February 20, 1991) served as president of Ricks College from 1944 until 1971.

When Clarke became president of Ricks in 1944 there were 200 students and two buildings on the campus. During the late 1940s and early 1950s the college was a four-year institution. However, in the early 1950s it moved back to a two-year curriculum. Clarke also oversaw the period where leaders of the Church Educational System attempted to move Ricks from Rexburg, Idaho to Idaho Falls. This plan was vigorously opposed by the residents of Rexburg and was eventually abandoned.

When Clarke was replaced by Henry B. Eyring in 1971, the school had 5,300 students and 24 buildings.

Academic offices
Preceded by Hyrum Manwaring	President of Ricks College; 1944—1971	Succeeded by Henry B. Eyring
