= Alvin F. Meredith III =

Current president of BYU-Idaho

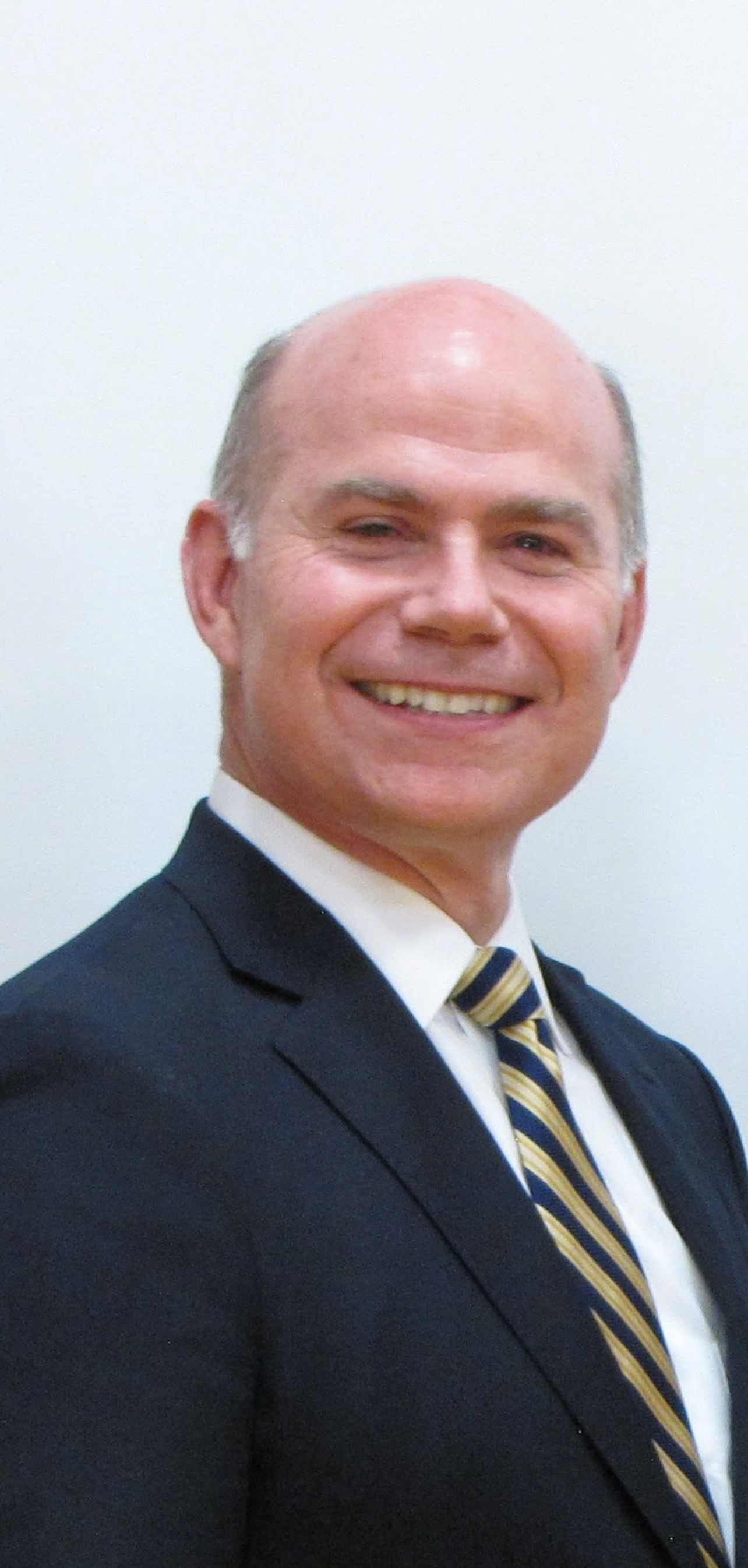

General Authority Seventy
- April 3, 2021
- Called by: Russell M. Nelson

18th President of Brigham Young University–Idaho

In office
- August 1, 2023
- Predecessor: Henry J. Eyring

Personal details
- Born: July 22, 1970 (age 55); Chattanooga, Tennessee, U.S.
- Alma mater: Brigham Young University (B.S.); University of Chicago Booth School of Business (M.B.A.)
- Spouse(s): Jennifer (Edgin) Meredith
- Children: 6
- Website: "Office of the President".

Alvin Frazier Meredith III (born July 22, 1970) is the 18th president of Brigham Young University–Idaho. He was announced as the university's next president in May 2023, began service on August 1, 2023, and was inaugurated on October 10, 2023. He has been a general authority seventy of the Church of Jesus Christ of Latter-day Saints (LDS Church) since April 2021. He and his wife, Jennifer, served as mission leaders of the church's Utah Salt Lake City South Mission prior to his call as a general authority.

== Personal life ==
Alvin Frazier Meredith III was born in Chattanooga, Tennessee, on July 22, 1970, to Alvin Frazier Meredith Jr. and Mary Smartt Meredith.

After serving full-time as an LDS Church missionary in the Utah Salt Lake City Mission, he graduated with a bachelor's degree in psychology from Brigham Young University in Provo, Utah, in 1991 and a master's of business administration in 2001 from the University of Chicago.

He married Jennifer Denise Edgin on June 6, 1998, in the Salt Lake Temple. They are the parents of six children.

== Career ==
During his career, Meredith worked as a Six Sigma Black Belt for GE Capital, a consultant for Boston Consulting Group, and a senior vice president for Asurion.

== LDS Church service ==
Meredith served as an area seventy in both the sixth (North America Southeast Area) and eighth (Asia Area) quorums of the seventy.

Meredith and his wife served as leaders of the Utah Salt Lake City South Mission until April 2021.

Meredith was called as an LDS Church general authority on April 3, 2021.

=== BYU–Idaho president ===
On August 1, 2023, Meredith succeeded Henry J. Eyring as president of BYU–Idaho, becoming the institution's eighteenth president. His appointment was announced on May 18, 2023 by D. Todd Christofferson, chair of the Executive Committee of the BYU–Idaho Board of Trustees. Meredith III was formally installed during an inauguration ceremony on October 10, 2023.

Academic offices
Preceded by Henry J. Eyring	President of Brigham Young University–Idaho; August 1, 2023 – Present	Incumbent
