= Carliss Y. Baldwin =

American economist

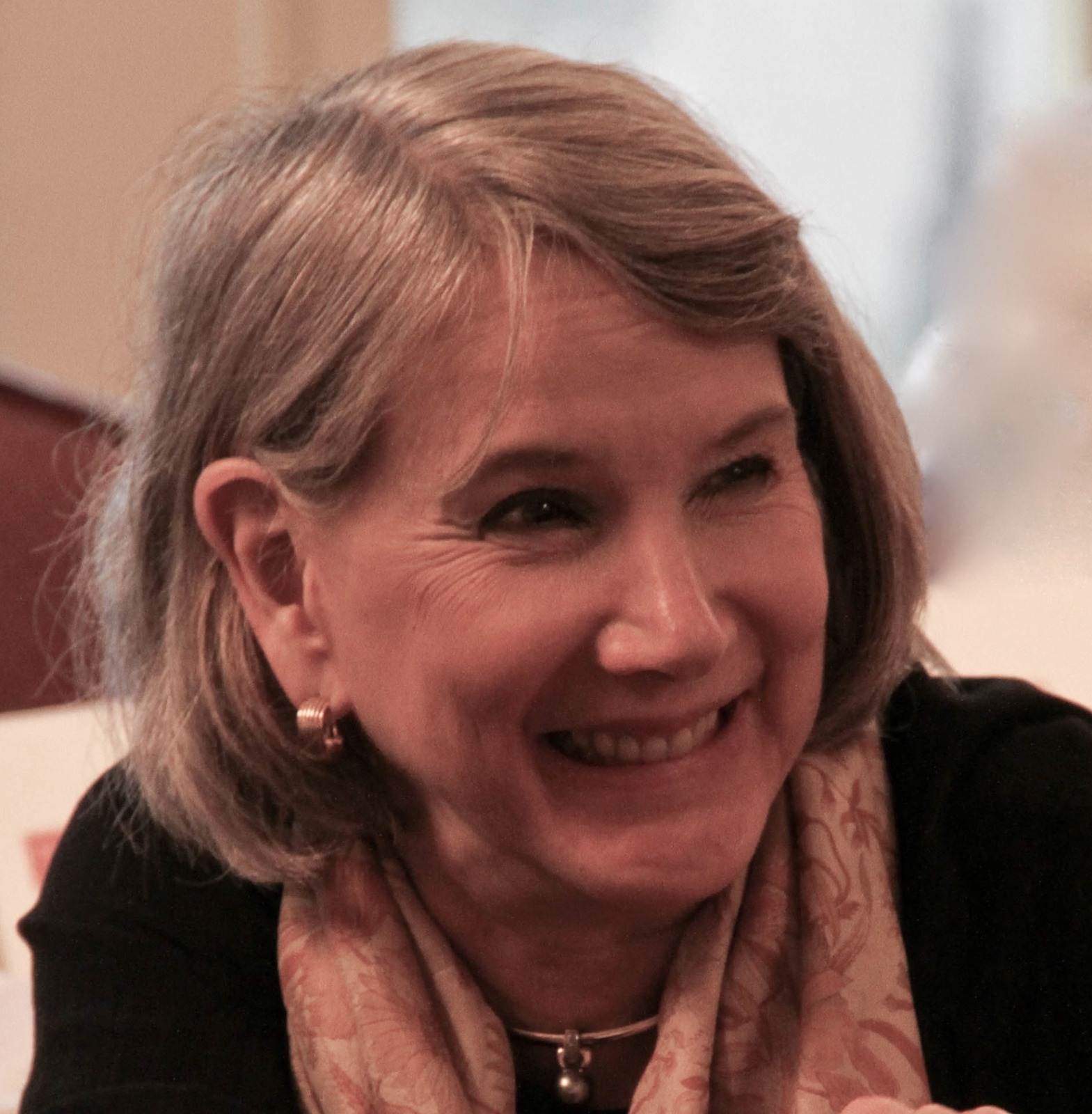
- Education: Massachusetts Institute of Technology (BS); Harvard Business School (MBA, DBA)
- Known for: Research on modularity and innovation
- Notable work: Design Rules, Volume 1: The Power of Modularity (2000); Design Rules, Volume 2: How Technology Shapes Organizations (2024)
- Title: William L. White Professor of Business Administration
- Awards: Distinguished Scholar Award (Academy of Management, 2015)
- Scientific career
- Fields: Economics, innovation management
- Workplaces: Harvard Business School

Dr. Carliss Y. Baldwin is an American economist and the William L. White Professor of Business Administration, Emerita at Harvard Business School. She is a management scholar, and she studies technology and innovation. Her book on modularity in complex technological systems, Design Rules: The power of Modularity, published in 2000 and co-written with Kim B. Clark, has been called "a landmark book" that has impacted research on organization theory, competitive strategy, and innovation.

== Early life and education ==
Dr. Baldwin was born in 1950. She received a Bachelor of Science degree in economics from Massachusetts Institute of Technology 1972, then moved to Harvard Business School where she received an MBA, graduating as a Baker Scholar. She became a Doctor of Business Administration (DBA) IN 1977. Her doctoral thesis was entitled "Illiquid assets and liquidity preference in an Uncertain Environment". She studied financial economics under the supervision of Robert C. Merton, Franco Modigliani and John Lintner and business history under Alfred D. Chandler,Jr.

== Career ==
She became an assistant professor of finance at MIT in 1977 and was a faculty fellow at the Bunting Institute of Radcliffe College from 1980-1982. She moved to Harvard Business School as an associate professor in 1981. She was promoted to tenure in finance at HBS in 1987 and was named William L, White Professor of Business Administration in 1988.She was the fourth woman to receive tenure at Harvard Business School.

While on the faculty, Baldwin served as Special Field Coordinator for Harvard University’s PhD in Business Economics/Finance from 1986 –1992. In that role, she helped to redesign the doctoral programs to allow Harvard Business School to grant the Ph.D degree. She served as a Director of Research at Harvard Business School from 1989 to 1991 and was a Senior Associate Dean and member of the Dean’s Operating Group.

Baldwin served on the U.S. Securities and Exchange Commission's Emerging Markets Advisory Committee from 1990 to 1993 and on the President's Economic Policy Advisory Board in 1994. She was also a director of the Federal Home Loan Bank of Boston and served on the boards of several public, corporate, and nonprofit organizations. In addition to her academic appointments, she served on advisory and policy committees at Harvard University. From 2016 to 2024, she was a member of the Board of Directors of the Organizational Design Community, and from 2020 to 2024 she served as a guest editor of a special issue of Research Policy on Innovation and Ecosystem Innovation.She retired from HBS in 2018. Carliss Baldwin is the Co-founder and Advisor for Silverthread, Inc

== Honors and awards ==
Baldwin and Kim B. Clark won the Newcomen-Harvard Award for Best Paper Published in the Business History Review in 1994 for "Capital Budgeting Systems and Capabilities Investments in U.S. Companies after World War II". With Christoph Hienerth and Eric von Hippel, she won the 2007 University of Vienna Best Paper Award for "How User Innovations Become Commercial Products: A Theoretical Investigation and a Case Study".

She received the 2008 Distinguished Speaker Award from the Technology Management Section of INFORMS. Her 2008 paper “Where do Transactions Come From? Modularity, Transactions, and the Boundaries of Firms,” in the journal Industrial and Corporate Change was selected as one of the Best Twenty Articles from First Twenty Years of Publication (1992–2011).

In 2014, Baldwin was awarded an honorary doctorate by the Technical University of Munich (TUM) School of Management.

In 2015 Baldwin was recognized as the Distinguished Scholar of the Technology and Innovation Management (TIM) division of the Academy of Management.With Bo Becker and Vincent Dessain, Baldwin won the 2015 Case Centre Award in the Finance, Accounting and Control category for “Roche’s Acquisition of Genentech” (HBS Case 210–040).

In 2016, Baldwin and Eric von Hippel's paper “Modeling a Paradigm Shift: From Producer Innovation to User and Open Collaborative Innovation”, published in Organization Science, received the TIMES Best Paper Award for innovation and entrepreneurship research published in an INFORMS journal.

In 2021, Baldwin was named a Foundation Scholar by the Knowledge and Innovation Interest Group of the Strategic Management Society.

== Research ==
Baldwin's early research dealt with corporate finance and capital investment, including work with Kim B. Clark on the capital budgeting systems adopted by large American companies after the Second World War. During the 1990s her attention shifted to the design of complex technological systems. In Design Rules, Volume 1: The Power of Modularity (2000), she and Clark argued that modularity, the division of a complex system into components that can be designed independently while remaining interoperable, explains much of the innovation and changing structure of the computer industry.

Her later work examined the relationship between technical architecture and organizational structure. In a 2016 article with Lyra Colfer, Baldwin reviewed 142 empirical studies of the "mirroring hypothesis" and concluded that mirroring was a common, though not universal, pattern.With Eric VonHippel, she also examined the shift from producer-led innovation to user and open collaborative innovation.

In 2023, Industrial and Corporate Change published a special issue marking the twentieth anniversary of Design Rules and examining its impact on research in innovation and organization design.

In 2024, MIT Press published Design Rules, Volume 2: How Technology Shapes Organizations as an open-access monograph. The book examines how different technological architectures influence the structure and strategy of organizations.

== Key works ==
- Baldwin, C. Y.; Clark, K. B. (1997) “Managing in an Age of Modularity,” (with Kim B. Clark) Harvard Business Review, (September-October 1997).
- Baldwin, C. Y.; Clark, K. B. (2000). Design Rules, Volume 1: The Power of Modularity. MIT Press. doi:10.7551/mitpress/2366.001.0001. ISBN 978-0-262-26764-9.
- Baldwin (2008). "Where do transactions come from? Modularity, transactions, and the boundaries of firms". Industrial and Corporate Change. 17 (1): 155–95. doi:10.1093/icc/dtm036.
- Baldwin, C. Y.; Woodard, C. J. (2009). The architecture of platforms: A uniﬁed view. in Platforms, Markets and Innovation, Annabelle Gawer, ed. Edward Elgar, 2009.
- Baldwin, C. Y.; Von Hippel, E. (2011). Modeling a paradigm shift: From producer innovation to user and open collaborative innovation. Vol. 22. pp. 1399–1417.
- Baldwin, C. Y. (2024). Design Rules, Volume 2: How Technology Shapes Organizations. MIT Press. doi:10.7551/mitpress/7374.001.0001. ISBN 978-0-262-38023-2.
