= Andrew B. Christenson =

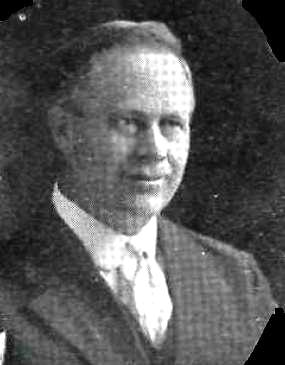
- Christenson c. 1917

6th Principal of Ricks Academy
- In office 1914–1917
- Preceded by: Ezra C. Dalby
- Succeeded by: George S. Romney

Personal details
- Born: 1869; Manti, Utah, U.S.
- Died: 1931 (aged 61–62)
- Spouse: Sarah Jane Bartholomew (m. 1896)
- Education: Brigham Young Academy; University of Michigan (BA)
- Profession: Educator

Andrew B. Christenson (1869–1931) was the president of Ricks Academy from 1914 to 1917.

Christenson was born in Manti, Utah. He graduated from Brigham Young Academy. In 1896 he married Sarah Jane Bartholomew (1875–1966) in the Manti Temple. Christenson was then a teacher and principal in Kanab, Utah. He later studied at the University of Michigan where he received a BA in Literature in 1901.

Christenson served as principal of LDS High School, the predecessor of LDS Business College, and was on the faculty of Brigham Young University before coming to Ricks College. During his term as president of Ricks the school first offered college level courses.

Christenson was a member of the Church of Jesus Christ of Latter-day Saints.

== Sources ==
- BYU-Idaho bio of Christenson

Academic offices
Preceded by Ezra C. Dalby	Principal of Ricks Academy; 1914 – 1917	Succeeded by George S. Romney
