= Henry B. Eyring =

American religious leader (born 1933)

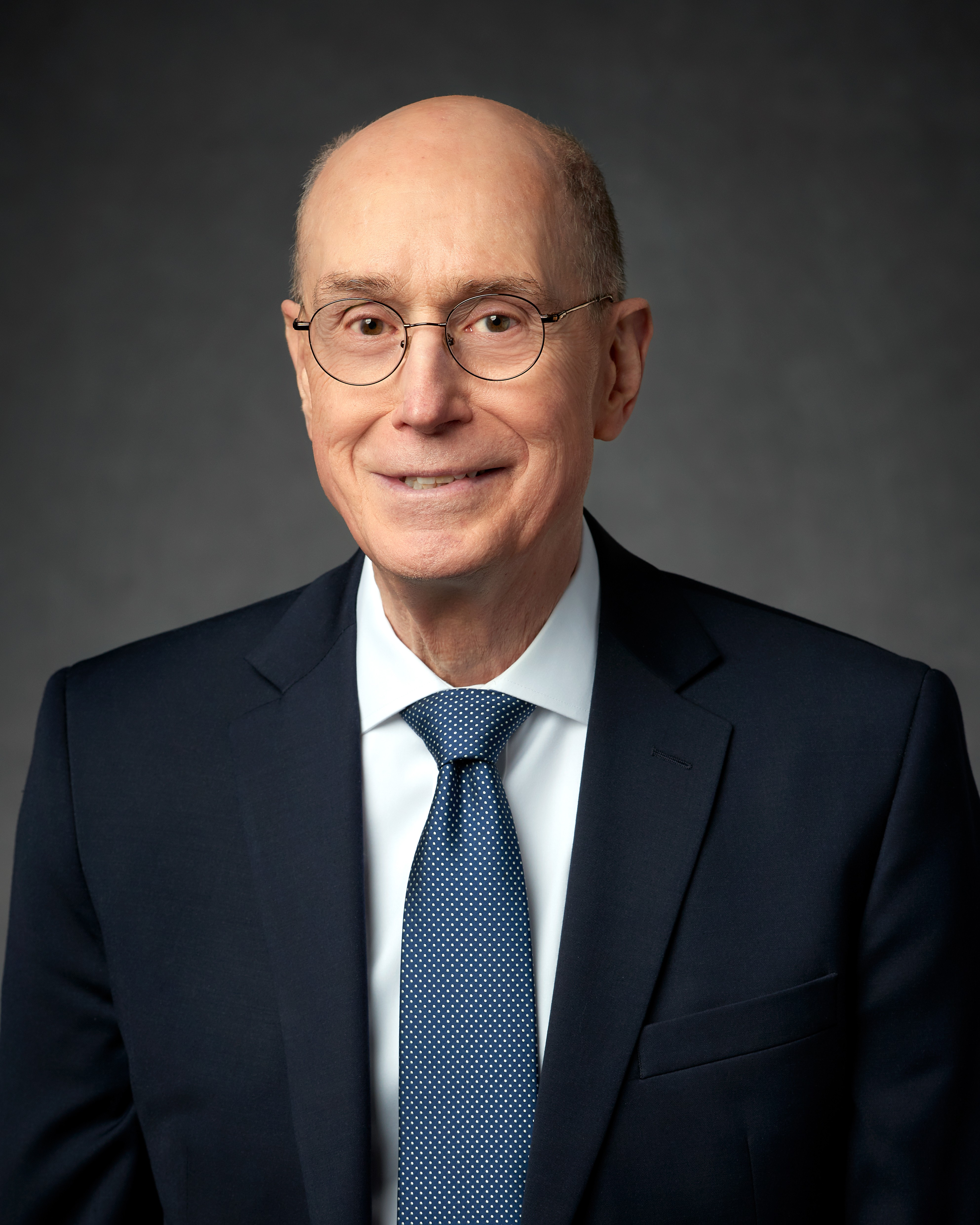
- Eyring in 2024

First Counselor in the First Presidency
- October 14, 2025
- Called by: Dallin H. Oaks
- Predecessor: Dallin H. Oaks

President of the Quorum of the Twelve Apostles (Note: with Dieter F. Uchtdorf as Acting President)
- December 27, 2025 (Note: Served as the de facto Quorum President from December 27, 2025, until he was officially set apart as quorum president, date not specified.)
- Called by: Dallin H. Oaks
- Predecessor: Jeffrey R. Holland

Second Counselor in the First Presidency
- January 14, 2018 – September 27, 2025
- Called by: Russell M. Nelson
- Predecessor: Dieter F. Uchtdorf
- Successor: D. Todd Christofferson
- End reason: Dissolution of First Presidency on death of Russell M. Nelson

First Counselor in the First Presidency
- February 3, 2008 – January 2, 2018
- Called by: Thomas S. Monson
- Predecessor: Thomas S. Monson
- Successor: Dallin H. Oaks
- End reason: Dissolution of First Presidency on death of Thomas S. Monson

Second Counselor in the First Presidency
- October 6, 2007 – January 27, 2008
- Called by: Gordon B. Hinckley
- Predecessor: James E. Faust
- Successor: Dieter F. Uchtdorf
- End reason: Dissolution of First Presidency on death of Gordon B. Hinckley

Quorum of the Twelve Apostles
- April 1, 1995 – October 6, 2007
- Called by: Gordon B. Hinckley
- End reason: Called as Second Counselor in the First Presidency

LDS Church Apostle
- April 6, 1995
- Called by: Gordon B. Hinckley
- Reason: Death of Howard W. Hunter; reorganization of the First Presidency

First Quorum of the Seventy
- October 3, 1992 – April 1, 1995
- Called by: Ezra Taft Benson
- End reason: Called to the Quorum of the Twelve Apostles

First Counselor in the Presiding Bishopric
- April 1, 1985 – October 3, 1992
- Called by: Robert D. Hales
- Predecessor: H. Burke Peterson
- Successor: H. David Burton
- End reason: Called to the First Quorum of the Seventy

Military career
- 1955–1957
- Service/branch: United States Air Force
- Rank: First Lieutenant

Personal details
- Born: Henry Bennion Eyring; May 31, 1933 (age 93); Princeton, New Jersey, U.S.
- Education: University of Utah (BS); Harvard University (MBA, DBA)
- Spouse(s): Kathleen Johnson (m. 1962; died 2023)
- Children: 6 (including Henry J. Eyring)
- Parents: Henry Eyring; Mildred Bennion
- Signature
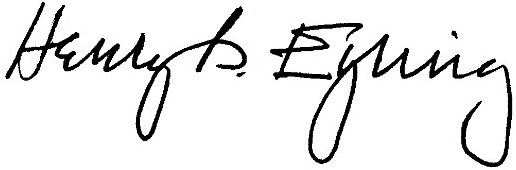

Henry Bennion Eyring (born May 31, 1933) is an American religious leader and former educational administrator serving as the first counselor in the First Presidency of the Church of Jesus Christ of Latter-day Saints (LDS Church). As the church's second most senior apostle, he is also the President of the Quorum of the Twelve Apostles, with Dieter F. Uchtdorf serving as the quorum's acting president.

Born in Princeton, New Jersey, Eyring earned a bachelor's degree in physics from the University of Utah in 1955 and later received MBA and DBA degrees from Harvard University. He served two years in the U.S. Air Force before beginning a career in academia. He was a professor of business at Stanford University from 1962 to 1971, also serving as a Sloan Visiting Fellow at Massachusetts Institute of Technology (MIT). He was the president of Ricks College (now Brigham Young University–Idaho) from 1971 to 1977.

Eyring has been an LDS Church general authority since 1985. He was a counselor in the Presiding Bishopric from 1985 to 1992, then became a member of the First Quorum of the Seventy until he was called to the Quorum of the Twelve Apostles in 1995. He served twice as commissioner of the Church Educational System, first from 1980 to 1985 and again from 1992 to 2005.

== Early life ==
Eyring was born on May 31, 1933, in Princeton, New Jersey, the second child of Henry Eyring, then a professor at Princeton and later the dean of the graduate school at the University of Utah and president of the American Chemical Society, and his wife, Mildred Bennion. Eyring's aunt, Camilla Eyring, was the wife of Spencer W. Kimball, the twelfth president of the LDS Church.

He lived in Princeton until his early teenage years. Until the start of World War II, they attended LDS meetings at the branch in New Brunswick, New Jersey, but with the gasoline rationing of the war, they received permission to hold meetings in their home, which often had only the Eyring family. As a teenager, Eyring and his family moved to Salt Lake City, where his father took a post at the University of Utah.

== Military service and education ==
Eyring spent two years in the U.S. Air Force, stationed at Sandia Base in New Mexico. In New Mexico, Eyring served as a district missionary for the LDS Church. Eyring had been in the ROTC at the University of Utah. While in the Air Force, he served as a liaison between military officers and scientists. His main responsibility was to analyze data from weapons tests of nuclear weapons. At the end of the assignment, he gave a report and ended up meeting in person with a collection of several leading generals.

Eyring had previously received a bachelor's degree in physics from the University of Utah in 1955. He went on to earn both MBA and DBA degrees in business administration from the Harvard Business School before embarking on a career in academia. Over the summer after his first year at Harvard, Eyring did an internship with Arthur D. Little as a consultant for Abitibi Power and Paper Company. He did an analysis to study how to improve the process of river logging. His suggestion was to abandon river logging and turn to truck transport of logs, but a combination of not studying the issue deeply enough and having a CEO of the company who had risen through the ranks from being a river logger prevented Eyring's suggestions from being adopted then.

While studying at Harvard, Eyring was heavily influenced by Georges Doriot, who offered Eyring a chance to work with him and Ken Olsen, the founder of Digital Equipment Company. Eyring chose instead to pursue a doctorate in business.

== Academic and business career ==
In the fall of 1962, Eyring began work as a professor at Stanford University. He finished his doctorate in business in the summer of 1963. That summer, Eyring completed a fellowship with the RAND Corporation. Eyring had married his wife, Kathleen, the summer before he started at Stanford, and they spent their first year of married life moving through various homes his real estate developer father-in-law was in the process of refurbishing. They then spent the next ten years living in the guest house of his in-laws' property.

Among Eyring's associates at Stanford were Roger Sant and Ed Zschau. Eyring worked with Zschau in the founding of the computer company System Industries.

Eyring was an associate professor of business at the Stanford Graduate School of Business from 1962 to 1971. He was also a Sloan Visiting Faculty Fellow at the Massachusetts Institute of Technology. At MIT, he took multiple courses in human behavior, including courses from Douglas McGregor, who died of a heart attack while Eyring was at MIT, and also Ed Schein and Warren Bennis.

Eyring has served twice as commissioner of church education, from September 1980 to April 1985, and from September 1992 to January 2005, when he was replaced by W. Rolfe Kerr.

== LDS Church service ==
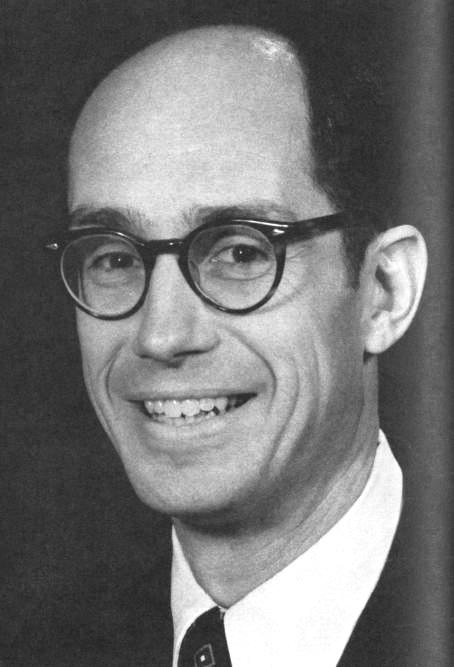
Eyring while president of Ricks College

Among other callings in the LDS Church, Eyring has served as a regional representative, bishop and member of the Sunday School General Board. Eyring served as an early-morning seminary teacher early in his time as a professor at Stanford University, and as bishop of the Stanford singles ward later on.

Eyring served as president of Ricks College from 1971 to 1977, as a counselor to Presiding Bishop Robert D. Hales from 1985 to 1992, and as a member of the First Quorum of the Seventy, from 1992 to 1995.

Following the death of church president Howard W. Hunter, Eyring was sustained as a member of the church's Quorum of the Twelve Apostles on April 1, 1995 and ordained an apostle later that week.

Eyring was sustained as second counselor in the church's First Presidency on October 6, 2007, filling the vacancy left by the August 10, 2007, death of James E. Faust. When the First Presidency was reorganized following the death of Gordon B. Hinckley, Eyring was called as the first counselor on February 3, 2008. The new First Presidency, with Monson as president, was announced on February 4, 2008.

Following Monson's death, Eyring was announced on January 16, 2018, as second counselor to Nelson, with Dallin H. Oaks as first counselor. After Nelson's death, Eyring was set apart as first counselor to Oaks in the First Presidency on October 14, 2025, with D. Todd Christofferson serving as second counselor.

Following the death of Jeffrey R. Holland on December 27, 2025, Eyring became the most senior apostle behind church president Oaks and became president of the Quorum of the Twelve Apostles, with Dieter F. Uchtdorf being set apart as the quorum's acting president on January 8, 2026.

As a member of the First Presidency, Eyring has dedicated the San Salvador El Salvador, Gilbert Arizona, Payson Utah, Indianapolis Indiana, and Philadelphia Pennsylvania Temples where he had also presided at the groundbreaking in 2011 as well as rededicating the Buenos Aires Argentina and Mexico City Mexico Temples.

In 2014, after a meeting with Pope Francis, Eyring spoke at Humanum, "an International Interreligious Colloquium on The Complementarity of Man and Woman," held in Vatican City. It was the first time that a pope and a top LDS general authority ever met.

== Personal life ==
Eyring and his wife, Kathleen Johnson, met at a YSA meeting held at Rindge, New Hampshire at the Cathedral of the Pines in the spring of 1960. They became further acquainted at a meeting at the LDS Longfellow Park Chapel in Cambridge, Massachusetts, the next summer. Johnson was a native of Palo Alto and was a student at Stanford University. She had previously studied summers at the University of Vienna and University of Paris and was studying at Harvard University the summer she met Eyring. Wilbur Cox, the LDS Church's district president (to whom Eyring was serving as a counselor), made accommodations to facilitate Eyring's dating Johnson. After an intense courtship that first summer, Eyring and Johnson continued courting with her making multiple cross-country airplane trips until they were engaged early in 1961. They were married in the LDS Church's Logan Temple on July 27, 1962, with the ceremony performed by his uncle, Spencer W. Kimball. The couple were married for 61 years until Kathleen's death on October 15, 2023, at the age of 82.

They are the parents of six children (four sons and two daughters). Their sons include Henry J. Eyring, past president of BYU–Idaho (2017 to 2023); and Matthew J. Eyring, the chief strategy innovation officer of Vivint, a home automation company in North America. Eyring is a first cousin once-removed of former Michigan governor George W. Romney; his paternal grandmother was Romney's aunt. As of 2023, Eyring had 34 grandchildren and 31 great-grandchildren.

== Honors ==
- Honorary Doctor of Humane Letters, University of Utah (2015)
- Honorary Doctor of Humane Letters, Utah Valley University (2017)

== Published works ==
- Eyring, Henry B. (2016). On The Path Home. Deseret Book Company. ISBN 978-1629722535.
- —— (2013). Choose Higher Ground. Deseret Book Company. ISBN 9781609074630.
- —— (2006). Because He First Loved Us: A Collection of Discourses. Deseret Book Company. ISBN 1-59038-637-X.
- —— (2004). To Draw Closer to God: A Collection of Discourses. Deseret Book. ISBN 1-59038-322-2.
- —— (2003). Go Forth to Serve. Deseret Book. ISBN 1-57008-946-9.
- —— (2002). Because He First Loved Us. Deseret Book. ISBN 1-57008-924-8.
- —— (1995). On Becoming a Disciple-Scholar: Lectures presented at the Brigham Young University Honors Program. Discipline and discipleship lecture series. Bookcraft. ISBN 1-57008-198-0.
- —— (August 1968), "Wise Advice for R and D.", PsycCRITIQUES, 13 (8), Stanford University, Stanford, CA: 398–400, doi:10.1037/009462, ISSN 1554-0138. Database:PsycINFO Electronic, accessed March 12, 2009
- —— (December 1966). "Some Sources of Uncertainty and Their Consequences in Engineering Design Projects". IEEE Transactions on Engineering Management. EM-13 (4): 167–80. doi:10.1109/tem.1966.6447108.
- —— (1963). Evaluation of planning models for research and development projects (DBA thesis). [Boston] Graduate School of Business Administration, G.F. Baker Foundation, Harvard University. OCLC 12284394.

Speeches

- —— (2014), A Leader of Learners, BYU Speeches
- —— (2008), The Power of Deliverance, BYU Speeches
- —— (2006), Gifts of the Spirit for Hard Times, BYU Speeches
- —— (2002), ″Go Forth to Serve″, BYU Speeches
- —— (2001), A Consecrated Place, BYU Speeches
- —— (2000), A Life Founded in Light and Truth, BYU Speeches
- —— (1999), Always, BYU Speeches
- —— (1997), A Child of God, BYU Speeches
- —— (1996), Making Covenants with God, BYU Speeches
- —— (1996), A Charted Course, BYU Speeches
- —— (1996), Faith of Our Fathers, BYU Speeches
- —— (1995), The Family, BYU Speeches
- —— (1994), Blessed are the Peacemakers, BYU Speeches
- —— (1993), To Choose and Keep a Mentor, BYU Speeches
- —— (1991), Choose to Be Good, BYU Speeches
- —— (1991), Teaching Is a Moral Act, BYU Speeches
- —— (1990), Waiting Upon the Lord, BYU Speeches
- —— (1989), Come Unto Christ, BYU Speeches
- —— (1988), Listen Together, BYU Speeches
- —— (1986), Going Home, BYU Speeches
- —— (1986), Child of Promise, BYU Speeches
- —— (1985), Good Judgment and Common Sense, BYU Speeches
- —— (1983), Discovering Truth, BYU Speeches
- —— (1982), A Law of Increasing Returns, BYU Speeches
- —— (1980), Gifts of Love, BYU Speeches

== See also ==
- Council on the Disposition of the Tithes – Leadership body in the LDS Church
- Glenn L. Pace – Counselor with Eyring in the presiding bishopric

== Notes ==
The Church of Jesus Christ of Latter-day Saints titles
| Preceded by Dallin H. Oaks | First Counselor in the First Presidency; October 14, 2025 – present | Succeeded by Incumbent |
| Preceded by Jeffrey R. Holland | President of the Quorum of the Twelve Apostles; December 27, 2025 – present | Succeeded by Incumbent |
| Preceded by Thomas S. Monson | First Counselor in the First Presidency; February 3, 2008 – January 2, 2018 | Succeeded by Dallin H. Oaks |
| Preceded by Dieter F. Uchtdorf | Second Counselor in the First Presidency; January 14, 2018 – September 27, 2025 | Succeeded by D. Todd Christofferson |
| Preceded by James E. Faust | Second Counselor in the First Presidency; October 6, 2007 – January 27, 2008 | Succeeded by Dieter F. Uchtdorf |
| Preceded by Jeffrey R. Holland | Quorum of the Twelve Apostles; April 1, 1995 – October 6, 2007 | Succeeded by Dieter F. Uchtdorf |
| Preceded by H. Burke Peterson | First Counselor in the Presiding Bishopric; April 6, 1985 – October 3, 1992 | Succeeded by H. David Burton |
Academic offices
| Preceded by John L. Clarke | President of Ricks College; 1971 – 1977 | Succeeded by Bruce C. Hafen |
