= BYU–Pathway Worldwide =

LDS Church higher education organization

BYU-Pathway Worldwide
- Former name: PathwayConnect
- Established: 2009; 17 years ago
- Parent institution: Church Educational System
- Religious affiliation: The Church of Jesus Christ of Latter-day Saints
- President: Brian K. Ashton
- Students: 74,839 (2024)
- Location: Salt Lake City, Utah, United States (Headquarters)
- Colors: Gold and White
- Website: www.byupathway.edu

BYU–Pathway Worldwide (BYU–PW) is a higher education organization supported by the Church of Jesus Christ of Latter-day Saints (LDS Church).

BYU–PW serves students in more than 180 countries and offers a select list of U.S.-accredited certificates and degrees in partnership with BYU–Idaho and Ensign College. Courses offered through BYU–PW are online and designed to be affordable, flexible, and spiritually grounded. Its mission is to "develop disciples of Jesus Christ who are leaders in their homes, the Church, and their communities."

Since its creation in 2009, BYU–PW enrollment has risen exponentially: from 50 original students to over 17,000 by 2013, more than 38,000 by 2017, and nearly 75,000 by 2024.

BYU-PW's parent organization, the Church Educational System (CES), sponsors four traditional, on-campus schools—Brigham Young University, BYU–Idaho, BYU–Hawaii, and Ensign College—as well as Seminaries and Institutes of Religion. CES Commissioner Clark Gilbert has said that each CES higher educational organization has a distinctive role and strategy, with BYU–PW being "the access provider" and catering to the "hidden many."

In addition to taking academic and religion courses online, students gather weekly in online groups or at local church facilities. Students participate in educational and leadership activities related to the courses, build friendships, and strengthen their faith. Tuition rates are significantly lower than similar educational organizations, with all students eligible for tuition discounts based on need and enrollment status.

== History ==
BYU–PW started in 2009 when BYU–Idaho launched PathwayConnect, a one-year, reduced-cost, online program offered to students wherever they lived.

On February 7, 2017, the LDS Church announced the creation of BYU–PW to provide strategic oversight and leadership for the church's online higher education initiatives, which consists of PathwayConnect and online higher education certificate and degree programs. The certificates and degrees are developed and awarded by BYU–Idaho and Ensign College, with BYU–PW providing student support and online access to courses. Clark Gilbert, formerly a president of BYU–Idaho, was credited with developing the program in 2009 and was BYU–PW's first president from 2017 until 2021, when he was called as an LDS Church general authority. He was succeeded by Brian K. Ashton.

In 2019, it was announced that all LDS Church returning missionaries automatically receive pre-approval for admission to BYU–PW’s PathwayConnect program. Gilbert stated that the program is intended to be scalable and currently has no enrollment cap.

During 2019, BYU–PW served 44,482 distinct students (28,059 in PathwayConnect and 19,355 in online degree programs). PathwayConnect students participated in 500+ locations throughout 145 countries, and online-degree students participated in all 50 states and 87 countries.

In 2020, BYU–PW reached a new milestone by serving 51,583 students. The year marked the first time BYU–PW served more students outside the United States than within it.

Beginning in April 2024, and with approval from the Northwest Commission on Colleges and Universities, BYU–Idaho and Ensign College, began offering 90–96-credit bachelor’s degrees through BYU-PW by eliminating elective credits while preserving required major and general education courses. CES Commissioner Clark Gilbert has said the idea was to create an affordable, spiritually based program for those often priced out of the education market. This degree is available to students in Africa for as low as $300, and for students in the U.S. for an estimated $6,300.

By the end of 2024, BYU–PW had served nearly 75,000 students in 180 countries, and is expected to have over 80,000 students in 2025. As of 2024, 68% of students resided outside the United States, with the highest enrollments in Nigeria, Ghana, and the Philippines. In a podcast interview, BYU–PW president Brian K. Ashton and Vice President of Advancement Matt Eyring discussed how students are securing jobs early in their studies by earning career-boosting certificates before completing their bachelor’s degrees. By partnering with social impact staffing companies, BYU–PW helps connect students to remote and local jobs that offer a sustainable living wage so they can support a family and serve in the LDS Church. Notre Dame professor Viva Bartkus expressed that BYU–PW is now designed to be both an education institution and an economic engine for its students who live in underdeveloped economies.
