= George S. Romney =

President of Ricks Academy

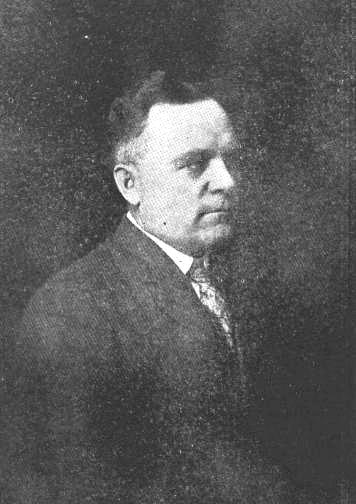
George S. Romney ca 1917

George Samuel Romney (November 12, 1874 – December 19, 1935) was the president of Ricks Academy at the end of the First World War. He was a key figure in helping it to survive the postwar depression.

Romney was a member of the Church of Jesus Christ of Latter-day Saints (LDS Church). He was born in St. George, Utah. When he was young his family moved to the Mormon colonies in Mexico so that his father could continue practicing plural marriage, which was illegal in the United States.

After marrying and having several children, Romney returned to the United States at the start of the Mexican Revolution, specifically to flee the disruptive activities of Pancho Villa. In the summer of 1917 Romney was appointed as principal of Ricks Academy to replace Andrew B. Christensen. In 1918, the school was granted state certification. It was then renamed Ricks Normal College. By the time students returned for Fall Semester they not only had a new name, but they were now led by a president.

Under Romney's leadership the school instituted standards of dress and conduct that all students agreed to follow in 1922.

In 1923, the name of the school was changed again to Ricks College, but Romney continued to lead it in its broadened mission. In 1930 Romney was replaced by Hyrum Manwaring.

After his service as president of Ricks College, Romney served as president of the church's Northern States Mission. He died while serving in this position and was replaced by Bryant S. Hinckley.

Romney's eldest son, Marion G. Romney, became an apostle and a member of the First Presidency of the LDS Church. Romney's daughter, Catherine Romney Cheney, later became a cloistered nun in the Roman Catholic Church. Romney was an uncle of former Michigan governor George W. Romney.

== See also ==
- Pratt-Romney family
- George and Artemisa Romney

== Notes ==
Academic offices
Preceded by Andrew B. Christenson as Principal of Ricks Academy	President of Ricks College; 1923 - 1931	Succeeded by Hyrum Manwaring as President of Ricks College
Preceded by Andrew B. Christenson as Principal of Ricks Academy	President of Ricks Normal College (became Ricks College in 1923); 1917 - 1923	Succeeded by Hyrum Manwaring as President of Ricks College
