= Brigham Young University–Idaho =

Private college in Rexburg, Idaho, US

- Former names: Bannock Stake Academy; (1888–1898); Fremont Stake Academy; (1898–1903); Ricks Academy; (1903–1923); Ricks College; (1923–2001)
- Motto: Rethinking Education
- Type: Private college
- Established: November 12, 1888; 138 years ago
- Parent institution: Church Educational System
- Accreditation: NWCCU
- Religious affiliation: The Church of Jesus Christ of Latter-day Saints
- Academic affiliations: Space-grant
- President: Alvin F. Meredith III
- Students: 45,584 (Fall 2024)
- Location: Rexburg, Idaho, U.S. 43.818°N 111.785°W
- Campus: Rural
- Newspaper: Scroll
- Colors: Blue, black, white, gray
- Nickname: Vikings
- Mascot: Thor the Viking
- Website: byui.edu

Brigham Young University–Idaho (BYU–Idaho or BYUI) is a private college in Rexburg, Idaho. Founded 138 years ago in 1888, the college is owned and operated by the Church of Jesus Christ of Latter-day Saints (LDS Church). Previously known as Ricks College, it transitioned from a junior college to a baccalaureate institution in 2001.

The college's focus is on undergraduate education. When it transitioned to a baccalaureate institution in 2001, BYU-Idaho offered about 50 bachelor's degrees and 19 associate degrees. As of 2024, the institution offers 102 bachelor's degrees (5 of which are online), 22 associate degrees, and 6 other online degrees. It operates on a three-semester system known as "tracks." The college is broadly organized into 35 departments within six colleges.

Its parent organization, the Church Educational System (CES), sponsors three sister schools—Brigham Young University, Brigham Young University–Hawaii, and Ensign College—as well as the educational organizations Seminaries and Institutes of Religion and BYU-Pathway Worldwide. Clark Gilbert, the CES commissioner, said that each CES higher educational organization has a distinctive role and strategy, with BYU-Idaho being "the teacher".

The vast majority of students are Latter-day Saints. All students attending BYU–Idaho agree to follow an honor code that mandates behavior in line with the church's teachings. A significant percentage of students take an 18-month (women) or 24-month (men) hiatus from their studies to serve as missionaries. Tuition rates are generally lower than those at similar universities, due largely to funding provided by the church from tithing donations, various scholarships, financial aid, and on-campus student jobs.

== History ==
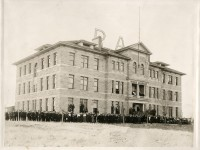
The original Ricks Academy building, completed in 1903

=== Bannock and Fremont stake academies ===
On November 12, 1888, the LDS Church created the Bannock Stake Academy in Rexburg. The precursor to BYU–Idaho, like several other colleges and universities across the mountain west, was established as a "stake academy" first, as Mormon settlers colonized the eastern Snake River Plain in the 1880s. As a stake academy, its purpose was that of a modern secondary school as public schools had not yet been established. Jacob Spori served as its first principal and remained in that role for three years.

As the population grew, it became necessary to divide the geographical area designated by the Church as the Bannock Stake, and the Fremont Stake was created; thus, in 1898, the school was renamed the Fremont Stake Academy.

During the 1901–1902 school year, there were 165 students enrolled. For boys, it taught seventh and eighth grade, a two-year high school, a two-year teaching school, and a missionary course, and for girls it taught a course in plain and needlework.

=== Ricks College ===
In 1902, the LDS Church decided to combine the Fremont, Bingham, and Teton Stakes into one educational district, and the presidency of these stakes became the Board of Education of the LDS church school. Consequently, Bannock Stake Academy needed a new name, and, in 1903, the school was renamed as Ricks Academy in honor of Thomas Ricks. Ricks was the president of the LDS Church's Bannock Stake at the time it was founded and the chairman of the school's first Board of Education. By the early twentieth century, stake academies had largely been discontinued as public schools became more established in the western United States. Ricks Academy survived as it had added a year of college work to its curriculum and in 1917 was granted state certification, which allowed graduates to teach in the state of Idaho. At that point, it was known as Ricks Normal College with George S. Romney as its first president. In 1923, it was renamed Ricks College and functioned as a two-year junior college. It served as a junior college for most of the remainder of the twentieth century, except for a brief period from 1948 to 1956 when it operated as a four-year institution.

In the 1920s and 1930s, the LDS Church began to close, or hand over, its academies to state governments because of better established public education and economic strains on the church. In 1931, a bill was introduced to the Idaho Senate to allow the Idaho Board of Education to accept Ricks College as a gift from the church in order to operate a junior college, but the bill did not pass. Bills handing over Ricks College to the state of Idaho were presented at three more legislative sessions, (1933, 1935, 1937), but all were rejected. After almost a decade of facing closure, the church decided to keep Ricks College open. The college emerged with the support of local patrons and accreditation as a junior college by the Northwest Association of Schools and Colleges in 1936.

The 1950s brought renewed consideration of closing the college and possibly moving it. However, church president David O. McKay decided against this course of action after a visit to the campus. During the 1976 Teton Dam flood, Ricks College was used as a center for disaster relief operations. By the late twentieth century, the college had become the largest private junior college in the country with over 7,500 students.

=== BYU–Idaho ===
On June 21, 2000, the LDS Church announced that Ricks College would become a four-year institution known as Brigham Young University–Idaho. BYU–Idaho became the third BYU campus, after the campuses in Provo and in Hawaii. The name change became official just over a year later on August 10, 2001. For the 2001–2002 school year, its athletics teams continued to compete under the name Ricks College, as the school decided to discontinue all of its sports teams after that season and it did not make financial sense to order all new uniforms with the new name for exactly one season.

Among the associated changes were the elimination of the intercollegiate athletic program and the institution of a larger activities and intramural athletics program. The college also established a "three-track" system which admits students on a specific track of two semesters (including the Spring semester) rather than the standard fall and winter semesters. Among other changes to campus facilities to accommodate the associated growth, the Hyrum Manwaring Student Center was renovated and enlarged and a new auditorium building, the BYU–Idaho Center, with seating for 15,000, was built. The buildings were dedicated in December 2010.

== Campus ==
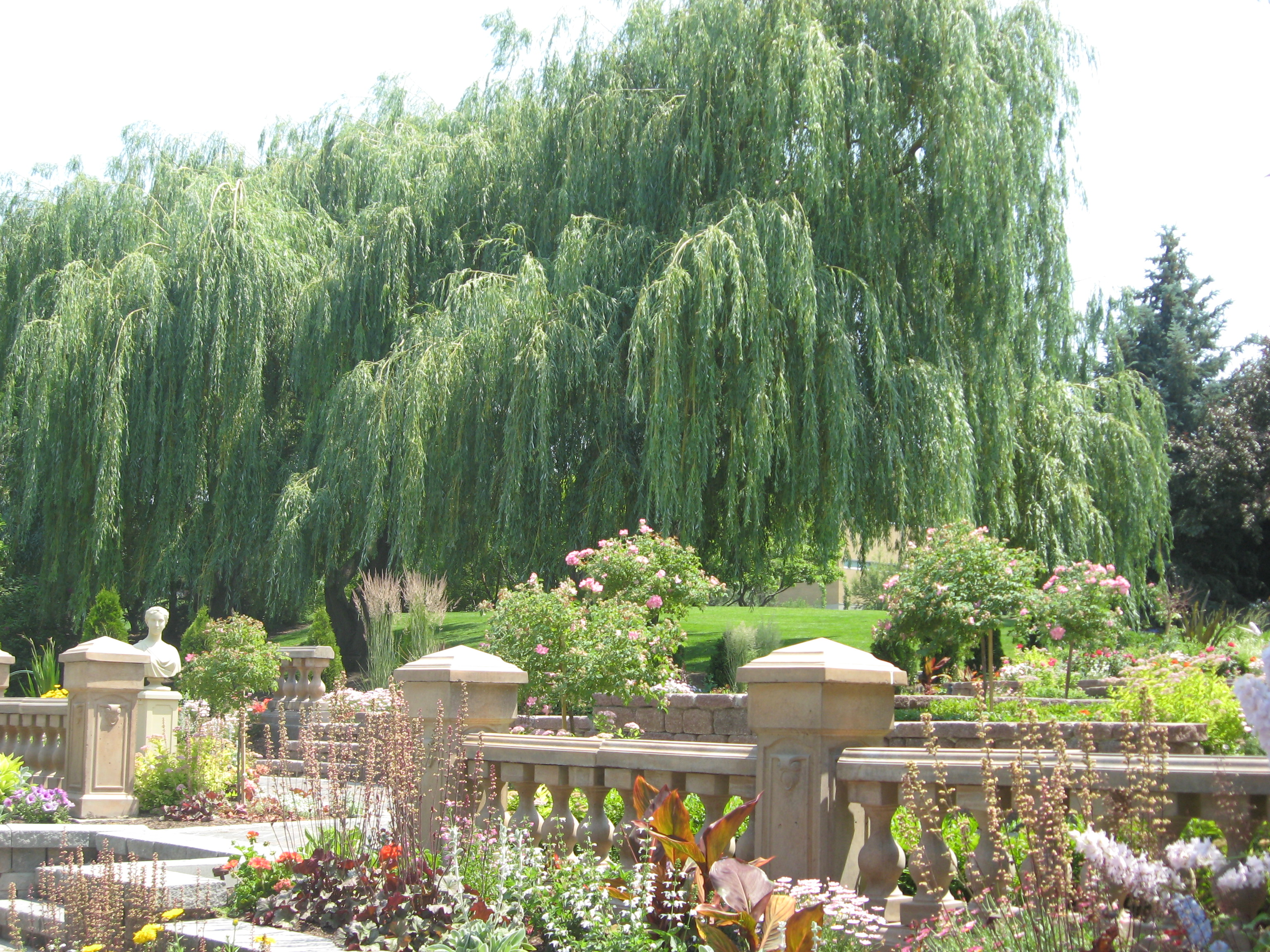
Thomas E. Ricks Memorial Gardens

The campus sits on a hill overlooking the city of Rexburg and the Snake River Valley and includes nearly forty major buildings and residence halls on over 400 acres (1.6 km^{2}). Off-campus facilities include a Livestock Center and the Henry's Fork Outdoor Learning Center near Rexburg. The Teton Lodge and Quickwater Lodge near Victor, Idaho, are utilized as student leadership and service centers.

The main campus includes a planetarium, an arboretum, and geology and wildlife museums. The college also operates several athletic fields and facilities around campus which are used to support intramural programs and the expanded student activities program that was instituted when intercollegiate sports were discontinued in 2001. Facilities include a football and track stadium, tennis courts, general use fields and the John Hart Physical Education building, which seats 4,000 in its main gym and is used for athletic events and concerts. The building also includes a large fitness center, a pool, auxiliary gymnasiums, racquetball courts and equipment room, all of which are open to students, faculty and staff. On December 17, 2010, the BYU–Idaho Center was dedicated and opened to students. The 435,000-square-foot (40,400 m^{2}) building contains a 15,000-seat auditorium used for the weekly campus devotional, graduation ceremonies and concerts. The building also features a multi-purpose area with 10 basketball courts and can be subdivided by drop dividers as needed. The David O. McKay Library holds a collection of over 300,000 volumes with about 142,000 transactions processed by the library's circulation services annually.

In support of the fine arts and entertainment, the campus also includes the Ruth H. Barrus Concert Hall which houses the acclaimed Ruffatti organ, the third largest organ owned by the Church after those housed in the Salt Lake Tabernacle and Conference Center, respectively. KBYI-FM, a 100,000 watt public radio station, also broadcasts to eastern Idaho and parts of Wyoming and Montana from the campus.

== Organization ==
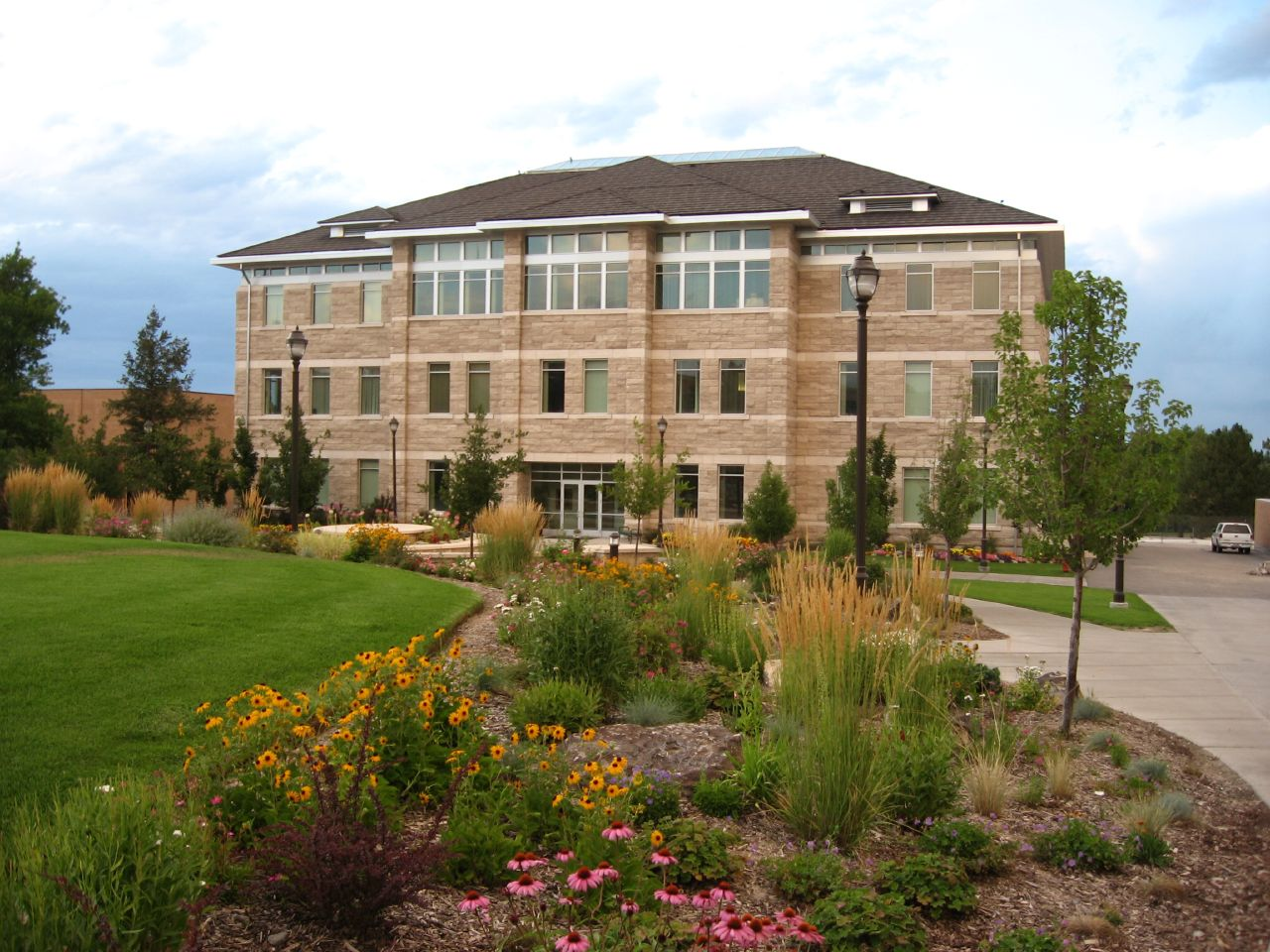
The rebuilt Jacob Spori Building, home to BYU-Idaho Scroll

BYU-Idaho is led by Alvin "Trip" F. Meredith, a church general authority, who began serving as president in August 2023. Along with other members of CES, BYU–Idaho is under the direction of a board of trustees, which includes the First Presidency, members of the Quorum of the Twelve, other general authorities, and presidents of church organizations. BYU–Idaho is organized into six colleges:

- College of Health and Life Sciences
- College of Business and Communication
- College of Education and Human Development

- College of Language and Letters
- College of Performing and Visual Arts
- College of Science, Technology, Engineering and Mathematics

== Academics ==
Academic rankings

Baccalaureate
- Washington Monthly: 16

Regional
- U.S. News & World Report: 9

National
- Forbes: 324

BYU–Idaho offers several associate-degree programs in addition to its bachelor-degree programs. Across the six colleges, there are thirty-three departments, offering over eighty-seven bachelor-level programs and twenty associate-degree programs. BYU–Idaho's engineering programs rank in the top 75 nationally.

The academic year is divided into three equal semesters (fall, winter, spring) of fourteen weeks and is known as the "three-track" system. It was instituted in 2001 as part of the transition from Ricks College to BYU-Idaho and the school's "Rethinking Education" campaign. When a student is admitted to BYU–Idaho, they are also assigned to a specific two-semester "track," (fall-winter, winter-spring, or spring-fall) based partly on preference, degree program, and availability to balance. Initially, the fall and winter semesters were slightly longer (and thus more heavily attended) than the summer semester and had more class options. Beginning in January 2007, the school adjusted the academic calendar equalizing the amount of time available in each semester, lengthening the class periods, and opening class offerings in the spring to allow more students to attend in the spring semester. There is also a short, seven week summer session with accelerated class schedules. BYU-Idaho also offers "fast grad" which allows students to attend all semesters and finish their degree sooner. This is usually available as an option to students who have an upper sophomore or higher standing.

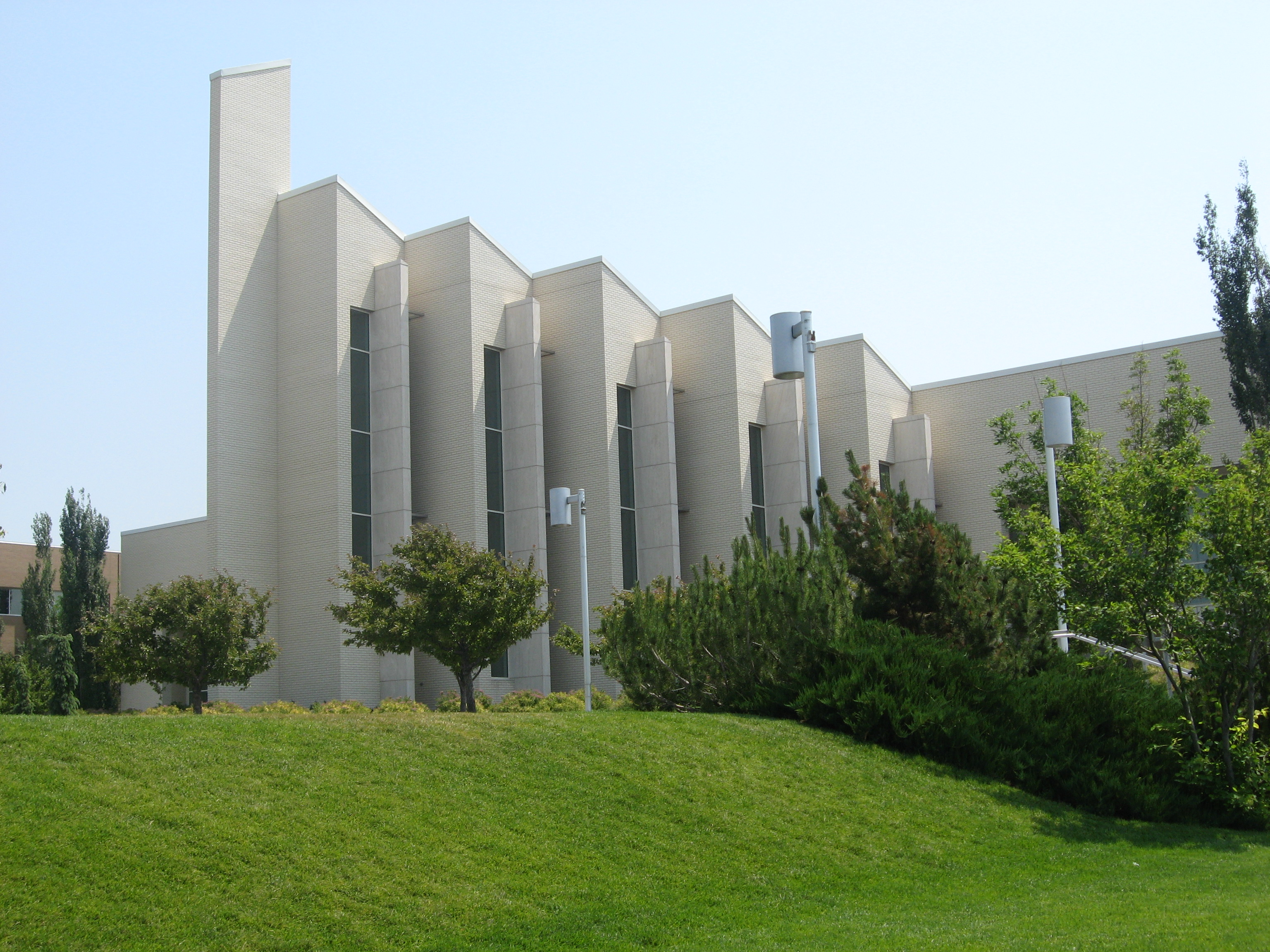
The John Taylor Building, used mainly for religious education

As of the Winter 2024 semester, at BYU-Idaho, there were 17,578 on-campus students, 4,673 campus students taking online classes or participating in internships off campus, and 19,312 online students served in partnership with BYU–Pathway Worldwide for a total of 41,563 students. Students come from all 50 states and more than 130 countries. According to fall 2016 enrollment numbers, 27% of BYU-Idaho campus students came from the state of Idaho, with the majority of students coming from five states: Idaho 27%, California 14%, Utah 10%, Washington 8%, and Arizona 4.5%. Thus, the student body at BYU–Idaho is notably homogeneous—not only due to its geographic representation but also due to ethnicity and religion. During the Fall 2016 semester, 83% of the students were white. Moreover, during the Fall 2016 semester, 99.7% of the students were members of the LDS Church.

== Athletics ==
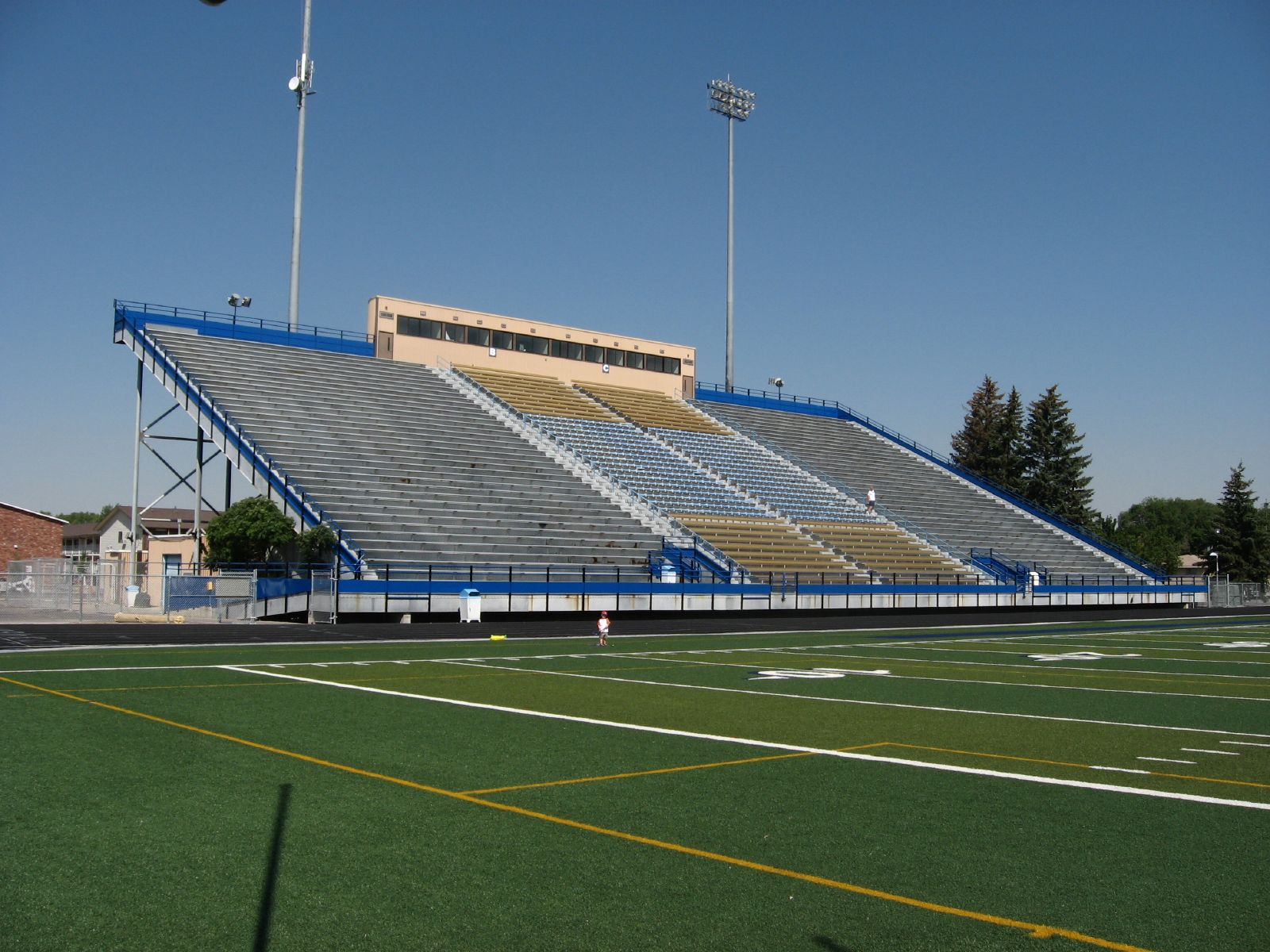
BYU-Idaho Stadium in 2007 (formerly Viking Stadium)

=== Ricks Vikings ===
Known as the Vikings, Ricks College fielded an intercollegiate athletics program from 1919 to 2002 in the National Junior College Athletic Association, earning 17 national championships, 61 individual national titles, and producing nearly 100 first-team All-Americans. National title wins included Women's Cross Country (1988, 1989, 1995, 1996, 1997, 1998, 1999, 2000, 2001), Men's Cross Country (1965, 1966, 1986, 1999, 2000, 2001), Women's Track and Field (1997), and Women's Volleyball (1974; AIAW). More than 25 alumni who played football for Ricks went on to play professionally in the National Football League or Canadian Football League.

It was announced in June 2000 that the athletics program would be phased out as part of the change from a junior college to a four-year college, due mainly to the costs associated with running a college athletic department, and the desire to develop a more comprehensive participatory student activities program.

=== Athletics as a four-year college ===
The 2001–02 school year was the first as BYU-Idaho although its athletics teams continued to compete under the name Ricks College. Because the school had decided to discontinue all of its sports teams after that season, it did not make financial sense to order all new uniforms with the new name for exactly one season.

Following the 2001–02 school year, BYU-Idaho no longer hosted intercollegiate athletic teams but instead developed a competitive (or, as the school uses, "intracollegiate") athletics program which functions as part of Student Activities. Several teams from within the school compete against one another in a variety of sports throughout the year, complete with regular seasons and playoffs.

== Student life ==
=== Latter-day Saint atmosphere ===
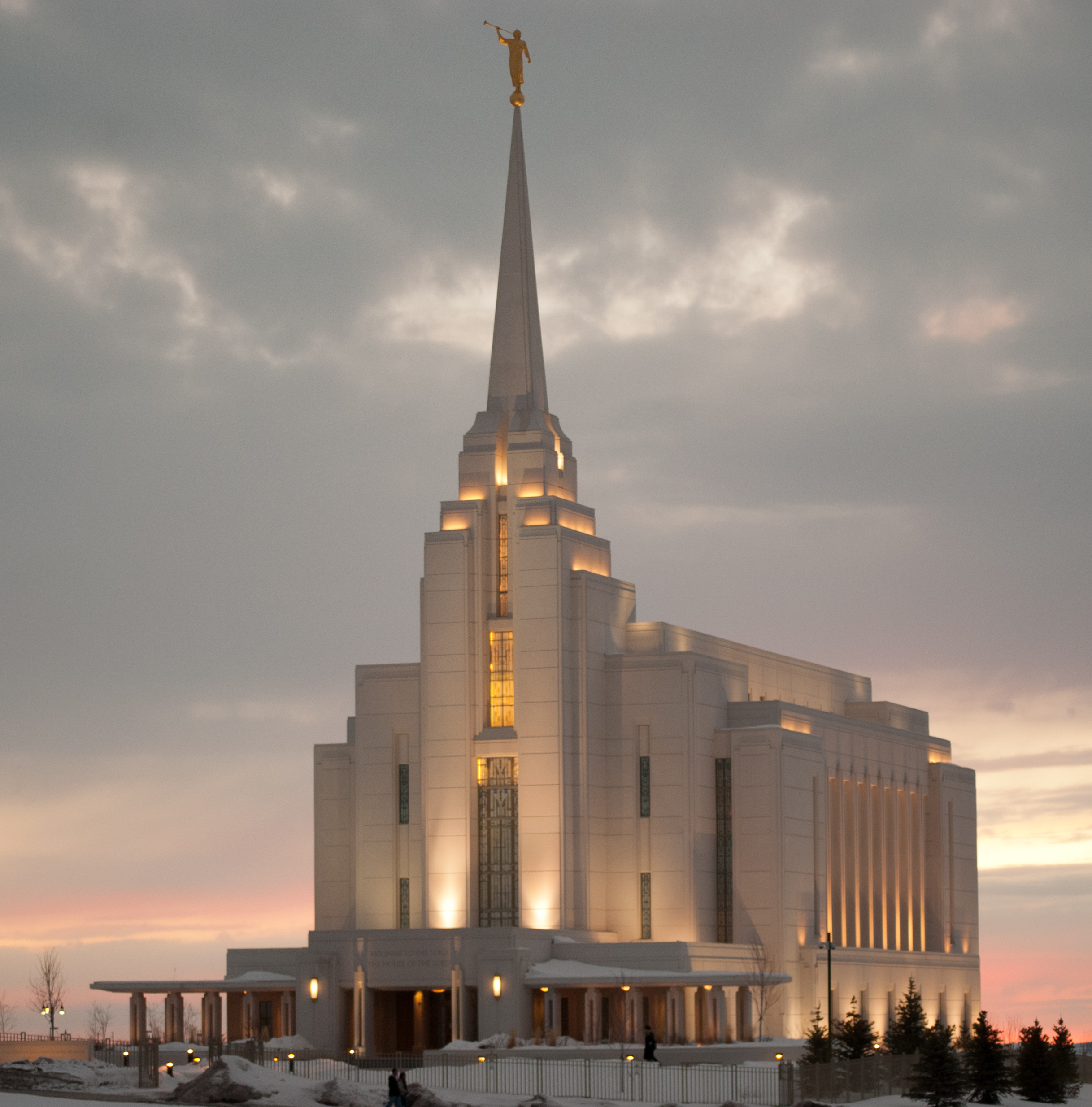
The Rexburg Idaho Temple, located adjacent to the BYU–Idaho campus

The atmosphere at BYU–Idaho is different from most other universities due to its affiliation with the LDS Church. For example, almost every Tuesday that school is in session, a devotional is held on campus. During the devotional, no classes are held, administrative offices close, and students and faculty are encouraged to attend the hour-long worship service either in person (in the BYU–Idaho Center), via campus TV, or on the radio at KBYI 94.3 FM. Speakers are selected from the campus and local communities, as well as from church general authorities who share a spiritually uplifting message. The school's honor code also requires students to regularly attend church services, which are held every Sunday.

Until the construction of the Rexburg Idaho Temple in 2008, BYU–Idaho had been the only college or university affiliated with the LDS Church that did not have a nearby temple.

Tim Grieve of Salon wrote in 2006 that the school was a "booming, bucolic un-Berkeley".

=== Culture ===
Despite its transition from Ricks College to BYU-Idaho, leaders of the college have maintained the desire to preserve what they call the "Spirit of Ricks," a campus tradition of service, hard work, friendliness, compassion and cooperation. The college's relative geographic isolation from a metropolitan area, combined with the strong moral standards taught and encouraged by the college and its sponsoring organization, contribute to a unique student culture with some similarities to the other campuses owned by the LDS Church. Alcohol and drug use is virtually nonexistent, as these substances are strictly prohibited by the school's honor code and the church. There is also no Greek system.

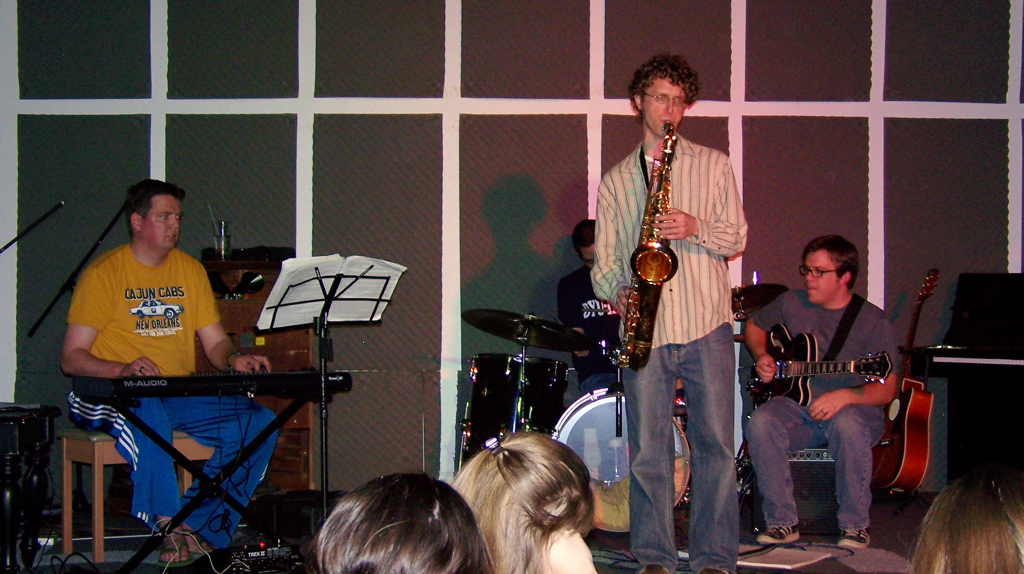
Students from the BYU–Idaho Jazz Combos class performing at a local club

Much of BYU–Idaho student life revolves around events sponsored by the school organization Student Activities, which frequently hosts dances, concerts, sports events, and service projects.

Rexburg is situated in a strong northern climate in which winter dominates, and as such, winter sports such as downhill and cross-country skiing and snowboarding are popular. There are two nearby ski resorts, Grand Targhee and Kelly Canyon, which are frequented by students. However, Rexburg also experiences warm summers that are ideal for many outdoor recreational activities. The proximity of BYU-Idaho to both Grand Teton and Yellowstone national park, along with other state parks, national forests and nearby rivers make hiking, fishing, camping, mountain biking, and river floats popular summertime activities.

=== Honor Code ===
All students and faculty, regardless of religion, are required to agree to adhere to an honor code. Early forms of the BYU Honor Code are found as far back as the days of the Brigham Young Academy and educator Karl G. Maeser. Maeser created the "Domestic Organization", which was a group of teachers who would visit students at their homes to see that they were following the school's moral rules prohibiting obscenity, profanity, smoking, and alcohol consumption. The honor code itself was created in 1940 at BYU and was used mainly for cases of cheating and academic dishonesty. Ernest L. Wilkinson expanded the honor code in 1957 to include other school standards (at the time, Wilkinson, as president of BYU, and the director of what was then the Unified Church School System, had some authority over all of the church's schools). The honor code today includes rules regarding dress, grooming, and academic honesty; it also prohibits extra-marital sex and homosexual behavior, alcohol, coffee, tea, and drugs. A signed commitment to live the honor code is part of the application process for all Latter-day Saint-affiliated schools and must be adhered to by all students, faculty, and staff. Students and faculty found in violation of standards are either warned or called to meet with representatives of the honor council. In rare cases, students and faculty can be expelled from the college for excessive misbehavior.

In addition to the general honor code, other prohibited items include bib overalls, baseball caps (common at all Latter-day Saint schools, the BYU–Idaho Honor Code prohibits those items inside classrooms), flip-flops (sandals), and also any worn, faded, or patched clothing on campus.

Students and faculty must receive an ecclesiastical endorsement to be accepted to the college. To receive this endorsement, applicants meet with their local religious leaders and pledge their willingness to abide by the honor code. Once admitted, students then meet with their ecclesiastical leaders annually to renew this commitment. Ecclesiastical leaders may revoke a student or faculty member's endorsement for any reason, which may lead to suspension or expulsion from the college.

Single students under the age of 25 are required to live in housing that is approved by the college. All approved housing options are located within a mile of the college. Co-ed housing is prohibited according to the honor code but some complexes have separate buildings for men and women. Married students and older single students are not required to live in approved housing and may live wherever they choose.

=== Health insurance ===
As with most higher education institutions, full-time students are required to have health insurance. In fall 2019, BYU–Idaho announced that students would no longer receive a waiver that allows Medicaid to qualify as their health coverage, saying that "Due to the healthcare needs of tens of thousands of students enrolled annually on the campus of BYU-Idaho, it would be impractical for the local medical community and infrastructure to support them with only Medicaid coverage." Students without coverage or with only Medicaid coverage were required to obtain other health insurance options, which could have included purchasing the school's student health insurance plan.

A week later, BYU–Idaho reversed its decision, stating that Medicaid would qualify under the requirement for students to have insurance, although BYU–Idaho's Student Health Center would continue not be a Medicaid service provider.

== Alumni ==
As of Fall 2017, BYU–Idaho had approximately 200,000 alumni, including those from the period when the institution functioned as an academy (equivalent to a modern high school). The college's alumni include two-time Olympic gold medalist Rulon Gardner, Idaho State Senator Fred S. Martin, comedian Ryan Hamilton and professional baseball player Matt Lindstrom. Another alumnus is Marion G. Romney, a former counselor in the First Presidency of the LDS Church, who was valedictorian of the Ricks Academy class of 1918.

== Sources ==
- Crowder, David L. (1997), The Spirit of Ricks: A History of Ricks College, Ricks College Press, ISBN 096115201X
