= List of Mormon missionary entries by country =

The following list indicates when missionaries of the Church of Jesus Christ of Latter-day Saints (LDS Church) first preached in the territory of present-day countries.

Country	Year	First official church missionary	Notes
United States	1830	Samuel H. Smith	Smith is regarded as the "first missionary" of the LDS Church. He preached in New York in June 1830.
Canada	1830	Joseph Smith, Sr. and Don Carlos Smith	Although Phineas Young preached in Upper Canada several months before the Smiths, when he did so he was not a member of the church and therefore was not an official missionary of the church. The Smiths preached in villages north of the St. Lawrence River in Upper Canada in September 1830.
United Kingdom	1837	Heber C. Kimball and Orson Hyde	Kimball and Hyde first preached in Preston, England
Ireland	1840	John Taylor, James McGuffie, and William Black	A few months before Taylor, McGuffie, and Black arrived in Ireland, Reuben Headlock preached in Belfast, which was part of Ireland at the time but which is now in Northern Ireland in the United Kingdom
Australia	1840	William Barratt	Barratt was a 17-year-old convert from England whose family emigrated to Australia. Before his departure, he was set apart as a missionary to Australia.
Netherlands	1841	Orson Hyde	Hyde spent a week in Rotterdam and Amsterdam preaching to rabbis.
Germany	1841	Orson Hyde	A British church member named James Howells preached in Germany in 1840, but he was not an official missionary of the church.
Turkey	1841	Orson Hyde	Hyde preached in Istanbul.
Israel	1841	Orson Hyde	Hyde preached in Jerusalem and dedicated Palestine for the return of the Jews.
Palestine	1841	Orson Hyde	Hyde preached in Jerusalem and dedicated Palestine for the return of the Jews.
French Polynesia	1844	Addison Pratt, Noah Rogers, and Benjamin Franklin Grouard	Preached first in Tubuai. Preached in Tahitian; first official church missionaries to preach in a language other than English.
Channel Islands	1848		
France	1849	William Howells	
Denmark	1850	Erastus Snow, Peter O. Hansen, John E. Forsgren, and George P. Dykes	First preached in Copenhagen
Italy	1850	Lorenzo Snow, Joseph Toronto, and Thomas Stenhouse	First preached in Genoa
Sweden	1850	John E. Forsgren	
Switzerland	1850	Thomas Stenhouse and Lorenzo Snow	First preached in Geneva
Norway	1851	Hans F. Petersen	Petersen was one of the first converts baptized in Denmark
Iceland	1851	Gudmund Gudmundson and Thorarinn Thorason	Gudmundson and Torason joined the church in Denmark and were sent back to their native Iceland as missionaries.
India	1851	Joseph Richards	Church members Benjamin Richey and George Barber preached in India in 1849, but they were not official missionaries of the church.
Chile	1851	Parley P. Pratt, Phoebe Pratt and Rufus C. Allen	Phoebe was one of Parley's plural wives.
Malta	1852	Lorenzo Snow and Jabez Woodard	
South Africa	1853	Jesse Haven, Leonard L. Smith, and William H. Walker	Preached first in Cape Town. In 1852, Joseph Richards spent nearly a month in Cape Town on his way home from his assigned mission in India. He distributed some tracts and preached a few sermons. Haven, Smith, and Walker were the first missionaries specifically assigned to South Africa.
Hong Kong	1853	Hosea Stout, James Lewis, and Chapman Duncan	The missionaries were called to preach in China, but conditions allowed them to only preach in Hong Kong, which was a British colony at the time.
Jamaica	1853	Darwin Richardson, Aaron F. Fan, Jesse Turpin, and A. B. Lambson	
Sri Lanka	1853	Chauncey W. West and Benjamin F. Dewey	
New Zealand	1854	Augustus Farnham, William Cooke, and Thomas Holder	Preached first in Auckland, Wellington, and Nelson
Thailand	1854	Elam Luddington	Preached first in Bangkok.
Mauritius	1856	George Kershaw	
Samoa	1863	Kimo Pelia and Samuela Manoa	
Austria	1865	Orson Pratt and William W. Ritter	
Mexico	1876	Daniel Webster Jones and Ammon N. Tenney	
Finland	1876	Carl A. Sundstrom and John E. Sundstrom	Preached first in Vaasa.
Czech Republic	1884	Thomas Biesinger	Preached in Prague.
Hungary	1885	Thomas Biesinger and Paul Hammer	Preached in Budapest.
Belgium	1888	Mischa Markow	Preached in Antwerp.
Tonga	1891	Brigham Smoot and Alva J. Butler	Met with and granted permission from King George Tupou I before preaching.
Russia	1895	August Höglund	Preached in St. Petersburg.
Syria	1898		
Greece	1899	Ferdinand F. Hintze	
Serbia	1899	Mischa Markow	Preached in Belgrade.
Croatia	1899	Mischa Markow	
Romania	1899	Mischa Markow	
Cook Islands	1899	Osborne J. P. Widtsoe and Mervin Davis	preached first in Rarotonga
Bulgaria	1900	Mischa Markow	
Japan	1901	Heber J. Grant, Horace S. Ensign, Louis A. Kelsch, and Alma O. Taylor	
Latvia	1903	Mischa Markow	Preached in Riga.
Argentina	1925	Rulon S. Wells and Rey Pratt	Preached first in Buenos Aires. Wells preached in German and Pratt preached in Spanish.
Brazil	1928	Rheinhold Stoof, William F. Heinz, and Emil Schindler	Preaching began among German speakers.
Slovakia	1929	Arthur Gaeth	Gaeth was the first mission president of the Czechoslovakia Mission. Thomas Biesinger had previously preached within Czechoslovakia, but only in the current territory of the Czech Republic.
Zimbabwe	1930	George C. Maw, Vern D. Greene, and Bertram C. Cutforth	
Costa Rica	1946	Arwell L. Pierce, Robert B. Miller, and David D. Lingard	
Guatemala	1947	Seth G. Mattice, Earl E. Hansen, Robert B. Miller, and David D. Lingard	
Uruguay	1947	Frederick S. Williams	
El Salvador	1949	Glenn W. Skousen and Omer Farnsworth	
Paraguay	1950	Frederick S. Williams, Sister Williams and William S. Farnsworth	The first baptism was performed by Samuel J. Skousen, a former missionary in Argentina who was then working as the military attache to the United States Embassy in Paraguay, he baptized Carlos Alerto Rodriguez, having previously been authorized to do so by the First Presidency. Williams was president of the Argentine Mission when he went with his wife and Elder Farnsworth to begin missionary work in Paraguay. Three additional missionaries, Keith J. Morris, Norval C. Jesperson and Daryl L. Anderson were sent after President Williams had determined that the government would allow missionary work to proceed.
Honduras	1952	James T. Thorup and George W. Allen	
Niue	1952	Thayne Christensen	Fritz Bunge-Kruger and his family arrived earlier in 1952 and traveled about the island doing missionary work, but none of the members of the family were official church missionaries
Nicaragua	1953	Manuel Arias and Archie R. Mortensen	
Fiji	1954	Boyd L. Harris and Sheldon L. Abbott	
South Korea	1954	Richard L. Detton and Don G. Powell	
Faroe Islands	1958		
Bolivia	1964		Sterling Nicolayson was President of the Andes Mission; he met with American expatriate members in Bolivia in October to November. Missionaries under him arrived in late November and baptized their first covert, Victor Walter Vallejos, just before Christmas. In 1962 Norval Jesperson, who had been among the first six missionaries in Paraguay, became the director of the American-Bolivian Center in Cochabamba. He shared the gospel with several people and baptized Maria van Gemerfen.
Peru	1956	Darwin Thomas, Edward T. Hall, Donald L. Hokanson, Shirrel M. Plowman	
Taiwan	1956	Weldon J. Kitchen, Keith Madsen, Duane W. Dean, and Melvin C. Fish	
Guam	1957		
Philippines	1961	Ray Goodson, Harry Murray, Kent Lowe, and Nestor Ledesma	
Luxembourg	1963	Hyrum M. Smith and Gerald E. Malmrose	
Puerto Rico	1964	Verl Tolbert and Dwight K. Hunter	The first baptisms of Puerto Ricans in Puerto Rico had occurred May 7, 1959 when Cristina Burk and Irma Haws, both of whom were married to American Mormons, were baptized. Tolbert and Hunter mainly worked with US military personnel in Puerto Rico, although they did baptize Becky Farticelli, the first Puerto Rican convert who did not have familial connections to the U.S. mainland. Steven Johnson and Craig Van Tassell in 1969 were the first missionaries in Puerto Rico to preach in Spanish.
Macau	1964	Darryl Thomander and Gilbert Montano	
Ecuador	1965	Craig Carpenter, Bryant R. Gold, Lindon Robinson, and Paul O. Allen	
Panama	1965	Ted E. Brewerton	
Colombia	1966	Randall Harmsen and Jerry Broome	Preached first in Bogotá.
Bermuda	1966		
Venezuela	1967	Ted E. Brewerton, Floyd Baum, Neil Gruwell, David Bell, and Fred Podlesny	
Singapore	1968	Kim A. Shipley, Joel Richards III, Rhett T. Bake and Melvin D. Shurtz	
New Caledonia	1968	Harold Richards and Jeannine Richards	
Spain	1970	Clark Hinckley and a few others.	
Indonesia	1970	Frank Willard, Dale Storer, Robert Meier, Ross Marchant, Greg Hawker, and Larry Hunt	
Kiribati	1972	Eb L. Davis	
Malaysia	1972		Elam Luddington had preached on the island of Penang in 1854. Anthony Lim, the first Malaysian baptized in Malaysia, was baptized on December 3, 1972.
Vietnam	1973	Colin B. Van Orman, James L. Chrisensen, David T. Posey, and Richard C. Holloman	
Portugal	1974	William Grant Bangerter	
Slovenia	1975	Neil D. Schaerrer	
Vanuatu	1975	Asaeli Mokofisi and Peni Malohifo’ou (of Tonga) and Brett Edward Olsen and Rodvern Lowry (of Canada)	
Northern Mariana Islands	1975	Jeff Frame and Callis Carlton	
Iran	1975	Kent Bowman, Randy Clark, Kerry Riley, and Derrin Watson	
Micronesia	1976	George L. Mortensen and Aldric Porter	Preached first on Pohnpei.
Marshall Islands	1977	William Wardel and Steven Cooper	
Poland	1977	Matthew and Marion Ciembronowicz	
Trinidad and Tobago	1977	Chris Doty, Doug Mathews, Randy Clark, and David Roos	
Dominican Republic	1978	John A. Davis and Ada Davis	Latter-day Saints Eddie Amparo and Mercedes Amparo preached prior to 1978, but they were not official missionaries of the church.
Ghana	1978	Edwin Q. "Ted" Cannon, Janath Cannon, Rendell N. Mabey, Rachel Mabey	Billy Johnson and others had shared the Book of Mormon with many people in Ghana and even been recognized as The Church of Jesus Christ of Latter-day Saints by the government in 1968, but none of these people had been baptized. Immediately after the June 1978 Revelation on Priesthood, Ted Cannon, and Merrill J. Bateman had made a short fact-finding trip to Ghana and Nigeria where they laid the final ground-work for the entry of missionaries a few months later. The missions of the Cannons and the Mabeys resulted in the baptism of several hundred people, most of whom were among those prepared by Johnson and his associates.
Nigeria	1978	Edwin Q. "Ted" Cannon, Janath Cannon, Rendell N. Mabey, Rachel Mabey	See note on Ghana, above. In Nigeria there had been others who set up unofficial congregations of the LDS Church, such as Anthony Obina.
Suriname	1978	John Limburg and Beverly Limburg	
Palau	1978	Ron Brown and Stanton Akana	
United States Virgin Islands	1978		
Curaçao	1978		
Réunion	1979		
Belize	1980	Samuel Flores and Robert Henke	
Haiti	1980	Glenn E. Stringham	
Papua New Guinea	1980	L. Douglas Johnson and Eva Johnson	
St. Vincent and the Grenadines	1980	Steven B. Wooley and Terry Williams	
St. Lucia	1983	Todd Hardy, Paul Jackson, Jay Schroeder, and Marty Harris	
Martinique	1983	Kenneth Zabriskie	
St. Kitts and Nevis	1984	Douglas Myers and Robert J. Molina	
Antigua and Barbuda	1984	Ralph Tate and Aileen Tate	
Nauru	1984	Joseph B. Keeler	
Tuvalu	1984	Joseph B. Keeler, Glen Cornwall, and Shirley Cornwall	
Guadeloupe	1984		
Grenada	1985	Robert W. Hoffmaster and Leonard G. Gill	
Cayman Islands	1985		
Democratic Republic of the Congo	1986	R. Bay Hutchings and Jean Hutchings	
Eswatini	1987	Kenneth Edwards and Betty Edwards	
Liberia	1987	J. Duffy Palmer and Jacelyn Palmer	
Aruba	1987	Clay Jorgensen and Julio Gonzalez	
Guyana	1988	Benjamin Hudson and Ruth Hudson	
Cape Verde	1988	Marion K. Hamblin, Christopher Lee, and Ken Margetts	
Ivory Coast	1988	Barnard S. Silver and Cherry Silver	
Sierra Leone	1988		
Lesotho	1989	Marc Modersitzki and Bradley Saunderson	
Cyprus	1989	James O. Henrie and Evelyn H. Henrie	
French Guiana	1989		
Botswana	1990	R. J. Stone	
Namibia	1990		
Uganda	1990	Lark Washburn and Arlea Washburn	
Estonia	1990	Gary L. Browning	Browning was the president of the Finland Helsinki East Mission, which had jurisdiction over Estonia.
Ukraine	1991	Gary L. Browning	Browning was the president of the Finland Helsinki East Mission, which had jurisdiction over Ukraine.
Kenya	1991		
Republic of Congo	1991		
Mongolia	1992	Kenneth H. Beesley and Donna Beesley	
Malawi	1992	James Griggs and Diane Griggs	
Tanzania	1992		
Albania	1992		
Lithuania	1992	Gary L. Browning; Robert A. Rees and Ruth Rees	Browning was president of the Helsinki Finland East Mission, which had jurisdiction over Lithuania. The Rees were the first missionaries assigned to preach in Lithuania.
Angola	1993		
Cameroon	1993		
Central African Republic	1993	"a French missionary couple"	
Ethiopia	1993	Eugene Hilton and Ruth Hilton	
Madagascar	1993		
Pakistan	1993		
Belarus	1993		
Cambodia	1994		
Solomon Islands	1995	E. Crawford Jones and Judith Jones	
Moldova	1997		
Benin	1998		
Mozambique	1999		
Togo	1999	Dermoine A. Findlay and Joyce Findlay	
Georgia	1999	Philip Reber and Betty Reber	
Kazakhstan	2001	Barry A. Baker and Tamara H. Baker	
Dominica	2006		
Laos	2006		
Turks and Caicos Islands	2008		
Burundi	2010		
Kosovo	2011	Griseld Merepeza and Eliot Steimle	
North Macedonia	2012	Joel Kay and Chase Adams	
Montenegro	2012	Tyran Schouten and Taylor Nelson	
Bosnia and Herzegovina	2012	Philander Knox Smartt Jr. and Gloria Rose Smartt	
Senegal	2017	"Missionaries from the Cote d'Ivoire Mission"	

== Countries where LDS Church missionaries have not preached ==
Official LDS Church missionaries have never preached in the following countries and territories:

- Afghanistan
- Algeria
- Anguilla
- Azerbaijan
- Bahrain
- Bangladesh
- Bhutan
- British Virgin Islands
- Brunei
- Burkina Faso
- Burma
- Chad
- China
- Comoros
- Cuba
- Djibouti
- East Timor
- Eritrea
- Equatorial Guinea
- Falkland Islands
- Gambia
- Greenland
- Guinea-Bissau
- Iraq
- Kyrgyzstan
- Libya
- Liechtenstein
- Maldives
- Mali
- Mauritania
- Monaco
- Morocco
- Nepal
- Niger
- Norfolk Island
- North Korea
- Oman
- Pitcairn Islands
- Qatar
- San Marino
- Saudi Arabia
- Seychelles
- Somalia
- South Sudan
- Sudan
- Tunisia
- Turkmenistan
- United Arab Emirates
- Uzbekistan
- Vatican City
- Wallis and Futuna
- Yemen

Missionaries have preached in Hong Kong, and Macau; 1 Feb 1834 Orson Pratt came to China and held meetings; Missionaries also called 28 August 1852 to China by Brigham Young; 7–8 March 1853, 109 Elders called to various missions among them China. Additionally, LDS missionaries are currently not preaching in a number of countries where they have preached previously, including Israel/Palestine, Iran, Laos, Lebanon, and Syria.
