= The Church of Jesus Christ of Latter-day Saints in Ghana =

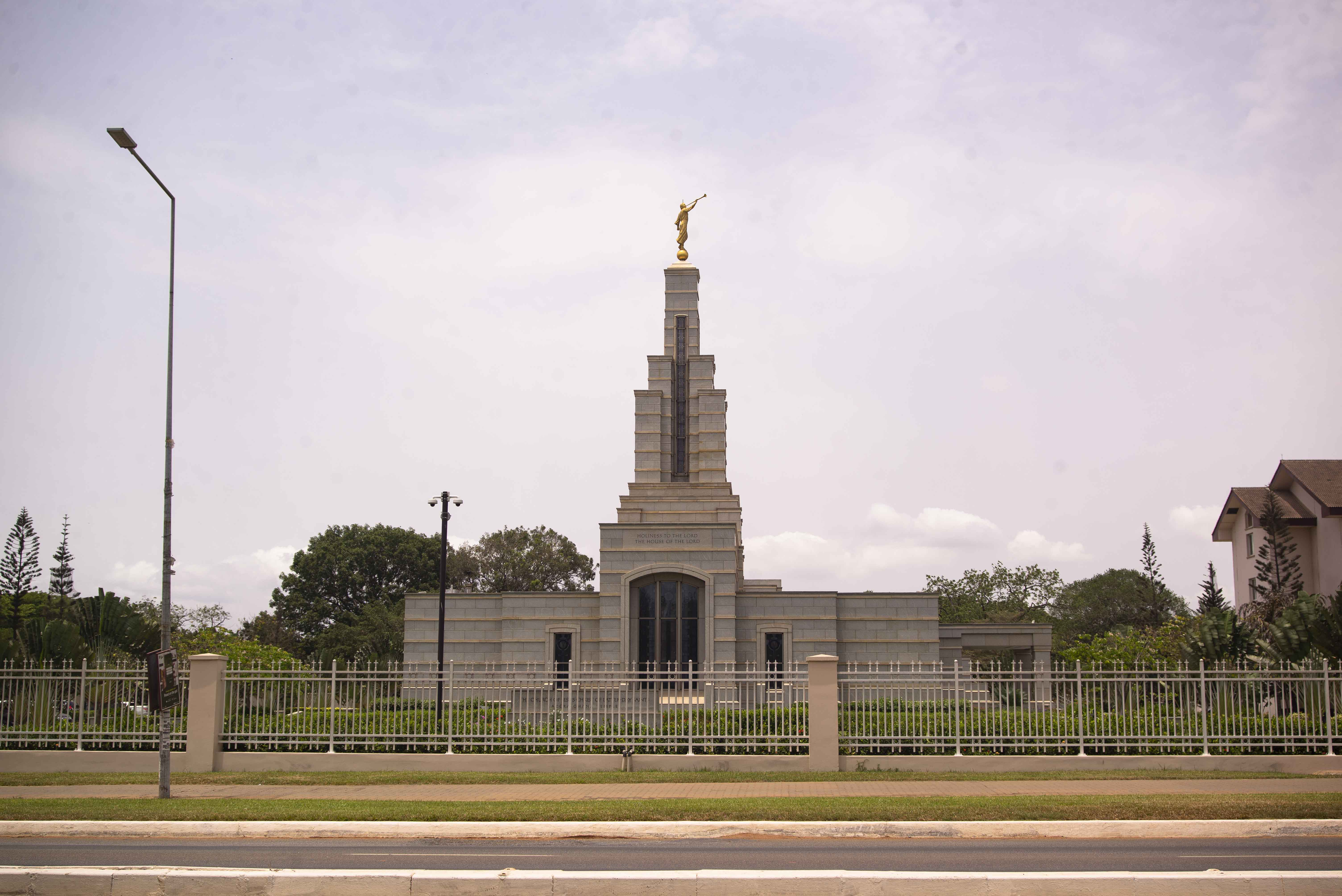
- The Accra Ghana Temple
- Area: Africa West
- Members: 122,978 (2025)
- Stakes: 31
- Districts: 13
- Wards: 216
- Branches: 185
- Total Congregations: 401
- Missions: 6
- Temples: 1 operating; 1 under construction; 1 announced; 3 total
- FamilySearch Centers: 89

The Church of Jesus Christ of Latter-day Saints (LDS Church) was introduced to Ghana, West Africa, in 1962. It was officially organized in 1978, following announcement of the revelation on priesthood. As of 2025, the LDS Church reported 122,978 members in 401 congregations in Ghana, making it the third largest body of LDS Church members in Africa, behind Nigeria and the Democratic Republic of the Congo. In 2025, Ghana ranked as having the third most LDS Church members per capita in Africa, behind Cape Verde and Sierra Leone.

== The early church ==
Membership in Ghana
Year	Membership
1979	400
1983	826
1990*	8,970
1999	17,278
2009	40,872
2019	89,135
2025	122,978
*Membership was published as a rounded number.

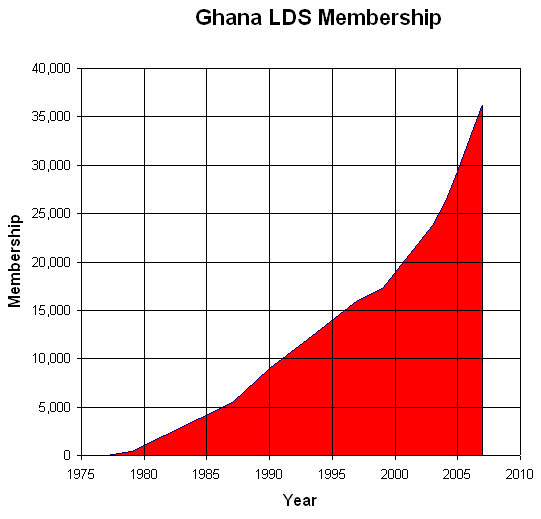
Ghana LDS membership history

The following statistics are from the Church Growth Almanac:

In 1962, the LDS Church came to Ghana through a convert, Raphael Abraham Frank Mensah. He published a public plea for support in his religious efforts and a woman living in England read them. The woman was not a member of the LDS Church, but sent material she received from the church's missionaries to Mensah in Ghana. Upon reading the material, Mensah organized his own informal congregation in Accra. He reached out to church president David O. McKay asking for more literature, missionaries, and assistance, but official church support did not come. In 1964, he gave Joseph William Billy Johnson a copy of the Book of Mormon. Johnson converted and became an industrious leader. He organized branches and converted many people, despite persecution from others in his country. Without any official recognition from church headquarters, leaders established a primary school called the Brigham Young Educational Institute and congregations in Cape Coast. There were unofficial visits from church members during this time, beginning with Virginia Cutler of Brigham Young University, who was also a visiting professor at the University of Ghana. She sent literature and encouraged the members to continue in the faith. Others from church headquarters that met with members were M. Neff Smart, Merrill J. Bateman, Edwin Q. "Ted" Cannon, and Lynn M. Hilton. All these visits were unofficial. During Hilton's visit, he recalls members passing around a Book of Mormon that was so used, its pages were folded and dark. Members exchanged it and read for a few minutes at a time. Ghana Land Registry recognized the church as legal in 1969.

By 1978, Johnson led the church in Ghana. He led seven congregations with somewhere between 500 and 1,000 total members. That same year, church president Spencer W. Kimball announced Official Declaration 2 which extended the priesthood to all worthy male members of the church regardless of race. In gratitude, Johnson sent a letter to Kimball, explaining that God had prepared the people in Ghana, and asked him to send missionaries to the members. Four months later, on September 27, 1978, the first official missionaries were called to serve in Ghana and Nigeria. Rendell N. Mabey and Rachel Mabey were the first assigned to the area; they joined Edwin Q. Cannon and Janath R. Cannon. Upon arrival, they were welcomed by excited congregation members who had been waiting many years. They fixed the registry documentation that did not coincide with church policy and resubmitted the paperwork. It was accepted and the church was established. They baptized and confirmed 125 people in a secluded part of the ocean on December 9, 1978. The first to be baptized was Mensah, the second was Johnson, and the 20th was one Ebenezer Crankson whose son is Charles Vroom Crankson (who first became known when the LDS Church's Liahona Magazine published his BYU–Pathway Worldwide success story). Anticipating the arrival of the missionaries, members had raised money to build new churches for worship. The missionaries organized congregations and set up new leadership for them. They ordained Johnson as a priest and called him to be the first branch president, also calling Naomi Ogoe as the first Relief Society president. In just four days, the missionaries had baptized 249 people and organized two branches. From this point on, the congregations in Ghana were part of the official church, which is headquartered in Salt Lake City, Utah.

By the end of 1979, there were 1,723 members of the church. This rapid growth made some nervous, as there were many members, but not experienced leaders. Ghana's government was also becoming increasingly unstable. Missionaries were temporarily expelled in 1979 because of this concern. A few things needed to be changed, as the membership in Ghana began without any official handbooks. These changes included removing women who were leading congregations, like Rebecca Mould, who members called "the Mormon Prophetess." Sacrament meetings that included dancing, drums, and clapping also ceased. The changes upset some Ghanaian members, who stopped going to church. New material was created as Priscilla Sampson-Davis translated the Book of Mormon and hymnbook into Fante for the church.

In March 1980, the Africa West Mission was organized. Bryan A. Espenschied was the first president to serve, along with his wife, LaNore Espenschied. Emmanuel A. Kissi, who had been previously baptized in Manchester, England headed leadership in Accra, soon becoming district president. The first Ghanaians to serve full-time missions were Isaac Nortey Dadzie and Leon Deguenon. In 1983, David B. Haight became the church's first apostle to visit Ghana. In 1985, Ghana was made into its own mission, previously headquartered in Nigeria.

== "The Freeze" ==
In the mid 1980s, Ghana was seeking political stability through their leader, Jerry J. Rawlings. He believed Ghana was too dependent on the West. An increased fear of American CIA operatives heightened tensions and caused worries about "the Mormons", as well as other foreign organizations like the Peace Corps and the International Catholic Youth Federation. Local chapters of the Presbyterian church had decreased numbers of confirmations and infant baptisms, and felt the LDS Church was to blame. Unease came from the affluence of the missionaries because they drove cars, and the church bought many properties. A damaging film created by former church member, Ed Decker, began showing on Ghana's public programming. His film, The God Makers, connected the religion with paganism and the occult, and was even shown at a special event for state officials. Others were upset, because they perceived the church was indoctrinating members to accept their poverty and oppression instead of finding solutions within political and economic spheres. Articles from the time show anger at the missionaries, who were thought to be colonizing the country with their religion, using it as a front for interest in Ghana's natural resources. Questions about the church's teachings began causing worry, particularly the idea that blacks were cursed and inferior. Some believed the 1978 announcement that allowed black male church members to hold the priesthood was just trying to erase the resentment, instead of change church policy. On June 14, 1989, the LDS Church was called to stop functioning in Ghana. Other churches, such as the Jehovah's Witnesses were also stopped. The official reason given for the freeze on church activity was that, despite warnings, the church was conducting itself in a way that undermined the state of Ghana and was not conducive to public order.

Amidst the discontent, church member and prominent schoolteacher, Stephen Abu, was called to step down from his position teaching at a Presbyterian middle school. When the request was not complied to, those that opposed the church began praying to God to bring death to Abu and his brother, Kissi. Police officers took control of the church meetinghouse, looking for evidence that the LDS Church was against the state of Ghana. They also seized the church-owned farmland and auctioned off their chickens. Abu was brought to trial, where he was charged with continuing to worship, despite the government asking him to cease, and having links with Americans with whom he illegally sold diamonds and gold at the Accra Airport. After a search warrant at his home, nothing of interest was found and he was released on bail. Abu was ordered to come to the police station every morning, and during one visit, was asked to pay 25,000 cedis ($76) for his freedom, leaving him with 5,000 cedis ($15) to feed his family of nine. Another member, Joseph Kwamena Otoo, was thrown into prison 16 times because of his associations with the church. Otoo's head was shaven, and his home searched for material that was anti-revolutionary. Soldiers warned him that members seen going into the church building would be killed. After suffering much persecution, he was pardoned by the commanding officer. Other members were imprisoned after being caught worshiping in a home. Guards asked the men to preach to them, with the intent to ridicule. They taught the officers about Joseph Smith and were let out the next morning.

During this time, the church functioned very differently in Ghana. Foreign missionaries had to quickly withdraw from the country, including the acting mission president. To make it through the angry crowds, the church's name was rubbed off vehicles. Kissi was called as the acting president of the Ghana Accra Mission. Members held sacrament meetings in homes on a family basis, instead of at formal meetinghouses. While there, groups would share talks, sing, and study the scriptures. Those who had an ecclesiastical calling kept the leadership position throughout the Freeze. However, instead of members congregating, the branch presidents would visit families individually. Johnson and his wife were the only missionaries at the time. The payment of tithing ceased, as it was considered a crime.

Government officials started warming up to the religion after a series of interactions with LDS Church officials who dispelled false rumors on doctrine and offered to donate some of the property they owned to the state. On November 30, 1990, after a period of 18 months, the Freeze was lifted and the church was allowed to continue functioning as it had before. The government became convinced the Latter-day Saints were loyal citizens when they submitted to the laws during the Freeze. Interestingly, church membership grew after the Freeze, possibly because of the increased media attention.

== 1990–present ==
On April 21, 1991, the first two stakes were organized in Ghana. Boyd K. Packer organized one in Accra with Emmanuel Ohene-Opare as stake president. The other was organized by James E. Faust in Cape Coast with Kweku Prah Ghartey as president. Following this, the first African mission president, Christopher N. Chukwurah, was called. From 1991 to 2007, the Ghana Mission covered Sierra Leone and Liberia. The church put effort into building meetinghouses to support the growing number of members. In 1992, there were four meetinghouses, and by the end of 1999 there were 229. Membership grew rapidly, with 8,970 members in 1990, up to 22,164 by 2002. In 1998, Emmanuel Ohene-Opare was the first Ghanaian to be called an Area Authority. In 2002, a Missionary Training Center (MTC) was built in Tema, Ghana; this was the first MTC in Africa. In 2005, Ghana grew into two missions, with a new mission based in Cape Coast also covering French-speaking Togo, Benin, Cameroon and Central African Republic. The same year, the Book of Mormon was translated into Twi, the most widely spoken native language in Ghana.

In 1993, church president Gordon B. Hinckley visited Ghana for the first time and announced a new temple. He visited again in 1998 to find the property upon which the temple would be built. In preparation, the temple ordinances were translated and recorded into the Twi and Fante languages. Construction began with a groundbreaking ceremony held on November 16, 2001, with Russell M. Nelson presiding. The vice-president of the Republic of Ghana, Aliu Mahama, was also present. Nelson also met with the President of the Republic of Ghana, John Kufuor during his visit. The Accra Ghana Temple was dedicated in 2004. It is Ghana's only temple and became the church's 117th working temple. As of 2019, there are four operating missions in Ghana: Accra, Accra West, Cape Coast, and Kumasi.

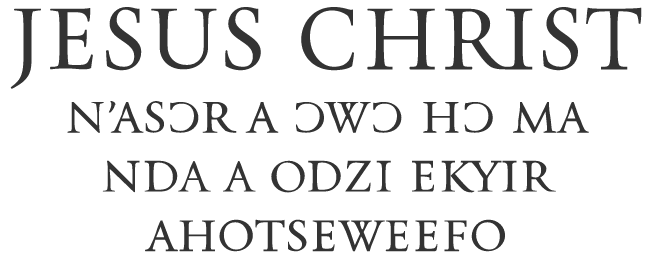
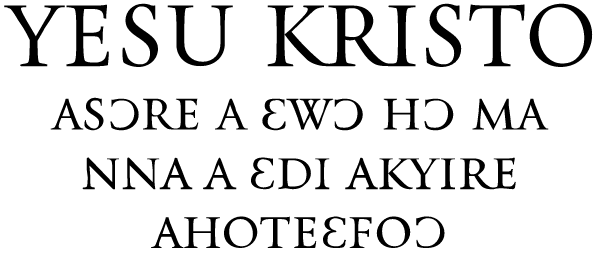
Logo of The Church of Jesus Christ of Latter-day Saints in the indigenous languages of Fante (above) and Twi(below).

The LDS Church has an extensive humanitarian program in Ghana. The projects have included drilling wells, building schools, working in orphanages, and distributing wheelchairs. They have also built health clinics and provided computers. Local members have organized projects painting streets and buildings. They have donated books to local schools and aided in clean water projects. The church's Benson Institute teaches self-sufficiency skills to families. From 1986 to 2001, 142 projects were sponsored valued at 7.5 million dollars (U.S.).

In 2018, the LDS Church reported having 78,065 members, along with 4 missions, 51 family history centers, and 303 congregations in Ghana.

About two-thirds of heads of households in Ghana are literate in English, and English is spoken in most congregations, especially in urban areas. Despite this, the church's general conferences are translated into the Fante and Twi languages, indigenous to Ghana. Certain church materials such as the Book of Mormon have also been translated into these languages.

== Stakes and districts ==
As of July 2026, Ghana had the following stakes and districts:

Stake/District	Organized	Mission
Abomosu Ghana Stake	22 Oct 2017	Ghana Accra West
Abura Ghana Stake	18 Apr 2021	Ghana Cape Coast
Accra Ghana Adenta Stake	21 Apr 1991	Ghana Accra North
Accra Ghana Christiansborg Stake	9 Nov 1997	Ghana Accra East
Accra Ghana Kaneshie Stake	22 Apr 2012	Ghana Accra South
Accra Ghana Kasoa Stake	17 Jun 2007	Ghana Accra South
Accra Ghana Lartebiokorshie Stake	25 Oct 2015	Ghana Accra South
Accra Ghana Madina Stake	21 Jan 2018	Ghana Accra East
Accra Ghana Ofankor Stake	8 Nov 2015	Ghana Accra West
Accra Ghana Tesano Stake	22 Apr 2012	Ghana Accra East
Asamankese Ghana Stake	10 Dec 2017	Ghana Accra West
Ashaiman Ghana Stake	9 Nov 2014	Ghana Accra East
Ashaiman Ghana Bethlehem Stake	4 Jul 2021	Ghana Accra North
Assin Foso Ghana Stake	6 Mar 2011	Ghana Cape Coast
Assin Foso Ghana South Stake	9 Sep 2018	Ghana Cape Coast
Axim Ghana District	21 Apr 2019	Ghana Takoradi
Bibiani Ghana District	10 Jun 2018	Ghana Kumasi
Cape Coast Ghana Stake	21 Apr 1991	Ghana Cape Coast
Dzodze Ghana District	18 Jun 2023	Ghana Accra North
Ejisu Ghana Stake	17 Mar 2024	Ghana Kumasi
Ho Ghana District	14 Sep 2014	Ghana Accra North
Koforidua Ghana Stake	25 Jun 2017	Ghana Accra West
Kpong Ghana Stake	12 Jul 2026	Ghana Accra North
Kumasi Ghana Bantama Stake	22 Nov 1998	Ghana Kumasi
Kumasi Ghana Dichemso Stake	15 Dec 2013	Ghana Kumasi
Kumasi Ghana Konongo Stake	26 Sep 2021	Ghana Kumasi
Kumasi Ghana Suame Stake	13 Sep 2020	Ghana Kumasi
Kumasi Ghana University Stake	6 Nov 2016	Ghana Kumasi
Mankessim Ghana District	16 Nov 2025	Ghana Cape Coast
Mpintsin Ghana Stake	20 Mar 2016	Ghana Takoradi
Obuasi Ghana District	22 Dec 2013	Ghana Kumasi
Oda Ghana District	1 Dec 2024	Ghana Accra West
Sofokrom Ghana Stake	3 Mar 2024	Ghana Takoradi
Sunyani Ghana District	6 May 2012	Ghana Sunyani
Swedru Ghana Stake	12 Aug 2018	Ghana Accra South
Takoradi Ghana Stake	18 May 1997	Ghana Takoradi
Tamale Ghana District	31 May 2015	Ghana Sunyani
Tarkwa Ghana District	30 Oct 2016	Ghana Takoradi
Techiman Ghana District	27 Nov 2022	Ghana Sunyani
Tema Ghana Stake	23 Apr 2006	Ghana Accra East
Teshie Ghana Stake	23 Apr 2017	Ghana Accra East
Twifu Praso Ghana District	4 Aug 2013	Ghana Cape Coast
Winneba Ghana Stake	11 Aug 2019	Ghana Accra South
Yamoransa Ghana Stake	22 May 2016	Ghana Cape Coast

== Missions ==
Ghana is home to one of the church's 10 MTCs, which are facilities for training missionaries for a period between 3 and 12 weeks before they go out into the field. The Ghana MTC is one of two in Africa but serves much of Africa because of its high capacity compared to the smallest MTC in the world, located in South Africa. The Ghana MTC in Tema was the first to be built in Africa and was dedicated on May 17, 2002. At that time, the Ghana MTC could accommodate only 90 missionaries. Because of rapid church growth in Africa, in August 2017, the MTC was replaced with a bigger facility that could accommodate up to 500 missionaries and is located next to the Accra Ghana Temple. In addition to the MTC, Ghana has six missions within its boundaries. Namely:

Mission	Organized
Ghana Accra Mission	1 Jul 1985
Ghana Accra North Mission	30 Jun 2024
Ghana Accra West Mission	1 Jul 2013
Ghana Cape Coast Mission	1 Jul 2005
Ghana Kumasi Mission	30 Jun 2012
Ghana Sunyani Mission	1 Jul 2026
Ghana Takoradi Mission	30 Jun 2024

== Temples ==
Temples in Ghana
Red = Operating
Blue = Under Construction
Yellow = announced
Black = Closed for Renovations

On January 11, 2004, the Accra Ghana Temple was dedicated by church president Gordon B. Hinckley. The intent to build the Kumasi Ghana Temple was announced on April 4, 2021, by church president Russell M. Nelson.

117. Accra Ghana Temple; Official website; News & images	
Location: Announced: Groundbreaking: Dedicated: Size: Style:	Accra, Ghana; 16 February 1998 by Gordon B. Hinckley; 16 November 2001 by Russell M. Nelson; 11 January 2004 by Gordon B. Hinckley; 17,500 sq ft (1,630 m^{2}) on a 6-acre (2.4 ha) site Classic modern, single-spire design - designed by ARUP
271. Kumasi Ghana Temple (Under construction); Official website; News & images	
Location: Announced: Groundbreaking: Size:	Kumasi, Ghana; 4 April 2021 by Russell M. Nelson; 18 October 2025 by Isaac K. Morrison; 22,750 sq ft (2,114 m^{2}) on a 2.08-acre (0.84 ha) site
331. Cape Coast Ghana Temple (Announced); Official website; News & images	
Location: Announced:	Cape Coast, Ghana; 1 October 2023 by Russell M. Nelson

== See also ==
- Accra Ghana Temple
- Billy Johnson (Mormon)
- The Church of Jesus Christ of Latter-day Saints membership statistics
- Religion in Ghana
- Christianity in Ghana
