= The Church of Jesus Christ of Latter-day Saints in Nigeria =

- Area: Africa West
- Members: 274,043 (2025)
- Stakes: 80
- Districts: 13
- Wards: 569
- Branches: 311
- Total congregations: 880
- Missions: 11
- Temples: 1 operating; 2 under construction; 4 announced; 7 total
- FamilySearch Centers: 153

The Church of Jesus Christ of Latter-day Saints in Nigeria refers to The Church of Jesus Christ of Latter-day Saints (LDS Church) and its members in Nigeria. At year-end 1983, there were 2,255 members in Nigeria. In 2025, there were 274,043 members in 880 congregations making it the largest body of LDS Church members in Africa.

== History ==
Membership in Nigeria
Year	Membership
1983	2,255
1985	5,500
1989	12,000
1995	28,000
1999	42,746
2004	68,777
2009	88,374
2014	129,989
2019	192,144
2024	250,341
2025	274,043
*Membership was published as a rounded number.

In the 1950s and 1960s, several thousand native Nigerians became interested in joining the LDS Church, despite the church having no formal presence in the country. In November 1962, LeMar Williams was set apart as a mission president in Nigeria. However, he was not able to get a visa as an American. N. Eldon Tanner, a Canadian, went to Nigeria and began negotiations with the Nigerian government. While he was there, he dedicated Nigeria for the preaching of the gospel. Ambrose Chukwuo, a Nigerian college student studying in California, read Mormonism and the Negro and sent a letter to a Nigerian newspaper condemning the LDS Church's teachings on blacks. The newspaper published Chukwuo's letter and the letters of other students with similar opinions. The Nigerian government did not give the LDS Church a permit to proselyte and church president David O. McKay postponed proselyting plans. In 1965, Williams obtained a visa to go to Nigeria and began preparing to set up a mission in Nigeria. Since black Nigerians couldn't hold the priesthood, Williams was going to baptize those who were ready and set up auxiliary organizations that could function without the priesthood. Black Nigerians would be allowed to pass, but not bless the sacrament. However, several members of the Quorum of the Twelve Apostles expressed concern about teaching black people and called for the program to be terminated. After a unanimous vote, they decided to end the program. They contacted Williams and told him to leave Nigeria immediately. The Biafran war in 1967 further postponed church work there.

With the 1978 Revelation on Priesthood, plans were again begun to start the church in Nigeria. Ted Cannon and his wife, Janath, along with Rendell N. Mabey and his wife, Rachel, were sent to Nigeria, arriving in November 1978, five months after the revelation. They based their operations out of Enugu, and the first branch they organized was with Anthony Obinna as president. Most of the earliest converts they baptized were in various villages throughout south-eastern Nigeria and had been meeting and seeking church membership for years, if not decades.

At first Nigeria was administered by the church's International Mission. In 1983 a Nigerian, mission was organized, which originally also covered Ghana.

In 1988, the church's first stake in Nigeria was organized in Aba, with David W. Eka as president. In 1993, the second stake in Nigeria was organized in Benin City.

In 1998, Gordon B. Hinckley became the first church president to visit Nigeria, presiding at a large meeting in Port Harcourt. In 2000, Hinckley announced plans to build a temple in Aba. The temple was dedicated by Hinckley in 2005. In 2009, the temple was closed as foreign temple worker missionaries were withdrawn due to violence in the area. The temple was reopened in 2010 with a Nigerian as temple president and all temple workers being Nigerian.

By 2018, there were over 50 stakes in Nigeria. In that year church president Russell M. Nelson announced plans to build a temple in Lagos, Nigeria. The first stake in Lagos had been organized in 1995, and in 2015 it had gone from 3 to 5 stakes. The LDS Church was still most heavily concentrated in south-east Nigeria, with Akwa Ibom State alone having 12 stakes.

Much of northern Nigeria had no LDS Church presence and many areas in mid-Nigeria had only begun to have significant organizational presence of the church in the mid-2010s.

By mid-2019 there were 58 stakes in Nigeria, with the 58th stake being the 3rd based in the capital city of Abuja. The Abuja stakes were far and away the most northern in Nigeria, with the district in Jos containing the only other units of the church even close to that far north. The growth had in some places been very fast, with Yorubaland (not including heavily Yoruba Lagos State) having gone from no stakes in 2013 to 5 by 2019.

Other states that saw significant growth were Delta State, that went from a few branches in a district outside the state in 2015 to three districts and a stake in 2019. Benue State in the more central area of the country had one branch in 2015, and did not get a district until 2017. By 2019 the state had 3 districts.

== Stakes and districts ==
Stake/District	Organized	Mission
Aba Nigeria North Stake	15 May 1988	Nigeria Aba
Aba Nigeria Ogbor Hill Stake	3 Dec 2006	Nigeria Aba
Aba Nigeria Osisioma Stake	15 May 2022	Nigeria Aba
Aba Nigeria South Stake	6 Dec 2015	Nigeria Aba
Aba Nigeria Umuola Stake	10 Jun 2018	Nigeria Aba
Abak Nigeria Stake	14 Jun 2015	Nigeria Aba
Abakaliki Nigeria Stake	28 Oct 2018	Nigeria Enugu
Abeokuta Nigeria Obantoko Stake	20 Sep 2026	Nigeria Ibadan
Abeokuta Nigeria Oke-Ata Stake	2 Sep 2018	Nigeria Ibadan
Abeokuta Nigeria Oke-Ilewo Stake	16 Nov 2014	Nigeria Ibadan
Abuja Nigeria Karu Stake	2 Feb 2025	Nigeria Abuja
Abuja Nigeria Kubwa Stake	29 May 2016	Nigeria Abuja
Abuja Nigeria Lugbe Stake	24 Jun 2012	Nigeria Abuja
Abuja Nigeria Wuse Stake	23 Jun 2019	Nigeria Abuja
Agbor Nigeria District	24 Nov 2013	Nigeria Owerri
Akamkpa Nigeria Stake	12 Jun 2022	Nigeria Calabar
Akure Nigeria Stake	22 Sep 2024	Nigeria Ibadan
Asaba Nigeria Stake	10 Jun 2018	Nigeria Owerri
Awka Nigeria Stake	24 Nov 2019	Nigeria Owerri
Azikoro Nigeria District	3 Nov 2024	Nigeria Port Harcourt North
Benin City Nigeria Ihogbe Stake	24 Oct 1993	Nigeria Benin City
Benin City Nigeria Ikpokpan Stake	2 Mar 1997	Nigeria Benin City
Benin City Nigeria New Benin Stake	2 Sep 2007	Nigeria Benin City
Benin City Nigeria Oregbeni Stake	20 Sep 2015	Nigeria Benin City
Benin City Nigeria Siluko Stake	11 Mar 2012	Nigeria Benin City
Benin City Nigeria Sokponba Stake	18 Feb 2018	Nigeria Benin City
Benin City Nigeria Ugbowo Stake	11 Mar 2012	Nigeria Benin City
Benin City Nigeria Uzebu Stake	18 Feb 2018	Nigeria Benin City
Bori Nigeria District	18 Aug 2019	Nigeria Port Harcourt South
Calabar Nigeria Etta Agbor Stake	18 Aug 2024	Nigeria Calabar
Calabar Nigeria South Stake	17 May 2015	Nigeria Calabar
Calabar Nigeria Stake	1 Dec 2002	Nigeria Calabar
Calabar Nigeria Tinapa Stake	3 Dec 2017	Nigeria Calabar
Eket Nigeria Stake	14 Jul 1996	Nigeria Uyo
Ekete Nigeria Stake	29 Nov 2020	Nigeria Benin City
Ekpoma Nigeria Stake	14 Jan 2018	Nigeria Benin City
Enugu Nigeria North Stake	5 Jul 2026	Nigeria Enugu
Enugu Nigeria South Stake	29 Jun 2014	Nigeria Enugu
Etinan Nigeria North Stake	15 Oct 2017	Nigeria Uyo
Etinan Nigeria Stake	22 Sep 1996	Nigeria Uyo
Gboko Nigeria Stake	9 Mar 2025	Nigeria Enugu
Ibadan Nigeria North Stake	24 Mar 2019	Nigeria Ibadan
Ibadan Nigeria Stake	15 Jun 2014	Nigeria Ibadan
Ibesikpo Nigeria Stake	1 May 2016	Nigeria Uyo
Ibiono Nigeria Stake	4 Dec 2016	Nigeria Uyo
Ifo Nigeria District	12 May 2024	Nigeria Ibadan
Ijebu-Ode Nigeria Stake	30 May 2021	Nigeria Ibadan
Ikot Akpaden Nigeria Stake	27 Jun 1999	Nigeria Port Harcourt South
Ikot Akpatek Nigeria Stake	5 Jun 2016	Nigeria Port Harcourt South
Ikot Ekpene Nigeria Stake	15 May 2016	Nigeria Aba
Ikot Use Ekong Nigeria Stake	8 Feb 2026	Nigeria Uyo
Ile-Ife Nigeria Stake	26 Jun 2016	Nigeria Ibadan
Iyahe Nigeria District	10 Nov 2024	Nigeria Enugu
Jos Nigeria Stake	22 Sep 2024	Nigeria Abuja
Lagos Nigeria Agege Stake	20 Feb 2005	Nigeria Lagos
Lagos Nigeria Egbeda Stake	22 Nov 2015	Nigeria Lagos
Lagos Nigeria Festac Stake	22 Nov 2015	Nigeria Lagos
Lagos Nigeria Gberigbe Stake	31 May 2026	Nigeria Lagos
Lagos Nigeria Ikeja Stake	23 Feb 1997	Nigeria Lagos
Lagos Nigeria Ikorodu Stake	19 Jun 2022	Nigeria Lagos
Lagos Nigeria Ikotun Stake	26 Jun 2022	Nigeria Lagos
Lagos Nigeria Ojodu Stake	24 Jun 2018	Nigeria Lagos
Lagos Nigeria Yaba Stake	15 May 2011	Nigeria Lagos
Lekki Nigeria Stake	20 Oct 2024	Nigeria Lagos
Makurdi Nigeria Stake	15 Dec 2024	Nigeria Enugu
Mangu Nigeria District	8 Mar 2026	Nigeria Abuja
Mbaise Nigeria Stake	13 Mar 2022	Nigeria Owerri
Nsit Ubium Nigeria Stake	16 Jul 2023	Nigeria Uyo
Nsukka Nigeria Stake	24 May 2026	Nigeria Enugu
Nsukwa Nigeria District	31 Mar 2019	Nigeria Owerri
Ogbomosho Nigeria District	15 Jul 2018	Nigeria Ibadan
Ogwashi Nigeria District	24 Nov 2013	Nigeria Owerri
Ohafia Nigeria Stake	29 May 2022	Nigeria Enugu
Okpuala Ngwa Nigeria Stake	13 Sep 2015	Nigeria Aba
Okrika Nigeria District	6 Dec 2009	Nigeria Port Harcourt South
Ondo Nigeria Stake	26 Nov 2023	Nigeria Ibadan
Onitsha Nigeria Stake	19 Jun 2016	Nigeria Owerri
Onna Nigeria Stake	17 Mar 2024	Nigeria Port Harcourt South
Oron Nigeria District	8 Mar 2009	Nigeria Uyo
Osogbo Nigeria Stake	21 Oct 2026	Nigeria Ibadan
Otukpo Nigeria District	16 Jul 2017	Nigeria Enugu
Owerri Nigeria North Stake	27 Jan 2019	Nigeria Owerri
Owerri Nigeria Stake	14 Jun 1998	Nigeria Owerri
Port Harcourt Nigeria Central Stake	5 Sep 2021	Nigeria Port Harcourt South
Port Harcourt Nigeria Choba Stake	8 Jul 2018	Nigeria Port Harcourt North
Port Harcourt Nigeria East Stake	13 Nov 2011	Nigeria Port Harcourt North
Port Harcourt Nigeria Emuoha Stake	15 Sep 2024	Nigeria Port Harcourt North
Port Harcourt Nigeria North Stake	27 Nov 2016	Nigeria Port Harcourt North
Port Harcourt Nigeria South Stake	27 Nov 2016	Nigeria Port Harcourt South
Port Harcourt Nigeria Stake	25 Nov 1990	Nigeria Port Harcourt South
Port Harcourt Nigeria West Stake	6 Jul 2003	Nigeria Port Harcourt North
Ugep Nigeria District	10 Apr 2022	Nigeria Enugu
Ukat Aran Nigeria Stake	19 Sep 1999	Nigeria Uyo
Umuahia Nigeria South Stake	12 May 2019	Nigeria Owerri
Umuahia Nigeria Stake	18 May 2014	Nigeria Owerri
Uyo Nigeria Central Stake	20 Aug 2023	Nigeria Uyo
Uyo Nigeria Stake	9 Dec 2001	Nigeria Uyo
Warri Nigeria Stake	7 Jul 2013	Nigeria Benin City
Yenagoa Nigeria Stake	14 May 2017	Nigeria Port Harcourt North

== Missions ==
The LDS Church announced creation of new Owerri mission in Nigeria in 2016. The Nigeria Aba and Nigeria Abuja missions were created in July 2023 bringing the total number of missions in Nigeria to nine.

Mission	Organized
Nigeria Aba Mission	1 Jul 2023
Nigeria Abuja Mission	1 Jul 2023
Nigeria Benin City Mission	1 Jul 2013
Nigeria Calabar Mission	Jun 2024
Nigeria Enugu Mission	1 Jul 1992
Nigeria Ibadan Mission	1 Jul 1992
Nigeria Lagos Mission	1 Jul 1980
Nigeria Owerri Mission	1 Jul 2016
Nigeria Port Harcourt North Mission	Jun 2024
Nigeria Port Harcourt South Mission	1 Jul 1988
Nigeria Uyo Mission	1 Jul 2002

== Temples ==
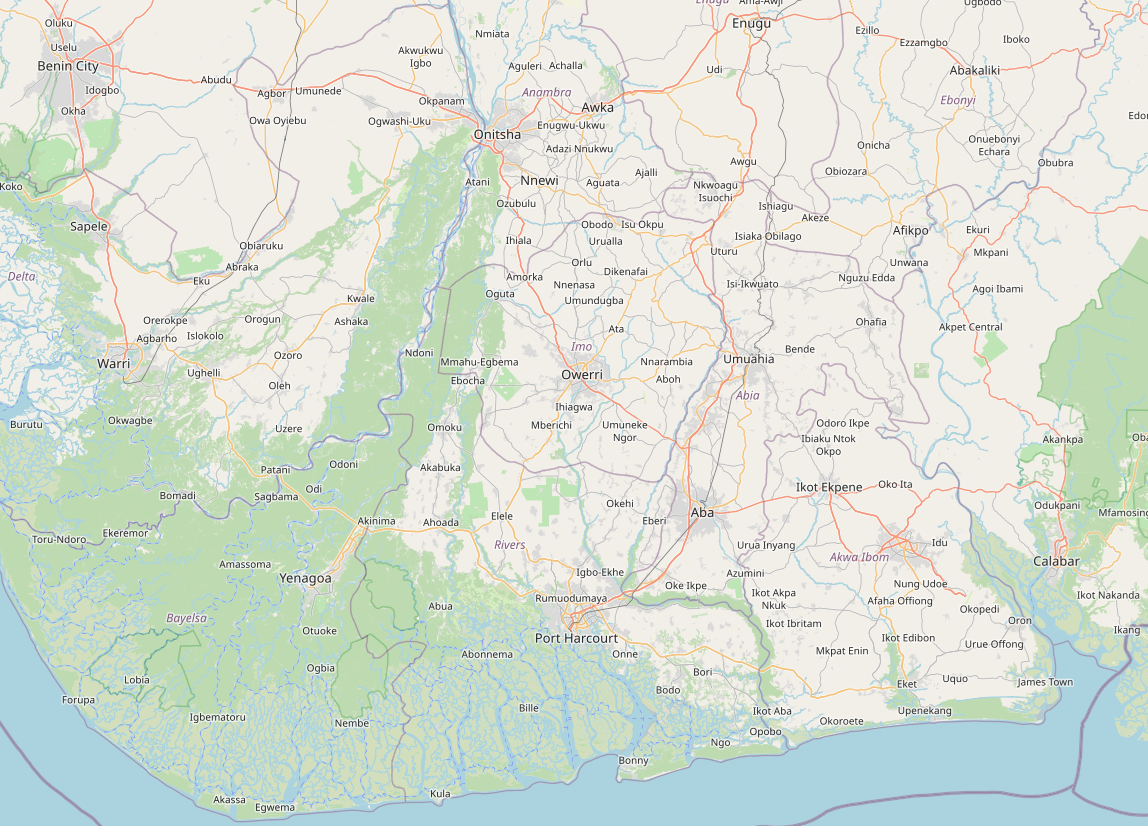

Temples in Nigeria

- = Operating
- = Under construction
- = Announced
- = Temporarily Closed

Nigeria currently has 1 operating temple, 2 under construction, and 4 other prospective temples that have been announced.

121. Aba Nigeria Temple; Official website; News & images	
Location: Announced: Groundbreaking: Dedicated: Size: Style:	Aba, Abia, Nigeria; 2 April 2000 by Gordon B. Hinckley; 23 February 2002 by H. Bruce Stucki; 7 August 2005 by Gordon B. Hinckley; 11,500 sq ft (1,070 m^{2}) on a 6.3-acre (2.5 ha) site Classic modern, single-spire design - designed by Adeniyi Coker Consultants Limited
259. Lagos Nigeria Temple (Under construction); Official website; News & images	
Location: Announced: Groundbreaking: Size:	Ikoyi, Lagos, Nigeria; 7 October 2018 by Russell M. Nelson; 10 May 2025 by Alfred Kyungu; 19,800 sq ft (1,840 m^{2}) on a 2.7-acre (1.1 ha) site
261. Benin City Nigeria Temple (Under construction); Official website; News & images	
Location: Announced: Groundbreaking: Size:	Benin City, Nigeria; 5 April 2020 by Russell M. Nelson; 24 May 2025 by Adeyinka A. Ojediran; 30,700 sq ft (2,850 m^{2}) on a 2.17-acre (0.88 ha) site
296. Eket Nigeria Temple (Groundbreaking scheduled); Official website; News & images	
Location: Announced: Groundbreaking: Size:	Eket, Nigeria; 2 October 2022 by Russell M. Nelson scheduled for 28 November 2026 by D. Martin Goury; 18,850 sq ft (1,751 m^{2}) on a 7-acre (2.8 ha) site
297. Calabar Nigeria Temple (Groundbreaking scheduled); Official website; News & images	
Location: Announced: Groundbreaking: Size:	Calabar, Nigeria; 1 October 2023 by Russell M. Nelson scheduled for 5 December 2026 by Christian C. Chigbundu; 26,000 sq ft (2,400 m^{2}) on a 7-acre (2.8 ha) site
360. Abuja Nigeria Temple (Announced); Official website; News & images	
Location: Announced:	Abuja, Nigeria; 6 October 2024 by Russell M. Nelson
373. Uyo Nigeria Temple (Announced); Official website; News & images	
Location: Announced:	Uyo, Nigeria; 6 April 2025 by Russell M. Nelson

== See also ==
- Religion in Nigeria
- Christianity in Nigeria
