= The Church of Jesus Christ of Latter-day Saints in Norway =

- (Logo in Norwegian)

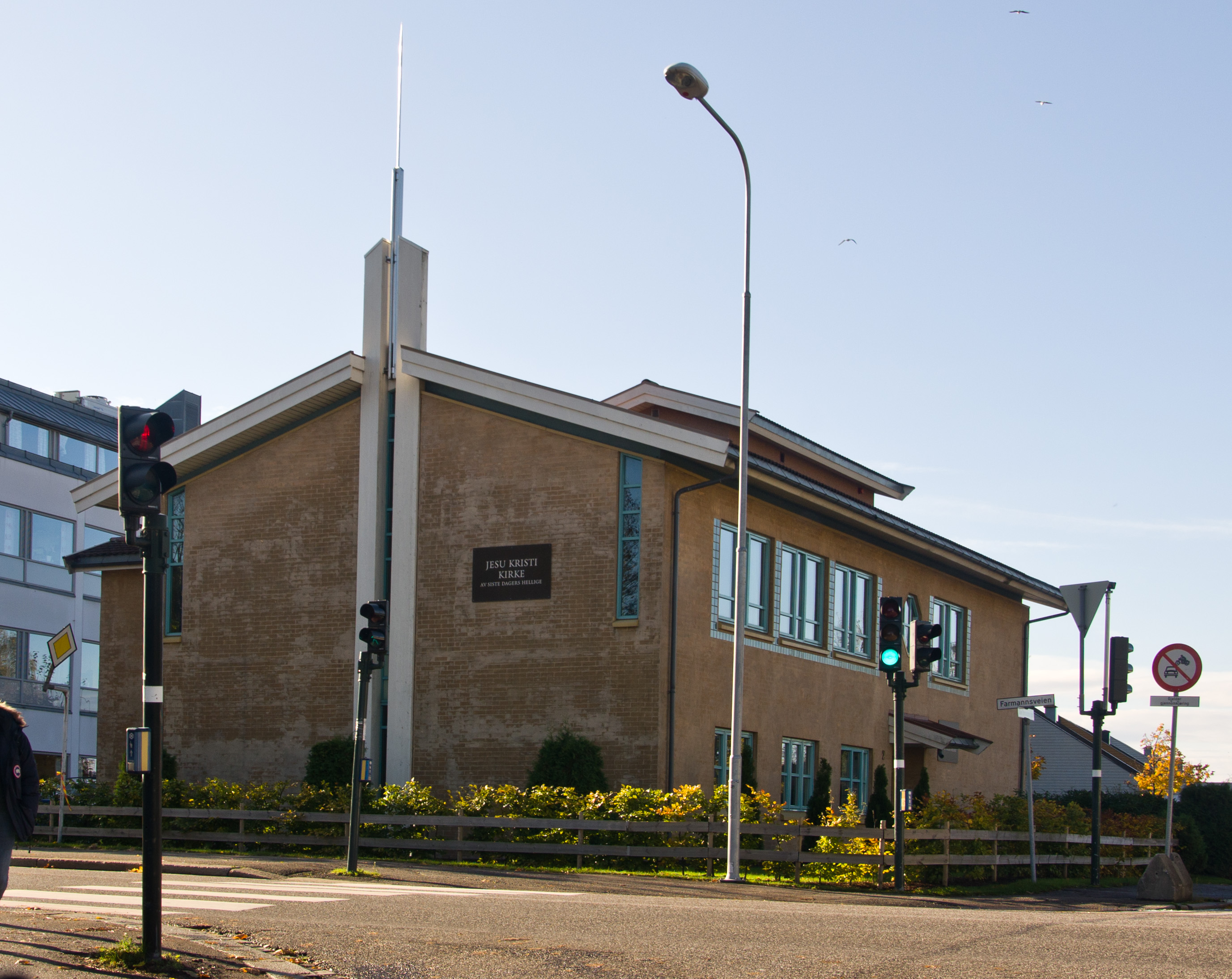
- A meetinghouse for The Church of Jesus Christ of Latter-day Saints in Tønsberg
- Area: Europe North
- Members: 4,547 (2025)
- Stakes: 2
- Wards: 10
- Branches: 9
- Total congregations: 19
- Missions: 1
- Temples: 1 announced
- FamilySearch Centers: 16

The Church of Jesus Christ of Latter-day Saints in Norway (Norwegian: Jesu Kristi kirke av siste dagers hellige) is a restorationist free church. There are more than 4,500 members in Norway. A temple to be built in Oslo was announced on April 4, 2021 by church president Russell M. Nelson.

== History ==
Membership in Norway
Year	Members
1930	1,507
1940	1,643
1950	1,515
1960	1,907
1970	2,885
1980	3,888
1989*	3,700
1999	4,120
2009	4,164
2019	4,564
2025	4,547
*Membership was published as an estimate or rounded number. Source: Windall J. Ashton; Jim M. Wall, Deseret News, various years, Church Almanac Country Information: Norway

The first Norwegians who joined the Church of Jesus Christ of Latter-day Saints (LDS Church) were emigrants from Norway, living in a colony on the Fox River in Illinois, America. In 1842, George Parker Dykes came to this Norwegian colony as a missionary sent from Nauvoo. In a short time, he established a Norwegian congregation, and soon thereafter brought the message of the restoration to other Norwegian settlements in Iowa and Wisconsin.

Knut Pedersen from Stavanger and Erik Hogan from Telemark were some of the many Norwegian members that migrated west to the Utah Territory after the death of church founder Joseph Smith. They were met in the mountains by a group heading east who had been called to open the Scandinavian Mission: Erastus Snow, the Swede John E. Forsgren, and the Dane Peter O. Hansen. George P. Dykes joined the group in England, and was particularly helpful because of his knowledge of Norwegian from his time at Fox River.

In the summer of 1850 they came to Copenhagen, which was a headquarters for the Scandinavian Mission until 1950. The Book of Mormon was translated into Danish in 1850 as the first language other than English; this formed a basis for the early missionary work in Norway, as the Bible and the Book of Mormon was used together in preaching.

The first baptism in Norway were in Risør on 26 November 1851, and in 1852 branches were organized in Risør, Brevik and Fredrikstad. Membership grew rapidly after these branches were organized, and new congregations were organized in major cities along the coast over the next 2–3 years. Controversy arose among Norwegian theologians as to whether members Mormons should be viewed as Christians; in November 1853, the Supreme Court of Norway ruled that its Dissenter Law of 1845, which protected the rights of Christian groups outside the established Church of Norway, did not apply to church members, and eleven of the church's missionaries, known as "Mormon preachers" were jailed. The Latter-Day Saint community repeatedly petitioned for the law to be changed, finally succeeding in 1882. In August 1946, the government granted the LDS Church permission to preach in Norway; official registration as a religious denomination was granted in 1988. As of 2024, with two stakes and 19 congregations, the church is firmly established in Norway.

The stigma of polygamy was a significant hindrance to proselytizing in Norway, and also meant that those who did convert had an additional incentive to emigrate.

The growth of the church within Norway was historically limited by continuing migration to the United States until after World War II. There was significant growth in the last half of the 20th century. Today there are over 4,500 members of the LDS Church in Norway, and membership is again increasing. A temple to be built in Oslo was announced on April 4, 2021, by church president Russell M. Nelson.

== Stakes and congregations ==
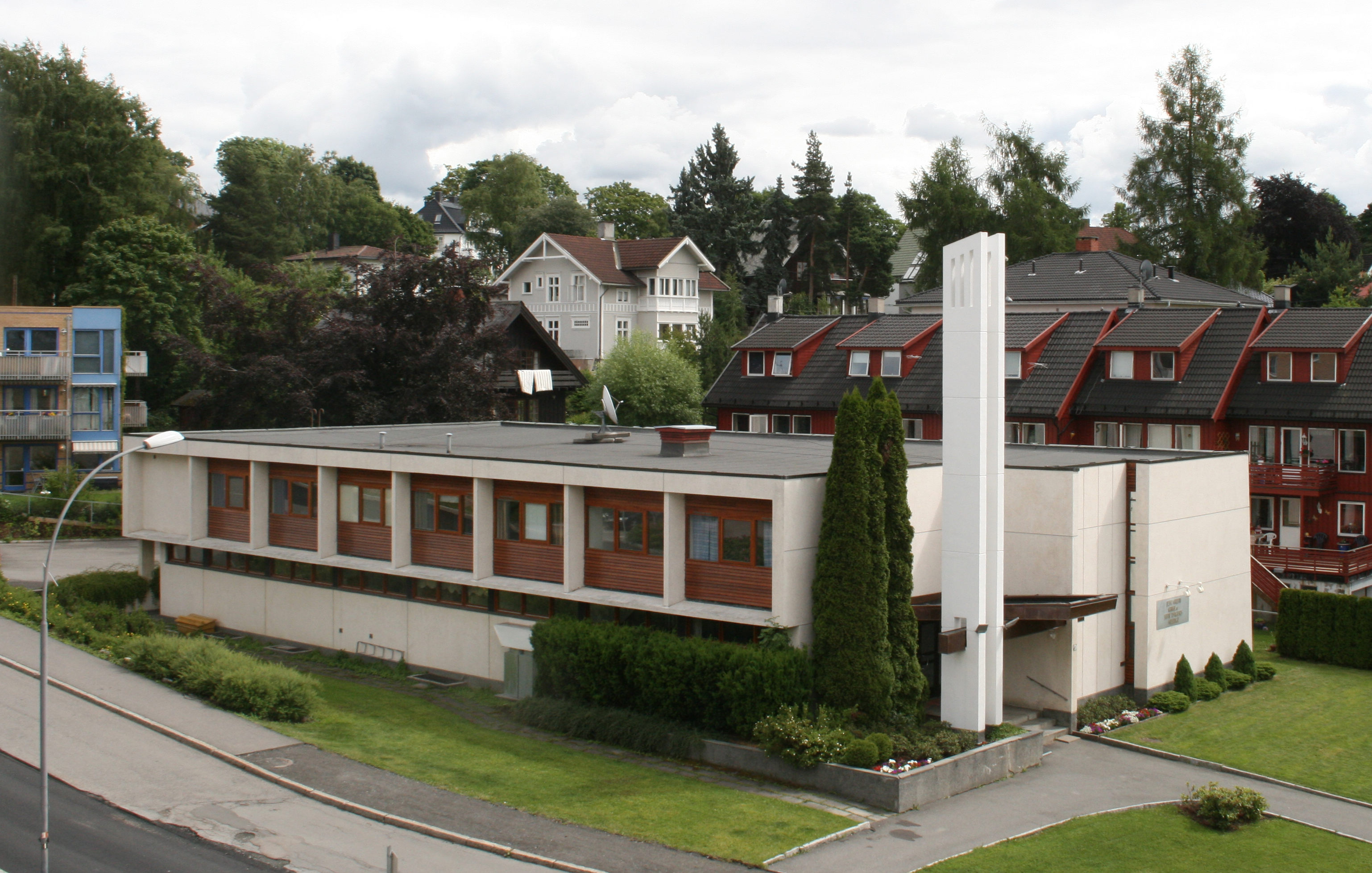
A LDS Church meetinghouse in Oslo

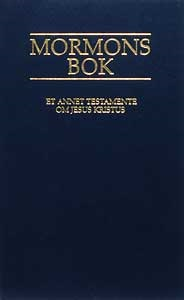
Book of Mormon in Norwegian, translated 1950

As of February 2023, the following congregations were located in Norway:

Drammen Norway Stake

- Arendal Branch
- Bergen Ward
- Drammen Ward
- Haugesund Branch
- Kristiansand Ward
- Skien Ward
- Stavanger Ward
- Tønsberg Branch

Oslo Norway Stake

- Alta-Hammerfest Branch
- Bodø Branch
- Fredrikstad Ward
- Hamar Branch
- Moss Ward
- Narvik-Harstad Branch
- Oslo Ward
- Romerike Ward
- Sandvika Ward
- Tromsø Branch
- Trondheim Ward

== Mission ==
- Norway Oslo Mission

== Temples ==
LDS Church members in Norway have travelled to worship for many years in the Stockholm Sweden Temple. On April 4, 2021, during general conference, church president Russell M. Nelson announced the first temple for Norway, to be built in Oslo. Until it is completed, members will continue to use those in the neighboring countries.

304. Oslo Norway Temple (Site announced); Official website; News & images	
Location: Announced: Size:	Hvalstad, Norway; 4 April 2021 by Russell M. Nelson; 10,800 sq ft (1,000 m^{2}) on a 8-acre (3.2 ha) site

== See also ==
- Christianity in Norway
