= Billy Johnson (Mormon) =

Ghanaian Mormon leader (1934–2012)

Joseph William Billy Johnson (17 December 1934 – 27 March 2012) was one of the first converts to the Church of Jesus Christ of Latter-day Saints (LDS Church) in Ghana, and was one of the first stake patriarchs in the country. Prior to his baptism, he had worked for many years to spread the doctrines of the LDS Church to many of his fellow countrymen. He was baptized six months after the 1978 Revelation on Priesthood and among the first to be baptized in the church in Ghana.

== Church leadership prior to baptism ==
Johnson was born in Lagos, Nigeria on 17 December 1934. He described his upbringing as Catholic and was a reverend in the Church of the Lord (Aladura). He also worked as an import officer for metal industries. In 1964, Johnson learned about the Book of Mormon from Frank A. Mensah. After receiving a copy of the Book of Mormon, Johnson and Mensah preached from the book and started "Latter-day Saint" congregations in Ghana, independent from any other Mormon sect. Mesnah delegated leadership of the Cape Coast congregation to Johnson, while he led the group in Accra and Rebecca Mould led a group in Sekondi-Takoradi. Their Brigham Young Educational Institute was a primary school in Bubiashie. Mesnah eventually left the congregations, leaving Johnson to lead them all. Johnson wrote a letter to church headquarters in 1964, asking them to send missionaries. David O. McKay told him they would not send missionaries yet, but that Johnson should wait patiently for the right time. Somewhere between 500 and 1,000 members attended Johnson's congregations. Johnson and his family lived off of his farm, his retirement pension, and donations from followers, but they were poor. Johnson resigned from his job in 1969 and preached full-time until 1979. Johnson's wife left him after he started preaching full-time.

Although he was not able to be baptized at the time, Johnson received support and encouragement in sharing the faith with others from Latter-day Saints who were expatriates that occasionally lived in or visited Ghana. This began primarily with Virginia Cutler, who was a visiting professor at the University of Ghana 1966–1969. Merrill J. Bateman also visited, along with M. Neff Smart, Edwin Q. "Ted" Cannon and Lynn M. Hilton. During these visits new literature was brought and members were encouraged to continue in faith. These visits all happened unofficially.

In 1976, Johnson set out to contact Latter-day Saints in Monrovia, Liberia and found the Reorganized Church of Jesus Christ of Latter Day Saints (RLDS Church). Johnson preached to them and 35 people converted. They did not have further contact. After sharing the message of Mormonism with many in Accra, Johnson moved to Cape Coast, Ghana, where he set up at least ten congregations there and in the surrounding areas. Some of the Cape Coast group of these independent congregations in Ghana formed the Apostolic Divine Church of Ghana, but this sect only lasted a few months. In 1977, four different denominations tried to persuade Johnson to have his congregations become part of their church, and offered him money to do so. Johnson declined their offers. The next year, LDS Church president Spencer W. Kimball announced Official Declaration 2 which extended the priesthood to all worthy male members of the church regardless of race or color. Johnson was overjoyed when he heard the news on a BBC radio broadcast. Kimball called missionaries Rendell N. Mabey and Rachel Mabey and sent them to Ghana. They joined Edwin Q. Cannon and Janath R. Cannon.

== Baptism and later religious service ==
Johnson was finally baptized into the LDS Church in November 1978. He was ordained as a priest and called to be the first branch president. He later served as the first district president. Many of Johnson's congregants were officially baptized into the LDS church, but about a third left.

In 1989, the Ghanaian government decided to suspend the activities of the church in the country. During this time, the church functioned very differently in Ghana. Foreign missionaries had to quickly withdraw from the country, including the acting mission president. Members held sacrament meetings in their homes on a family basis, instead of at formal meetinghouses. Johnson and his wife were called as the only missionaries at the time.

After the end of the freeze in November 1990, stakes were organized in Accra and Cape Coast. Johnson was called as the first stake patriarch in Ghana In 2004, the Accra Ghana Temple was completed, the LDS Church's second temple to be built in Africa. He died on 27 March 2012.

== See also ==
- The Church of Jesus Christ of Latter-day Saints in Ghana
