= James E. Faust =

American Latter-day Saint religious leader

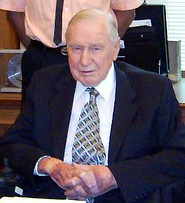

Second Counselor in the First Presidency
- March 12, 1995 – August 10, 2007
- Called by: Gordon B. Hinckley
- Predecessor: Thomas S. Monson
- Successor: Henry B. Eyring

Quorum of the Twelve Apostles
- September 30, 1978 – March 12, 1995
- Called by: Spencer W. Kimball
- End reason: Called as Second Counselor in the First Presidency

LDS Church Apostle
- October 1, 1978 – August 10, 2007
- Called by: Spencer W. Kimball
- Reason: Death of Delbert L. Stapley
- Reorganization at end of term: Quentin L. Cook ordained; Henry B. Eyring added to First Presidency

Presidency of the First Quorum of the Seventy
- October 1, 1976 – September 30, 1978
- Called by: Spencer W. Kimball
- End reason: Called to the Quorum of the Twelve Apostles

First Quorum of the Seventy
- October 1, 1976 – September 30, 1978
- Called by: Spencer W. Kimball
- End reason: Called to the Quorum of the Twelve Apostles

Assistant to the Quorum of the Twelve Apostles
- October 6, 1972 – October 1, 1976
- Called by: Harold B. Lee
- End reason: Position abolished

Personal details
- Born: James Esdras Faust; July 31, 1920; Delta, Utah, United States
- Died: August 10, 2007 (aged 87); Salt Lake City, Utah, United States
- Resting place: Holladay Memorial Park; 40.6622°N 111.8308°W
- Spouse(s): Ruth Wright
- Children: 5
- Signature
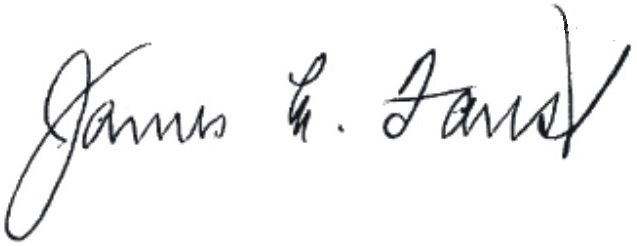

James Esdras Faust (July 31, 1920 – August 10, 2007) was an American religious leader, lawyer, and politician. Faust was Second Counselor in the First Presidency of the Church of Jesus Christ of Latter-day Saints (LDS Church) from 1995 until his death, an LDS Church apostle for 29 years, and a general authority of the church for 35 years.

== Early life ==
Faust was born to George A. Faust and Amy Finlinson in Delta, Utah. As a child, he lived in this area. His family moved to the southern part of the Salt Lake Valley before he reached high school age. He attended Granite High School in Salt Lake City, where he won awards for track and a letter for football. He later attended the University of Utah, where he ran the 440-yard and mile relay. His college education was delayed twice. First, when he served as a missionary for the LDS Church in southern Brazil from 1939 to 1942. Then later when he served during World War II in the United States Army Air Corps where he was a First Lieutenant at the time of decommissioning.

On April 21, 1943, Faust married Ruth Wright, whom he had met at Granite High School. The wedding took place during a short leave during his military service, and they were sealed in the Salt Lake Temple.

== Career ==
Faust graduated from the University of Utah in 1948 with a B.A. and Juris Doctor. After graduation, he worked in a law firm in Salt Lake City.

In 1962, he was elected president of the Utah Bar Association, where he served for one year. The same association awarded him its Distinguished Lawyer Emeritus Award in 1996. During the 1960s, he was named to the Utah Legislative Study Committee and later to the Utah Constitutional Revision Commission.

Faust served in the House of Representatives for the 28th Utah State Legislature (1949) as a Democrat for Utah's eighth district. He also served as chairman of the Utah State Democratic Party and helped manage a campaign for Senator Frank Moss. In 1996, Faust was awarded with the Minuteman Award by the Utah National Guard.

Faust was appointed by U.S. President John F. Kennedy to the Lawyer's Committee for Civil Rights. He was also an advisor to the American Bar Journal.

In 1997, by legislative decree, Faust was made an honorary citizen of São Paulo, Brazil and received a national Brazilian citizenship award. "James Esdras Faust Street" in Campinas, Brazil was named in his honor by the city mayor in 2007.

== Church service ==
In 1949, at the age of 28, Faust became a bishop in the LDS Church. He later served on a stake high council, as stake president, and a regional representative.

Faust was called as an Assistant to the Quorum of the Twelve Apostles on October 6, 1972 and served in that capacity until October 1, 1976. At that time, the position was eliminated and he entered the First Quorum of the Seventy. In 1975, he presided over the Brazil area of the church. During his tenure, the São Paulo Brazil Temple was announced.

Before the 1978 revelation reversing the priesthood ban for men of African descent, Faust was head of the church's International Mission, with jurisdiction for Africa. Spencer W. Kimball privately consulted with Faust several times leading up to the change in policy.

Faust was accepted by common consent as a member of the Quorum of the Twelve Apostles on September 30, 1978, and ordained an apostle on October 1, filling the vacancy created by the death of Delbert L. Stapley. Faust continued as president of the International Mission after his call as an apostle. In early 1979, Faust became the first LDS apostle to travel to Nigeria. He and his wife traveled with missionaries Rendell M. and Rachel Mabey and Edwin Q. and Janath R. Cannon to meet with LDS Church members in Aboh, not far from Enugu, and give them guidance in the formation of the church. During this visit, Faust baptized five Nigerian men in the same spot where Anthony Obinna and 18 others had been baptized near the end of 1978.

He served in the Quorum of the Twelve until being set apart as Second Counselor in the First Presidency to church president Gordon B. Hinckley on March 12, 1995. He remained in that position until his death on August 10, 2007. Faust, together with Hinckley and First Counselor Thomas S. Monson, constituted the longest continuous serving First Presidency in the history of the LDS Church.

== Family and death ==
Faust and his wife, Ruth, raised five children: James Hamilton Faust, Janna R. Coombs, Marcus G. Faust, Lisa A. Smith, and Robert P. Faust. At the time of his death, they had 25 grandchildren and 28 great-grandchildren. He died on August 10, 2007, at his home in Salt Lake City, Utah, of causes incident to age. Following a funeral service in the Salt Lake Tabernacle, he was buried in the Holladay Memorial Park in Holladay, Utah. Ruth Wright Faust died February 10, 2008, at the age of 86.

== Published works ==
- Faust, James E. (2004). Finding Light in a Dark World. Deseret Book Company. ISBN 1-57345-100-2.
- —— (2002). True Gifts of Christmas. Eagle Gate Publishers. ISBN 1-57008-729-6.
- —— (2001). Stories from my Life. Deseret Book Company. ISBN 1-57345-968-2.
- —— (1990). Reach up for the Light. Deseret Book Company. ISBN 0-87579-418-1.
- —— (1980). To Reach Even unto You. Deseret Book Company. ISBN 0-87747-807-4.

Faust also authored; "In the Strength of the Lord: The Life and Teachings of James E. Faust" Hardcover – October, 1999

=== Hymns ===
Faust co-wrote the words to the LDS hymn "This is the Christ".

== Notes ==
The Church of Jesus Christ of Latter-day Saints titles
Preceded by Thomas S. Monson	Second Counselor in the First Presidency; March 12, 1995 – August 10, 2007	Succeeded by Henry B. Eyring
Preceded by David B. Haight	Quorum of the Twelve Apostles; October 1, 1978 – March 12, 1995	Succeeded by Neal A. Maxwell
