= Emmanuel A. Kissi =

Ghanaian religious leader

Emanuel Abu Kissi (born 24 December 1938) is a Ghanaian medical doctor, founder of a medical clinic, and leader in the Church of Jesus Christ of Latter-day Saints (LDS Church). He was originally one of only a few black Africans to have served as an area seventy in the church. He was the official head of the LDS Church in Ghana during its "freeze" in 1989–90, and has worked extensively to increase interfaith relationships in Ghana.

== Biography ==
Kissi was born in Abomosu, Ghana. He studied medicine in England. In 1979, while completing training in surgery in Macclesfield, Cheshire, England, he joined the LDS Church.

After his return to Ghana, Kissi and his wife, Elizabeth, who is a nurse, established a medical clinic in Accra which they named Deseret Hospital. The hospital at times has been aided by groups of LDS Church members from the United States. He has also been involved with trying to coordinate humanitarian medical care by other doctors in Ghana. Kissi was among those featured in the film Lives of Service about Latter-day Saints of African descent.

Initially after his return to Ghana, Kissi was a professor at Legon University medical school and was working as a general surgeon at Korle Bu Hospital.

The first Latter-day Saint he met in Ghana was Priscilla Sampson-Davis who was reading the Doctrine and Covenants while waiting for treatment at the hospital.

=== Church leadership ===
By 1982, Kissi was serving the LDS Church as a district president in Ghana. He had also been a branch president, and in the late 1980s he was a counselor in the presidency of the Ghana Accra Mission. Then in June 1989, the government of Ghana suspended all meetings of the LDS Church and expelled all foreign church representatives. Kissi was designated as the official head of the church in Ghana, a position he held until "The Freeze" was over in November 1990. At the same time, from 1989 to 1991, he was president of the Ghana Accra Mission.

After this Kissi served the church as a regional representative, then as a counselor in the mission presidency. Kissi was serving as patriarch of the Accra Ghana Lartebiokorshie Stake before being called as an area seventy, a position he held from 2002 to 2007. In 2004, he spoke at Brigham Young University (BYU) on the growth of the LDS Church in West Africa.

Kissi was present at the groundbreaking of the Accra Ghana Temple in 2001.

== Publications ==
Kissi wrote Walking in the Sand: A History of The Church of Jesus Christ of Latter-day Saints in Ghana, which was edited by Matthew K. Heiss and published BYU Press in 2004. It was reviewed by William Olsen. Kissi also has written a book review of Black and Mormon for BYU Studies.

An article by Kissi was published in the Liahona and Ensign in 2004.
