= David W. Eka =

David William Eka (born 20 May 1945 in Etinan, Nigeria) was the first stake president of the Church of Jesus Christ of Latter-day Saints (LDS Church) in West Africa. He was president of the Aba, Nigeria Stake and is often regarded as one of the founding pioneer members of the church in Nigeria. Eka has also served as an area seventy and as a mission president in the LDS Church.

== Biography ==
Eka was born in Etinan, Nigeria. He was the oldest of eight children of William Udo Eka and his wife Lucy Eduok Inyang Eka. His father was a carpenter. Eka himself was trained as a carpenter by his father. He was in his first year studying at a technical school when Nigeria was plunged into war. He committed to God that if he survived the Nigerian Civil War he would devote his life to serving others. On at least one occasion he states that his life was saved by guidance from a divine voice which made him feel he was being preserved to do a later work for the Lord.

Eka was first introduced to the LDS Church by an uncle, who had moved to live in the state of California in the United States and had then joined the LDS Church, in the early 1970s. His uncle had sent him a copy of The book of Mormon among other Church materials. In 1974, Eka married Ekaete Dennis Akpan. Starting in 1976 he pursued advanced education in England in instrumentation and control engineering while his wife also studied business and management. He often met LDS missionaries in England but did not then join the church. Eka got his bachelor's degree in electronics engineering from Teesside Polytechnic. Eka is an engineer by profession.

After returning to Nigeria, Eka joined the LDS Church in September 1979, less than a year after the first LDS baptisms in Nigeria. The baptism was performed by Spencer J. Palmer who had come on a short visit to Nigeria. Shortly after his baptism, he helped translate the Book of Mormon into Efik. A short time after his baptism, Eka was called as a counselor in the Africa West mission presidency, and in this position under four mission presidents.

Eka worked for Nigerian Agip Oil Company (NAOC) which he retired from as head of production support.

Eka served as a branch president, counselor to four different mission presidents, district president, and in 1988 became president of the newly organized Aba Nigeria Stake.

In 1990, Eka became a Regional Representative of the Twelve Apostles. From 1997 to 2001 he served as an Area Authority Seventy. From 2001 to 2004 he served as president of the Nigeria Lagos Mission of the church. After the dedication of the Aba Nigeria Temple, Eka became a sealer in that temple. In April 2007, Eka was again called as an area seventy in the church. He was again released as an area seventy in April 2009 general conference. Beginning in 2019, Eka served as president of the Aba Nigeria Temple.

Eka and his wife Ekaete are the parents of seven children.
