= F. Enzio Busche =

German general authority (1930–2020)

Emeritus General Authority
- 7 October 2000 – 28 May 2020
- Called by: Gordon B. Hinckley

First Quorum of the Seventy
- 1 October 1977 – 7 October 2000
- Called by: Spencer W. Kimball
- End reason: Granted general authority emeritus status

Personal details
- Born: Friedrich Enzio Busche; April 5, 1930; Dortmund, Germany
- Died: May 28, 2020 (aged 90); Bountiful, Utah, United States

Friedrich Enzio Busche (April 5, 1930 – May 28, 2020) was the first resident of Germany called as a general authority of the Church of Jesus Christ of Latter-day Saints (LDS Church).

Busche was born in Dortmund, Germany, and his family left that area after the beginning of the Second World War. Near the end of the war, Busche was drafted at age 14 into the German Army during the Nazi regime's desperate final push. After the war, Busche returned to Dortmund where he lived in a large part on the molasses that had poured out of a supply train American soldiers had attacked.

After the war, Busche completed high school and then studied at universities in Bonn and Freiburg. He then took over a printing business from his father. Under his direction, the company grew to be one of the larger ones in Germany. It was also one of the few companies in Germany at that time that used a participatory style of leadership.

Busche married Jutta Baum in 1955, and they were the parents of four children. Together, they joined the LDS Church in 1958.

== LDS Church service ==
He served in many local positions within the LDS Church, including as a counselor in the presidency of the Central German Mission. Busche served as regional representative to the German regions in 1973 and spoke at the continental Europe Area conference held that year in Munich.

Busche was called as a member of the church's First Quorum of the Seventy in October 1977. As a general authority, he served as president of the Germany Munich Mission from 1978 to 1980. From 1987 to 1989, he was president of the Frankfurt Germany Temple. In 2011, he was honored at the Provo, Utah, annual Freedom Festival Awards Gala.

In his 1993 general conference address, Truth Is the Issue, he taught, "In the depth of such a prayer, we may finally be led to that lonesome place where we suddenly see ourselves naked in all soberness. Gone are all the little lies of self-defense. We see ourselves in our vanities and false hopes for carnal security. We are shocked to see our many deficiencies, our lack of gratitude for the smallest things. We are now at that sacred place that seemingly only a few have courage to enter, because this is that horrible place of unquenchable pain in fire and burning. This is that place where true repentance is born. This is that place where the conversion and the rebirth of the soul are happening."

He served as a general authority until October 2000, when he was designated as an emeritus general authority.

Busche died on May 28, 2020, in Bountiful, Utah, at age 90.

== Works ==
Books

- Busche, F. Enzio (2004), Yearning for the Living God: Reflections from the Life of F. Enzio Busche, Deseret Book, ISBN 978-1-57008-984-8

== Selected BYU Speeches ==
- "Life Eternal" (June 2, 1981)
- "Christianity: The Hope of the Future" (May 31, 1983)
- "Rejoice in Christ Jesus, and Have No Confidence in the Flesh" (May 28, 1985)
