= Aba Nigeria Temple =

Temple of The Church of Jesus Christ of Latter-day Saints

- Interactive map of Aba Nigeria Temple
- Number: 121
- Dedication: 7 August 2005, by Gordon B. Hinckley
- Site: 6.3 acres (2.5 ha)
- Floor area: 11,500 ft^{2} (1,070 m^{2})
- Height: 72 ft (22 m)
- Official website • News & images

Church chronology
← San Antonio Texas Temple	Aba Nigeria Temple	→ Newport Beach California Temple

Additional information
- Announced: 2 April 2000, by Gordon B. Hinckley
- Groundbreaking: 23 February 2002, by H. Bruce Stucki
- Open house: 18 June – 2 July 2005
- Current president: Lekwauwa O. Agbai
- Designed by: Adeniyi Coker Consultants Limited
- Location: Aba, Abia, Nigeria
- Coordinates: 5°8′51.51839″N 7°21′24.1884″E
- Exterior finish: Namibian pearl granite
- Design: Classic modern, single-spire design
- Baptistries: 1
- Ordinance rooms: 2 (two-stage progressive)
- Sealing rooms: 2

The Aba Nigeria Temple is a temple of the Church of Jesus Christ of Latter-day Saints located on the outskirts of Aba, Abia State, Nigeria, north of the Ogbor River. Announced on April 2, 2000, by church president Gordon B. Hinckley during general conference, it became the first temple in Nigeria, the second in West Africa, and the third in Africa, following those in Johannesburg and Accra.

The single-spire building is 1,070 m^{2} (11,500 ft^{2}), has Namibian pearl granite on its exterior, and includes two instruction rooms, two sealing rooms, and a baptistry. The temple complex covers 2.5 ha (6.3 acres) and also includes patron housing, a stake center, and an administration office building.

== History ==
On April 2, 2000, Gordon B. Hinckley announced Nigeria's first temple during general conference. Two years later, on February 23, 2002, H. Bruce Stucki, a general authority and president of the church's Africa West Area, presided over a groundbreaking ceremony attended by more than 2,000 people, including government officials and tribal chiefs.

The temple site is on a hillside north of the Ogbor River, where early Nigerian converts had been baptized. The church constructed a concrete bridge to span the river and provide access to the site.

After construction was completed, a public open house was held from June 18 to July 2, 2005, with more than 25,000 visitors attending. Prior to this, about 100 media representatives and 800 community leaders toured the temple. Local church members also contributed to preparations, including sewing draperies, bedding, and other furnishings for the temple and housing facilities.

The temple was dedicated by Hinckley in four sessions on August 7, 2005, with 7,415 church members attending. At the time, Nigeria had more than 66,000 Latter-day Saints, with over 120,000 across West Africa. By 2021, church membership in Nigeria had grown to about 225,000 in roughly 770 congregations, and additional temples were later announced for Benin City, Eket, Lagos, and Calabar.

In June 2009, the temple was closed indefinitely due to rising violence and kidnappings in Aba. Gunfire was reported near the temple grounds, and bullets struck the guardhouse. Temple workers were evacuated, though the incidents were not directly linked to the temple or the church. A spokesman stated that the safety of its members and workers were the church's primary concern. The temple later reopened on a limited basis to serve local members. By the latter part of 2011, the temple had resumed regular operations.

== Design and architecture ==
The temple has a total floor area of 11,500 square feet (1,070 m^{2}). Its exterior is finished in Namibian pearl granite, and the landscaping features native palm trees, flowers, and shrubs. The building has a single spire, with a statue of the angel Moroni on its top.

The interior has African-inspired design elements. Makore wood, similar to mahogany, was used throughout, while Akala wood furniture was decorated with gold leafing. A designer adapted vivid colors and patterns after studying African textiles. Hand-sculpted carpets, decorative floor tiles, and stained-glass windows further reflect African motifs.

== Community participation ==
The temple was received as a significant milestone for Nigerian members. At the open house, Abia State deputy governor Clement Nwafor described the temple as “one of the greatest blessings in Nigeria.”

Community leaders, media, and religious figures attended tours before the open house, with many expressing admiration for the temple's design and purpose. Nigerian members also contributed through volunteer efforts such as choir rehearsals and temple preparation classes.

A cultural celebration featuring Nigerian youth dances took place on August 6, 2005, the day before the dedication. During the dedication weekend, Hinckley arrived at the temple by helicopter from Port Harcourt, where large crowds, including schoolchildren, gathered to greet him.

== Temple leadership and admittance ==
The church's temples are directed by a temple president and matron, each typically serving for a term of three years. The president and matron oversee the administration of temple operations and provide guidance and training for both temple patrons and staff. The temple's first president was Jerry Valient Kirk. In 2010, Alexander A. Odume was called as the temple president, the first Nigerian to serve in this capacity. In 2013, John A. Ihenkoro, a native of Aba, but then living in Abuja and serving as a stake patriarch, was called as the next temple president. In 2023, Lekwauwa O. Agbai was called as temple president, with his wife Loretta U. Agbai serving as matron.

Like all the church's temples, it is not used for Sunday worship services. To members of the church, temples are regarded as sacred houses of the Lord. Once dedicated, only church members with a current temple recommend can enter for worship.

== See also ==
- Comparison of temples of The Church of Jesus Christ of Latter-day Saints
- List of temples of The Church of Jesus Christ of Latter-day Saints
- List of temples of The Church of Jesus Christ of Latter-day Saints by geographic region
- Temple architecture (Latter-day Saints)
- The Church of Jesus Christ of Latter-day Saints in Nigeria
