= Gary L. Browning =

American linguist (1940–2024)

Gary L. Browning (1940–2024) was an American Russian language academic and was the first mission president of the Church of Jesus Christ of Latter-day Saints (LDS Church) in Russia, and the Baltic states of Estonia, Latvia, and Lithuania.

== Early life and education ==
Born in St. Maries, Idaho, Browning was a missionary for the LDS Church in Finland as a young man. Upon returning from his mission, he earned a bachelor's degree in Russian from Brigham Young University, a master's degree from Syracuse University, and a Ph.D. from Harvard University. In 1969, Browning lived in Moscow for six months while he worked as a guide for a United States Information Agency exhibit. In 1973, Browning returned to live in Russia for six months as he researched his Ph.D. dissertation.

== Academic career ==
Browning spent two years as a member of the faculty of Bryn Mawr College in Pennsylvania, and then joined the faculty of Brigham Young University in Provo, Utah as a professor of Russian language and literature. In the 1980s, he founded a Utah County chapter of Utahns Against the Nuclear Arms Race and became a peace activist.

== Involvement with LDS Church ==
In July 1990, Browning was asked by the LDS Church to become the president of the newly created Finland Helsinki East Mission of the church. This mission was headquartered in Helsinki, but all its assigned missionaries preached in Russia and the Baltic states. At the time, there were small branches of the LDS Church in Leningrad, Tallinn, Vyborg, and Moscow. The Leningrad Branch was the first LDS Church congregation to receive official recognition within Russia. Browning is recognized by the LDS Church as the first mission president in Russia and the Baltic states.

In February 1992, the Finland Helsinki East Mission was dissolved and divided into the Russia Moscow Mission and the Russia St. Petersburg Mission; Browning became the first president of the Moscow Mission and served in this capacity until July 1993. After his mission service, Browning returned as a faculty member of Brigham Young University. He served two terms as the chair of the Department of Germanic and Slavic Languages. He retired and is a professor emeritus of BYU.

== Publications and speeches ==
- Browning, Gary L. (Winter 1985). "American and Russian Perceptions of Freedom and Security". BYU Studies. 25 (1): 115–127.
- —— (1985). Boris Pilniak: Scythian at a Typewriter (Ann Arbor, Mich.: Ardis)
- —— (1985). Workbook to Russian Root List (Columbus, Ohio: Slavica)
- —— (1986) "The Death of Anna Karenina: Anna's Share of the Blame". Slavic and East European Journal. 30 (3): 327–339. 1986. doi:10.2307/307886. JSTOR 307886.
- ——. (2 November 1993) "Out of Obscurity: The Emergence of the Church of Jesus Christ of Latter-day Saints in 'That Vast Empire of Russia'", (Provo, Utah)
- —— (1997). Russia and the Restored Gospel (Salt Lake City, Utah: Deseret Book)
- —— (2010). A "Labyrinth of Linkages" in Tolstoy's Anna Karenina (Brighton, Mass.: Academic Studies Press)
