= Rendell N. Mabey =

American politician (1908–2000)

Rendell Noel Mabey (August 8, 1908 – November 8, 2000) was a speaker of the Utah House of Representatives, member of the Utah State Senate, and prominent leader of missionaries in the Church of Jesus Christ of Latter-day Saints. Mabey was among the first four LDS missionaries sent to Nigeria, and had previously been president of the Swiss Mission.

Rendell N. Mabey was the son of Charles R. Mabey. His father was governor of Utah. Mabey was born in Bountiful Utah. For the first twelve years of his life Mabey was raised in Bountiful, as had been his father. When he was 12 his father was elected governor of Utah and the family moved to Salt Lake City. He went to high school at Salt Lake City's East High School and then studied at the University of Utah. He served from 1929-1932 as an LDS missionary in Germany and Austria. He and the former Rachel Ivins Wilson were married on Christmas Eve, 1933 in the Salt Lake Temple. He received his law degree from the University of Utah.

Mabey practiced law for 51 years, 26 of them serving as city attorney for Bountiful, Utah.

In 1948 and 1956 Mabey ran unsuccessfully for the governorship of Utah.

He also served as a regent of the University of Utah, and chair of the Weber State University Board of Trustees.

Mabey was first elected to the Utah House of Representatives in 1942, serving as a Republican. Mabey was speaker of the Utah House in 1947-1948. He later was in the Utah State Senate, where he was majority leader.

Mabey was bishop of the Bountiful 17th ward, and on two occasions served as president of the Bountiful East Stake. In the LDS Church he served as a regional representative of the quorum of the 12. He was president of the Swiss mission from 1965-1968. Besides overseeing the LDS Church in Switzerland, he spearheaded the opening of LDS missionary work in Italy. The first large number of LDS missionaries assigned to Italy in the 20th-century had arrived in February 1965 under the direction of John Russon, Mabey's predecessor as mission president. Mabey kept up the efforts to establish the Church and among other things traveled to Sicily where he and Vincenzo di Francesca baptized Antonio Giurintano. On a second visit to Sicily in 1966 Mabey organized the first branch there. Mabey also oversaw LDS missionaries in Lebanon, and LDS Church members in Poland, as well as expatriate Latter-day Saints in all of Africa besides South Africa and Rhodesia, South-west Asia, Greece and Afghanistan. He and his wife, Rachel, along with Ted and Janath Cannon were the first four LDS missionaries sent to Nigeria and Ghana, arriving in late 1978. By the time they left there were over 1700 Latter-day Saints in those two countries organized into eight districts, all of which were presided over by natives of the country in which they were located. Among others they worked with during their year as missionaries were Joseph W. B. Johnson in Ghana and Anthony Obinna in Nigeria.

In 1984, he along with Gordon I. Allred published the book, Brother to Brother: The Story of the Latter-day Saint Missionaries Who Took the Gospel to Black Africa, based primarily on his recollections as well as over 1,300 pages of journal entries from his time as a missionary in Nigeria and Ghana.

== Sources ==
- Russell W. Stevenson. For the Cause of Righteousness: A Global History of Blacks and The Church of Jesus Christ of Latter-day Saints. Salt Lake City: Greg Kofford Books. p. 159-162.
- "Rendell Mabey dies at 92". Deseret News. November 11, 2000.
- "Obituary: Rendell Noel Mabey". Deseret News. November 10, 2000.
