= Thomas Biesinger =

Thomas Biesinger (December 20, 1844 – May 9, 1931) was a German convert to the Church of Jesus Christ of Latter-day Saints (LDS Church) and a Mormon missionary to the Austro-Hungarian Empire. Biesinger was the first Mormon missionary to preach in the present-day Czech Republic and Hungary.

Biesinger was born in Wiesenstetten, Württemberg, German Confederation. In 1862, he was taught about Mormonism from LDS Church missionaries and was baptized into the LDS Church in Lake Constanze.

In 1865, Biesinger emigrated to Utah Territory in the United States, settling in Lehi.

In October 1883, Biesinger was called to serve a mission for the church to Austria-Hungary. After three months of preaching in Vienna, Biesinger went to Prague in Bohemia and became the first Mormon missionary to preach in the Czech lands. He was arrested on 25 March 1883 and after a preliminary hearing he was confined in prison for 38 days. He was then tried and found guilty of canvassing as a missionary for a sect not approved of by the state and sentenced to 30 days imprisonment at hard labor and a fine of 30 florins. There was also suggestions at his trial that he was intending to lead people into the immoral practices of Mormon polygamy. After his release from prison, Biesinger again met one of the men who had testified against him at his trial, and baptized him into the LDS Church.

From August to December 1884, Biesinger preached in Switzerland. In early 1885, Biesinger was sent by apostle John Henry Smith to preach in Budapest, where he and Paul E. B. Hammer became the first LDS Church missionaries to preach in present-day Hungary. However, because Biesinger was known throughout the empire due to media coverage of his Prague trial, he was forced to leave Austria-Hungary again after three months in Budapest. Biesinger went to Bavaria to assist the emigration of German and Swiss Latter Day Saints to Utah Territory.

In the late 1880s, Biesinger again returned to Europe as a missionary in Switzerland and Germany. In 1928, at the age of 84, Biesinger travelled to Czechoslovakia as a missionary and obtained legal permission for the LDS Church to operate in that country. On 24 July 1929, the LDS Church established the Czechoslovakia Mission, which existed until the church was expelled from communist Czechoslovakia in 1950.

Biesinger practiced plural marriage and had four wives and 17 children. Biesinger died in Salt Lake City, Utah.
