= John E. Forsgren =

Swedish Mormon missionary

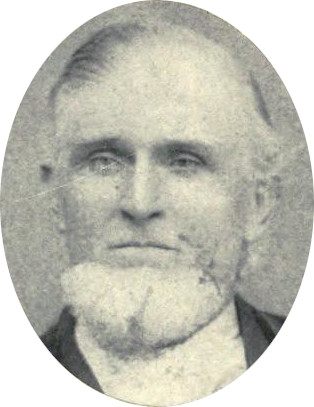
- Born: November 7, 1816; Gävle, Sweden
- Died: January 22, 1890 (aged 73); Salt Lake City, Utah
- Known for: Member of Mormon Battalion, missionary to Sweden

John Erik Forsgren (7 November 1816 – 22 January 1890) was a Mormon pioneer and missionary. He was the first missionary of the Church of Jesus Christ of Latter-day Saints (LDS Church) to preach in Sweden.

== Early life ==
Forsgren was born in Gävle, Sweden. At the age of nine, he began working on seafaring ships. While docked in Boston, Massachusetts in July 1843, Forsgren met missionaries of the Church of Jesus Christ of Latter Day Saints and was baptized. Shortly thereafter, he married fellow-Mormon Mary Ann Hunt. They moved to Nauvoo, Illinois to join the principal gathering of Latter Day Saints.

== Mormon Battalion ==
In 1846, Forsgren volunteered for the Mormon Battalion, and was the only Swede in the battalion that marched to San Diego, California. In 1847, after the battalion was discontinued, he met his wife in the Salt Lake Valley. In 1849, he married Sarah Bell Davis, his first of several plural wives.

== Mission to Scandinavia ==
In 1849, Erastus Snow, and Peter O. Hansen were called by the LDS Church to preach in Scandinavia. Forsgren petitioned to be permitted to join them, and his request was granted. After arriving in Copenhagen in 1850, Forsgren went alone to Sweden and began preaching in his hometown of Gävle. The first person he baptized was Peter Adolph Forsgren, his brother. (Peter Forsgren was the first person living in Scandinavia to be baptized into the LDS Church.)

As a result of his preaching against Lutheranism, Forsgren was charged with disruption of the peace and ordered to be deported to the United States. However, the captain of the ship Forsgren was placed on allowed Forsgren to leave the ship when it docked temporarily in Denmark, and Forsgren traveled to Copenhagen and was reunited with Snow and Hansen. In February 1852, Snow appointed Forsgren as his successor as president of the church's Scandinavian Mission, and Forsgren held this position until December, when he was replaced by Willard Snow.

== Leader of pioneer company ==
Upon completion of his mission, Forsgren became the leader of an emigrating company of approximately 300 Latter Day Saints from Scandinavia and northern Europe. The company departed from Liverpool on 1 January 1854 and arrived in Salt Lake City on 30 September.

== Later life and excommunication ==
In Utah, Forsgren initially settled in Brigham City, and later lived in Moroni, Santaquin, and Dover. He also lived in Carson City, Nevada for several years.

In 1879, Forsgren was excommunicated from the LDS Church for proclaiming himself to be a prophet and for denouncing church president Brigham Young. Forsgren began to refer to himself as "John J. Branch". He became regarded as an eccentric and was occasionally ridiculed in the Deseret News as the "Bench Prophet" because he lived in a tent near a bench in Salt Lake City, Utah. After his tent burnt down, he moved to Blaine County, Idaho, to live with a daughter. He died in Salt Lake City at a friend's house and was buried at Brigham City, Utah.

In 2010 a monument in the form of a bronze bust on a granite pedestal was erected in a public park near his childhood home at Övre Bergsgatan in Gävle.
