= Frankfurt Germany Temple =

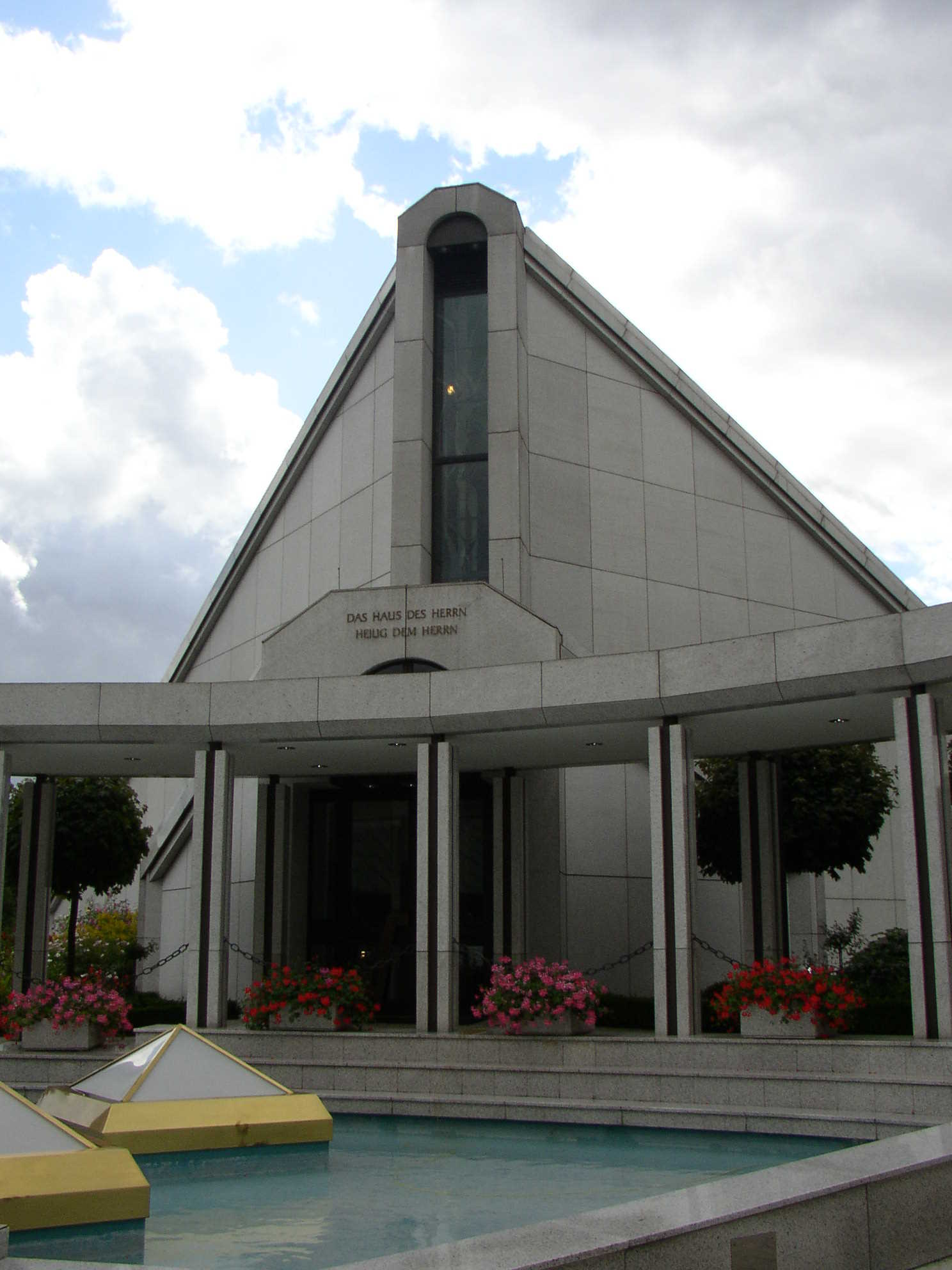
- Interactive map of Frankfurt Germany Temple
- Number: 41
- Dedication: 28 August 1987, by Ezra Taft Benson
- Site: 5.6 acres (2.3 ha)
- Floor area: 32,895 ft^{2} (3,056.0 m^{2})
- Height: 82 ft (25 m)
- Official website • News & images

Church chronology
← Denver Colorado Temple	Frankfurt Germany Temple	→ Portland Oregon Temple

Additional information
- Announced: 1 April 1981, by Spencer W. Kimball
- Groundbreaking: 1 July 1985, by Gordon B. Hinckley
- Open house: 29 July 29 – 8 August 1987; 13–28 September 2019
- Rededicated: 20 October 2019, by Dieter F. Uchtdorf
- Current president: K. Günter Borcherding
- Designed by: Church A&E Services and Borchers-Metzner-Kramer
- Location: Friedrichsdorf, Germany
- Coordinates: 50°15′29.76839″N 8°38′28.20839″E
- Exterior finish: White granite and copper roof
- Design: Modern, detached single-spire design
- Baptistries: 1
- Ordinance rooms: 4 (stationary)
- Sealing rooms: 4
- Clothing rental: Yes

The Frankfurt Germany Temple is the 43rd constructed and 41st operating temple of the Church of Jesus Christ of Latter-day Saints (LDS Church). Located in the city of Friedrichsdorf, Germany, it was built with the same general architecture as the six-spire design used in the Boise, Chicago, and Dallas temples, but it was only given a single-spire.

== History ==
The Frankfurt Germany Temple was announced on April 1, 1981, and originally dedicated on August 28, 1987, by church president Ezra Taft Benson. The temple was built on a 5-acre (20,000 m^{2}) plot, has 4 ordinance rooms and 5 sealing rooms, and a total floor area of 24,170 square feet (2,245 m^{2}). It was the first temple in West Germany. Germany's first temple was dedicated in Freiberg in June 1985, in what was then part of the German Democratic Republic.

After the reunification of Germany on October 3, 1990, Germany became the second country outside of the United States to have more than one temple. The first foreign country with more than one temple had been Canada where, less than six weeks earlier on August 25, 1990, the dedication of the Toronto Ontario Temple had taken place, joining the Cardston Alberta Temple, which was first dedicated in August 1923. With increased temple construction, initially begun by church president Gordon B. Hinckley in 1998, the number of temples both outside the United States and of countries having more than one temple has grown.

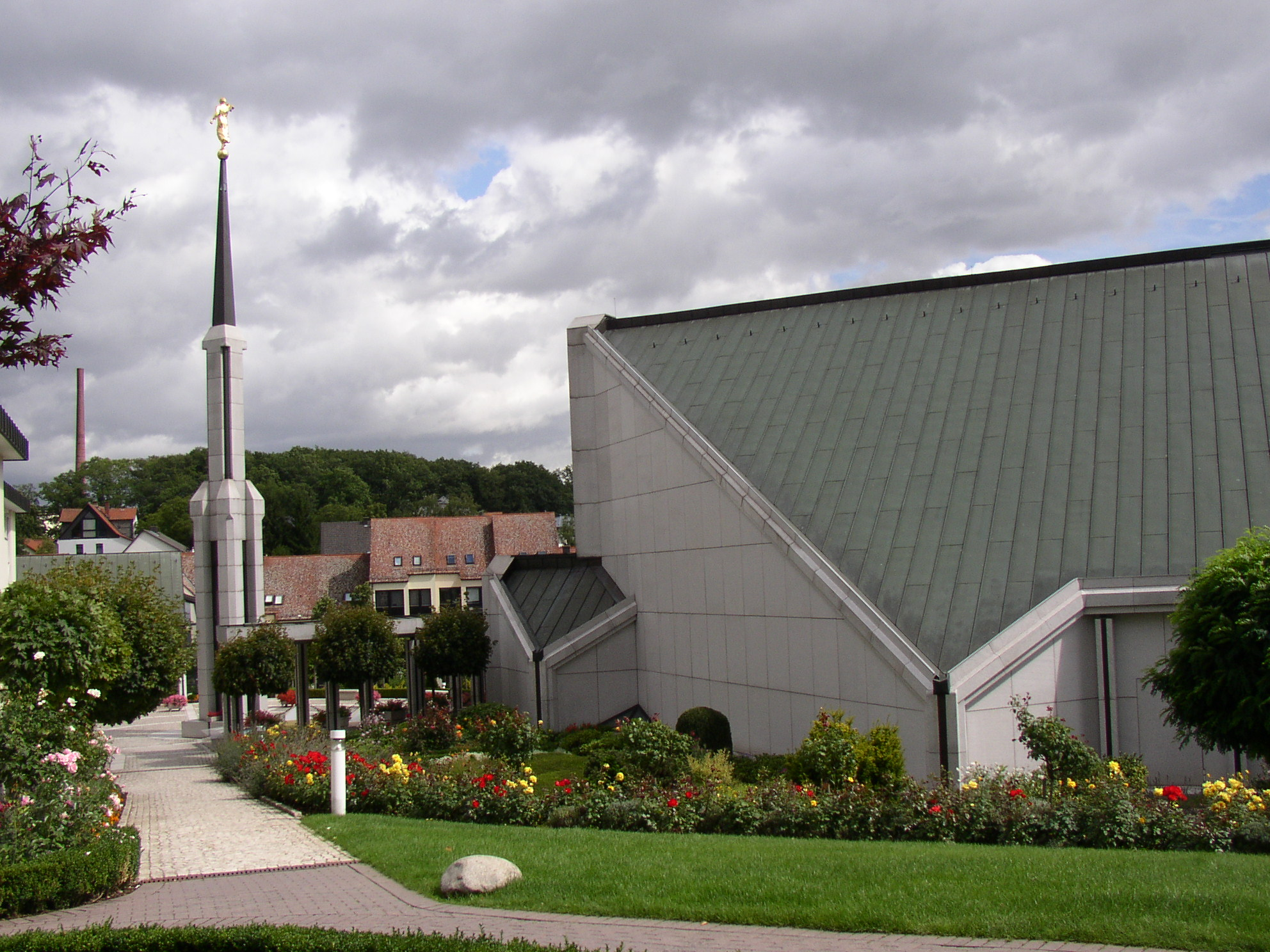
Entrance to the temple

Beginning September 7, 2015, the temple closed for renovations.

On March 5, 2019, the LDS Church announced the public open house would be held from September 13 through September 28, 2019, excluding Sundays. The temple was rededicated on October 20, 2019, by Dieter F. Uchtdorf.

In 2020, like all others in the church, the Frankfurt Germany Temple was closed in response to the COVID-19 pandemic.

== Presidents ==
Notable temple presidents include F. Enzio Busche (1987–89) and Edwin Q. Cannon (1989–92).

== See also ==
- Comparison of temples of The Church of Jesus Christ of Latter-day Saints
- List of temples of The Church of Jesus Christ of Latter-day Saints
- List of temples of The Church of Jesus Christ of Latter-day Saints by geographic region
- Temple architecture (Latter-day Saints)
- The Church of Jesus Christ of Latter-day Saints in Germany
