= Erastus Snow =

American religious leader (1818–1888)

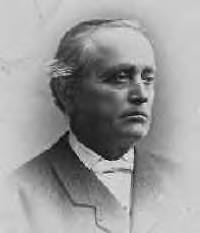

Quorum of the Twelve Apostles
- February 12, 1849 – May 27, 1888
- Called by: Brigham Young

LDS Church Apostle
- February 12, 1849 – May 27, 1888
- Called by: Brigham Young
- Reason: Reorganization of First Presidency; excommunication of Lyman Wight
- Reorganization at end of term: Marriner W. Merrill, Anthon H. Lund, and Abraham H. Cannon ordained

Personal details
- Born: Erastus Snow; November 9, 1818; St. Johnsbury, Vermont, United States
- Died: May 27, 1888 (aged 69); Salt Lake City, Utah Territory, United States
- Resting place: Salt Lake City Cemetery; 40°46′37.92″N 111°51′28.8″W
- Spouse(s): Artemisia Beman (married December 13, 1838); Minerva White (married April 2, 1844); Elizabeth Rebecca Ashby (married December 19, 1847); Julia Josephine Spencer (married 1856)
- Children: 36
- Signature

Erastus Snow (November 9, 1818 – May 27, 1888) was a member of the Quorum of the Twelve Apostles of the Church of Jesus Christ of Latter-day Saints (LDS Church) from 1849 until his death. Snow was a leading figure in the Mormon colonization of Arizona, Colorado, and New Mexico.

== Early life ==
Snow was born on November 9, 1818, in St. Johnsbury, Vermont, to Levi Snow (1782-1841) and Lucina Streeter Snow (1785-1858).

Snow was baptized a member of the LDS Church (at that time known as the Church of Christ) when he was 14 years old, on February 3, 1833, in Charleston, Vermont. Orson Pratt was one of the missionaries who taught him. Snow's older brothers, William Snow (1806-1879), and Zerubbabel Snow had previously joined the church on May 19, 1832.

Snow moved to Kirtland, Ohio, where the church was headquartered. In Kirtland, Snow was ordained a member of the Seventy in 1836 and witnessed the dedication of the Kirtland Temple in 1837.

== Career ==
Snow spent much of his time on missions, primarily in Pennsylvania. He later served a mission to Salem, Massachusetts, where he baptized several converts, including Nathaniel Ashby, a man with whom he shared a duplex when they both resided in Nauvoo, Illinois.

In April 1839, at age 20, Snow successfully petitioned the jailers at Liberty Jail to move Joseph Smith (founder of the Latter Day Saint movement) and the prisoners accompanying him to a different location. He was subsequently appointed a member of the high council of the church. In 1845, Snow received his endowment in the Nauvoo Temple. Over the course of his life, Snow served a total of sixteen missions to New England, St. Louis, Arizona, southern Utah, Denmark, Scandinavia, and Mexico. Writer George M. McCune has said of Snow: "He prevailed in debates over the Book of Mormon and healed and converted many during his life".

Snow was in the first Mormon pioneer company to journey to the Salt Lake Valley. He and Orson Pratt were the first two Mormons to enter the Valley, completing the journey on July 21, 1847. In October 1848, Snow began serving in the presidency of the Salt Lake Stake.

On February 12, 1849, Snow was ordained a member of the Quorum of the Twelve Apostles. On the same day, Charles C. Rich, Lorenzo Snow, and Franklin D. Richards were ordained. Snow served in this capacity until his death in 1888.

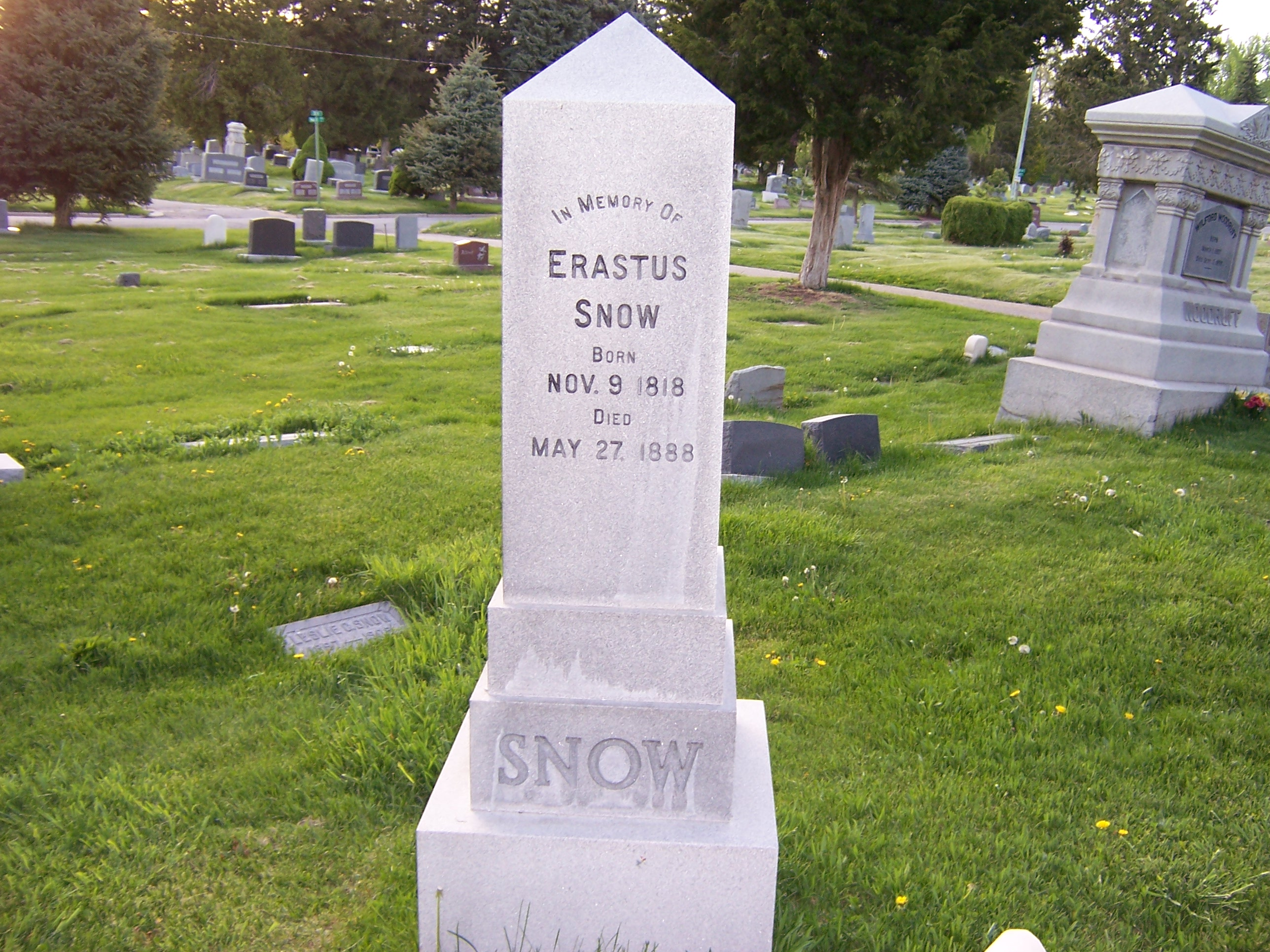
The grave marker of Erastus Snow

At the October 1849 general conference, Snow was assigned to lead a mission to Scandinavia. He had as a companion a Danish convert, Peter O. Hansen, who had joined the church in Boston. They focused most of their efforts in Denmark, but another convert had joined them, John E. Forsgren, who preached in Sweden.

While serving as a missionary in Denmark, Snow baptized the first Icelanders to join the church, ordained them to the priesthood, and sent them to Iceland to preach. Before the end of his mission, Snow began the publication of a church periodical in Danish.

In 1853, Snow was elected to the House of Representatives in the Utah territorial legislature. Later in the 1850s, Snow served as the presiding church authority in the midwestern United States, using St. Louis, Missouri as his headquarters. While in Missouri, Snow edited the periodical St. Louis Luminary. He returned to the Utah Territory in 1857 and engaged in farming.

In 1860, Snow went with Orson Pratt on a mission to the Eastern states. By the time they reached the Eastern United States, Abraham Lincoln had been elected president. With the impending war, they were able to convince many church members to move to Utah Territory. Much of this migration happened in 1861, after the American Civil War had begun.

After returning to Utah in 1861, Snow was made the apostle in charge of the southern Utah Mormon settlements. He lived in St. George.

== Personal life and death ==
Erastus Snow had four wives, 23 sons, and 13 daughters. His son Edward H. Snow followed him into the legislature as part of the first Senate after Utah achieved statehood. One of Snow's daughters, Elizabeth, became the wife of Anthony W. Ivins and the mother of Antoine R. Ivins.

Snow died on May 27, 1888, in Salt Lake City, Utah Territory, at age 69.

Snow's name is listed as one of the original pioneers on Cyrus Dallin's Brigham Young Monument in Temple Square.

== Legacy ==
- Snow Canyon State Park (near St. George, Utah)
- Snow College (in Ephraim, Utah)
- Snowflake, Arizona

== See also ==
- Hurricane, Utah

The Church of Jesus Christ of Latter-day Saints titles
Preceded by Lorenzo Snow	Quorum of the Twelve Apostles; February 12, 1849 – May 27, 1888	Succeeded by Franklin D. Richards
