= Accra Ghana Temple =

Temple of The Church of Jesus Christ of Latter-day Saints

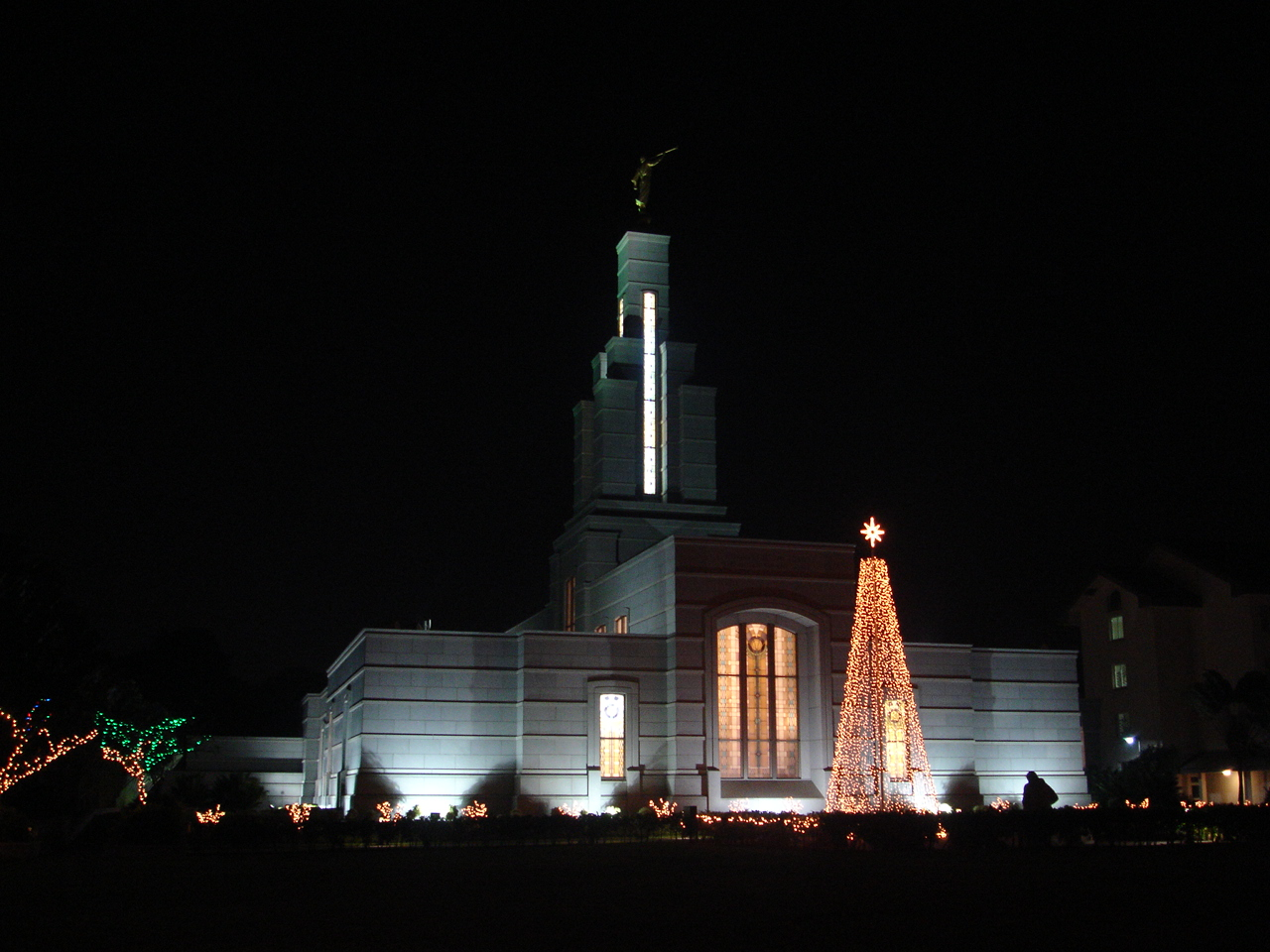
- The Accra Ghana Temple at Christmastime 2007
- Interactive map of Accra Ghana Temple
- Number: 117
- Dedication: 11 January 2004, by Gordon B. Hinckley
- Site: 6 acres (2.4 ha)
- Floor area: 17,500 ft^{2} (1,630 m^{2})
- Height: 90 ft (27 m)
- Official website • News & images

Church chronology
← Redlands California Temple	Accra Ghana Temple	→ Copenhagen Denmark Temple

Additional information
- Announced: 16 February 1998, by Gordon B. Hinckley
- Groundbreaking: 16 November 2001, by Russell M. Nelson
- Open house: 3–20 December 2003
- Current president: Anthony M. Kaku
- Designed by: ARUP
- Location: Accra, Ghana
- Coordinates: 5°34′2.964000″N 0°11′37.34159″W
- Exterior finish: Namibia Pearl granite
- Design: Classic modern, single-spire design
- Baptistries: 1
- Ordinance rooms: 2 (two-stage progressive)
- Sealing rooms: 2

The Accra Ghana Temple is a temple of the Church of Jesus Christ of Latter-day Saints in Accra, Ghana. The intent to build the temple was announced on February 16, 1998, by church president Gordon B. Hinckley. It is the first in Ghana. A single-story structure of more than 17,500 square feet, it was designed to reflect local culture and environment, using native materials such as Makore wood and Namibia Pearl granite. A groundbreaking ceremony, to signify the beginning of construction, was held on November 16, 2001, with Russell M. Nelson, then a member of the Quorum of the Twelve Apostles, presiding. After construction was completed, a public open house that was held, with more than 17,000 visitors attending. The temple was dedicated by Hinckley on January 11, 2004. The church's surrounding complex includes a missionary training center (MTC) and a stake center.

== History ==
The Accra Ghana Temple was announced by church president Gordon B. Hinckley on February 16, 1998. The announcement of the first temple in West Africa was met with great joy by church members in Ghana, particularly after a period of intense growth and a "freeze" on the church's activities in Ghana from 1989 to 1990, when members were forced to meet secretly in their homes. During his visit to Accra in 1998, Hinckley said a search for a temple site had been underway since 1993, but a suitable location had not been found until that year.

The temple is on a 6-acre (2.4 ha) property at Independence Avenue and Liberation Road. Ground was broken, and the site dedicated on November 16, 2001, by Russell M. Nelson of the Quorum of the Twelve Apostles.

Following construction, a public open house was held from December 3 to December 20, 2003. Approximately 17,000 visitors, including Ghanaian president John Kufuor and vice president Alhaji Aliu Mahama, toured the temple and its grounds. The temple was dedicated on January 11, 2004, in three sessions by Hinckley. During the dedicatory prayer, Hinckley stated that the dedication represented a "new day" for church members in West Africa, representing the dreams, hopes, and prayers of many people. Prior to the dedication, A youth cultural celebration, a tradition later used for a time with dedications, was held first for the Accra Ghana Temple, as requested by Hinckley, and was also the largest youth activity held by the church in Africa to that point. The temple serves a large area, including members in Ghana, Benin, Ivory Coast, Liberia, Sierra Leone, and Togo.

== Design and architecture ==
The temple was built in the third generation of small temples, with a single-spire design, reflecting the local culture and environment, using native materials and craftsmanship. It is on a 6-acre (2.4 ha) plot, and the surrounding landscape has native flowers and palm trees.

The structure stands 90 feet (27.4 m) tall, and is constructed with materials largely from the region, with its exterior using Namibia Pearl granite. It has a single attached spire, with a statue of the angel Moroni on top.

The temple has two ordinance rooms, two sealing rooms, and a baptistry. The interior woodwork, including moldings, is made of native makore wood, which is naturally resistant to termites. The furniture was largely custom-designed, using African elements such as lion's feet and elephant tusks. The celestial room has furniture that resembles a traditional chief's stool, representing that all were royals there. Chairs in the sealing rooms use a North African design to represent the tree of life. Murals showing the Ghanaian countryside are also used, while the stained-glass windows were designed to reflect African cultural themes.

The design uses Latter-day Saint symbolism as well as elements to honor local Ghanaian culture. One motif is a geometric diamond shape, which is repeated in the art-glass windows and woodwork throughout the temple. This symbol was chosen because it represents a turtle in local tradition, which signifies wisdom, a theme that designers felt was fitting for a "house of knowledge." The designers were careful to use universal geometric shapes rather than those specific to a single Ghanaian tribe, ensuring the temple's symbolism was universal.

== Community impact ==
The temple is considered a landmark in the church’s presence in Africa. The surrounding complex also includes a stake center and MTC. The Ghana Immigration Service (GIS) celebrated international women's day utilizing the stake center on site, which the church offered to help with protection from sexual exploitation, harassment, and abuse. The site has also been used in the past for other government agency events, including previous events for GIS, and Ghana’s Education and Health agencies. Due to an International Women's Day event, people walked around the temple site, enjoying its grounds, and expressed thanks for the use of the stake center, and the beauty of the grounds.

== Temple leadership and admittance ==
The church's temples are directed by a temple president and matron, each typically serving for a term of three years. The president and matron oversee the administration of temple operations and provide guidance and training for both temple patrons and staff. Serving from 2004 to 2006, Grant Gunnell was the first president, with Alice Gunnell serving as matron. As of 2025, Anthony Mua Kaku is the president and Doe Akua Afriyie Awudetsey Kaku is the matron.

Like all the church's temples, it is not used for Sunday worship services. To members of the church, temples are regarded as sacred houses of the Lord. Once dedicated, only church members with a current temple recommend can enter for worship.

== See also ==
Temples in Ghana
Red = Operating
Blue = Under Construction
Yellow = announced
Black = Closed for Renovations
- Billy Johnson (Mormon)
- Comparison of temples of The Church of Jesus Christ of Latter-day Saints
- List of temples of The Church of Jesus Christ of Latter-day Saints
- List of temples of The Church of Jesus Christ of Latter-day Saints by geographic region
- Temple architecture (Latter-day Saints)
- The Church of Jesus Christ of Latter-day Saints in Ghana
