= Peter O. Hansen =

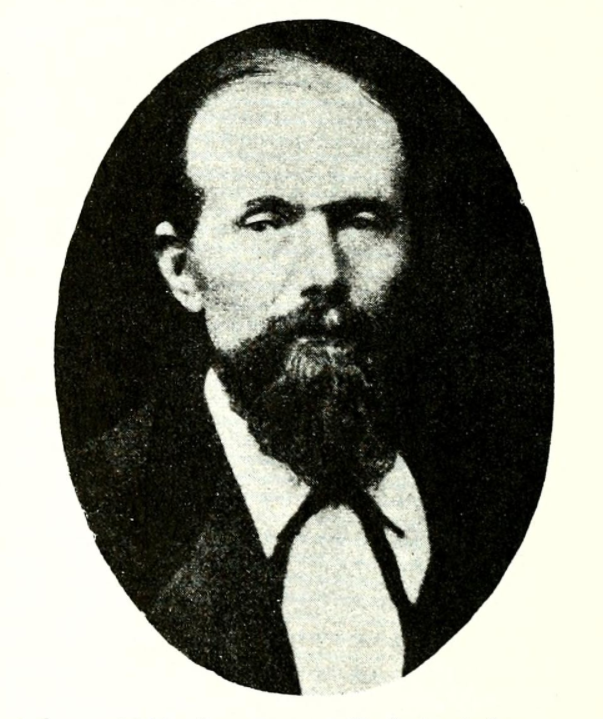
Peter Olsen Hansen (1818-1895)

Peter Olsen Hansen (11 June 1818 – 9 August 1895) was the translator of the Book of Mormon into Danish.

Hansen was born in Copenhagen, Denmark, and was a sailor by trade. Hansen had developed an interest in Mormonism as early as 1842 when he read a newspaper article, likely written by a Norwegian author, which spoke of "an ancient book called Mormon's Book" which was "found in a miraculous way by a young man whose name was Joseph Smith." He joined the Church of Jesus Christ of Latter Day Saints in Boston in 1844. After this, Hansen moved to the Mormon movement's headquarters in Nauvoo, Illinois that same year, intent to translate the Book of Mormon into his mother tongue. Also at Nauvoo. Hansen assisted in building the Nauvoo Temple. Hansen later became a Mormon pioneer, arriving in the Salt Lake Valley in September 1847.

In 1849, Hansen was at last selected to accompany Erastus Snow on the first Latter-day Saint mission to Denmark. He arrived in Copenhagen on 11 May 1850, and, soon after arriving, began attending Baptist worship services, quickly befriending several people and successfully converting two families to the Mormon faith down the line. His translation work continued during this time, enlisting his former schoolteacher 'Miss Mathisen' to review his translation in 1850, before finally completing and publishing it in 1851. All in all, he served on this mission from 1849 to 1855, during which he served as the first editor of the Skandinaviens Stjerne. Hansen later served additional missions in Denmark from 1873 to 1875 and from 1880 to 1882.

Hansen died at Manti, Utah Territory.
