= Edwin Q. Cannon =

American politician (1918–2005)

President of the Switzerland Mission
- 1971 – 1974
- Called by: Joseph Fielding Smith

Utah House of Representatives

In office
- 1956 – 1960

Utah House of Representatives

In office
- 1948 – 1950
- Political party: Republican

Personal details
- Born: Edwin Quayle Cannon, Jr. May 6, 1918; Salt Lake City, Utah
- Died: April 6, 2005 (aged 86); Salt Lake City, Utah
- Resting place: Salt Lake City Cemetery; 40°46′37.92″N 111°51′28.8″W
- Education: MBA degree
- Alma mater: University of Utah; Harvard Business School
- Spouse(s): Janath Russell
- Children: 6
- Parents: Edwin Quayle Cannon, Sr. Luella Edith Wareing
- Relatives: George Q. Cannon (grandfather)

Edwin Quayle "Ted" Cannon Jr. (May 6, 1918 – April 6, 2005) was a Utah politician and businessman and was a prominent leader and missionary in the Church of Jesus Christ of Latter-day Saints (LDS Church). Cannon was among the first missionaries of the LDS Church to preach to black people in West Africa (specifically in Nigeria and Ghana) and was part of the first group of missionaries sent to establish official congregations of the church in West Africa.

== Early life, mission, and family ==
Cannon was born in Salt Lake City, Utah to Edwin Q. Cannon, Sr. and Luella Wareing. He was born at his parents' home because of the 1918 influenza pandemic. Cannon's paternal grandfather was George Q. Cannon, who had served in the LDS Church's First Presidency for several decades before his death in 1901. Cannon was raised in Salt Lake City.

In 1937, Cannon went on a mission for the LDS Church to Nazi Germany. He was president of a branch of the church in Berlin in 1939 when the LDS Church evacuated its missionaries from Europe at the beginning of World War II. Cannon finished his mission in eastern Canada and returned to Utah in 1940.

In 1941, Cannon married Janath Russell in the Salt Lake Temple. They had six children together.

== Education, career, and politics ==
In 1942, Cannon graduated with a bachelor's degree from the University of Utah and in 1943 graduated from Harvard Business School with an MBA degree. After graduating, he managed a Cannon family business, the Salt Lake Stamp Company.

In 1948, Cannon was elected as a Republican member of the Utah House of Representatives for Salt Lake County. He was re-elected in 1956 and 1958 and served three full terms.

== LDS Church service ==
From 1964 to 1971, Cannon was a bishop in Salt Lake City. From 1971 to 1974, he was the president of the Switzerland Mission. By the end of his service the mission had been renamed the Switzerland Zurich Mission. It only covered German-speaking Switzerland, French -speaking Switzerland being in a mission based in France. Daniel C. Peterson was among the missionaries who served under Cannon.

In 1978, the LDS Church announced a revelation ending the previous restrictions on black people receiving the priesthood or participating in temple ordinances. Three weeks after the announcement, Cannon traveled to Africa on behalf of the church with Merrill J. Bateman to assess the prospects for missionary work and growth in West Africa. They visited Nigeria and Ghana on the trip. (At the time, Cannon was a counselor to James E. Faust in the church's International Mission, which had jurisdiction over all areas of the world not otherwise part of a mission.) After Bateman and Cannon reported the results of their trip, Cannon and his wife were called and set apart as the church's first missionaries to West Africa. They—along with Rendell and Rachel Mabey—preached in Nigeria and Ghana, baptized hundreds of converts, and established 35 branches and 5 districts of the church. The first convert baptized in Nigeria was Anthony Obinna.

In the late 1980s, Cannon and his wife were the directors of the church's visitors' center in Nauvoo, Illinois. For three months in 1989, Cannon was the interim president of the church's (Germany) Hamburg Mission, while the regular mission president was working on getting church missionaries admitted to East Germany.

Cannon later served as the second president of the Frankfurt Germany Temple from 1989 to 1992.

== Death ==
Cannon died at and was buried in Salt Lake City, Utah.

== Sources ==
- Alexander B. Morrison (1990). The Dawning of a Brighter Day: The Church in Black Africa (Salt Lake City, Utah: Deseret Book) ISBN 0-87579-338-X
- 2008 Deseret Morning News Church Almanac (Salt Lake City, Utah: Deseret Morning News, 2007)
