= Janath R. Cannon =

American Mormon missionary

First Counselor in the general presidency of the Relief Society
- 1974 – 1978
- Called by: Barbara B. Smith
- Predecessor: Marianne C. Sharp
- Successor: Marian R. Boyer

Personal details
- Born: Janath Russell Cannon; October 28, 1918; Ogden, Utah, United States
- Died: July 5, 2007 (aged 88); Bountiful, Utah, United States
- Resting place: Salt Lake City Cemetery; 40.777°N 111.858°W
- Spouse(s): Edwin Q. Cannon
- Children: 6
- Parents: Dr. George Oscar Russell; Oertel Rich Russell

Janath Russell Cannon (October 28, 1918 – July 5, 2007) was a counselor to Barbara B. Smith in the general presidency of the Relief Society of the Church of Jesus Christ of Latter-day Saints (LDS Church). Cannon was also a prominent missionary in the church and was among the first to preach to black people in Africa.

Born in Ogden, Utah, Janath Russell was educated at Wellesley College. In 1941, she married Edwin Q. Cannon in the Salt Lake Temple.

From 1971 to 1974, Cannon and her husband served in the church's Switzerland Mission, while he was the mission president. Upon their return to Utah in 1974, Cannon became the first counselor to Smith in the general presidency of the church's Relief Society. Cannon served in this capacity until 1978, when she was released so that she and her husband could become the first missionaries of the church to preach in "black Africa". They — along with Rendell and Rachel Mabey — preached in Nigeria and Ghana, baptized hundreds of converts, and established 27 branches of the LDS Church in Nigeria and Ghana. The first convert baptized in Nigeria was Anthony Obinna.

In the late 1980s, Cannon and her husband were the directors of the LDS Church's visitors' center in Nauvoo, Illinois. In 1989, they served as interim leaders of the church's Germany Hamburg Mission; during this time, the regular president of the mission was working on getting the church's missionaries admitted to East Germany.

From 1989 to 1992, Cannon was the matron of the Frankfurt Germany Temple, while her husband served as the temple president.

Cannon was a member of the Mormon Tabernacle Choir for 18 years and during this time edited the choir's newsletter, Keeping Tab. Cannon was the editor or author of a number of books on LDS Church-related topics.

Cannon died in Bountiful, Utah, and was buried in the Salt Lake City Cemetery.

== Publications ==
- Janath R. Cannon (ed.) (1991). Nauvoo Panorama: Views of Nauvoo Before, During, and After Its Rise, Fall, and Restoration (Nauvoo, Ill.: Nauvoo Restoration Inc.)
- Jill Mulvay Derr, Janath Russell Cannon, and Maureen Ursenbach Beecher (2002). Women of Covenant: The Story of Relief Society (Salt Lake City, Utah: Deseret Book) ISBN 1-57345-604-7

The Church of Jesus Christ of Latter-day Saints titles
Preceded by Marianne C. Sharp	First Counselor in the general presidency of the Relief Society; 1974–1978	Succeeded by Marian R. Boyer
