= Anthony Obinna =

Personal details
- Born: Anthony Uzodimma Obinna; April 15, 1928; Umuelem Enyiogugu, Aboh Mbaise, Imo State, Nigeria
- Died: August 25, 1995 (aged 67)
- Spouse(s): Fidelia Njoku
- Parents: Obinna Ugochukwu (father)

Anthony Uzodimma Obinna (April 15, 1928 – August 25, 1995), born in Umuelem Enyiogugu in Aboh Mbaise, (local government area of Imo State, Owerri) in Nigeria, was the first convert to the Church of Jesus Christ of Latter-day Saints (LDS Church) in Nigeria.

Obinna's family were followers of a tribal religion, but while still young, Obinna became a Christian. He became employed as a school teacher.

In 1965, Obinna had a vision in which Jesus Christ showed him rooms in a beautiful building. In 1971, he found an article in Reader's Digest, which had a picture of this building, and he discovered it was the Salt Lake Temple of the LDS Church.

He contacted the headquarters of the Church and received literature. The Church informed him that it had no plans to send missionaries to Nigeria. However, Obinna organized an unofficial congregation of the Church while waiting to be baptized a member of the church. In 1978, after the Church of Jesus Christ of Latter-day Saints lifted its restriction on black people holding the priesthood (in June), in leadership training meetings before the October General Conference, a letter from Obinna pleading for missionaries to be sent hastily was one of a few that Spencer W. Kimball read to emphasize a need to move quickly in sending missionaries to Nigeria and Ghana. In November 1978, Mormon missionaries traveled to Nigeria and baptized Obinna and a number of other converts. Immediately after his baptism, he was ordained a priest and appointed as the branch president. It is thought that Obinna was the first black person to serve as a branch president in the Church; certainly, he was the first black man to serve in such an office in Africa (although a black man in South Africa in the 1920s and 1930s had presided over a congregation designated by the Church as a branch, he was not ordained to the priesthood during his lifetime). When the branch was organized in Obinna's village, his brothers were called as his counselors in the branch presidency.

After his ordination to the priesthood, Obinna baptized his wife Fidelia. She served as the first black Relief Society president in Africa. Obinna and his wife were sealed in the Logan Utah Temple in 1989.
