= The Church of Jesus Christ of Latter-day Saints in Florida =

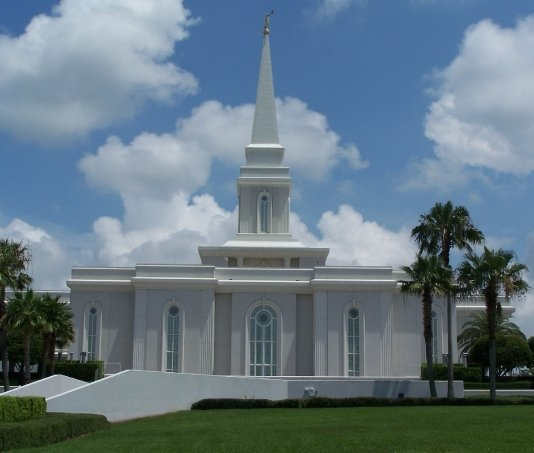
- The Orlando Florida Temple
- Area: US Southeast
- Members: 178,456 (2025)
- Stakes: 33
- Wards: 227
- Branches: 60
- Total Congregations: 287
- Missions: 5
- Temples: 3 operating 2 under construction 5 total
- FamilySearch Centers: 84

The Church of Jesus Christ of Latter-day Saints in Florida refers to the Church of Jesus Christ of Latter-day Saints (LDS Church) and its members in Florida. The LDS Church represents about 1% of the population of Florida according to the Pew Research Center 2014 Religious Landscepe Survey. Official membership statistics show the church representing about 0.75% of the general population. Florida has the 8th largest membership population in the United States and the largest membership population east of the Mississippi. The LDS Church is the 6th largest denomination in Florida.

== History ==
Membership in Florida
Year	Membership
1904	1,230
1930	3,164
1974	28,915
1980	36,811
1990	82,413
1999	108,955
2009	131,621
2019	160,266
2025	178,456
Source: Windall J. Ashton; Jim M. Wall, Deseret News, various years, Church Almanac State Information: Florida

In April 1843, Joseph Smith called William Brown and Daniel Cathcart to serve a mission to Pensacola, but no record exists of them fulfilling the calling. Between April and June 1854, Phineas Young visited the Indian chiefs in Florida and distributed copies of the Book of Mormon.

Missionaries began preaching in Pensacola in January 1895 and started a number of Sunday Schools soon afterwards. The first was in Coe Mills in May 1895. The first branch, known as the Hassell Branch, was created in Jefferson County on May 9, 1897. In September 1897, the Sanderson Branch was organized. George P. Canova, a well-to-do landowner and chairman of the Baker County Commission, became the branch president in January 1898. Five months later, following threats of violence, Canova was killed as he returned home from a church meeting.

In 1906, Charles A. Callis became president of the Florida Conference. That same year, a meetinghouse was dedicated in Jacksonville. Another meetinghouse was completed in Oak Grove in 1907. In 1909, missionaries began working in Miami during the winter months. Three years later, four Latter-day Saint pioneer families from Arizona moved to Florahome, Putnam County and established a Sunday School. In 1914, Julius C. Neubeck of Miami was called on a seven-month mission by Callis and became the first missionary from that city. He then became presiding elder of the church in Miami following his mission.

By 1925, branches or Sunday Schools existed in Florahome, (Putnam County), Jacksonville, Sanderson, Tampa, Miami and in other places throughout the state. In February and March 1925, church president Heber J. Grant visited Jacksonville and held public meetings. Ten years later, the Florida District had 22 branches, and the West Florida District had another 13 branches.

The first stake in Florida and in the South was created in Jacksonville on January 19, 1947, by Callis, who by then was a member of the Quorum of the Twelve. Alvin C. Chace, a grandson of early leader George P. Canova, was called as the first president.

Due to the influx of immigrants Florida received over the past few decades from the Caribbean and other countries, branches and wards were created to accommodate foreign speaking individuals in Florida. The first Spanish-speaking stake in the southeastern United States was organized in Miami. This was followed by the creation of a second Spanish-speaking stake in Hialeah Gardens in 1998.

On October 9, 1994, church president Howard W. Hunter dedicated the Orlando Florida Temple. On January 19, 1997, church president Gordon B. Hinckley addressed more than 5,000 members at a conference in Jacksonville commemorating the stake's 50th anniversary.

The LDS Church has assisted in recovery efforts from several natural disasters in Florida, and many Florida church members have responded to additional calls to give aid in surrounding states, such as the cleanup efforts following Hurricane Katrina, and Hurricane Irma, and major flooding in Georgia. Increasing membership has enabled the magnitude of the church's involvement in disaster relief to grow substantially over time. In 2019, church president Russell M. Nelson visited Orlando and spoke to 15,000 members at the Amway Center and visited with the owner of Pulse nightclub, the gay nightclub in Orlando where a gunman killed 49 people in a mass shooting.

== Deseret Ranches ==
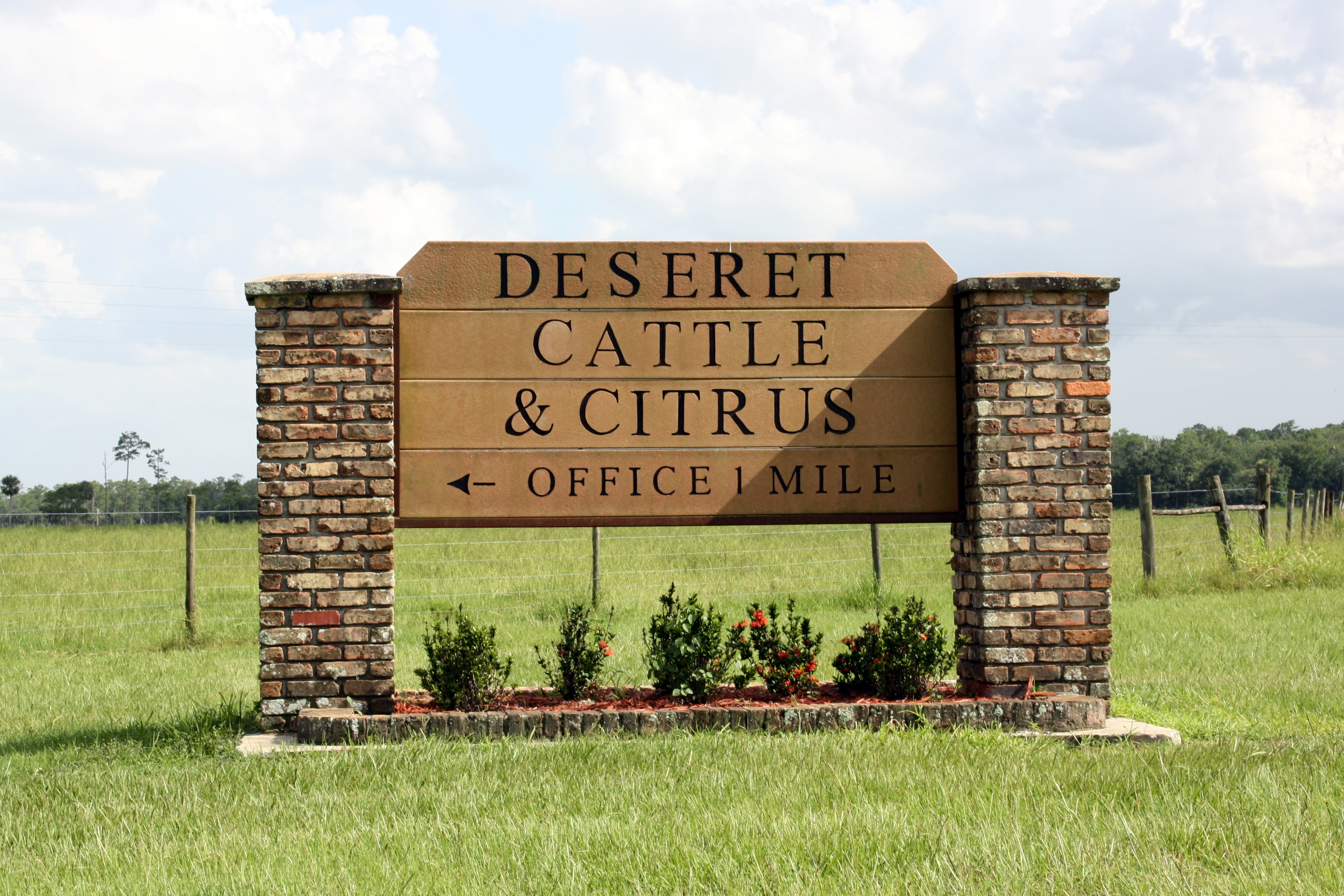
Deseret Ranches in St. Cloud, Florida

In 1950, more than 50,000 acres (200 km^{2}) was purchased by the church and which is now known as Deseret Ranches. Deseret Ranches, now part of the Cattle division of AgReserves, encompasses 295,000-acres and extends across Orange, Osceola and Brevard counties and is seen as critical to the Orlando region's water supply. The ranch is home to about a quarter million citrus trees, timberland, tree farms, commercial crops, and large deposits of fossilized seashells used in road base.

In 2013, the LDS Church purchased 382,834 acres from St. Joe Company in Bay, Calhoun, Franklin, Gadsden, Gulf, Jefferson, Leon, Liberty and Wakulla counties. The land, primarily timberland, was purchased for $565 million. The LDS Church is now Florida's largest private landowner. In 2020, the LDS Church sold more than 20,000 acres of land surrounding Lake Wimico in Florida to The Nature Conservancy who then donated the land to the state and the Florida Department of Environmental Protection.

== Stakes ==
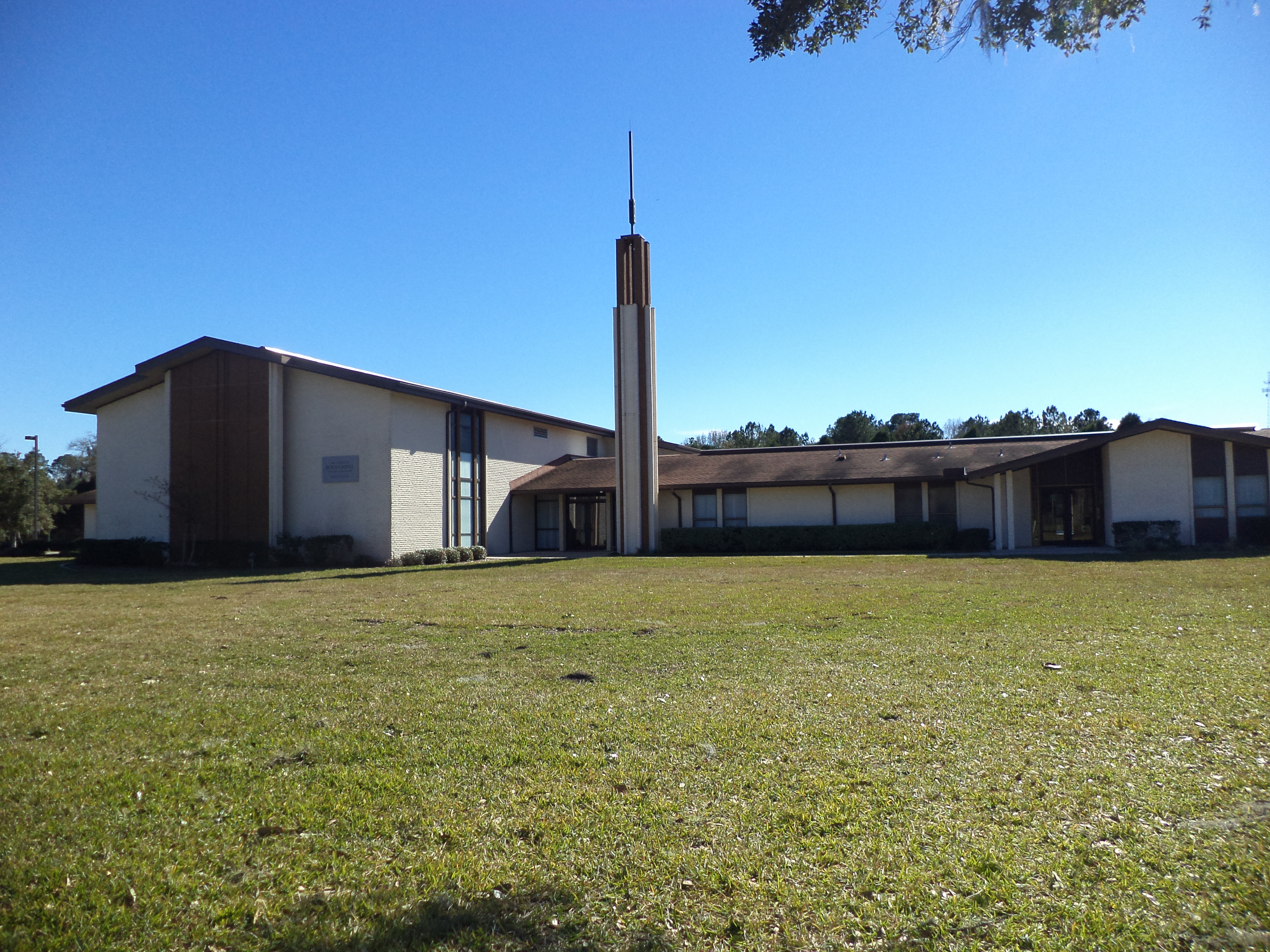
A meetinghouse in Macclenny, Florida

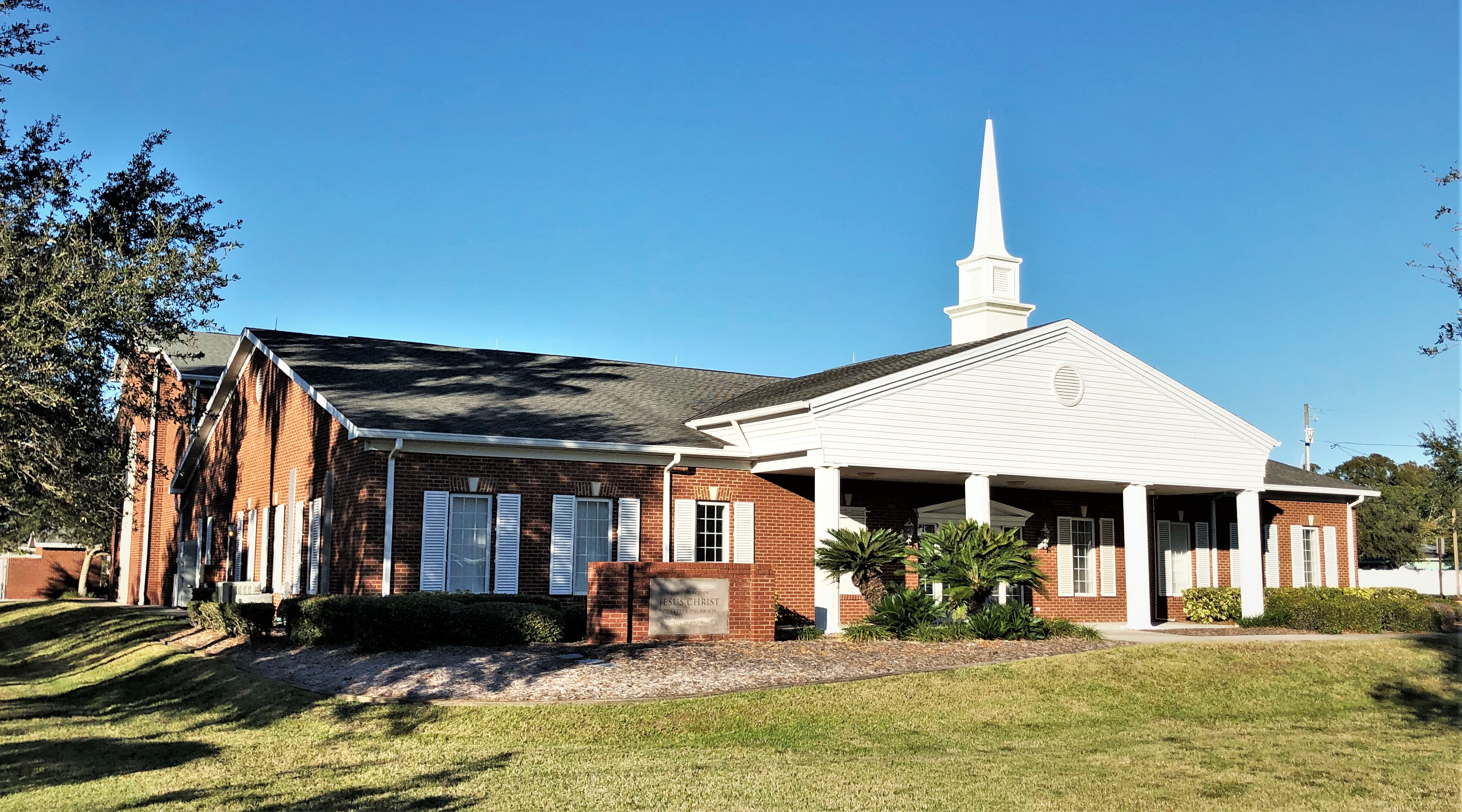
A meetinghouse in Gulfport, Florida

As of July 2026, Florida had the following stakes:

Stake	Organized	Mission	Temple
Boynton Beach Florida	17 Aug 2014	Florida Fort Lauderdale	Fort Lauderdale Florida
Brandon Florida	23 Aug 1992	Florida Tampa	Orlando Florida
Cocoa Florida	13 Nov 1977	Florida Orlando	Orlando Florida
Coral Springs Florida	16 Jan 1994	Florida Fort Lauderdale	Fort Lauderdale Florida
DeLand Florida	20 Sep 1998	Florida Orlando	Orlando Florida
Dothan Alabama (Note: Stake located outside Florida with congregation(s) meeting in Florida)	2 Mar 1986	Florida Tallahassee	Tallahassee Florida
Fort Myers Florida	13 May 1984	Florida Tampa	Fort Lauderdale Florida
Fort Walton Beach Florida	7 Jan 1996	Florida Tallahassee	Tallahassee Florida
Gainesville Florida	29 Feb 1976	Florida Jacksonville	Orlando Florida
Jacksonville Florida East	15 Sep 1968	Florida Jacksonville	Orlando Florida
Jacksonville Florida South	21 Jun 2009	Florida Jacksonville	Orlando Florida
Jacksonville Florida West	19 Jan 1947	Florida Jacksonville	Orlando Florida
Kingsland Georgia	15 Nov 1987	Florida Jacksonville	Tallahassee Florida
Lake City Florida	16 Mar 1986	Florida Jacksonville	Tallahassee Florida
Lakeland Florida	27 Jun 1980	Florida Tampa	Orlando Florida
Lake Mary Florida	9 Nov 2014	Florida Orlando	Orlando Florida
Leesburg Florida	14 Nov 1982	Florida Orlando	Orlando Florida
Miami Florida (Spanish)	13 Nov 1960	Florida Fort Lauderdale	Fort Lauderdale Florida
Miami Lakes Florida	25 Jan 1998	Florida Fort Lauderdale	Fort Lauderdale Florida
Naples Florida	23 Sep 2018	Florida Fort Lauderdale	Fort Lauderdale Florida
Ocala Florida	30 Jun 2019	Florida Tampa	Orlando Florida
Odessa Florida	16 Oct 2016	Florida Tampa	Orlando Florida
Orlando Florida Citrus Ridge	27 Apr 2025	Florida Orlando	Orlando Florida
Orlando Florida	23 Feb 1958	Florida Orlando	Orlando Florida
Orlando Florida South	30 Aug 1992	Florida Orlando	Orlando Florida
Palm Bay Florida	10 Jan 2016	Florida Orlando	Orlando Florida
Panama City Florida	16 Nov 1975	Florida Tallahassee	Tallahassee Florida
Pensacola Florida	15 Jun 1969	Florida Tallahassee	Tallahassee Florida
Sarasota Florida	17 May 2009	Florida Tampa	Orlando Florida
St Augustine Florida	29 Mar 2026	Florida Jacksonville	Orlando Florida
St Cloud Florida	6 Nov 2005	Florida Orlando	Orlando Florida
St Petersburg Florida	18 Aug 1974	Florida Tampa	Orlando Florida
Stuart Florida	12 Oct 1980	Florida Fort Lauderdale	Fort Lauderdale Florida
Tallahassee Florida	21 Jan 1973	Florida Tallahassee	Tallahassee Florida
Tampa Florida	25 Oct 1959	Florida Tampa	Orlando Florida
Winter Garden Florida	23 Aug 2020	Florida Orlando	Orlando Florida

== Missions ==
On March 1, 1894, Florida became part of the Southern States Mission. The Florida Mission was then organized from the Southern States Mission on November 1, 1960. From the Florida Mission the Florida Tallahassee Mission and the Florida South Mission were formed on July 1, 1971. On June 20, 1974, the Florida South Mission changed its name to the Florida Fort Lauderdale Mission. Three additional missions has been created in Florida since then.

Mission	Organized
Florida Orlando Mission	1 July 1998
Florida Fort Lauderdale Mission	1 November 1960
Florida Tallahassee Mission	June 2024
Florida Jacksonville Mission	1 July 1987
Florida Tampa Mission	1 July 1976

== Temples ==
The state of Florida has five temples in various stages of construction or operation. The first, the Orlando Florida Temple, was dedicated on October 9, 1994, by church president Howard W. Hunter. The Fort Lauderdale Florida Temple was announced by church president Thomas S. Monson on October 3, 2009, with ground broken for its construction on June 18, 2011. A public open house took place from March 29 to April 19, 2014. The temple was dedicated by Dieter F. Uchtdorf of the church's First Presidency on May 4, 2014. The temple is designed to serve an estimated 25,000 church members in South Florida. As of November 2022, current church president Russell M. Nelson has announced temples to be constructed in Tallahassee, Tampa, and Jacksonville.

Temples in Florida
- = Operating
- = Under construction
- = Announced
- = Temporarily Closed

46. Orlando Florida Temple (Closed for renovation); Official website; News & images	
Location: Announced: Groundbreaking: Dedicated: Size: Style:	Windermere, Florida, United States; April 6, 1991 by Ezra Taft Benson; June 20, 1992 by James E. Faust; October 9, 1994 by Howard W. Hunter; 70,000 sq ft (6,500 m^{2}) on a 13-acre (5.3 ha) site Classic modern, single-spire design - designed by Scott Partnership Architects
143. Fort Lauderdale Florida Temple; Official website; News & images	
Location: Announced: Groundbreaking: Dedicated: Size: Style: Notes:	Davie, Florida, U.S. October 3, 2009 by Thomas S. Monson; June 18, 2011 by Walter F. González; May 4, 2014 by Dieter F. Uchtdorf; 30,500 sq ft (2,830 m^{2}) on a 16.82-acre (6.81 ha) site Classic modern, single-spire design A public open house took place from March 29 to April 19, 2014.
202. Tallahassee Florida Temple; Official website; News & images	
Location: Announced: Groundbreaking: Dedicated: Size:	Tallahassee, Florida, United States; 5 April 2020 by Russell M. Nelson; 5 June 2021 by James B. Martino; 8 December 2024 by Patrick Kearon; 29,225 sq ft (2,715.1 m^{2}) on a 4.97-acre (2.01 ha) site
267. Tampa Florida Temple (Under construction); Official website; News & images	
Location: Announced: Groundbreaking: Size: Notes:	Riverview, Florida; 3 April 2022 by Russell M. Nelson; 23 August 2025 by Neil L. Andersen; 29,000 sq ft (2,700 m^{2}) on a 12-acre (4.9 ha) site The location of this temple was originally announced on October 31, 2022. The subsequent relocation of this temple was announced on April 22, 2024.
274. Jacksonville Florida Temple (Under construction); Official website; News & images	
Location: Announced: Groundbreaking: Size:	Jacksonville, Florida; 2 October 2022 by Russell M. Nelson; 24 January 2026 by Massimo De Feo; 29,000 sq ft (2,700 m^{2}) on a 6.6-acre (2.7 ha) site

== See also ==
- The Church of Jesus Christ of Latter-day Saints membership statistics (United States)
- Religion in Florida
