= Bountiful Utah Temple =

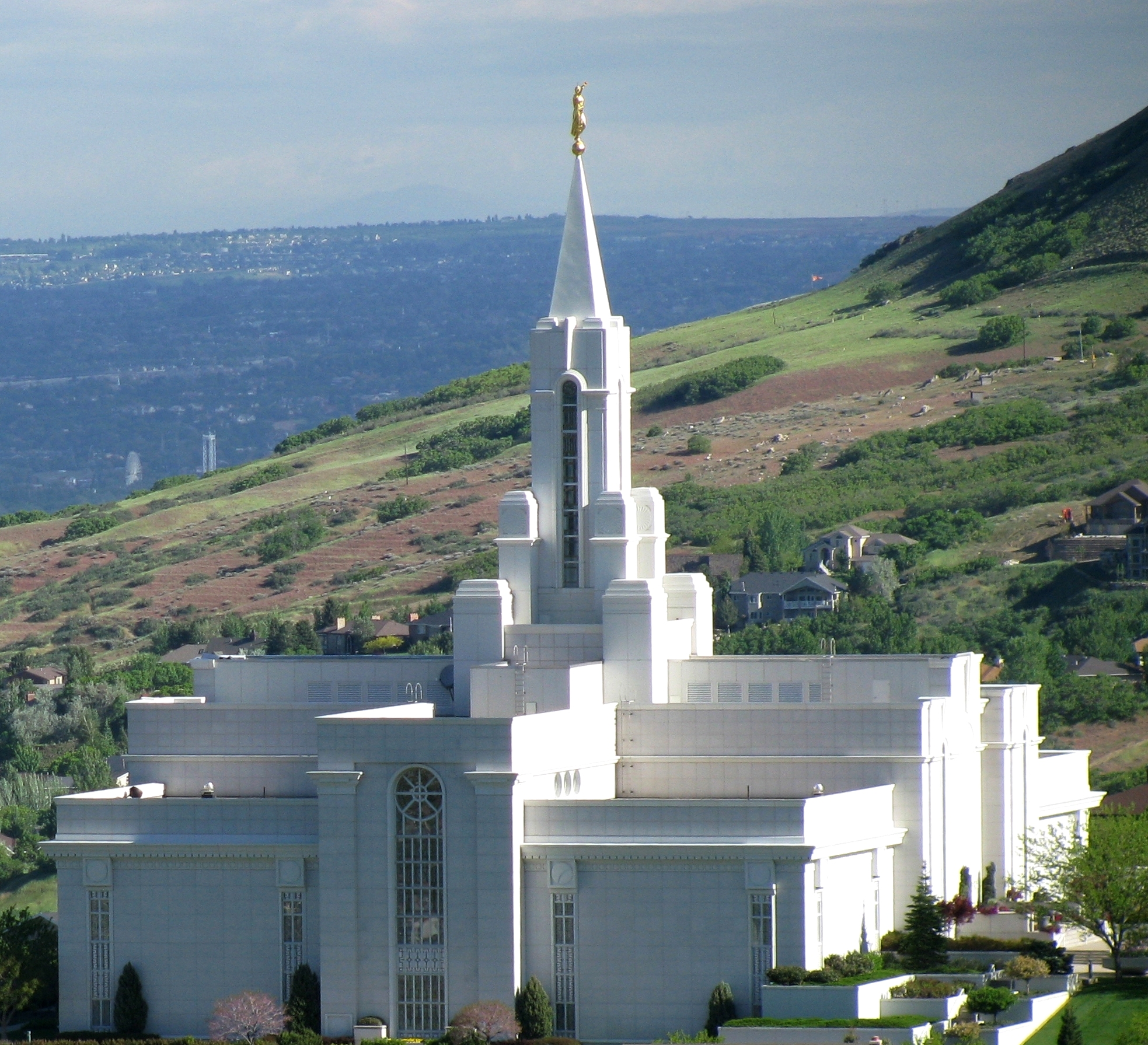
- Interactive map of Bountiful Utah Temple
- Number: 47
- Dedication: January 8, 1995, by Howard W. Hunter
- Site: 9 acres (3.6 ha)
- Floor area: 104,000 ft^{2} (9,700 m^{2})
- Height: 176 ft (54 m)
- Official website • News & images

Church chronology
← Orlando Florida Temple	Bountiful Utah Temple	→ Hong Kong China Temple

Additional information
- Announced: April 6, 1991, by Ezra Taft Benson
- Groundbreaking: May 2, 1992, by Ezra Taft Benson
- Open house: November 4 – December 17, 1994
- Current president: Melvyn K. Reeves
- Designed by: Allen B. Erekson
- Location: Bountiful, Utah, United States
- Coordinates: 40°52′58.27079″N 111°50′48.52319″W
- Exterior finish: Bethel white granite
- Design: Classic modern, single-spire design
- Baptistries: 1
- Ordinance rooms: 4 (stationary)
- Sealing rooms: 8
- Clothing rental: Yes

The Bountiful Utah Temple is a temple of the Church of Jesus Christ of Latter-day Saints located in Bountiful, Utah. The intent to build the temple was announced by church's First Presidency on May 28, 1988. It is the church's 47th operating temple, the first in Davis County, and the eighth in the state of Utah.

The temple has a single attached central spire with an angel Moroni statue and is 104,000 square feet (9,700 m^{2}). Designed by architect Allen Ereckson, the structure uses a modern design. A groundbreaking ceremony, to signify beginning of construction, was held on May 2, 1992, with church president Ezra Taft Benson presiding.

== History ==
The temple's history began in 1897, when John Haven Barlow Sr. purchased 40 acres (160,000 m^{2}) of land from the United States government. Because of lack of water and the steep terrain, little could be done with the land. In 1947, some of the land was cleared and four hundred apricot trees were planted. In the spring of 1983, flash flooding caused a great deal of damage in Bountiful, resulting in the decision to build a dam across the canyon to limit the flow of water during heavy rainstorms. The city requested the use of the soil from the future temple site, so construction crews removed over two hundred thousand cubic yards of soil, leaving the area on which the temple would later be built.

Plans to build the temple were announced by the First Presidency on May 28, 1988. Preliminary plans were for a four-story structure of more than 104,000 square feet. Four years later, on May 2, 1992, church president Ezra Taft Benson presided at the groundbreaking ceremony.

On January 8, 1995, church president Howard W. Hunter dedicated the temple. Two hundred thousand Latter-day Saints attended the dedicatory sessions, more than had ever previously attended a temple dedication.

Several challenges were faced during construction, including the removal of over 200,000 cubic yards of soil to prepare the steep terrain for building.

On May 22, 2016, lightning struck the top of the temple, damaging the angel Moroni statue, causing it to lose part of its head and back. The statue, made of fiberglass and covered in gold leaf, was replaced two weeks later.

The temple has four ordinance rooms and eight sealing rooms. It is the eighth in the state of Utah.

On November 4, 1994, the church announced the public open house that was held from November 4 to December 17, 1994 (excluding Sundays). Approximately 870,360 visitors toured the temple during the open house. The temple was dedicated by Howard W. Hunter on January 8, 1995, with 28 sessions held over the ensuing days. Like all the church's temples, it is not used for Sunday worship services. Dieter F. Uchtdorf has stated that a temple is "literally a house of the Lord." Once dedicated, only church members with a current temple recommend can enter for worship.

In 2020, like all the church's others, the Bountiful Utah Temple was temporarily closed in response to the COVID-19 pandemic.

== Design and architecture ==
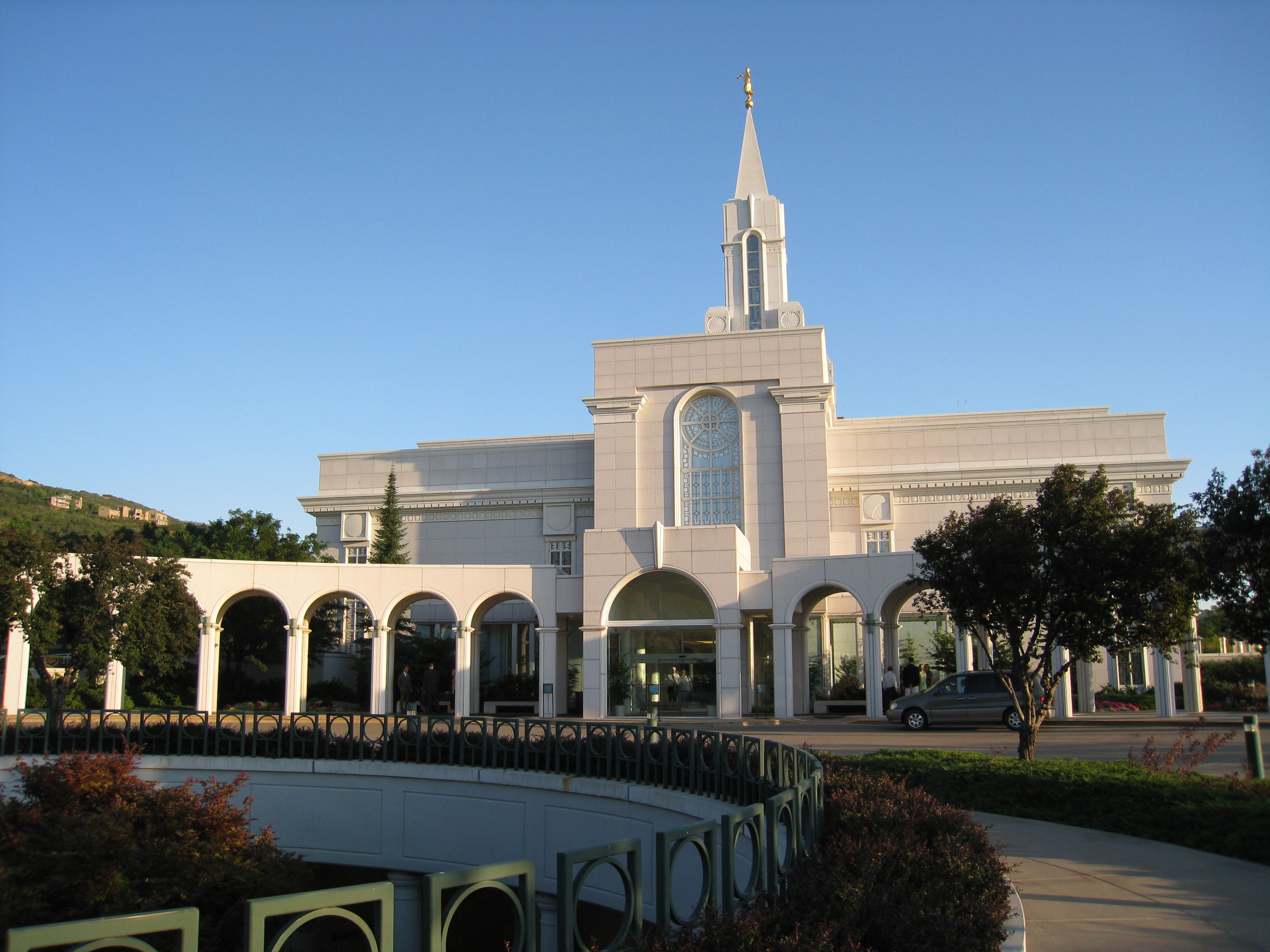
The Bountiful Utah Temple

Though not tied to a specific style of architecture, the building has a modern architectural style with a single spire and uses a traditional Latter-day Saint temple design. Designed by architect Allen Ereckson, its architecture uses both the cultural heritage of Bountiful and its spiritual significance to the church. A month before being dedicated, Bountiful's mayor gave the temple an award for beauty and as a landmark to the city.

The temple is on a 9-acre plot at 640 South Bountiful Boulevard, with surrounding landscaping including a circular columned atrium connecting the lower and main parking levels, along with walkways lined with columns and arches. These elements are intended to create a tranquil setting to enhance the site's sacred atmosphere.

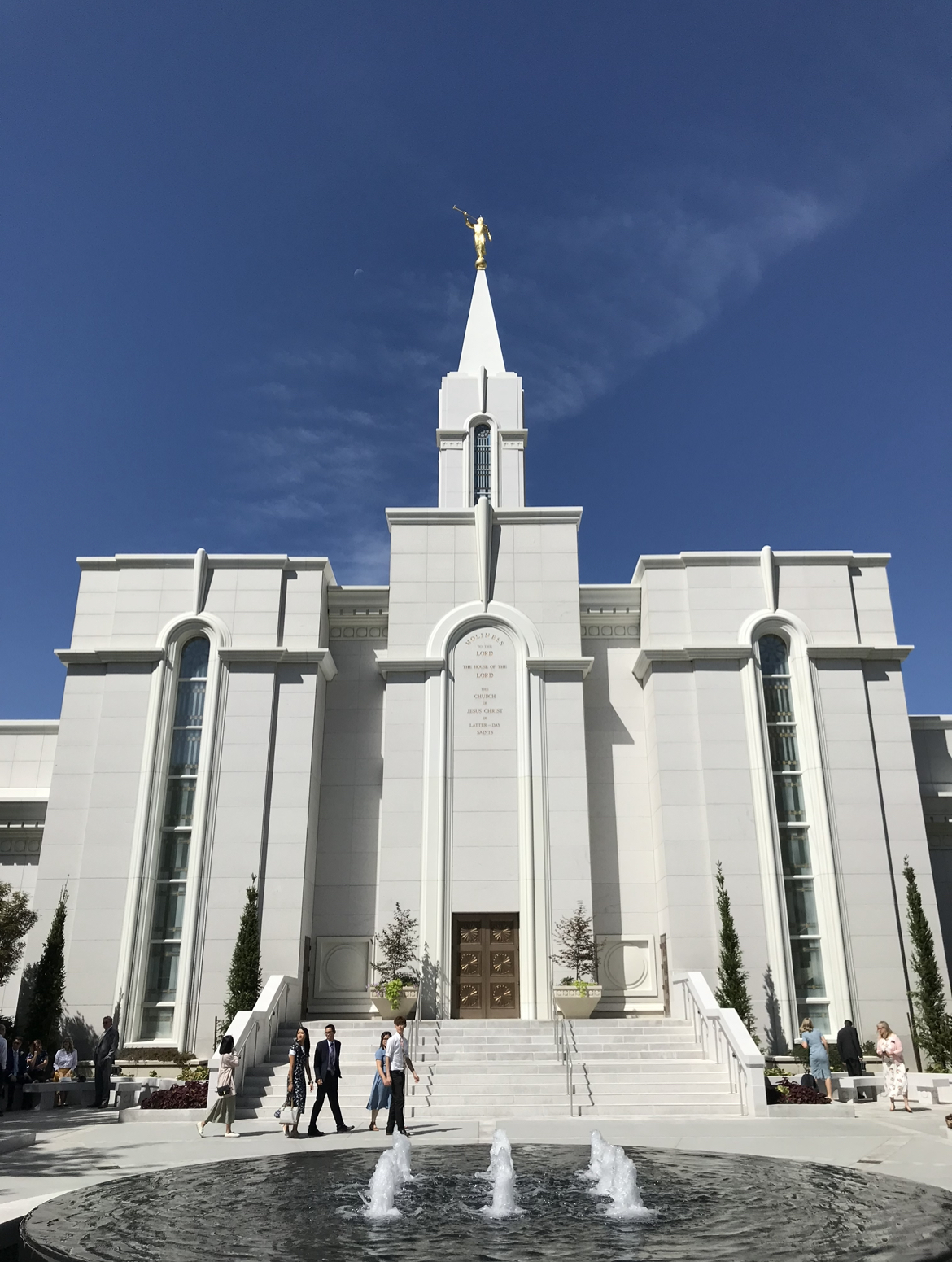
The rear of the Bountiful Utah Temple

The four-story structure is constructed with Bethel white granite, quarried near Sharon, Vermont. The exterior has a single central spire with a statue of the angel Moroni. While Moroni is not a figure of worship, the statue symbolizes the restoration of the gospel of Jesus Christ, while also being a lightning rod.

The interior design uses colors that progress from darker to lighter shades. The temple has four ordinance rooms and eight sealing rooms, each designed for ceremonial use.

== Presidents ==
The church's temples are directed by a temple president and matron, each serving for a term of three years. The president and matron oversee the administration of temple operations and provide guidance and training for both temple patrons and staff.

Serving from 1995 to 1998, the first president of the Bountiful Utah Temple was Harold C. Yancey, with Beverly Yancey serving as matron. As of 2025, the current president is David R. Webster (2024- ).

Notable presidents of the temple include James O. Mason (2000–03) and Robert H. Garff (2012–15).

== Admittance ==
On November 4, 1994, the church announced the public open house that was held from November 4 to December 17, 1994 (excluding Sundays). The temple was dedicated by church president Howard W. Hunter on January 8, 1995, with 28 total sessions held between the 8th and January 14. Like all the church's temples, it is not used for Sunday worship services. To members of the church, temples are regarded as sacred houses of the Lord. Once dedicated, only church members with a current temple recommend can enter for worship.

== See also ==
Temples in Utah
Wasatch Front Temples
Temples along the Wasatch Front
- = Operating
- = Under construction
- = Announced
- = Temporarily Closed

- The Church of Jesus Christ of Latter-day Saints in Utah
- Comparison of temples of The Church of Jesus Christ of Latter-day Saints
- List of temples of The Church of Jesus Christ of Latter-day Saints
- List of temples of The Church of Jesus Christ of Latter-day Saints by geographic region
- Temple architecture (Latter-day Saints)
