= Fort Lauderdale Florida Temple =

Temple of the LDS church

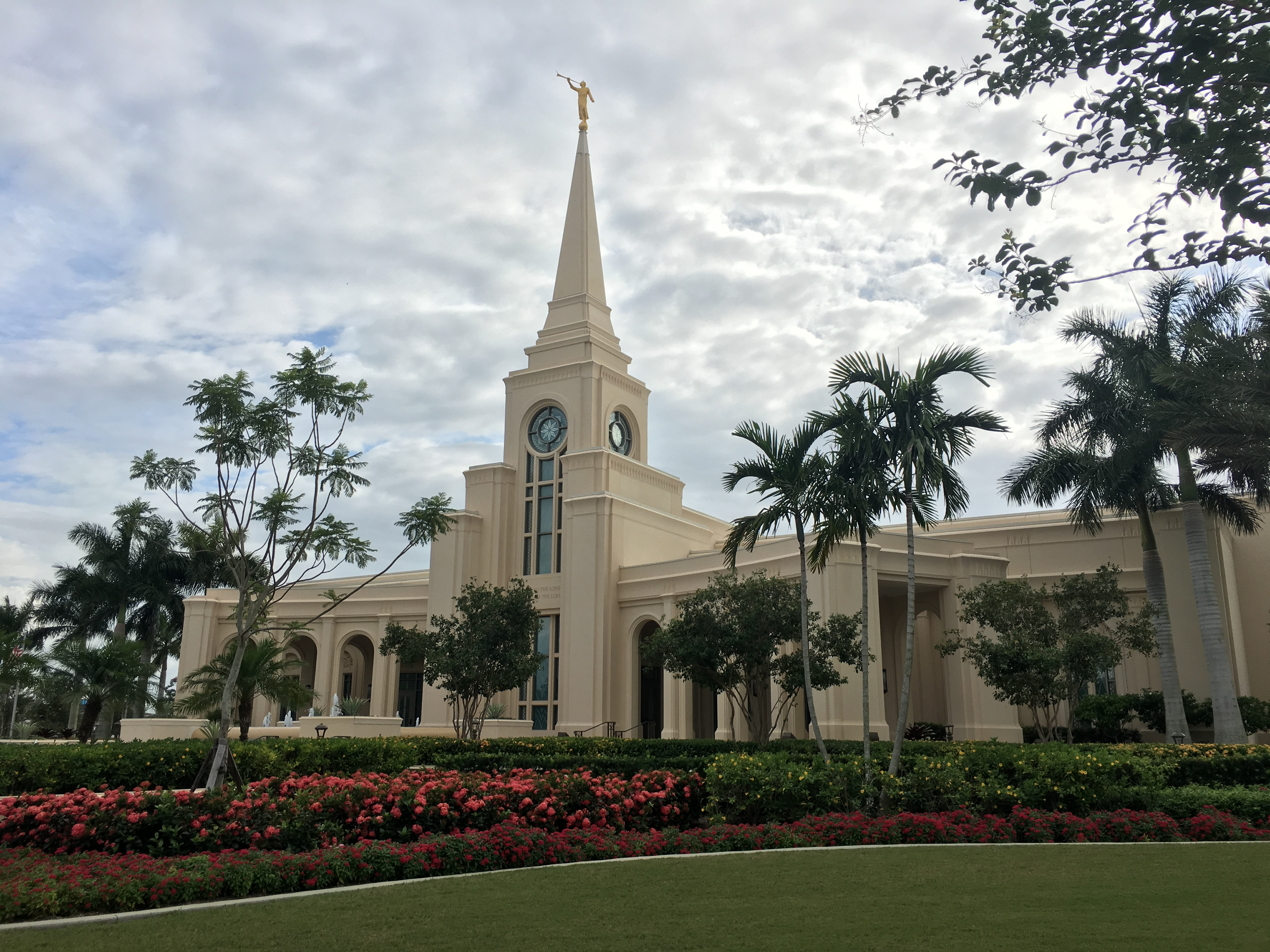
- Interactive map of Fort Lauderdale Florida Temple
- Number: 143
- Dedication: May 4, 2014, by Dieter F. Uchtdorf
- Site: 16.82 acres (6.81 ha)
- Floor area: 30,500 ft^{2} (2,830 m^{2})
- Height: 100 ft (30 m)
- Official website • News & images

Church chronology
← Gilbert Arizona Temple	Fort Lauderdale Florida Temple	→ Phoenix Arizona Temple

Additional information
- Announced: October 3, 2009, by Thomas S. Monson
- Groundbreaking: June 18, 2011, by Walter F. González
- Open house: March 29 – April 19, 2014
- Current president: Wayne Orson Whitaker
- Location: Davie, Florida, U.S.
- Coordinates: 26°4′21″N 80°21′22″W
- Exterior finish: Architectural precast concrete.
- Design: Classic modern, single-spire design
- Baptistries: 1
- Ordinance rooms: 2 (two-stage progressive)
- Sealing rooms: 3
- Notes: A public open house took place from March 29 to April 19, 2014.

The Fort Lauderdale Florida Temple is a temple of the Church of Jesus Christ of Latter-day Saints in Davie near Fort Lauderdale, Florida. It is the church's 143rd temple. The intent to build the temple was announced on October 3, 2009, by church president Thomas S. Monson, during general conference. The temple is the second in Florida, after the Orlando Florida Temple.

The temple has a single attached end spire with a statue of the angel Moroni. The temple was designed by the firm, Architectural Nexus, located in Salt Lake City, Utah. A groundbreaking ceremony, to signify the beginning of construction, was held on June 18, 2011, conducted by Walter F. Gonzalez, of the Presidency of the Seventy.

== History ==
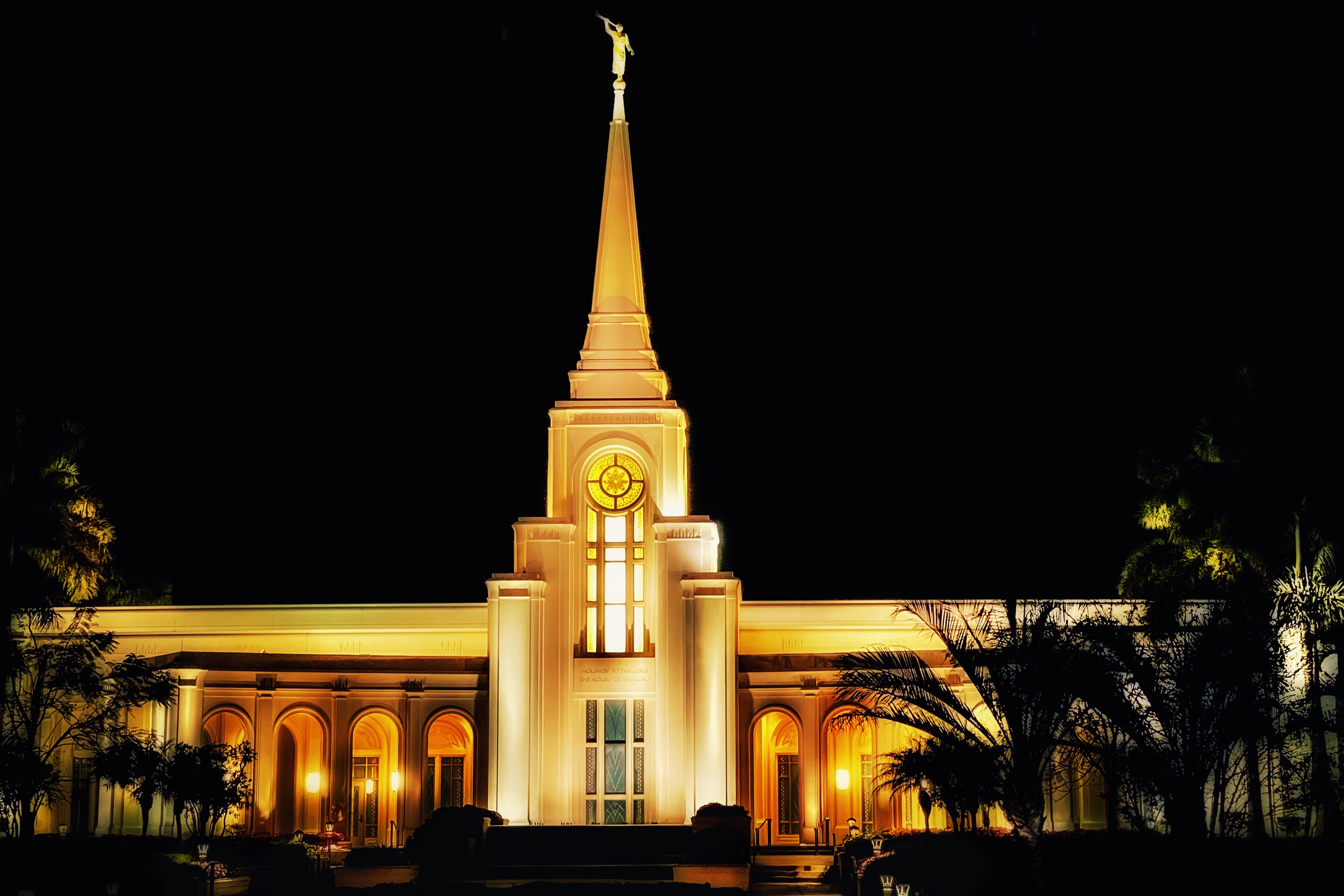
Fort Lauderdale Florida Temple at night

The announcement of a temple in south Florida was made by church president Thomas S. Monson on October 3, 2009, during general conference. It was announced concurrently with the Brigham City Utah, Concepción Chile, Fortaleza Brazil and Sapporo Japan temples. It is the second temple in Florida and the first in the heavily populated southern part of the state. The state's other temple, in Orlando, was completed in 1994.

Subsequent to the announcement, a local church official indicated that the temple would likely be constructed somewhere in western Broward County, rather than within the city of Fort Lauderdale itself. No specific location was disclosed.

Ground was broken on June 18, 2011, by Walter F. Gonzalez. After construction was completed, a public open house was held from March 29 to April 19, 2014. The temple was dedicated on May 4, 2014, by Dieter F. Uchtdorf of the church's First Presidency. The temple is designed to serve an estimated 25,000 church members in South Florida.

The temple was given a 2014 South-East Engineering Award for best built building. In 2020, like all the church's others, the Fort Lauderdale Florida Temple was closed for a time in response to the COVID-19 pandemic.

== Design and architecture ==
The building has a Neoclassical-inspired architectural style, coupled with traditional Latter-day Saint temple design. Designed by Architectural Nexus, its architecture reflects both the cultural heritage of the Fort Lauderdale area and its spiritual significance to the church.

The temple is on a 16.82-acre plot, and the surrounding landscaping has fountains and a reflection pool, as well as palm trees, flowers, and shrubs. These elements are designed to provide a tranquil setting that enhances the sacred atmosphere of the site.

The structure stands almost 100 feet tall, and is constructed with precast architectural panels. The exterior has “a series of arches that lead to the main entrance.”

The interior has art glass and murals, centered around a motif of long grass leaf in a color palette of blue, green, and earth tones. The temple includes two instruction rooms, three sealing rooms, and a baptistry, each designed for ceremonial use.

The design has symbolic elements representing Florida’s natural landscape to provide deeper spiritual meaning to the temple's appearance and function. Symbolism is important to church members and includes the temple’s blue, green, and earth-toned color palette, which was intended to “reflect the tropical area.”

== Temple presidents ==
The church's temples are directed by a temple president and matron, each serving for a term of three years. The president and matron oversee the administration of temple operations and provide guidance and training for both temple patrons and staff.

Serving from 2017 to 2017, the first president of the Fort Lauderdale Florida Temple was Jerry R. Boggess, with the matron being Portia S. Boggess. As of 2024, Andy H. Lustig is the president, with Gay M. Lustig serving as matron.

== Admittance ==
On January 13, 2014, the church announced the public open house that was held from March 29-April 19, 2014 (excluding Sundays). The temple was dedicated by Dieter F. Uchtdorf on May 4, 2014, in three sessions.

Like all the church's temples, it is not used for Sunday worship services. To members of the church, temples are regarded as sacred houses of the Lord. Once dedicated, only church members with a current temple recommend can enter for worship.

== See also ==
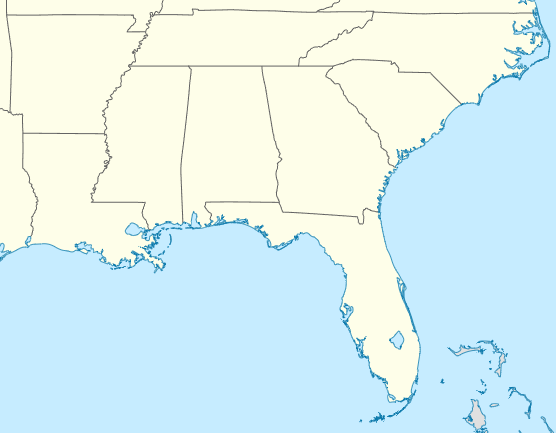
Temples in the Southeastern United States
- = Operating
- = Under construction
- = Announced
- = Temporarily Closed
- Comparison of temples of The Church of Jesus Christ of Latter-day Saints
- List of temples of The Church of Jesus Christ of Latter-day Saints
- List of temples of The Church of Jesus Christ of Latter-day Saints by geographic region
- Temple architecture (Latter-day Saints)
- The Church of Jesus Christ of Latter-day Saints in Florida
