= David B. Haight =

American religious leader (1906-2004)

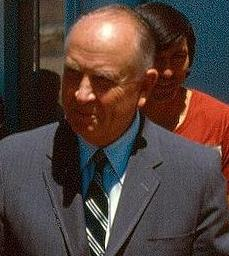

Quorum of the Twelve Apostles
- January 8, 1976 – July 31, 2004

LDS Church Apostle
- January 8, 1976 – July 31, 2004
- Reason: Death of Hugh B. Brown
- Reorganization at end of term: Dieter F. Uchtdorf and David A. Bednar were ordained following the deaths of Haight and Neal A. Maxwell

Assistant to the Quorum of the Twelve Apostles
- April 6, 1970 – January 8, 1976
- End reason: Called to the Quorum of the Twelve Apostles

Mayor of Palo Alto, California
- 1959 – 1963
- Predecessor: Noel E. Porter
- Successor: Edward Arnold

Personal details
- Born: David Bruce Haight; September 2, 1906; Oakley, Idaho, U.S.
- Died: July 31, 2004 (aged 97); Salt Lake City, Utah, U.S.
- Resting place: Wasatch Lawn Memorial Park; 40°41′52.08″N 111°50′30.12″W
- Spouse(s): Ruby M. Olson
- Parents: Hector C. Haight; Clara J. Tuttle
- Signature
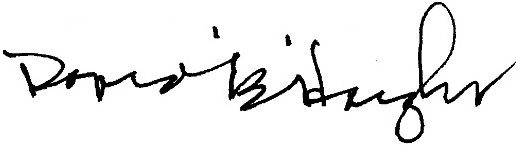

David Bruce Haight (September 2, 1906 – July 31, 2004) was an American religious leader and an elected official. Haight was the second oldest member of the Quorum of the Twelve Apostles in the history of the Church of Jesus Christ of Latter-day Saints (LDS Church). He also served as mayor of Palo Alto, California from 1959 to 1963.

== Early life and education ==
Haight was born in Oakley, Idaho, on September 2, 1906, the son of Hector Caleb Haight and Clara Josephine Tuttle. Hector was the son of Horton D. Haight, who had been involved in many trips in the Mormon trek and served as the first president of the LDS Church stake that included Oakley. David's maternal grandfather, Norton Ray Tuttle, was the first bishop of Tooele, Utah.

Haight received a degree from Utah State University where he was initiated into the Gamma Epsilon chapter of the Pi Kappa Alpha fraternity, and he served as a commander in the Navy during World War II.

== Career ==
Haight was an executive in the retail business.

Haight served as mayor of Palo Alto, California from 1959 to 1963, and was the owner of the Palo Alto Hardware store.

== LDS Church service ==
When he was called as president of the LDS Church's mission in Scotland he resigned as mayor of Palo Alto, over the objections of the city council. In addition to his service as mission president, he served in the church as president of the Palo Alto Stake and a regional representative. He was called as a general authority, as an Assistant to the Quorum of the Twelve Apostles, in April 1970. He also served as a special assistant to the president of Brigham Young University.

The vacancy in the church's Quorum of the Twelve, from the death of Hugh B. Brown in December 1975, was filled by Haight. He was ordained an apostle on January 8, 1976.

Haight died the morning of July 31, 2004, of causes incident to age, having attended the funeral of his Quorum of the Twelve colleague, Neal A. Maxwell, four days earlier. Dieter F. Uchtdorf and David A. Bednar were called to fill the vacancies created by the deaths of Maxwell and Haight. Haight's funeral service was held in the Salt Lake Tabernacle and he was interred at Wasatch Lawn Memorial Park Cemetery in Holladay, Utah. At 97 years old, he was the oldest apostle in church history until being surpassed by Russell M. Nelson in 2022.

== Personal life ==
Haight was married to Ruby M. Olson (1910–2004). He was the father-in-law of businessman and philanthropist Jon Huntsman Sr., through Haight's daughter, Karen, and grandfather of the former governor of Utah and former U.S. Ambassador to China and Russia, Jon Huntsman Jr.

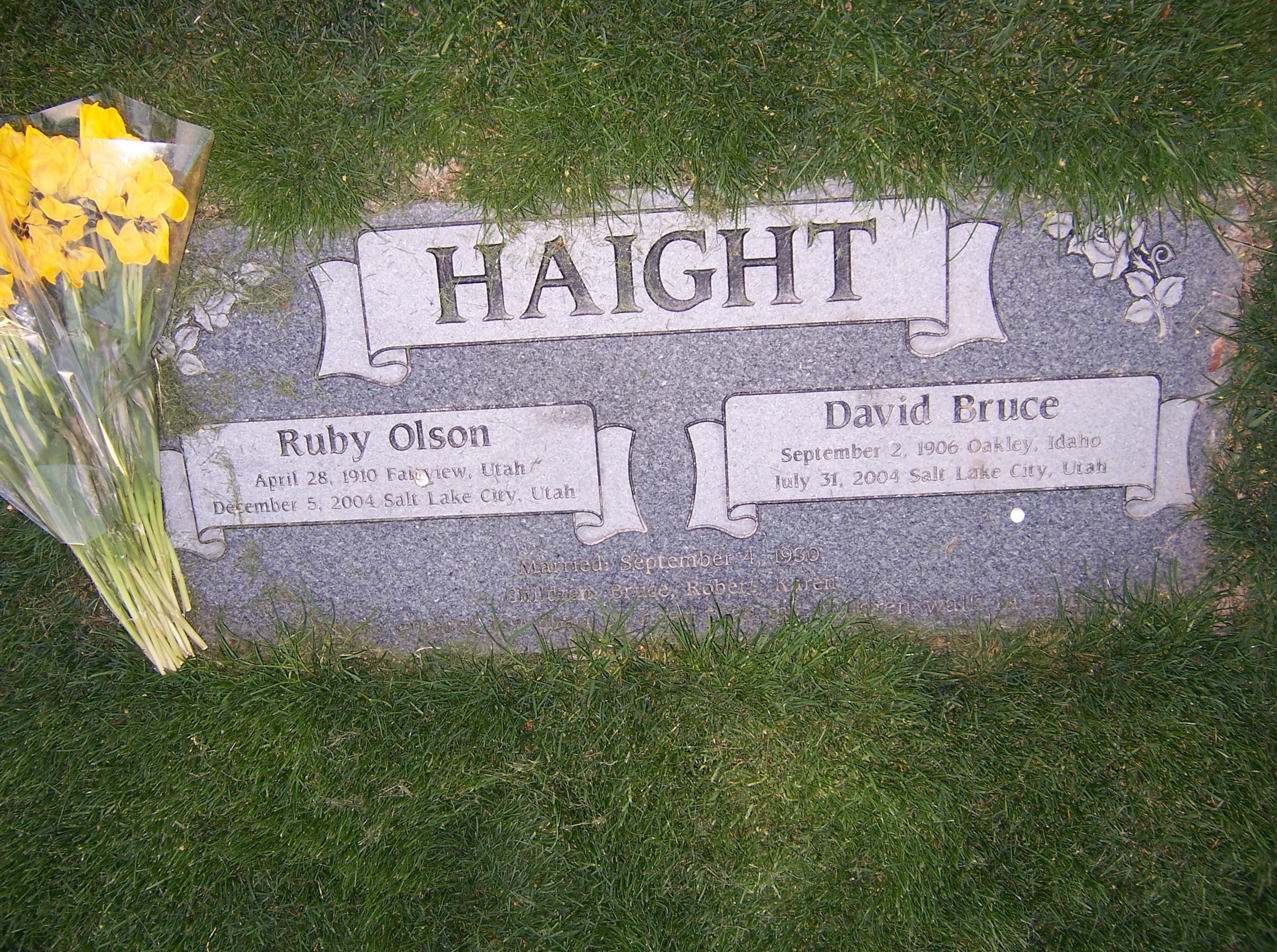
David B. Haight's grave marker

The Church of Jesus Christ of Latter-day Saints titles
Preceded by L. Tom Perry	Quorum of the Twelve Apostles; January 8, 1976 – July 31, 2004	Succeeded by James E. Faust
