= Neal A. Maxwell =

American scholar, educator, and religious leader (1926–2004)

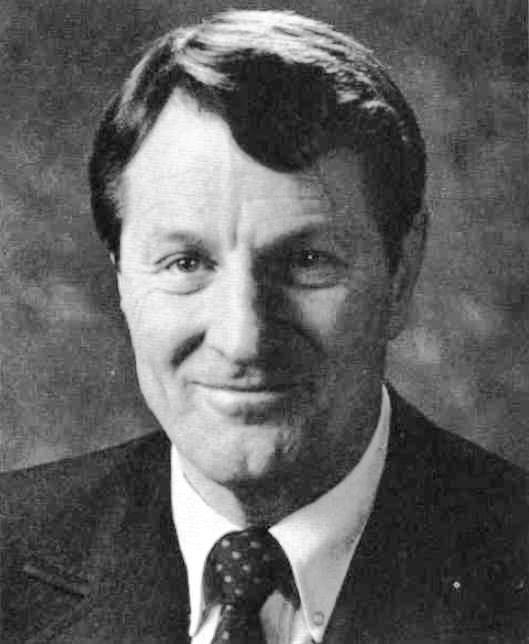

Quorum of the Twelve Apostles
- July 23, 1981 – July 21, 2004
- Called by: Spencer W. Kimball

LDS Church Apostle
- July 23, 1981 – July 21, 2004
- Called by: Spencer W. Kimball
- Reason: Gordon B. Hinckley added to First Presidency
- Reorganization at end of term: Dieter F. Uchtdorf and David A. Bednar were ordained following the deaths of Maxwell and David B. Haight

Presidency of the First Quorum of the Seventy
- October 1, 1976 – July 23, 1981
- Called by: Spencer W. Kimball
- End reason: Called to the Quorum of the Twelve Apostles

First Quorum of the Seventy
- October 1, 1976 – July 23, 1981
- Called by: Spencer W. Kimball
- End reason: Called to the Quorum of the Twelve Apostles

Assistant to the Quorum of the Twelve Apostles
- April 6, 1974 – October 1, 1976
- Called by: Spencer W. Kimball
- End reason: Position abolished

Personal details
- Born: Neal Ash Maxwell; July 6, 1926; Salt Lake City, Utah, U.S.
- Died: July 21, 2004 (aged 78); Salt Lake City, Utah, U.S.
- Resting place: 40°46′37.92″N 111°51′28.8″W
- Education: University of Utah (BA, MA)
- Signature
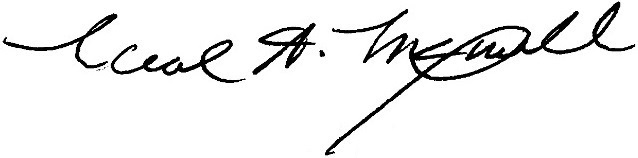

Neal Ash Maxwell (July 6, 1926 – July 21, 2004) was an American scholar, educator, and religious leader who served as a member of the Quorum of the Twelve Apostles of the Church of Jesus Christ of Latter-day Saints (LDS Church) from 1981 until his death in 2004.

== Life and career ==
Maxwell was born on July 6, 1926, in Salt Lake City, Utah, to Clarence Maxwell and Emma Ash. After graduating from Granite High School in 1944 at the height of World War II, Maxwell enlisted in the United States Army. He served in the 77th Division and saw action in the Battle of Okinawa. After the war, Maxwell served for two years as an LDS Church missionary in Canada.

While pursuing an undergraduate education at the University of Utah before leaving on his mission, Maxwell met Colleen Hinckley (1928–2016). After Maxwell returned from his mission, he resumed courting Colleen, and they were married in the Salt Lake Temple on November 22, 1950. They became the parents of four children and had twenty-four grandchildren.

Maxwell earned bachelor's and master's degrees in political science from the University of Utah. From 1952 to 1956 he worked in Washington, D.C. for the government and then as a legislative assistant to Senator Wallace F. Bennett.

Maxwell was a professor of political science at the University of Utah. He also held many administrative roles at the university. He first joined the university staff as assistant director of public relations in 1956. In 1958, he became Assistant to the President. In 1961, he was secretary to the Board of Trustees, followed by dean of students in 1962, and later vice president for planning and public affairs. In 1967, he became Executive Vice-president of the University of Utah.

== LDS Church service ==
From 1959 to 1962, Maxwell served as bishop of Salt Lake City's University Sixth Ward. He was a member of the General Board of the YMMIA and a member of the Adult Correlation Committee for the next five years.

In 1967, Maxwell was called to be one of the first 69 regional representatives. From 1970 to 1976, he served as the tenth Commissioner of Church Education overseeing the Church Educational System. Under his direction, the system received its current name.

Maxwell began serving as an LDS general authority in 1974, when he was called as an Assistant to the Quorum of the Twelve Apostles. In 1976, Maxwell became one of the seven presidents of the seventy, when the calling of Assistant to the Twelve was eliminated.

Maxwell was ordained an apostle by N. Eldon Tanner on July 23, 1981, after Gordon B. Hinckley became a counselor in the First Presidency. He was sustained a member of the Quorum of the Twelve Apostles on October 3, 1981.

Among his assignments was to preside over the organization of new stakes of the church. One of the more notable was the Aba Nigeria Stake in 1988, with David W. Eka called as president. This was the first stake in the church staffed entirely by people of African descent.

Maxwell wrote approximately 30 books concerning religion and authored numerous articles on politics and government for local, professional and national publications. He was well known for his extensive vocabulary and elegant style of speaking and writing. His highly alliterative talks have always presented a great challenge to translators. During one LDS general conference, the translators had categorized each of the talks to be given into five levels of difficulty. All of the talks were assigned to levels one to four, except Maxwell's. His talk was alone at level five. Commenting on his speaking and writing styles at Maxwell's funeral, church president Gordon B. Hinckley said,

I know of no other man who spoke in such an interesting and distinct manner. His genius was the product of diligence. He was a perfectionist determined to exact from every phrase and sentence vivid imagery that brought the gospel to life. Each talk was a masterpiece, each book was a work of art. I think we shall not see one like him again.

Maxwell received an Honorary Doctor of Laws degree from the University of Utah; an Honorary Doctor of Letters degree from Westminster College, Salt Lake City; an Honorary Doctor of Laws degree from Brigham Young University (BYU), Provo, Utah; an Honorary Doctor of Humanities degree from Utah State University, Logan, Utah; an Honorary Degree from Ricks College, Rexburg, Idaho; and an Honorary Degree from Salt Lake Community College.

The University of Utah established the Neal A. Maxwell Presidential Endowed Chair in Political Theory, Public Policy and Public Service in the fall of 1998.

Maxwell's business career included serving as a director of several business firms, including Questar Corporation, Questar Pipeline, and Deseret News Publishing Company. He also was active in public service, including service as chairman of the Utah Constitutional Revision Commission.

Maxwell received the Liberty Bell award from the Utah State Bar in 1967 for public service. In 1973, the Institute of Government Service at BYU named him Public Administrator of the Year.

== Death ==
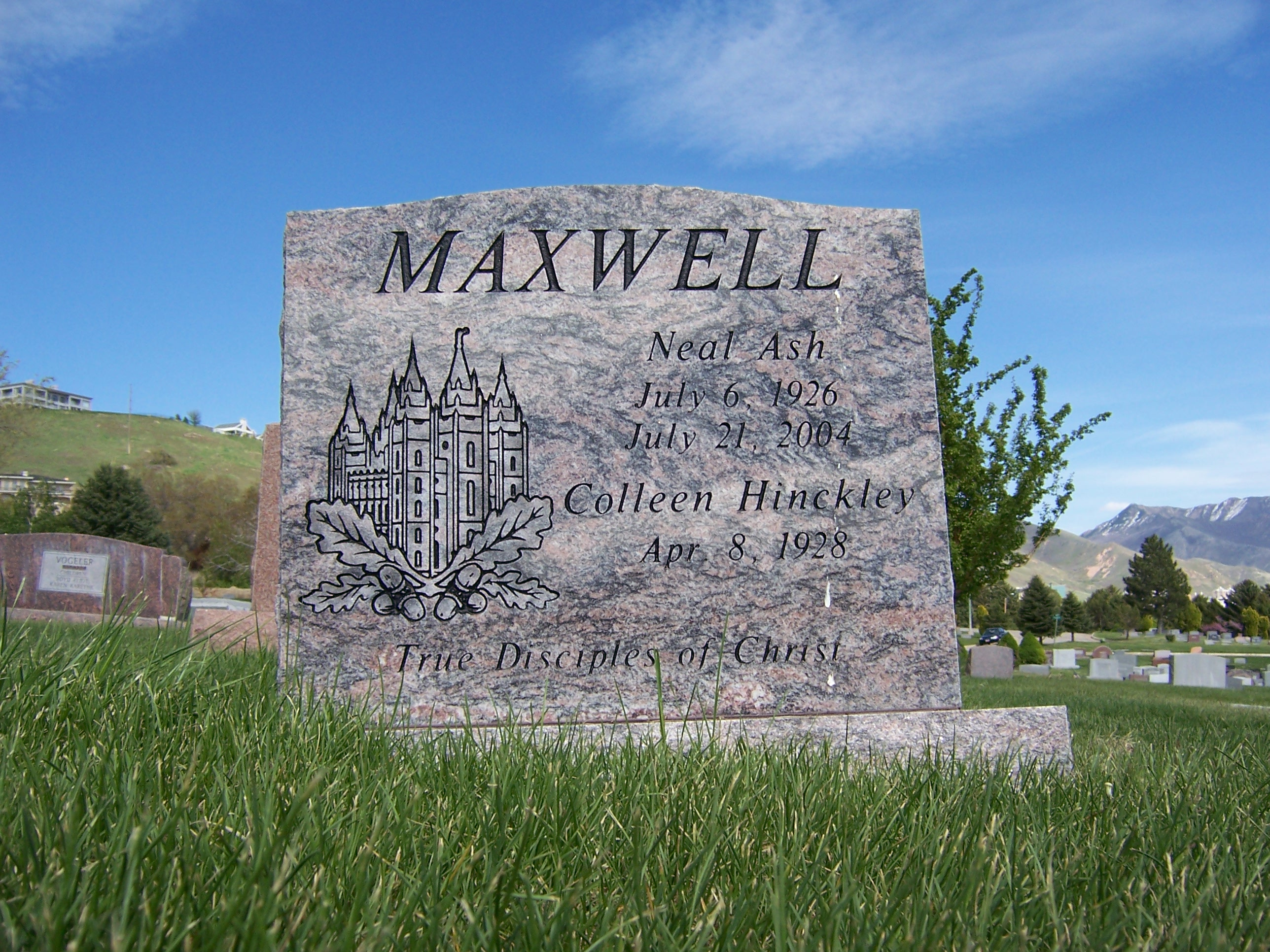
Maxwell's grave marker.

Maxwell died in Salt Lake City, from leukemia. He was originally diagnosed with leukemia in 1996, eight years before his death.

An estimated 4,000 people attended the funeral in the Tabernacle or via video in the Salt Lake Assembly Hall or the Joseph Smith Memorial Building. He was buried at Salt Lake City Cemetery. According to Hinckley, Maxwell "accomplished more in these last eight years than most men do in a lifetime." With the death ten days later of fellow apostle David B. Haight, the vacancies created in the Quorum of the Twelve were filled by Dieter F. Uchtdorf and David A. Bednar.

Maxwell was survived by his wife, Colleen, four children, 24 grandchildren, and two great-grandchildren.

The BYU Institute for the Study and Preservation of Ancient Religious Texts was renamed the Neal A. Maxwell Institute for Religious Scholarship after Maxwell's death.

== Publications ==
- Maxwell, Neal A. (1967). ... A More Excellent Way: Essays on Leadership for Latter-day Saints. Deseret Book Company. OCLC 885816.
- —— (1970). "For the power is in them ..." Mormon Musings. Deseret Book Company. ISBN 0-87747-432-X.
- —— (1972). A time to Choose. Deseret Book Company. ISBN 0-87747-482-6.
- —— (1973). The Smallest Part. Deseret Book Company. ISBN 0-87747-505-9.
- —— (1974). That My Family Should Partake. Deseret Book Company. ISBN 0-87747-538-5.
- —— (1975). Of One Heart: The Glory of the City of Enoch. Deseret Book Company. ISBN 0-87747-604-7. Republished 1981, ISBN 0-87747-298-X. Republished again as Maxwell, Neal A. (2006). The Enoch Letters. Deseret Book. ISBN 1-59038-647-7.
- —— (1976). Deposition of a Disciple. Deseret Book Company. OCLC 2984580.
- —— (1977). Wherefore, Ye Must Press Forward. Deseret Book Company. ISBN 0-87747-685-3.
- —— (1978). Things as They Really Are. Deseret Book Company. ISBN 0-87747-730-2.
- —— (1979). All These Things Shall Give Thee Experience. Deseret Book Company. ISBN 0-87579-613-3.
- —— (1981). Notwithstanding My Weakness. Deseret Book Company. ISBN 0-87747-855-4.
- —— (1982). We Will Prove Them Herewith. Deseret Book Company. ISBN 0-87747-912-7.
- —— (1983). Plain and Precious Things. Deseret Book Company. ISBN 0-87747-979-8.
- —— (1984). We Talk of Christ, We Rejoice in Christ. Deseret Book Company. ISBN 0-87747-762-0.
- —— (1985). Sermons Not Spoken. Bookcraft Publications. ISBN 0-88494-571-5.
- —— (1986). But For a Small Moment. Bookcraft Publications. ISBN 0-88494-585-5.
- —— (1987). Meek and Lowly. Deseret Book Company. ISBN 0-87579-071-2.
- —— (1990). Wonderful Flood of Light. Bookcraft Publications. ISBN 0-88494-728-9.
- —— (1990). Of One Heart - Look Back At Sodom. Deseret Book. ISBN 978-0875794204.
- —— (1991). Men and Women of Christ. Bookcraft Publications. ISBN 0-88494-785-8.
- —— (1991). Even as I Am. Deseret Book Company. ISBN 0-87579-499-8.
- —— (1992). That Ye May Believe. Bookcraft Publications. ISBN 0-88494-843-9.
- —— (1994). Lord, Increase Our Faith. Bookcraft Publications. ISBN 0-88494-919-2. Republished 1998, ISBN 1-57008-583-8 (paperback)
- —— (1997). Women of Faith. Deseret Book Company. ISBN 1-57345-259-9.
- —— (2000). The Collected Works of Neal A. Maxwell. Eagle Gate Publishers. ISBN 1-57345-896-1.
- —— (2001). Neal A. Maxwell Quote Book. Bookcraft Publications. ISBN 1-57008-325-8.
- —— (2001). The Promise of Discipleship. Deseret Book Company. ISBN 1-57345-983-6.
- —— (2002). If Thou Endure It Well. Bookcraft Publications. ISBN 1-57008-233-2.
- —— (2002). Not My Will, but Thine. Deseret Book Company. ISBN 0-88494-672-X.
- —— (2002). One More Strain of Praise. Deseret Book Company. ISBN 1-57008-679-6.
- —— (2003). The Precious Promise: A Message for Women. Deseret Book Company. ISBN 1-59038-167-X.
- —— (2003). Whom the Lord Loveth: The Journey of Discipleship. Deseret Book Company. ISBN 1-59038-206-4.
- —— (2004). Moving In His Majesty And Power. Deseret Book Company. ISBN 1-59038-393-1.

The Church of Jesus Christ of Latter-day Saints titles
Preceded by James E. Faust	Quorum of the Twelve Apostles; July 23, 1981 – July 21, 2004	Succeeded by Russell M. Nelson
