= Horton D. Haight =

American politician

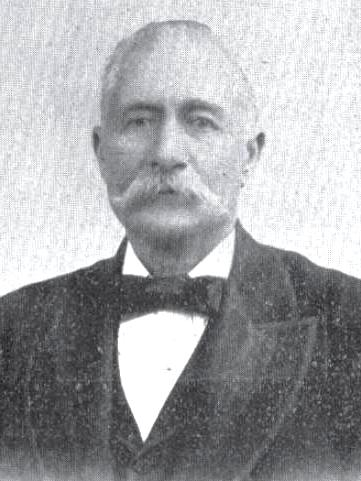

Member of the Utah Territorial House of Representatives for Davis County

In office
- August 6, 1860 – January 18, 1861

In office
- August 1, 1864 – January 21, 1865

Personal details
- Born: Horton David Haight; June 20, 1832; Moravia, New York, United States
- Died: January 19, 1900 (aged 67); Oakley, Idaho, United States
- Resting place: Oakley Cemetery; 42.2327°N 113.8742°W
- Occupation: Sheriff
- Employer: Davis County
- Spouse(s): Louise (née Leavitt) Haight
- Parents: Hector Caleb Haight; Julia Ann (née Van Orden)

Horton David Haight (June 20, 1832 – January 19, 1900) was a Mormon pioneer. He first came to Utah at age 14 in 1847 as a member of Daniel Spencer's immigrant company. He was in charge of a freight company that came to Utah Territory in 1859 and led four down-and-back companies in the 1860s. These companies involved wagons and teams sent out from Utah to bring back new emigrants, their baggage, and their freight on the return trip.

== Life and career ==
Haight was born in Moravia, Cayuga County, New York. He was the son of Hector Caleb Haight and his wife, Julia Ann (née Van Orden). The family moved to Illinois in 1837 and joined the Church of Jesus Christ of Latter-day Saints (LDS Church) in 1845, moving to Nauvoo. He was in the company sent to aid the Latter-day Saints on the trail in coming into Salt Lake City in 1848. In 1857, he served with Lot Smith in delaying the approach of Johnston's Army.

Haight lived for many years in Farmington, Utah. His wife Louise (née Leavitt) Haight was a counselor to Aurelia Spencer Rogers in the first Primary, which was organized in Farmington. Louise Haight also came from a family who had ties to the LDS church. Her father was Weare Leavitt, born at Grantham, New Hampshire, and his wife Phoebe (née Cowles) Leavitt of Claremont, New Hampshire.

Haight served as Davis County sheriff and in the Utah territorial legislature in 1861.

In 1882, he was sent to Oakley, Idaho by John Taylor, the president of the LDS Church. Haight served there as a bishop until 1887 and then became president of the newly formed Cassia Stake. He served as stake president until his death in 1900. Haight also served as a county commissioner in Cassia County, Idaho.

One of Haight's grandsons was David B. Haight, who became an apostle in the LDS Church.
