= Orlando Florida Temple =

Temple of the LDS Church

- Closed for renovation
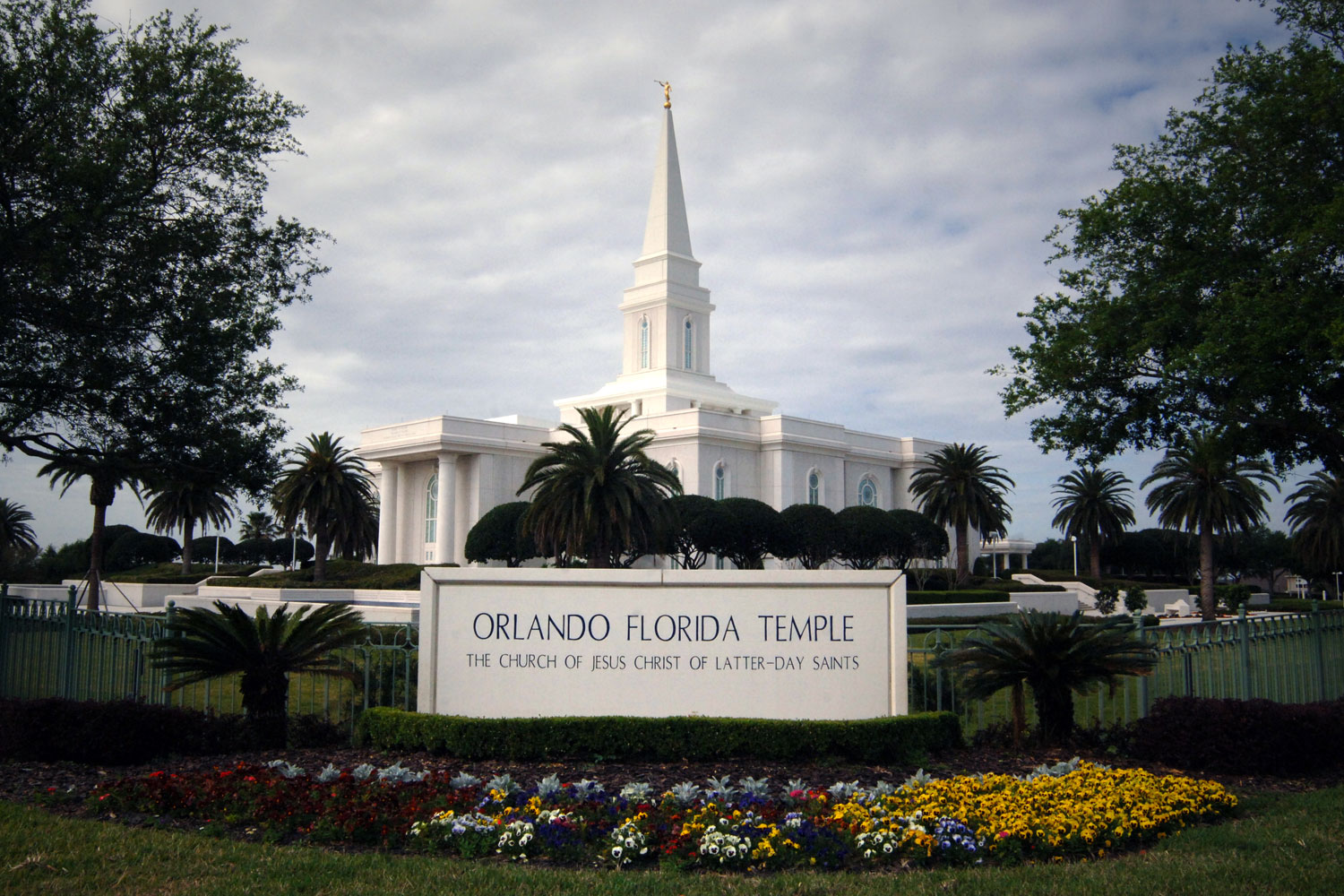
- Interactive map of Orlando Florida Temple
- Number: 46
- Dedication: October 9, 1994, by Howard W. Hunter
- Site: 13 acres (5.3 ha)
- Floor area: 70,000 ft^{2} (6,500 m^{2})
- Height: 165 ft (50 m)
- Official website • News & images

Church chronology
← San Diego California Temple	Orlando Florida Temple	→ Bountiful Utah Temple

Additional information
- Announced: April 6, 1991, by Ezra Taft Benson
- Groundbreaking: June 20, 1992, by James E. Faust
- Open house: September 10–30, 1994
- Current president: Boyd P. Hoglund
- Designed by: Scott Partnership Architects
- Location: Windermere, Florida, United States
- Coordinates: 28°30′26.5″N 81°30′34.1″W
- Exterior finish: White precast concrete with marble chips
- Design: Classic modern, single-spire design
- Baptistries: 1
- Ordinance rooms: 4 (stationary)
- Sealing rooms: 5
- Clothing rental: Yes

The Orlando Florida Temple is the 48th constructed and 46th operating temple of the Church of Jesus Christ of Latter-day Saints (LDS Church), and was the first to be built in Florida. Located near Windermere, Florida, it was built with a modern single-spire design. It is the second largest LDS temple in the Eastern United States, after the Washington D.C. Temple. The intent to build the temple was announced on February 17, 1990.

== History ==
The intent to construct the temple was announced on February 17, 1990, with a groundbreaking on June 20, 1992, conducted by James E. Faust. The temple was dedicated on October 9, 1994, by church president Howard W. Hunter. Orlando is one of two temples dedicated by Hunter, the other is the Bountiful Utah Temple. The temple was built on a 13-acre (53,000 m^{2}) plot, has four ordinance rooms and five sealing rooms, and has a total floor area of 70,000 square feet (6,500 m^{2}).

In 2020, like all the others in the church, the Orlando Florida Temple was closed for a time in response to the COVID-19 pandemic.

On February 12, 2024, the church announced that the temple would close for renovations. The temple closed on July 1, 2024, and is anticipated to reopen in June 2026.

== Design and architecture ==
The building has a traditional Latter-day Saint temple design. The temple sits on a 13-acre plot, and the landscaping around the temple includes water features, palm trees, and shrubs. These elements are designed to provide a tranquil setting that enhances the sacred atmosphere of the site. The Orlando Florida Temple closed for renovations on July 1, 2024, and is expected to reopen in June 2026.

=== Exterior and interior ===
The structure is constructed with white precast concrete with marble chips. The exterior has a tower that tops the building, and tall, arched windows around it. The temple includes a baptistry, a celestial room, four ordinance rooms, and five sealing rooms, each arranged for ceremonial use.

== Temple presidents ==
The church's temples are directed by a temple president and matron, each serving for a term of three years. The president and matron oversee the administration of temple operations and provide guidance and training for both temple patrons and staff.

The first president of the Orlando Florida Temple was Jack F. Joyner, with the matron being Margaret E. Joyner. They served from 1994 to 1997. Prior to the temple's closing for renovation in July 2024, Brent R. Holladay was the president, with Dana Holladay serving as matron.

== Admittance ==
Following the completion of the temple, a public open house was held from September 10-30, 1994 (excluding Sundays). During the open house, over 90,000 people toured the temple. The temple was dedicated by Howard W. Hunter in 12 sessions from October 9-11, 1994. Like all the church's temples, it is not used for Sunday worship services. To members of the church, temples are regarded as sacred houses of the Lord. Once dedicated, only church members with a current temple recommend can enter for worship.

== Gallery ==
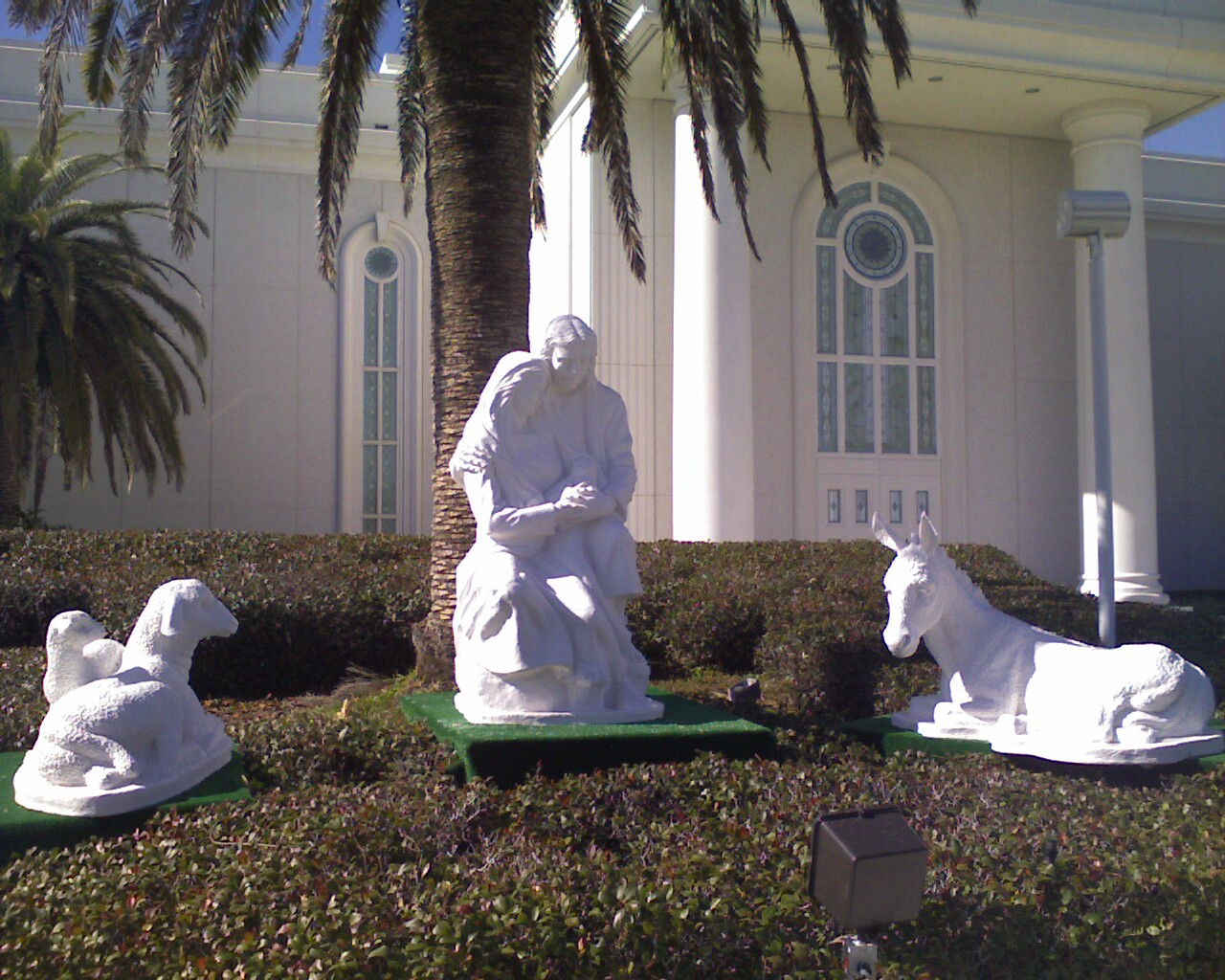
Nativity displayed on the temple grounds, December 2008

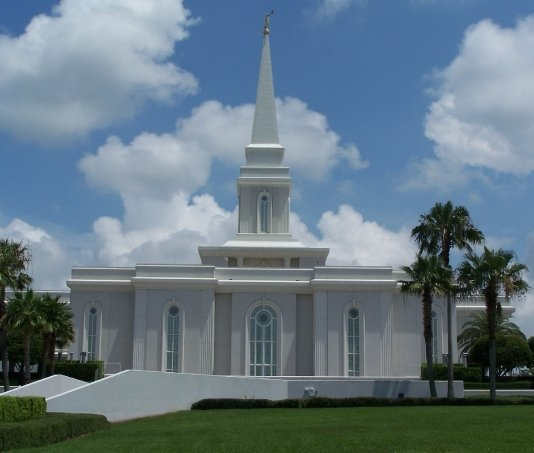
View of southern side of temple

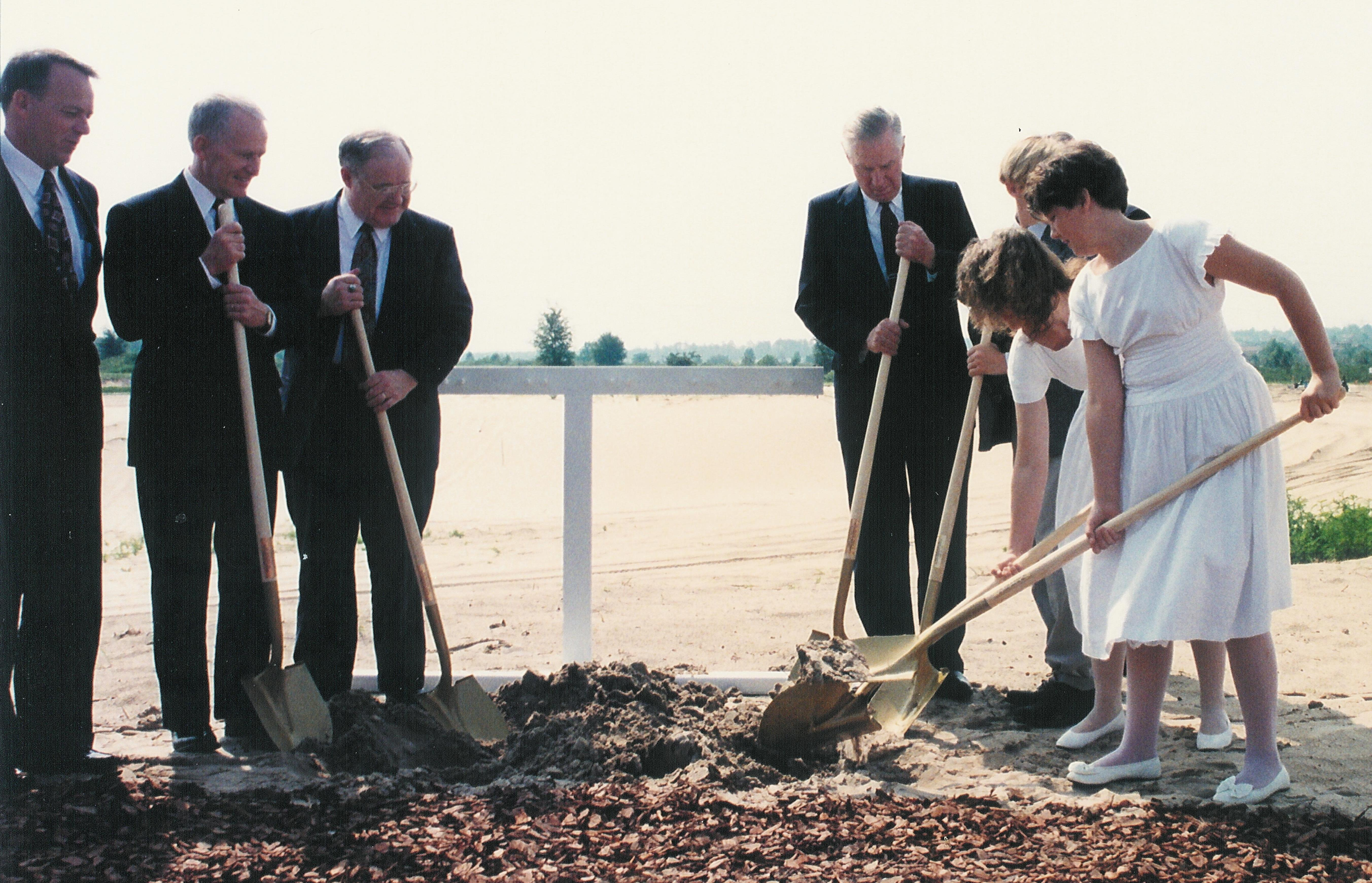
James E. Faust and Alexander B. Morrison at the Orlando Temple groundbreaking

Orlando Florida Temple at sunrise

== See also ==
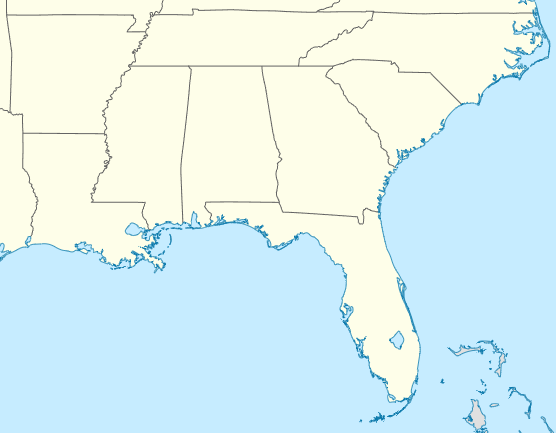
Temples in the Southeastern United States
- = Operating
- = Under construction
- = Announced
- = Temporarily Closed
- Comparison of temples of The Church of Jesus Christ of Latter-day Saints
- List of temples of The Church of Jesus Christ of Latter-day Saints
- List of temples of The Church of Jesus Christ of Latter-day Saints by geographic region
- Temple architecture (Latter-day Saints)
- The Church of Jesus Christ of Latter-day Saints in Florida
