= Howard W. Hunter =

American religious leader (1907–1995)

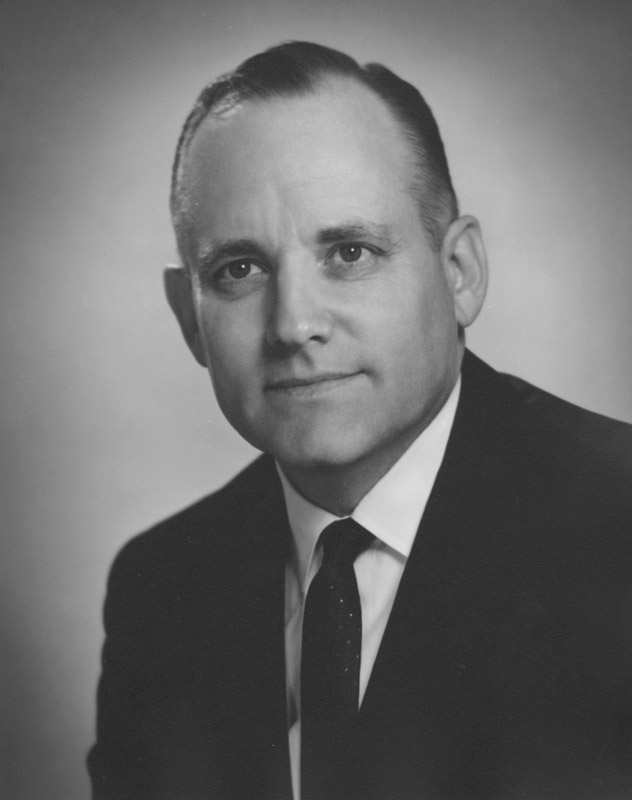
- Hunter in 1962

14th President of the Church of Jesus Christ of Latter-day Saints
- June 5, 1994 – March 3, 1995
- Predecessor: Ezra Taft Benson
- Successor: Gordon B. Hinckley

President of the Quorum of the Twelve Apostles
- May 20, 1988 – June 5, 1994
- Predecessor: Marion G. Romney
- Successor: Gordon B. Hinckley
- End reason: Became President of the Church

Acting President of the Quorum of the Twelve Apostles
- November 10, 1985 – May 20, 1988
- Reason: Due to Marion G. Romney's poor health
- End reason: Became President of the Quorum of the Twelve Apostles

Quorum of the Twelve Apostles
- October 10, 1959 – June 5, 1994
- Called by: David O. McKay
- End reason: Became President of the Church

LDS Church Apostle
- October 15, 1959 – March 3, 1995
- Called by: David O. McKay
- Reason: Death of Stephen L Richards and addition of Henry D. Moyle to First Presidency
- Reorganization at end of term: Henry B. Eyring ordained

Personal details
- Born: Howard William Hunter; November 14, 1907; Boise, Idaho, U.S.
- Died: March 3, 1995 (aged 87); Salt Lake City, Utah, U.S.
- Resting place: Salt Lake City Cemetery; 40°46′37.92″N 111°51′28.8″W
- Education: Southwestern Law School (LLB)
- Spouse(s): Clara May Jeffs (m. 1931; died 1983) Inis Stanton (m. 1990)
- Children: 3
- Signature

Howard William Hunter (November 14, 1907 – March 3, 1995) was an American lawyer and the 14th president of the Church of Jesus Christ of Latter-day Saints (LDS Church) from 1994 to 1995. His nine-month presidential tenure is the shortest in the church's history. Hunter was the first president of the LDS Church born in the 20th century and the last to die in it. He was sustained as an LDS apostle at the age of 51, and served as a general authority for over 35 years.

== Early life ==
Hunter was born to John William and Nellie Marie Hunter in Boise, Idaho. His father, who was not a Latter-day Saint but joined the church in 1927, would not allow Hunter to be baptized until he was 12; Hunter was ordained to the Aaronic priesthood several months after he turned 12. He was the second person to become an Eagle Scout in the state of Idaho.

In March 1923, the Boise Ward, where Hunter had been a member since his baptism, was split, and he ended up in the new Boise 2nd Ward. It initially met in a Jewish synagogue that was provided free of charge. When calls were issued to build the Boise LDS Tabernacle, Hunter was the first to pledge money for the building, offering $25.

Hunter had a love for music and played the piano, violin, drums, saxophone, clarinet, and trumpet. He formed a band called Hunter's Croonaders, which played at many regional events and on a cruise ship to Asia.

== Professional career ==
In 1928, Hunter tried a system where he would publish train and bus schedules and charge for advertising, placing them in hotels. The project worked moderately well in such cities as Nampa and Twin Falls, but it was unsuccessful in Pocatello, Idaho. After this failure, Hunter moved to southern California.

In California, Hunter initially worked in a citrus factory and in shoe sales. After a few weeks he secured a job at a Bank of Italy branch on April 23, 1928. Hunter studied at the American Institute of Banking while working for the Bank of Italy. Besides working in banking, Hunter was still playing the saxophone for dances on a regular basis.

In November 1930, Hunter was involved in booking for the merger of the Bank of Italy with the Bank of America of California to form the Bank of America National Trust and Savings Association. Shortly after, Hunter took a position as a junior officer with the First Exchange Bank of Inglewood. This bank was taken over by the state of California and placed in receivership in January 1932. For the next two years, Hunter filled several odd jobs, including working as a bridge painter and a laundry detergent peddler. In 1934, he managed to get a position as a title examiner with the Los Angeles County Flood Control District. In 1935, Hunter began his studies at Southwestern Law School and eventually had a successful career as a lawyer.

== Leadership in the LDS Church ==
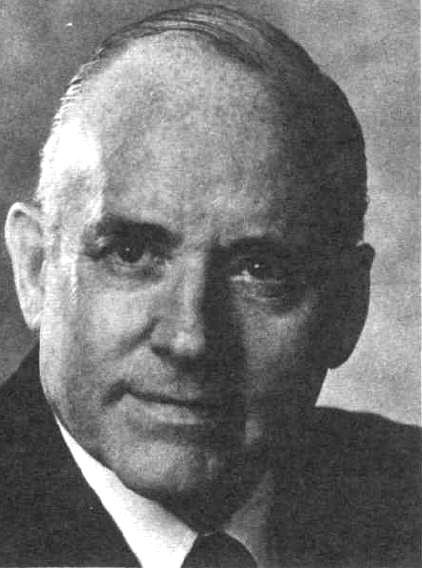
Hunter c. 1975

Prior to his call as an apostle, Hunter held several leadership positions in the LDS Church. He was the first president of the church's Pasadena California Stake, where he had also served as a bishop.

Hunter became a member of the Quorum of the Twelve Apostles in 1959. He filled a vacancy in the Quorum created when apostle Henry D. Moyle was added to the First Presidency following the death of Stephen L Richards, a counselor in the First Presidency.

In January 1965, Hunter was appointed the president of the board of directors of the Polynesian Cultural Center (PCC). At the time, the PCC was two years old, had just closed its second year with a loss of nearly $500,000, and had barely made payroll the month before. Hunter reduced board membership from 21 to 10, drew members with more broad business backgrounds, and emphasized "good hard headed business practice." In three years, the PCC was turning a profit. He remained the president of PCC's board of directors until 1976.

As an apostle, Hunter led church negotiations to acquire land in Jerusalem to build the BYU Jerusalem Center, which he dedicated in 1989.

In 1970, when Joseph Fielding Smith became president of the church, Hunter succeeded him as Church Historian and Recorder. Hunter held this position until 1972, and was succeeded by Leonard J. Arrington.

In November 1985, when Ezra Taft Benson became church president, Hunter was named Acting President of the Quorum of the Twelve due to the infirmity of Marion G. Romney, who became quorum president by seniority. Hunter became the quorum president upon Romney's death in 1988.

Hunter became church president in June 1994, following Benson's death. Hunter retained Gordon B. Hinckley and Thomas S. Monson as counselors in the First Presidency. He offered a conciliatory message at his initial news conference, saying, "To those who have transgressed or been offended, we say, 'Come back.'"

Some of Hunter's contributions as church president include the creation of the church's 2000th stake and drafting of the "Proclamation on the Family", which was released six months after his death. As church president, Hunter encouraged and emphasized Christ-like living and temple attendance. He dedicated the Orlando Florida and Bountiful Utah temples shortly before his death.

Hunter's teachings as an apostle were the 2016 course of study in the LDS Church's Sunday Relief Society and Melchizedek priesthood classes.

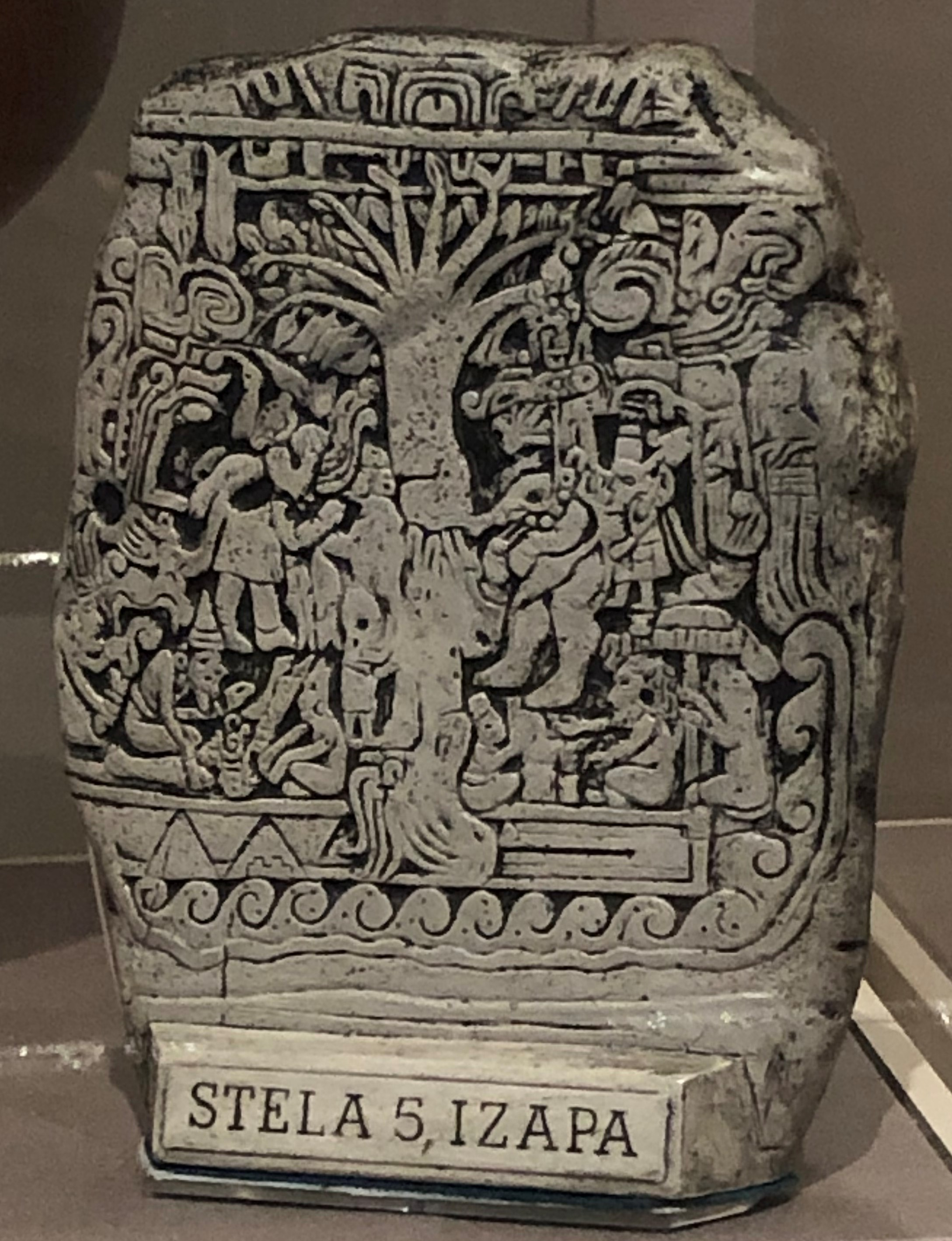
Izapa Stela 5 replica that sat on the desk of Howard W. Hunter, representing his long affiliation with NWAF

=== Leadership in other LDS Church-owned endeavors ===
Hunter served in several LDS Church assignments not directly related to ecclesiastical matters while a member of the Quorum of the Twelve. He was a member of the Board of Trustees of Brigham Young University and closely involved with the founding of the J. Reuben Clark Law School. He also was a member of the Board of Trustees of the New World Archaeology Foundation, chairman of the board of the PCC, and president of the Genealogical Society of Utah.

=== Attempted hostage incident ===
While preparing to speak at a CES fireside being held at Brigham Young University's Marriott Center on February 7, 1993, Hunter was confronted by Cody Judy, who rushed onto the rostrum and threatened Hunter and the audience of 15,000 to 17,000. Judy carried a briefcase that he claimed contained a bomb and held what appeared to be a detonator-like device. Judy demanded that Hunter read a three-page document that supposedly detailed God's plan for Judy to lead the church, which Hunter refused to do. The audience spontaneously sang "We Thank Thee, O God, for a Prophet", during which students from the audience, and then security personnel, overtook Judy. After Judy was taken away, Hunter delivered his prepared remarks, a talk entitled, "An Anchor to the Souls of Men."

== Health problems and death ==
When Hunter was four years old, he was stricken with polio, which afflicted his back so that he was never able to bend forward and touch the ground again.

While serving as president of the Quorum of the Twelve, Hunter developed major health problems that continued for the remainder of his life, including a heart attack, broken ribs from a fall at general conference, heart bypass surgery, bleeding ulcers, and kidney failure. Hunter was admitted to LDS Hospital on January 12, 1995, for exhaustion and was released on January 16. While hospitalized, it was discovered that Hunter was suffering from prostate cancer that had spread to the bones.

Hunter died at age 87 in his downtown Salt Lake City residence as a result of the cancer. With him at the time of his death were his wife, Inis; his nurse, who had been attending him; and his personal secretary, Lowell Hardy. Funeral services were held on March 8, 1995, at the Salt Lake Tabernacle, under the direction of Hinckley, Hunter's counselor in the First Presidency and president of the Quorum of the Twelve. Hinckley replaced Hunter as president of the LDS Church. Hunter was buried in the Salt Lake City Cemetery. On October 14, 2007, at her home in Laguna Hills, California, Inis Hunter died of causes incident to age.

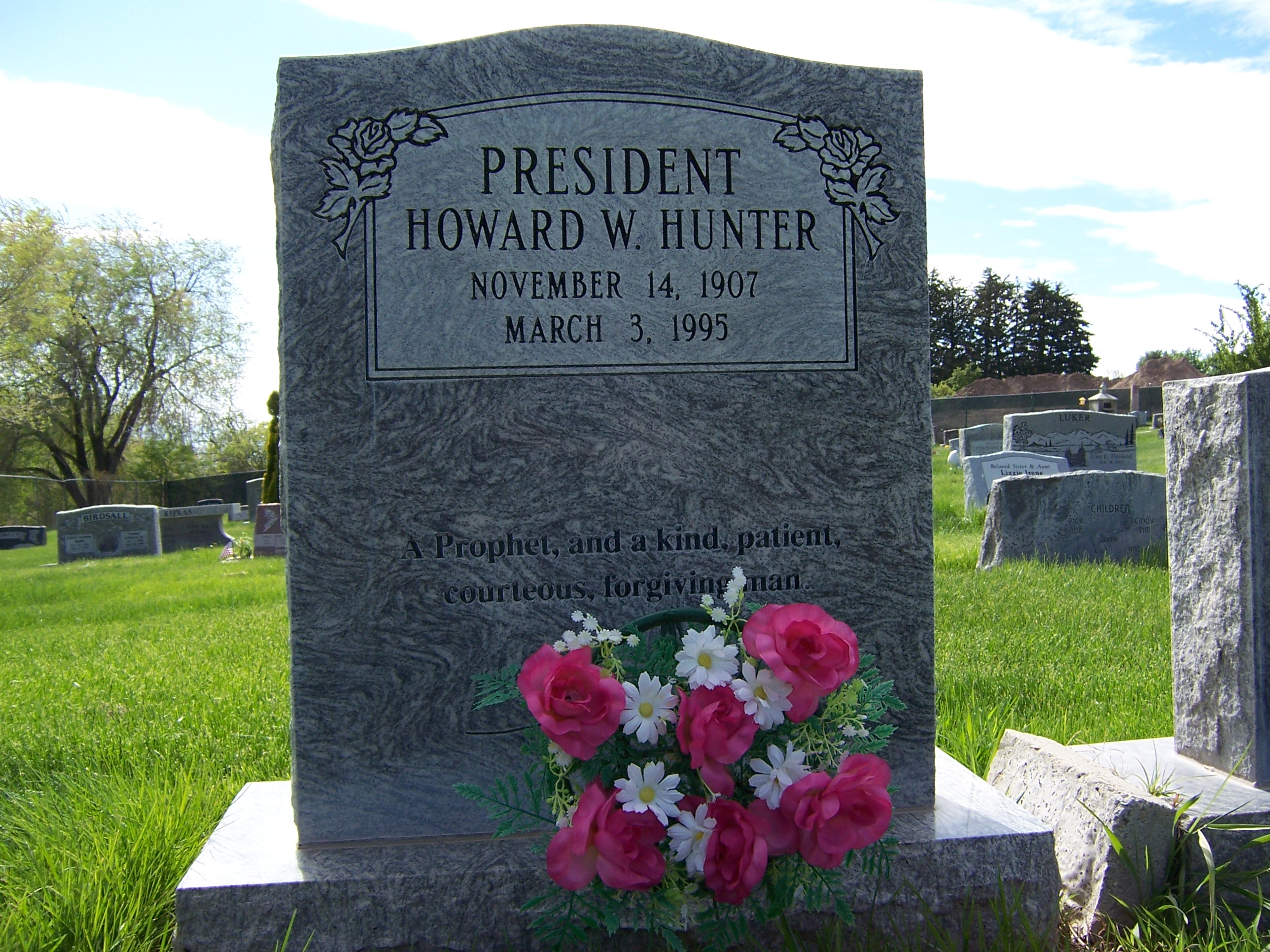
Grave marker of Howard W. Hunter.

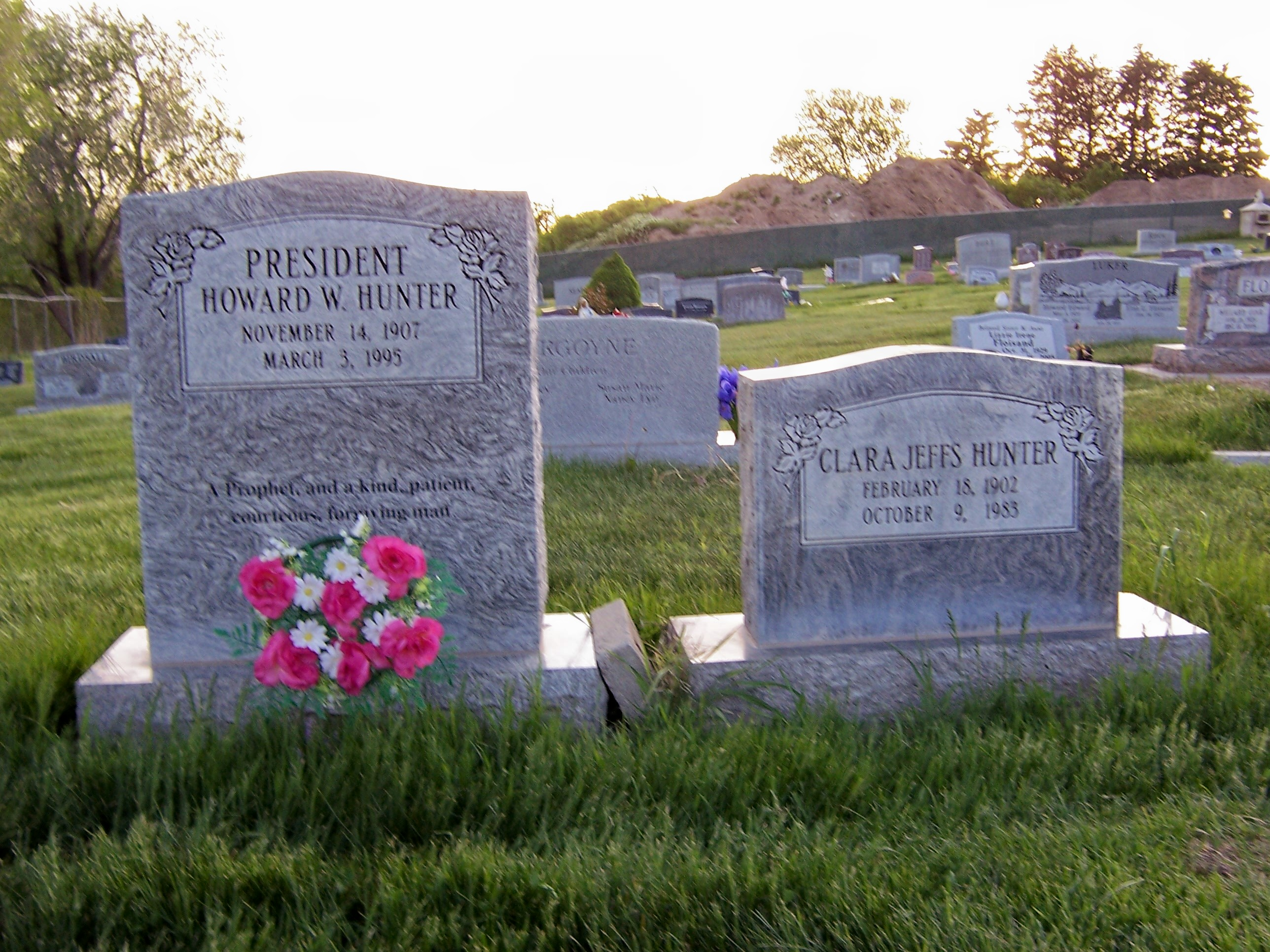
Grave marker of Howard W. Hunter and his wife Clara Jeffs Hunter.

== Personal life ==
In June 1928, Hunter met Clara May "Claire" Jeffs, a young woman from Salt Lake City and they were married in the Salt Lake Temple on June 10, 1931. The Hunters' first son, William, died a year before Hunter started law school. While he was in law school, they had other two sons, Richard and John, who lived until adulthood and both became attorneys. After the death of Hunter's first wife in 1983, he married Inis Stanton in 1990 while he was president of the Quorum of the Twelve Apostles.

== Legacy ==
- Howard W. Hunter Law Library, at the J. Reuben Clark Law School at Brigham Young University, named in 1995
- Howard W. Hunter Professorship at the J. Reuben Clark Law School, established in 1989, to support faculty research, writing, and scholarship.
- Howard W. Hunter Foundation
- Howard W. Hunter Chair of Mormon Studies at Claremont Graduate University

== Works ==
- Hunter, Howard W. (1997). Clyde J. Williams (ed.). The Teachings of Howard W. Hunter, Fourteenth President of the Church of Jesus Christ of Latter-day Saints. Bookcraft.
- Hunter, Howard W. (1994). That We Might Have Joy. Deseret Book.
- Hunter, Howard W. (2015). Teachings of Presidents of the Church: Howard W. Hunter. LDS Church.

== Notes ==
The Church of Jesus Christ of Latter-day Saints titles
Preceded by Ezra Taft Benson	President of the Church; June 5, 1994–Mar 3, 1995	Succeeded by Gordon B. Hinckley
Preceded by Marion G. Romney	President of the Quorum of the Twelve Apostles; 1988–1994	Succeeded by Gordon B. Hinckley
Preceded by Hugh B. Brown	Quorum of the Twelve Apostles; October 15, 1959–March 3, 1995	Succeeded by Gordon B. Hinckley
