= Dieter F. Uchtdorf =

German religious leader (born 1940)

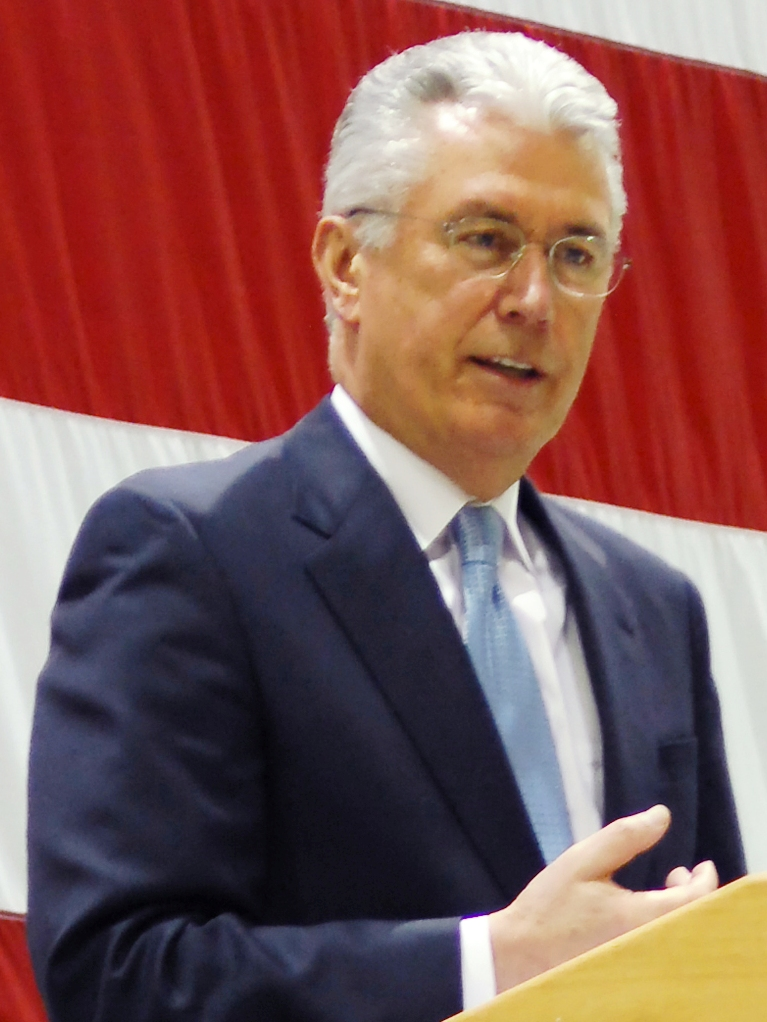
- Uchtdorf in 2011

Acting President of the Quorum of the Twelve Apostles
- January 8, 2026
- Called by: Dallin H. Oaks

Quorum of the Twelve Apostles
- 2 January 2018 – present

Second Counselor in the First Presidency
- 3 February 2008 – 2 January 2018
- Called by: Thomas S. Monson
- Predecessor: Henry B. Eyring
- Successor: Henry B. Eyring
- End reason: Dissolution of First Presidency on death of Thomas S. Monson

Quorum of the Twelve Apostles
- 2 October 2004 – 3 February 2008
- Called by: Gordon B. Hinckley
- End reason: Called as Second Counselor in the First Presidency

LDS Church Apostle
- 7 October 2004
- Called by: Gordon B. Hinckley
- Reason: Death of Neal A. Maxwell

Presidency of the Seventy
- 15 August 2002 – 2 October 2004
- Called by: Gordon B. Hinckley
- End reason: Called to the Quorum of the Twelve Apostles

First Quorum of the Seventy
- 7 April 1996 – 2 October 2004
- Called by: Gordon B. Hinckley
- End reason: Called to the Quorum of the Twelve Apostles

Second Quorum of the Seventy
- 2 April 1994 – 7 April 1996
- Called by: Ezra Taft Benson
- End reason: Transferred to the First Quorum of the Seventy

Military career
- 1959–1965
- Allegiance: West Germany
- Service/branch: German Air Force
- Awards: Commander's Trophy (USAF)

Personal details
- Born: Dieter Friedrich Uchtdorf; 6 November 1940 (age 86); Mährisch-Ostrau, Protectorate of Bohemia and Moravia (now Ostrava, Czech Republic)
- Alma mater: International Institute for Management Development (MBA)
- Spouse(s): Harriet Reich Uchtdorf (1962–present)
- Children: 2

Dieter Friedrich Uchtdorf (born 6 November 1940) is a German religious leader and former pilot who is the acting president of the Quorum of the Twelve Apostles of the Church of Jesus Christ of Latter-day Saints (LDS Church). Prior to his calling to full-time church service, he worked as an aviator and airline executive. Called as an apostle in 2004, he served as Second Counselor to Thomas S. Monson in the First Presidency from 2008 until Monson's death on 2 January 2018. Currently, Uchtdorf is the third most senior apostle in the ranks of the church.

== Early life and education ==
Uchtdorf was born to Sudeten German parents Karl Albert Uchtdorf and Hildegard Else Opelt in Moravská Ostrava (German: Mährisch-Ostrau), which at the time was in the Nazi-occupied Protectorate of Bohemia and Moravia (now Ostrava, Czech Republic). His father was a customs officer, who was conscripted into the German Army toward the end of World War II and sent to the Western Front. When a young child, Uchtdorf traveled with his mother and three siblings through areas being bombed in a move to Zwickau in eastern Germany. He later said of this period: "We were refugees with an uncertain future... I played in bombed-out houses and grew up with the ever-present consequences of a lost war and the awareness that my own country had inflicted terrible pain on many nations during the horrific World War II." As a result of his grandmother's encounter with a member of the LDS Church in a soup line, Uchtdorf's family joined the LDS Church when he was still young.

When Uchtdorf was about eleven, his father's political beliefs, incongruent with Soviet rule, earned him the label of "dissenter", thus putting their lives in danger. They fled from East Germany and resettled in West Germany. His sisters accomplished this by jumping from a moving train that happened to pass through West Germany, while Dieter and his mother climbed a mountain to avoid GDR guard checkpoints.

Uchtdorf started studying mechanical engineering at age 18 but later continued in business administration in Cologne and graduated from Institut pour l'Etude des Methodes de Direction de l'Entreprise (today the IMD Business School) in Lausanne, with an MBA. He received an honorary doctorate in international leadership from Brigham Young University during the April 2009 graduation ceremony.

== Aviator ==
When Uchtdorf was conscripted into the newly formed Bundeswehr in 1959, he volunteered for the air force, at age 19, to become a fighter pilot. Due to an agreement between the West German and US governments, Uchtdorf trained as a fighter pilot in Big Spring, Texas, where he excelled, earning the coveted Commander's Trophy (USAF) for being the best student pilot in his class. After earning wings from both the German and US air forces, he served for six years as a fighter pilot in West Germany, leaving in 1965 to join Lufthansa. By 1970, at 29 years of age, Uchtdorf had reached the rank of captain with Lufthansa. He was appointed in 1975 as head of Lufthansa's new Arizona Training School in the US, and in 1980 he was made head chief pilot of cockpit crews, followed by appointment to senior vice president of flight operations in 1982. He left Lufthansa in 1996, two years after being called as an LDS Church general authority.

== LDS Church service ==
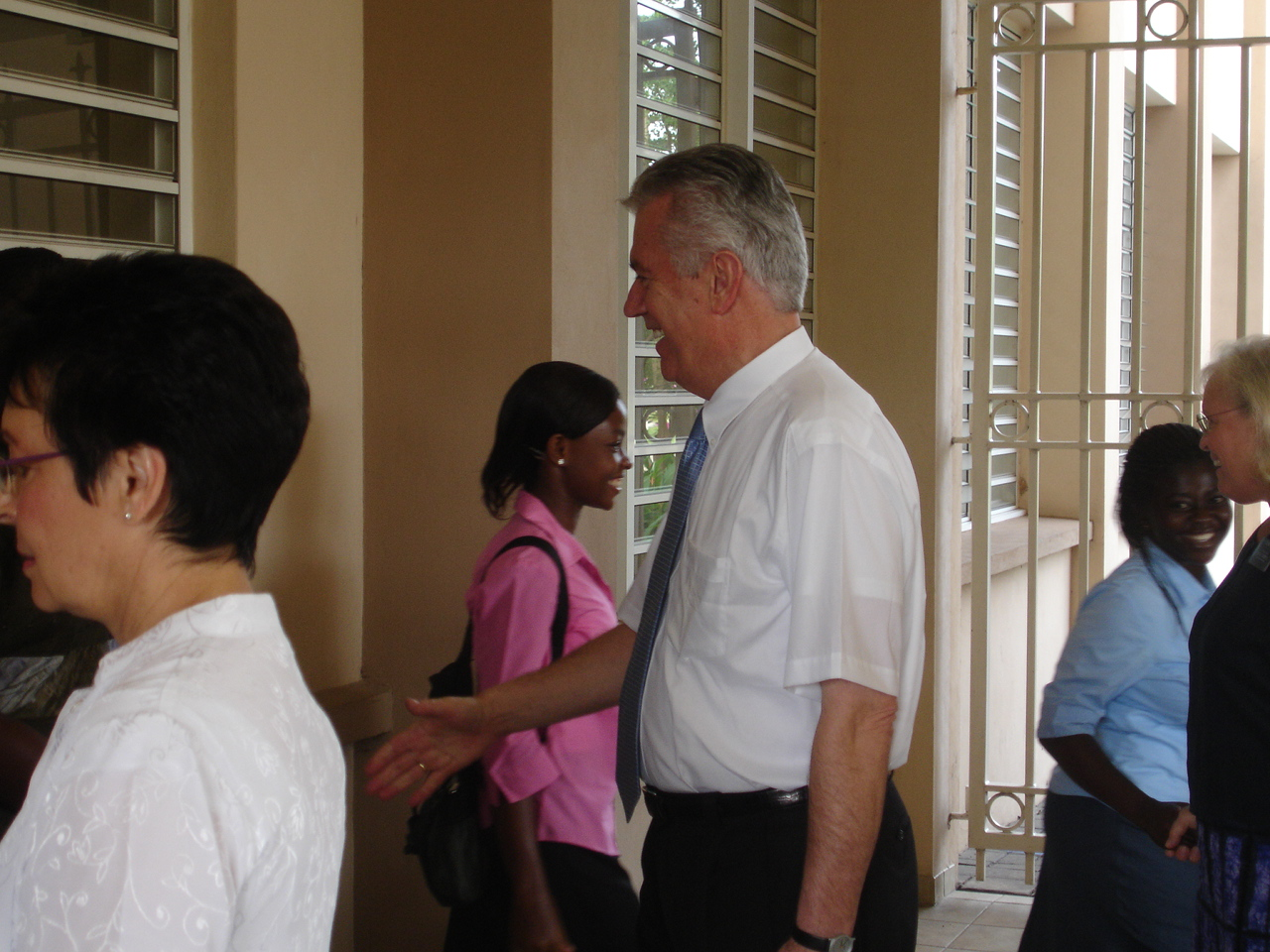
Uchtdorf visiting the Accra, Ghana LDS mission in 2007

Uchtdorf served twice as a stake president in the LDS Church, presiding over the Frankfurt and the Mannheim stakes.

Uchtdorf was called as a general authority and member of the church's Second Quorum of the Seventy on 2 April 1994. On 7 April 1996, he was transferred to the First Quorum of Seventy. Uchtdorf became a member of the church's Presidency of the Seventy on 15 August 2002.

=== Apostle ===
Uchtdorf was sustained a member of the Quorum of the Twelve Apostles on 2 October 2004. He was ordained an apostle on 7 October 2004 by church president Gordon B. Hinckley. Uchtdorf and David A. Bednar were called to fill the vacancies created by the July 2004 deaths of quorum members David B. Haight and Neal A. Maxwell. Uchtdorf was the first church apostle ordained in the 21st century. As an apostle, Uchtdorf is accepted by the church as a prophet, seer, and revelator.

Uchtdorf is the eleventh apostle of the LDS Church to be born outside the United States. He is the first German apostle in church history and was the first born outside of North America since the death of John A. Widtsoe in 1952.

While in Slovakia on 12 May 2006, Uchtdorf offered a prayer dedicating the land "for the preaching of the gospel", an LDS Church leadership custom usually observed at the time missionaries arrive in a new country. Although missionaries had been in what is now Slovakia for over a century, since the split with the Czech Republic, this dedication was specific for the new country.

=== Counselor in the First Presidency ===
On 3 February 2008, Uchtdorf became the Second Counselor to Thomas S. Monson in the church's First Presidency. He is the second non-English native speaker to have served in the First Presidency. After joining the First Presidency, Uchtdorf became a naturalized US citizen; he has remained a citizen of Germany.

While serving in the First Presidency, Uchtdorf dedicated the Tegucigalpa Honduras, Quetzaltenango Guatemala, Manaus Brazil, Fort Lauderdale Florida, Cordoba Argentina, Trujillo Peru, Tijuana Mexico, Fort Collins Colorado, and Tucson Arizona temples. Uchtdorf has also participated in the dedication of many other temples as a member of the Twelve and the First Presidency.

In May 2016, Uchtdorf traveled to the Czech Republic to create the first stake in that nation.

At the time of Monson's death on 2 January 2018, with the dissolution of the First Presidency, Uchtdorf returned to the Quorum of the Twelve Apostles, along with Monson's First Counselor, Henry B. Eyring. When the First Presidency was subsequently reorganized under new church president Russell M. Nelson, Uchtdorf was not retained as a counselor in the First Presidency and continued his service in the Quorum of the Twelve Apostles.

While not unprecedented in church history, the last time a new church president did not retain a counselor who served in the First Presidency under his predecessor was in 1985. Uchtdorf, who had taught as a member of the First Presidency that church members should neither seek or decline callings, that they should lift where they stand, and that at the end of each assignment, subsequent changes should be graciously accepted, posted his support for the new leaders, especially referencing his willingness to resume his ministry as a member of the Quorum of the Twelve Apostles.

=== Quorum of the Twelve ===
Following his return to the Quorum of the Twelve after the reorganization of the First Presidency, the church announced new assignments for Uchtdorf on January 22, 2018. These assignments had been noted by Nelson in the news conference where the new First Presidency was announced. The assignments include chairman of the church's Missionary Executive Council, chairman of the Correlation Executive Council, and being the primary contact for the church's Europe and Europe East areas. On January 8, 2026, he was set apart as the acting president of the Quorum of the Twelve.

==== Political donations ====
In March 2021, public records showed 23 different donations which were made under Uchtdorf's name in 2020 and 2021. These donations were made to Joe Biden's presidential campaign, Democratic candidates in the Georgia Senate race, and other Democratic political funds. If made solely by Uchtdorf, this would be contrary to the LDS Church's political neutrality policies. Uchtdorf issued a statement noting the donations were made from a shared online family account and that having the contributions show in his name was an oversight.

== Family ==
Uchtdorf and his wife, Harriet Reich Uchtdorf, were married on 14 December 1962 in the Swiss Temple. They are the parents of two children and have six grandchildren.

== Works ==
- Uchtdorf, Dieter F. (2012), Forget Me Not, Salt Lake City: Deseret Book, ISBN 978-1-60907-119-6
- —— (2011), Your happily ever after, Salt Lake City: Deseret Book, ISBN 978-1-60641-652-5, OCLC 727126663
- —— (2010), The remarkable soul of a woman, Salt Lake City: Deseret Book, ISBN 978-1-60641-244-2, OCLC 502304343
- —— (2005), Sister Eternal, Salt Lake City: Deseret Book, ISBN 978-1-59038-535-7, OCLC 60931317

== See also ==
- Church Educational System
- Council on the Disposition of the Tithes
- Uchtdorf, a village in Germany

== Notes ==
The Church of Jesus Christ of Latter-day Saints titles
Preceded by Henry B. Eyring	Second Counselor in the First Presidency; February 3, 2008 - January 2, 2018	Succeeded by Henry B. Eyring
Preceded by Henry B. Eyring	Quorum of the Twelve Apostles; October 7, 2004 – February 3, 2008; January 2, 2018 –	Succeeded by David A. Bednar
