= Marriage in the Church of Jesus Christ of Latter-day Saints =

In the Church of Jesus Christ of Latter-day Saints (LDS Church), marriage between a man and a woman is considered to be "ordained of God". Marriage is thought to consist of a covenant between the man, the woman, and God. The church teaches that in addition to civil marriage, which ends at death, a man and woman can enter into a celestial marriage, performed in a temple by priesthood authority, whereby the marriage and parent-child relationships resulting from the marriage will last forever in the afterlife.

From 1852 until 1890, the LDS Church openly authorized polygamous marriages between one man and multiple wives, though polygamous families continued cohabitating into the 1940s and 1950s. Today, the church is opposed to such marriages and excommunicates members who participate in them or publicly teach that they are sanctioned by God. The LDS Church also opposes the legalization of same-sex marriage.

== Teachings about marriage in general ==
A spouse is the only person other than the Lord that Latter-day Saints are commanded to love "with all [their] heart". A revelation in the Doctrine and Covenants states: "Thou shalt love thy wife with all thy heart, and shalt cleave unto her and none else." Church leaders have taught that this commandment applies equally to wives loving their husbands.

The LDS Church also teaches that marriage is a partnership of equals and that partners should be thoughtful, respectful, and loyal to one another. The church teaches that if couples keep their lives centered on Jesus Christ, their love will grow. Regarding marriage and divorce, the church instructs its leaders: "No priesthood officer is to counsel a person whom to marry. Nor should he counsel a person to divorce his or her spouse. Those decisions must originate and remain with the individual. When a marriage ends in divorce, or if a husband and wife separate, they should always receive counseling from Church leaders."

In the LDS Church, the bride should wear a wedding dress that is "white, modest in design and fabric, and free of elaborate ornamentation" when getting married in the temple. The church says, "White is the symbol of purity. No unclean person has the right to enter God's house."

== Teachings about celestial marriage ==
Celestial (or eternal) marriage is an ordinance performed by priesthood authority in a temple of the church. A celestial marriage is thought to continue forever into the afterlife if the man and woman do not break their covenants. Thus, eternally married couples are often referred to as being "sealed" to each other. Sealed couples who keep their covenants are also promised to have their posterity sealed to them in the afterlife.

=== Celestial marriage as a requirement for exaltation ===
The LDS Church teaches that a celestial marriage is required for exaltation. This teaching is based on Mormon scripture, in which Joseph Smith taught, "In the celestial glory there are three heavens or degrees; and to obtain the highest, a man must enter into this order of the priesthood [meaning the new and everlasting covenant of marriage]; and if he does not, he cannot obtain it. He may enter into the other, but that is the end of his kingdom; he cannot have an increase". Exaltation is also known as "eternal life" and is defined as "the kind of life God lives". Those who are exalted will "live eternally in the presence of Heavenly Father and Jesus Christ[;] will become gods[;] will be united eternally with their righteous family members and will be able to have eternal increase [spirit children][; and] will have everything that our Heavenly Father and Jesus Christ have—all power, glory, dominion, and knowledge". Members of the LDS Church are encouraged to prepare to be celestially married in a temple.

It is believed, therefore, that all humans are spirit children of "heavenly parents" who as mortals were celestially married and went on to become exalted. This married couple is known to Latter-day Saints as God the Father and Heavenly Mother. Because of the beliefs that (1) celestial marriage is required for exaltation, and (2) that Jesus is exalted, some leaders of the LDS Church have hypothesized that Jesus must have been married, possibly to Mary Magdalene, Mary, sister of Lazarus, and/or Martha.

Because it is a requirement for exaltation, celestial marriages are performed vicariously in church temples for deceased couples who were legally married.

== Civil marriage and divorce and its relationship to celestial marriage ==
In some legal jurisdictions, celestial marriages can be recognized as civil marriages; in other cases, couples are civilly married outside of the temple and are later sealed in a celestial marriage. The church will no longer perform a celestial marriage on a couple unless they are first (or simultaneously) legally married.

A celestial marriage is not annulled by a civil divorce: a "cancellation of a sealing" may be granted, but only by the First Presidency, the highest authority in the church. Civil divorce and marriage outside the temple carry with them a stigma in Mormon culture; the church teaches that the "gospel of Jesus Christ—including repentance, forgiveness, integrity, and love—provides the remedy for conflict in marriage.

== Polygamy ==
Until 1890, the LDS Church openly sanctioned plural marriage, which was the practice of marrying a man celestially to multiple women. Such polygamous marriages were celestial marriages only, not legal civil marriages. Today, the church is opposed to such marriages and excommunicates members who participate in them, whether or not polygamy is legal in the jurisdiction in question. The church teaches that "the standard doctrine of the church is monogamy" and that polygamy was a temporary exception to the rule. In defense of the practice, some early church leaders taught that God the Father and Jesus Christ both practiced polygamy. These ideas were generally accepted among church members in the 1850s.

== Interracial marriage ==
In the past, LDS Church leaders have consistently opposed marriage between different ethnicities. The apostle Boyd K. Packer stated in 1977 that "[w]e've always counseled in the Church for our Mexican members to marry Mexicans, our Japanese members to marry Japanese, our Caucasians to marry Caucasians, our Polynesian members to marry Polynesians. The counsel has been wise." Nearly every decade beginning with the church's formation until the 1970s has seen some denunciation against miscegenation, with most focusing on black-white marriage. These church leaders' views stem from racist "biological and social" principles. One exception was intermarriage with Native Americans, who Mormons believed to be Lamanites, a race descended from ancient Israelites. Intermarriage with Native Americans was encouraged as a way to fulfill a Book of Mormon prophecy that the Lamanites would become "white and delightsome."

Church publications have also contained statements discouraging interracial marriage. In the same June 1978 issue announcing that black members were now eligible for temple rites, missionary service, and priesthood ordination, the official newspaper of the LDS Church printed an article entitled "Interracial marriage discouraged". The same day a church spokesman stated "interracial marriages generally have been discouraged in the past, ... that remains our position" and that "the Church does not prohibit ... interracial marriages but it does discourage them."

In 2003 author Jon Krakauer stated in his Under the Banner of Heaven that "official LDS policy has continued to strongly admonish white saints not to marry blacks." In response, LDS public relations released a statement from BYU Dean of Religious Education Robert L. Millet that "[t]here is, in fact, no mention whatsoever in [the church] handbook concerning interracial marriages. In addition, having served as a Church leader for almost 30 years, I can also certify that I have never received official verbal instructions condemning marriages between black and white members." Though denying any condemnation of interracial marriage, there was no comment on whether it was still discouraged.

The discouragement of marriage between those of different ethnicities by church leaders continued being taught to youth during Sunday meetings until 2013 when the use of the 1996 version of the church Sunday meeting manual for adolescent boys was discontinued. The manual used a 1976 quote from past church president Spencer W. Kimball that said, "We recommend that people marry those who are of the same racial background generally." The quote is still in use, however, in the 2003 institute Eternal Marriage Student Manual.

== Same-sex marriage ==
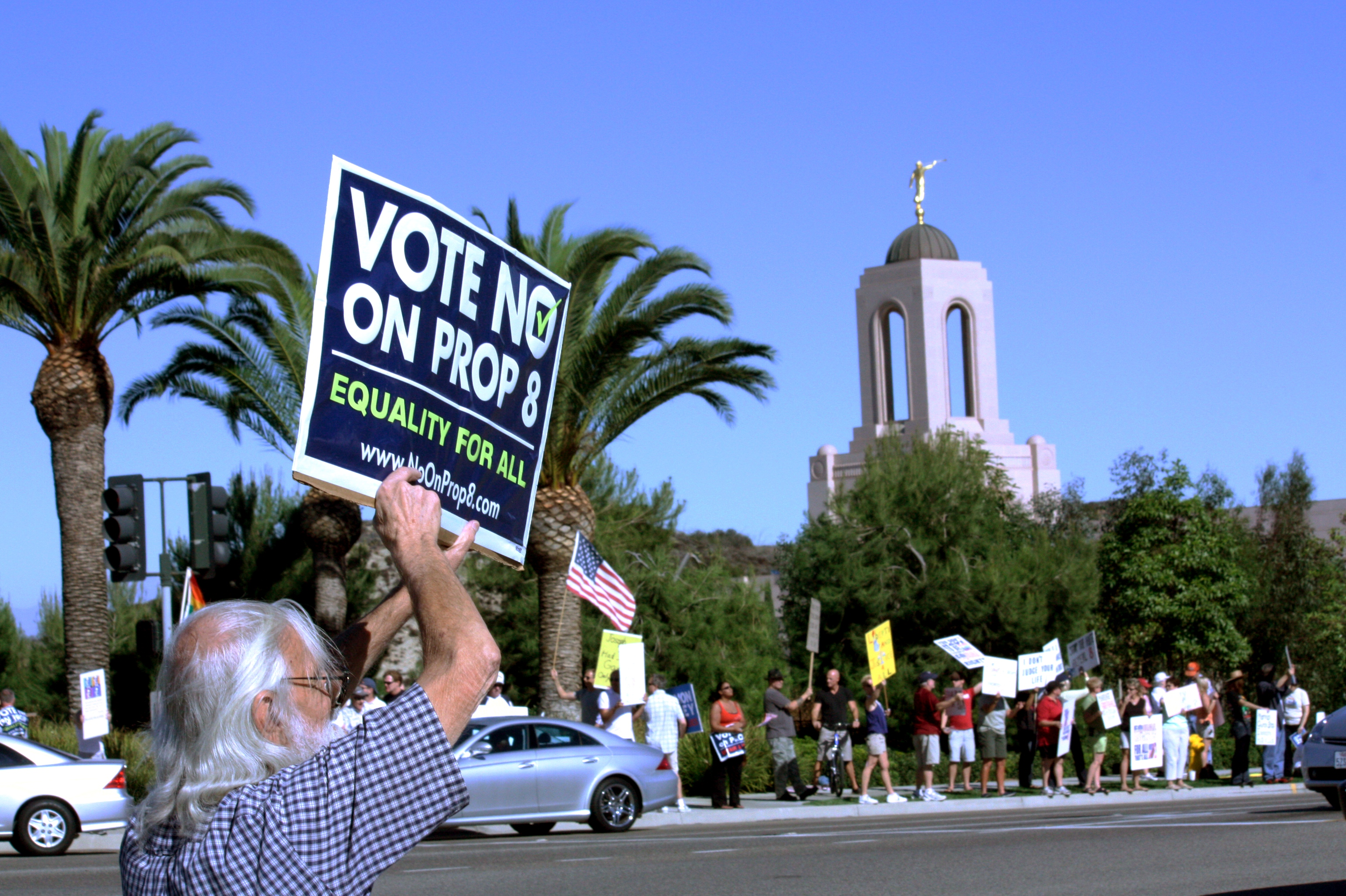
Protesters in front of the Newport Beach California Temple voicing their opposition to the church's support of Prop 8

Beginning in the mid-1990s, the LDS Church began to focus its attention on the issue of same-sex marriages. It officially endorsed a federal amendment to the United States Constitution as well as Utah Constitutional Amendment 3 banning any marriages not between one man and one woman. It opposed same-sex marriage in Hawaii and California and urged its members to donate time and money towards the initiative. In California, church members accounted for 80 to 90 percent of volunteers who campaigned door-to-door and as much as half of the nearly $40 million raised during the campaign on Proposition 8. Members who did not support the church's position could be subject to church discipline, depending on circumstances and the judgement of local leadership. In reference to church involvement with legislation around LGBT people and marriage the apostle M. Russell Ballard has said the church is "locked in" if anything interferes with the principle of marriage being between a man and a woman, and stated that a very careful evaluation is made to determine what action is appropriate.

== Marriage statistics for Latter-day Saints ==
In 2008 the American Religious Identification Survey reported: "Mormons have the highest proportions of currently married adults, and lowest divorce rates reflecting the emphasis on family values in this tradition .... Commitment to 'traditional or normative family values' is measured by creating a combined index of the proportions divorced and cohabiting, whereby those traditions that score lowest are the most familial. The tradition with the lowest percentages on this index is Mormons (11%)".

== See also ==
- Christian views on marriage
- Civil rights and Mormonism
- Sealing (Mormonism)
- Sexuality and Mormonism
