= Civil rights and Mormonism =

Civil rights and Mormonism have been intertwined since the religion's start, with founder Joseph Smith writing on slavery in 1836. Initial Mormon converts were from the north of the United States and opposed slavery. This caused contention in the slave state of Missouri, and the church began distancing itself from abolitionism and justifying slavery based on the Bible. During this time, several slave owners joined the church and brought their enslaved people with them when they moved to Nauvoo, Illinois. The church adopted scriptures which teach against influencing slaves to be "dissatisfied with their condition" as well as scriptures which teach that "all are alike unto God." As mayor of Nauvoo, Smith prohibited Black people from holding office, joining the Nauvoo Legion, voting or marrying whites; but, as president of the church Black people became members and several Black men were ordained to the priesthood. Also during this time, Smith began his presidential campaign on a platform for the government to buy slaves into freedom over several years. He was killed during his presidential campaign.

Some slave owners brought their slaves with them to the Salt Lake Valley, though several slaves escaped. The Church of Jesus Christ of Latter-day Saints (LDS Church) issued a statement of neutrality towards slavery, stating that it was between the slave owner and God. A few years later, Brigham Young began teaching that slavery was ordained of God and that equality efforts were misguided. Under his direction, Utah Territory passed laws supporting slavery and making it illegal for Black people to vote, hold public office, join the Nauvoo Legion, or marry whites. In California, slavery was openly tolerated in the Mormon community of San Bernardino, despite being a free state. In the 1860s, the US federal government freed the slaves and overturned laws prohibiting Black men from voting.

After the Civil War, issues of civil rights went largely unnoticed until the civil rights movement of the 1960s. The National Association for the Advancement of Colored People (NAACP) criticized the church's position on civil rights, led anti-discrimination marches and filed a lawsuit against the church's practice of not allowing black children to be Boy Scout troop leaders. Several athletes began protesting Brigham Young University over its discriminatory practices and the LDS Church policy that did not give black people the priesthood. In response, the church issued a statement supporting civil rights and changed its policy on Boy Scouts. Church apostle Ezra Taft Benson began criticizing the civil rights movement and challenging accusations of police brutality. After the reversal of the priesthood ban in 1978, the church has stayed relatively silent on matters of civil rights.

== Slavery ==
=== Statements on slavery from early church leaders ===
The period from 1830 to 1844 was of fundamental importance in shaping Mormon beliefs and customs with regard to race. Joseph Smith supported and opposed slavery at different points in his life. In 1835, someone (very likely Oliver Cowdery) wrote an official declaration that opposed baptizing slaves against the will of their masters. Joseph Smith would support this declaration. In the statement, they also wrote that it was not right to make slaves "dissatisfied with their situations." The statement became part of the Doctrine and Covenants.

Smith wrote an essay in 1836, published in Latter Day Saints' Messenger and Advocate, which was strongly anti-abolitionist. In the essay, he gave five reasons for opposing the abolition of slavery:

1. Smith feared racial miscegenation and race war, stating that abolitionism was "calculated to ... set loose, upon the world a community of people who might peradventure, overrun our country and violate the most sacred principles of human society, chastity and virtue."
2. Smith believed that any evil inherent in slavery would already have been known and realised by "men of piety" from the Southern slave states—but they had no objection to it.
3. Smith "did not believe that the people of the North have any more right to say that the South shall not hold slaves, than the South have to say the North shall."
4. Smith believed that abolitionism went against the "decree of Jehovah" whereby the Old Testament, in his understanding, decreed that blacks were cursed and destined to be slaves.
5. Smith placed great importance on biblical precedents for slavery, for example in Abraham, Leviticus, Ephesians, and Timothy; and he quoted Paul in the New Testament: "Servants be obedient to them that are your masters according to the flesh, with fear and trembling, the singleness of your heart."

Smith probably wanted to distance Mormons from abolitionists, since many Mormons were living in Missouri, a pro-slavery state. After the Mormons were forced out of Missouri, they lived in Illinois, a free state. Smith's position on slavery changed, and he was vocally against slavery from 1842 until his death.

Because of slave owners who were converting to the church in Missouri, there was much confusion regarding the church's position on slavery. These same feelings arose during the migration to Utah. In 1851, apostle Orson Hyde stated that there was no law in Utah Territory prohibiting or authorizing slavery, and that the decisions on the topic were to remain between slaves and their masters. He also clarified that individuals' choices on the matter were not in any way a reflection of the church as a whole or its doctrine. Church president Brigham Young taught that slavery was "of Divine institution, and not to be abolished until the curse pronounced on Ham shall have been removed from his descendants."

=== In Utah Territory ===
The first known slaves to enter the Utah Territory came west with the congregations of Mississippi. By 1850, 100 Black people had arrived, the majority of whom were enslaved. After the pioneers arrived in the Salt Lake Valley, they continued to buy and sell slaves as property. Many prominent members of the church were slave owners, including William Henry Hooper, Abraham O. Smoot, and Charles C. Rich. Church members would use their slaves as tithing, both lending out their slaves to work for the church as well as giving their slaves to the church. Though initially opposed to it, by the early 1850s Brigham Young was a "firm believer in slavery". Young and Heber C. Kimball used the slave labor that had been donated as tithing and then eventually granted their freedom. The church opposed slaves who wanted to escape their masters.

Utah Territory (1850)

After the Compromise of 1850 allowed California into the Union as a free state while permitting Utah and New Mexico territories the option of deciding the issue by popular sovereignty, the Utah Territorial Legislature took up the issue of legalizing slavery. At that time, Young was governor, and the Utah Territorial Legislature was dominated by church leaders. In 1852, Young addressed the joint session of the legislature advocating slavery. He made the matter religious by declaring that if members of the church believe in the Bible and the priesthood then they should also believe in slavery. Following the speech, the Utah Legislature passed an Act in Relation to Service, which officially sanctioned slavery in Utah Territory. The Utah slavery law stipulated that slaves would be freed if their masters had sexual relations with them; attempted to take them from the territory against their will; or neglected to feed, clothe, or provide shelter to them. In addition, the law stipulated that slaves must receive schooling.

Utah was the only western state or territory that had slaves in 1850, but slavery was never important economically in Utah, and there were fewer than 100 slaves in the territory. In 1860, the census showed that 29 of the 59 black people in Utah Territory were slaves. When the American Civil War broke out in 1861, Utah sided with the Union, and slavery ended in 1862 when the United States Congress abolished slavery in Utah Territory.

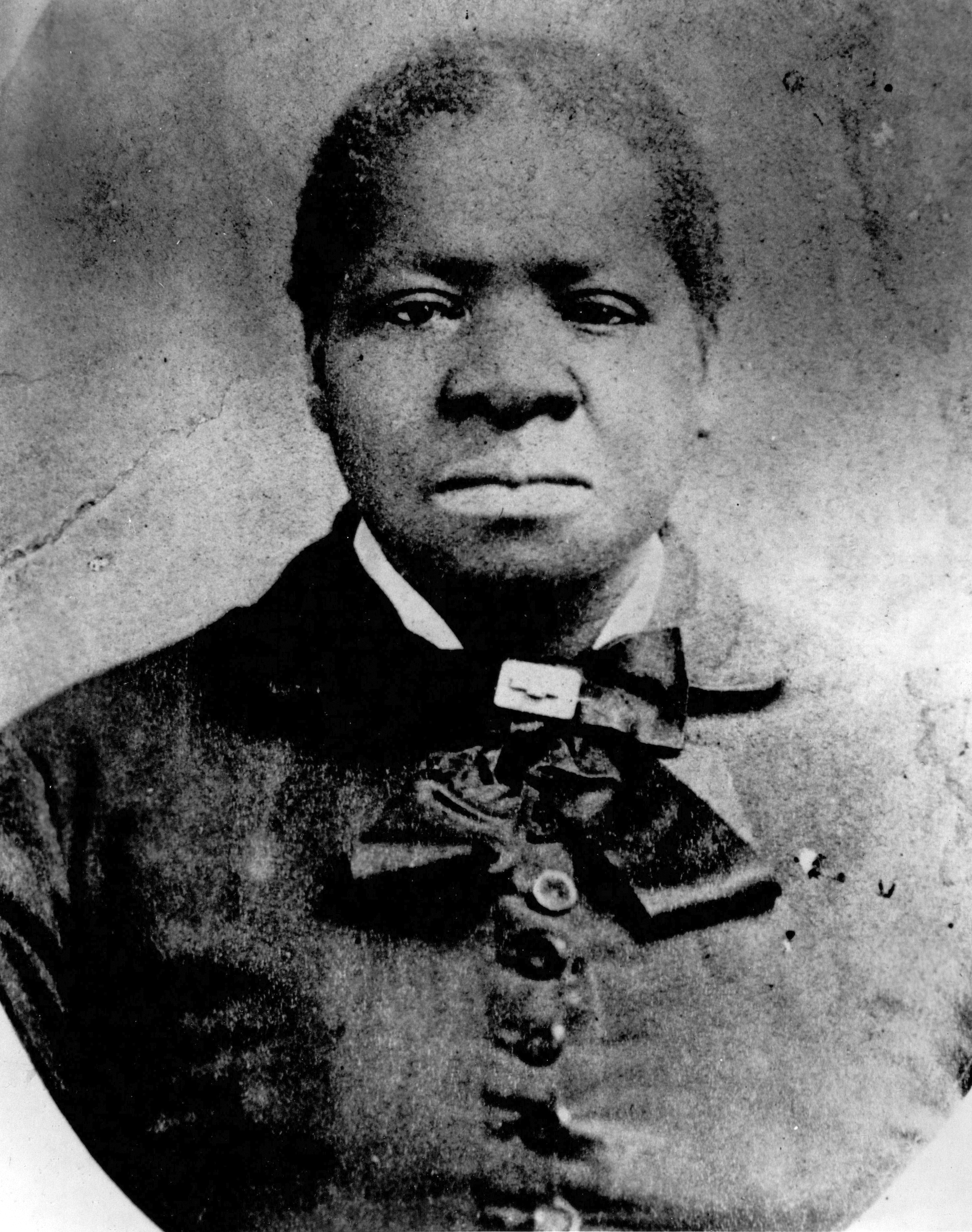
Biddy Mason was one of 14 Black people who sued for their freedom after being illegally held captive in San Bernardino

=== In San Bernardino ===
In 1851, a company of 437 Mormons under direction of Amasa M. Lyman and Charles C. Rich of the Quorum of the Twelve Apostles settled at what is now San Bernardino. This first company took 26 slaves, and more slaves were brought over as San Bernardino continued to grow. Since California was a free state, the slaves should have been freed when they entered. However, slavery was openly tolerated in San Bernardino. Many wanted to be free, but were still under the control of their masters and ignorant of the laws and their rights. The Fugitive Slave act had been passed, which put freedom for African Americans in jeopardy. This law expired in 1855 which opened up an opportunity for the enslaved in California to fight for their freedom. State law prohibited blacks from testifying against whites in the state of California, however, this law was bypassed and a group of slaves took their owner to court. Judge Benjamin Hayes freed 14 slaves who had belonged to Robert Smith. One of these slaves was Bridget "Biddy" Mason, who fought for her freedom after her owner, Robert Smith, attempted to return to Texas where slavery was legal with his slaves. Mason would take Robert Smith to court in the "Mason v Smith 1856" case and win her freedom along with the 13 other slaves that belonged to Robert Smith. Evidence of Robert Smith bribing Biddy Mason's lawyer to drop the case was a huge factor in the judge's decision to free Robert Smith's slaves. Robert Smith then fled back to Texas after he feared he would face charges of bribery. Judge Benjamin Hayes declared that Biddy Mason and the other slaves "should be left to their own pursuit of freedom and happiness." Biddy Mason would go on to become a real estate millionaire, philanthropist, and a prominent member of the Los Angeles community from 1856 to her death in 1891.

== Black suffrage ==
As in other places in Illinois, only free white males could vote in Nauvoo.

When Utah Territory was created, suffrage was only granted to free white males. At that time, only a few states had allowed black suffrage. Brigham Young explained that this was connected to the priesthood ban. He argued that black suffrage would help make blacks equal to whites, which would result in a curse. On January 10, 1867, Congress passed the Territorial Suffrage Act, which prohibited denying suffrage based on race or previous condition of servitude, which nullified Utah's ban on black suffrage.

== Civil rights movement ==
Before the civil rights movement, the LDS Church's doctrine-based policy went largely unnoticed and unchallenged for around a century with the First Presidency stating in 1947 that the doctrine of the LDS Church which banned interracial marriage and black people from entering the temple or receiving the priesthood was never questioned by any of the church leaders. In 1958, apostle Joseph Fielding Smith published Answers to Gospel Questions, which stated that blacks should "receive all the rights and privileges [...] as declared in the Declaration of Independence." He went on to say that black people should not be barred from any type of employment or education, and should be free "to make their lives as happy as it is possible without interference from white men, labor unions, or from any other source."

The church also advocated for segregation laws and enforced segregation in its facilities. Hotel Utah, a church-run hotel, banned black guests, even when other hotels made exceptions for black celebrities. Blacks were prohibited from performing in the Salt Lake Tabernacle, and the Deseret News did not allow black people to appear in photographs with white people. Church leaders urged white members to join civic groups and opened up LDS meetinghouses "for meetings to prevent Negroes from becoming neighbors", even after a 1948 Supreme Court decision against racial covenants in housing. Church leaders counseled members to buy homes so black people wouldn't move next to LDS chapels. In the 1950s, the San Francisco mission office took legal action to prevent black families from moving into the church neighborhood. A black man living in Salt Lake City, Daily Oliver, described how, as a boy in the 1910s, he was excluded from an LDS-led boy scout troop because they did not want blacks in their building.

In 1959, the Utah State Advisory Committee to the U.S. Commission on Civil Rights stated that: "the Negro is the minority citizen who experiences the most widespread inequality in Utah. The exact extent of his mistreatment is almost impossible to ascertain", explaining that "Mormon interpretation attributes birth into any race other than the white race as a result of inferior performance in a pre-earth life and teaches that by righteous living, the dark-skinned races may again become 'white and delightsome'."

=== NAACP involvement ===
In the 1960s, the National Association for the Advancement of Colored People (NAACP) attempted to convince LDS Church leaders to support civil rights legislation and to reverse its practices in relation to African American priesthood holding and temple attendance. In early 1963, NAACP leadership attempted to arrange meetings with church leadership, but were rebuffed in their efforts. Later that year, University of Utah professor Sterling McMurrin arranged a meeting between the NAACP and church leaders. N. Eldon Tanner and Hugh B. Brown, the two counselors to David O. McKay in the First Presidency, met with the head of the Utah NAACP. The NAACP threatened to protest at the October 1963 general conference if the LDS Church did not make a statement about civil rights. Brown promised that a statement would be made. McMurrin wrote the statement, which McKay approved. McKay did not want their statement to be an "official pronouncement of the First Presidency," perhaps because some apostles were against civil rights. During the ensuing general conference, Brown read the statement in support of civil rights legislation before beginning his talk, in a way that made the statement seem official. The NAACP did not protest at the conference.

In 1965, the church leadership met with the NAACP, and agreed to publish an editorial in church-owned newspaper the Deseret News, which would support civil rights legislation pending in the Utah legislature. The church failed to follow-through on the commitment, and Tanner explained, "We have decided to remain silent". In March 1965, the NAACP led an anti-discrimination march in Salt Lake City, protesting church policies. In response, McKay agreed to let the Deseret News reprint the civil rights statement from 1963 as an "official" statement. In 1966, the NAACP issued a statement criticizing the church, saying the church "[had] maintained a rigid and continuous segregation stand" and that the church had made "no effort to counteract the widespread discriminatory practices in education, in housing, in employment, and other areas of life."

Since the early part of the 20th century, each ward of the LDS Church in the United States has organized its own Boy Scouting troop. Some LDS Church-sponsored troops permitted black youth to join, but a church policy required that the troop leader to be the deacons quorum president, which had the result of excluding black children from that role. The NAACP filed a federal lawsuit in 1974 challenging this practice, and soon thereafter the LDS Church reversed its policy.

=== Benson and the civil rights movement ===
After Hugh B. Brown's statement in support of civil rights in 1963, apostle Ezra Taft Benson began to state in speeches that the civil rights movement was a Communist plot. Ralph R. Harding, a congressman from Idaho, criticized Benson's extreme views. Soon afterward, the First Presidency appointed Benson to oversee the European mission of the church. Apostle Joseph Fielding Smith privately expressed that he hoped the appointment would help to temper Benson's extreme political views. Benson returned in 1965 and had not changed his political views. He gave an inflammatory speech in general conference, parts of which were removed when the talk appeared in official church publications.

In the October 1967 general conference, Benson declared that "there is nothing wrong with civil rights—it is what's being done in the name of civil rights that is alarming." Making comparisons to agrarian reform in China and Cuba, he claimed that the civil rights movement was being directed by Communist revolutionaries who want to "destroy America by spilling Negro blood." He also stated that accusing law enforcement of "police brutality" should be recognized as attempts to discredit and discourage law enforcement. His talk was re-published the next year by the church's Deseret Book as a pamphlet titled "Civil Rights: Tool of Communist Deception".

=== Sports protests ===
African-American athletes protested against LDS Church policies by boycotting several sporting events with Brigham Young University. In 1968, after the assassination of Martin Luther King Jr., black members of the UTEP track team approached their coach and expressed their desire not to compete against BYU in an upcoming meet. When the coach disregarded the athletes' complaint, the athletes boycotted the meet. Also in 1968, the San Jose State basketball and football teams refused to play against BYU. In 1969, 14 members of the University of Wyoming football team were removed from the team for planning to protest the discriminatory treatment they had received in their previous match with BYU. In their 1968 match against the University of Wyoming, BYU football players refused the customary post-game handshakes after their loss and went straight to the locker rooms. They turned on the sprinklers, soaking the University of Wyoming football players. Additionally, a "caricature of an ape and a black man" awaited them in the visitors' locker room, and a local paper reported "BYU cleanses field of evil." In November 1969, Stanford University President Kenneth Pitzer suspended athletic relations with BYU. Athletes protested Mormon racial policies at Arizona State University, San Jose State University, the University of New Mexico, and others.

== Equal Rights Amendment ==
In the 1970s, the LDS Church came out against the Equal Rights Amendment. The LDS Church in Utah requested that ten women from each ward attend the Utah International Women's Year in 1977 to support the church's position on the Equal Rights Amendment and other women's issues. The fourteen thousand attendees, mostly Mormon women recruited in their wards, voted on platforms before hearing their discussion and rejected all the national resolutions—even those that did not advocate a moral position opposed to that of the LDS Church. In 1978, the LDS Church encouraged nine thousand female members in greater Las Vegas, Nevada, to canvass their neighborhoods with anti–Equal Rights Amendment pamphlets and encouraged all members to vote. Nevada did not ratify the amendment. Sonia Johnson fought against the church in support of the Equal Rights Amendment and was excommunicated; a December 1979 excommunication letter claimed that Johnson was charged with a variety of misdeeds, including hindering the worldwide missionary program, damaging internal Mormon social programs, and teaching false doctrine. Also in 1979, the Alice Reynolds forum was forbidden from discussing the amendment in the Alice Reynolds reading room at Brigham Young University; the club subsequently found a different place to meet.

== Marriage ==
Marriage has always been an important aspect of Mormon doctrine and culture. Early Mormon communities banned interracial marriages but supported polygamous marriage. When challenged on polygamy, they often defended the practice based on the First Amendment. Later, as interracial marriage and same-sex marriage became more of a public issue, the church opposed the practice based on the laws of God.

=== Polygamy ===
The private practice of polygamy was instituted in the 1830s by founder Joseph Smith. The public practice of plural marriage by the church was announced and defended in 1852 by a member of the Quorum of the Twelve Apostles, Orson Pratt, by the request of church president Brigham Young. For over 60 years, the LDS Church and the United States were at odds over the issue: the church defended the practice as a matter of religious freedom, while the federal government aggressively sought to eradicate it, consistent with prevailing public opinion. Polygamy was probably a significant factor in the Utah War of 1857 and 1858, given the Republican attempts to paint Democratic president James Buchanan as weak in his opposition to both polygamy and slavery. In 1862, the United States Congress passed the Morrill Anti-Bigamy Act, which prohibited plural marriage in the territories. In spite of the law, Mormons continued to practice polygamy, believing that it was protected by the First Amendment. In 1879, in Reynolds v. United States, the Supreme Court of the United States upheld the Morrill Act, stating: "Laws are made for the government of actions, and while they cannot interfere with mere religious belief and opinion, they may with practices." In 1890, church president Wilford Woodruff issued a Manifesto that officially terminated the practice of polygamy. Although this Manifesto did not dissolve existing plural marriages, relations with the United States markedly improved after 1890, such that Utah was admitted as a U.S. state in 1896. After the Manifesto, some Mormons continued to enter into polygamous marriages, but these eventually stopped in 1904 when church president Joseph F. Smith disavowed polygamy before Congress and issued a "Second Manifesto", calling for all plural marriages in the church to cease and established excommunication as the consequence for those who disobeyed.

=== Interracial marriage ===
In reference to interracial marriage, Joseph Smith taught that black and white people should be restricted by law to their own "species". As mayor of Nauvoo, Illinois, Joseph Smith held a trial and fined two black men the modern equivalent of thousands of dollars for trying to marry white women. Brigham Young publicly taught on at least three occasions (1847, 1852, and 1865) that the punishment for black-white interracial marriage was death, and that killing a black-white interracial couple and their children as part of a blood atonement would be a blessing to them. As governor of Utah Territory, he helped pass the Act in Relation to Service, which besides allowing black slavery also banned sexual intercourse between a white person and "any of the African race." The law was expanded by the two-thirds-Mormon state of Utah in 1939 to prohibit a white person from marrying a "Mongolian, a member of the malay race or a mulatto, quadroon, or octoroon." Unlike other states, however, Utah's law said nothing about marriage between white people and Native American people. The laws banning interracial marriage remained until they were repealed by the Utah state legislature in 1963.

Church leaders consistently opposed marriage between different ethnicities. In 1954, apostle Mark E. Petersen taught that segregation was inspired by God, arguing that "what God hath separated, let not man bring together again". He warned that black people were fighting for civil rights so that they could marry white people. Apostle Boyd K. Packer publicly stated in 1977 that "We've always counseled in the Church for our Mexican members to marry Mexicans, our Japanese members to marry Japanese, our Caucasians to marry Caucasians, our Polynesian members to marry Polynesians. ... The counsel has been wise." Nearly every decade for over a century—beginning with the church's formation in the 1830s until the 1970s—has seen some denunciation against miscegenation, with most focusing on black-white marriage.

=== Same-sex marriage ===
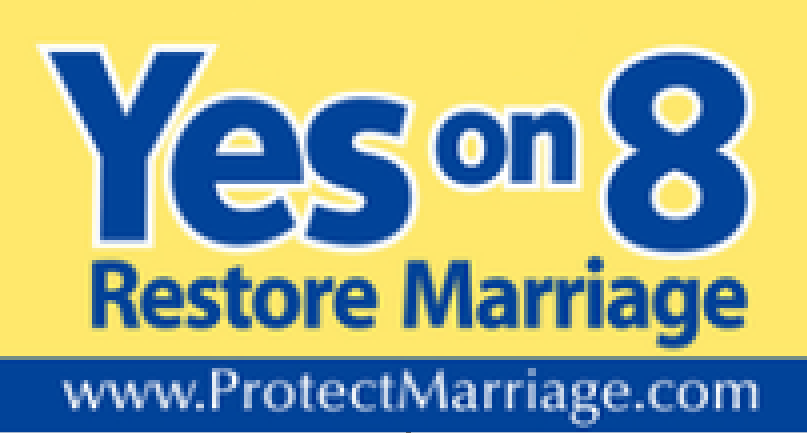
The church distributed hundreds of thousands of these Protect Marriage Coalition lawn signs during their involvement with the pro-Prop 8 campaign.

Beginning in the mid-1990s, the LDS Church began to focus its attention on the issue of same-sex marriages. It officially endorsed a federal amendment to the United States Constitution as well as Utah Constitutional Amendment 3 banning any marriages not between one man and one woman. It opposed same-sex marriage in Hawaii and California and urged its members to donate time and money towards the initiative. In California, church members accounted for 80 to 90 percent of volunteers who campaigned door-to-door and as much as half of the nearly $40 million raised during the campaign on Proposition 8. Members who did not support the church's position could be subject to church discipline, depending on circumstances and the judgement of local leadership. In reference to church involvement with legislation around LGBT people and marriage, the apostle M. Russell Ballard has said the church is "locked in" if anything interferes with the principle of marriage being between a man and a woman; Ballard also stated that a very careful evaluation is made to determine what action is appropriate.

== See also ==
- Black people and Mormonism
