= Joseph Lancaster Brent =

American politician (1826–1905)

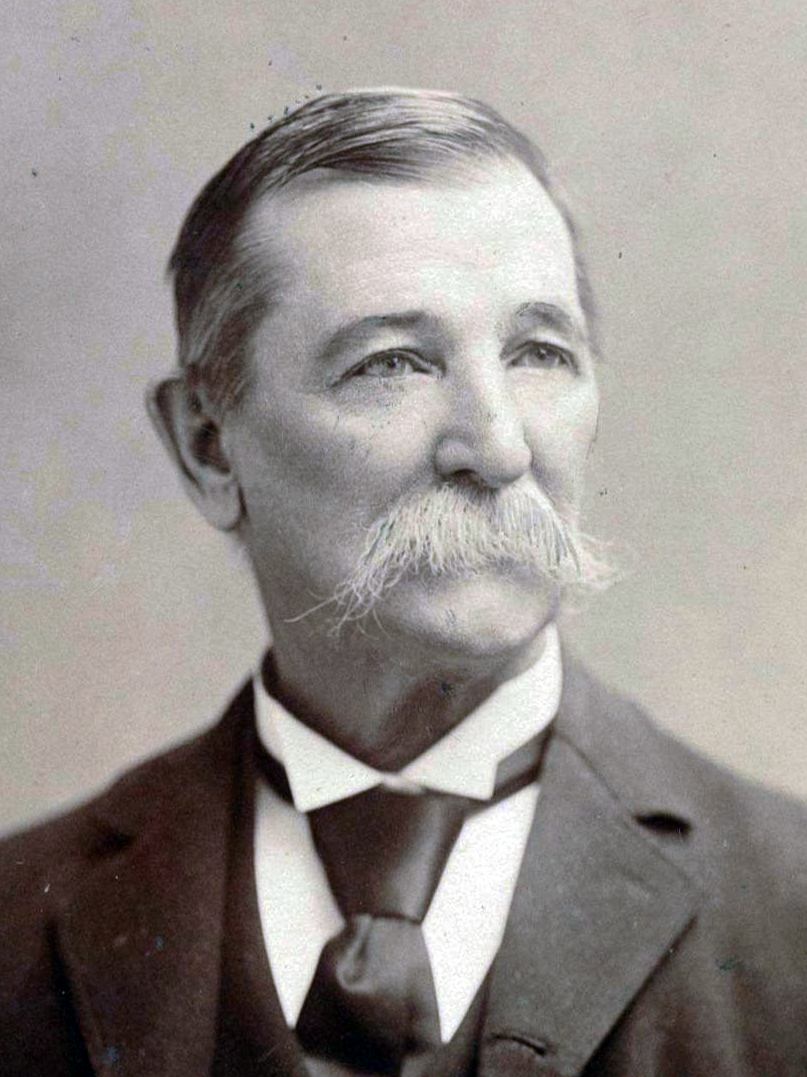
- Born: November 30, 1826; Pomonkey, Maryland, U.S.
- Died: November 27, 1905 (aged 78); Baltimore, Maryland, U.S.
- Burial place: Green Mount Cemetery; Baltimore, Maryland, U.S.
- Military career
- Allegiance: Confederate States of America
- Branch: (Confederate States of America) Confederate States Army
- Service years: 1861–1865
- Rank: Brigadier General (CSA)
- Unit: (California) Los Angeles Mounted Rifles
- Commands: Louisiana Cavalry Brigade (1864–1865)

Member of the California State Assembly for the 1st district
- In office January 7, 1856 – January 5, 1857
- Preceded by: Wilson W. Jones
- Succeeded by: Henry Hancock

3rd and 5th Los Angeles City Attorney
- In office May 4, 1852 – May 4, 1853
- Preceded by: William G. Dryden
- Succeeded by: Charles E. Carr
- In office October 31, 1853 – May 4, 1854
- Preceded by: Charles E. Carr
- Succeeded by: Isaac Hartman

Member of the Los Angeles Common Council
- In office October 17, 1851 – May 4, 1852

Personal details
- Party: Democratic
- Parent: William L. Brent (father)

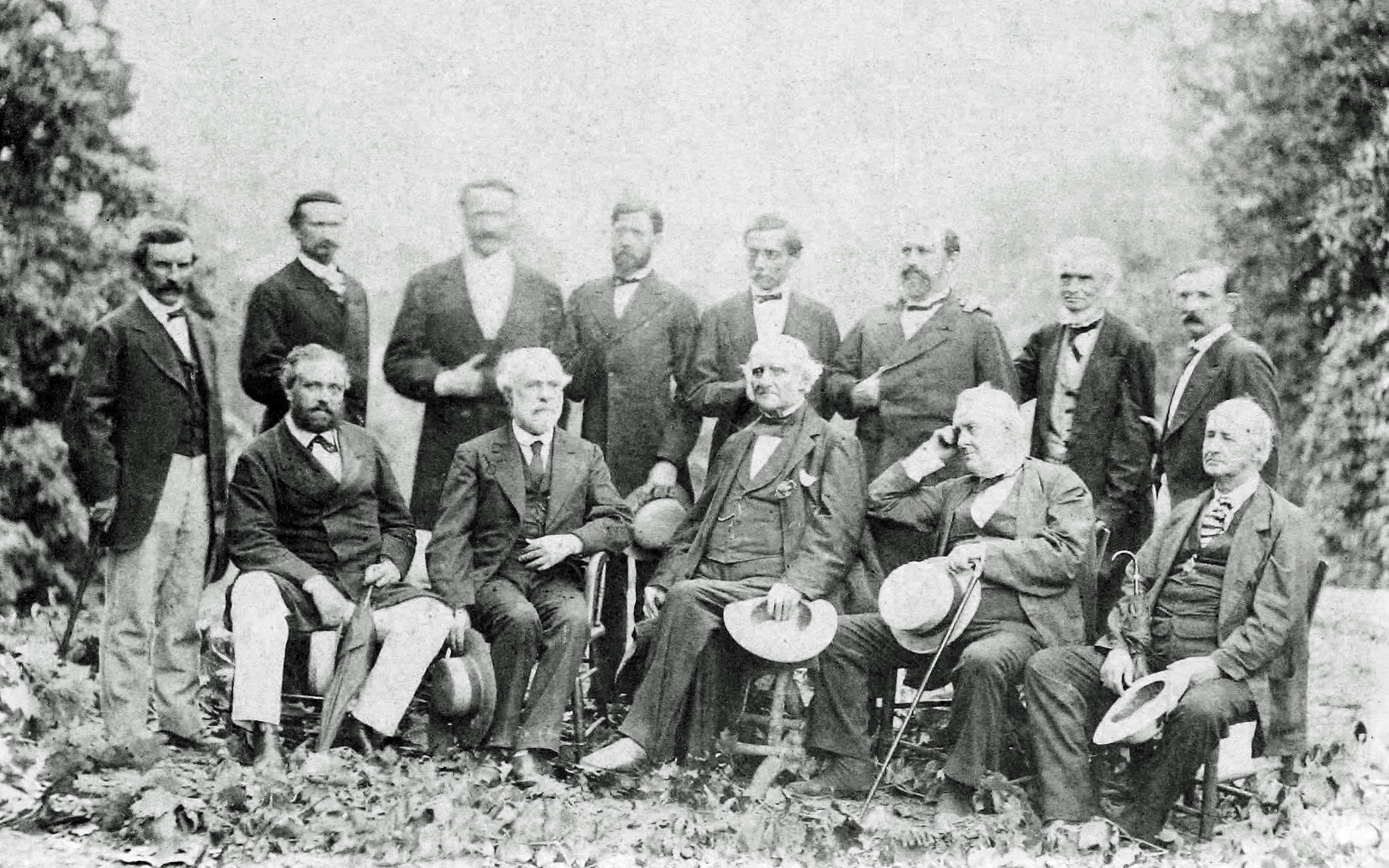
Brent (top row, far right) with Robert E. Lee and Confederate officers, 1869.

Joseph Lancaster Brent (November 30, 1826 – November 27, 1905) was a lawyer and politician in California, Louisiana and Maryland and a brigadier general in the Confederate army.

== Personal ==
Joseph Lancaster Brent was born on November 30, 1826, in Pomonkey, Maryland. His parents were Louisiana's U.S. Congressman William Leigh Brent (a Maryland lawyer) and Maryland heiress Marie Fenwick Brent. The large family included several brothers and sisters, and had many slaves.

He was educated by private teachers and received his legal education at Georgetown University.

In 1870 Brent married Roselle Kenner of Louisiana.

He died on November 27, 1905, in Baltimore, Maryland, and was survived by his wife and two children, Nannie M. and Duncan K. He was buried at Green Mount Cemetery, in Baltimore, Maryland.

== California ==
In 1850 he went to California from Baltimore on a sailing ship bringing his "fairly representative, though inadaquate" law library with him. As an attorney in Los Angeles he "was employed by many rancheros to present and prosecute their Spanish and Mexican land titles." In 1856 he was elected to the State Legislature. He owned Rancho San Rafael, which included the present city of Pasadena, California. The land was located across the Los Angeles River from what is now Griffith Park. He named his property Santa Eulalia Ranch. He was also a school commissioner and a leader of the movement to create a public school system in Los Angeles.

Brent took part in a "Convention of the Delegates from the Southern Counties, in favor of a Division of the State" and was appointed to a committee to draft a concluding resolution, along with Benjamin Hayes, J.S.K. Ogier, Antonio F. Coronel, Ignacio del Valle, Pio Pico and John A. Lewis. The resolution, issued in February 1852, stated that "The fact that each inhabitant of the agricultural sections of the State contributes three dollars to the State Treasury, while the inhabitants of the mining counties, (constituting sixty-five per cent of the entire population of the State) contributes only seventeen cents, portrays in startling colors the oppressive injustice of our present organization."

In 1852, Los Angeles voters elected Brent, a Democrat, as their second city attorney since statehood, and in 1856 he was elected to the California State Assembly.

In mid-February 1861, Joseph Lancaster Brent, as a wealthy attorney and former state legislator of southern sympathies, was one of the prominent Angelenos who signed the petition to form the Los Angeles Mounted Rifles in response to a call by Governor John G. Downey for the formation of militia companies "to preserve order" just before the start of the American Civil War. The Los Angeles Mounted Rifles formed as a secessionist militia, composed of Californios and Americans from the southern states who had settled in Southern California.

== Civil War ==
Following the fall of Fort Sumter, the Los Angeles Mounted Rifles left for Texas, and Federal troops arrived in Los Angeles. Brent decided to return to the east, sold his rancho, and boarded the Panama steamer SS Orizaba at San Diego. On this ship, he joined former U.S. Senator William M. Gwin and former U.S. Attorney Calhoun Benham, also trying to make it back to join the South's war effort. They were, however, arrested in Panama City on a charge of treason, by Brigadier General Edwin Vose Sumner while in Colombian waters. This incident could have involved the United States in a war with Colombia except for the trio giving consent to the arrest in order to avoid any harm to the citizens of Panama City. They were finally released upon order of President Abraham Lincoln.

Brent immediately went to the South to become a major and the ordnance officer for General John B. Magruder on the Virginia Peninsula. He then transferred west as General Richard Taylor's ordnance officer. He was given command of the Louisiana Cavalry Brigade on April 17, 1864, and promoted to brigadier general in October 1864, becoming one of three Californians to become Confederate generals or a diplomat. He fought in Louisiana for the rest of the war.

One of the most interesting events in the war to involve Brent was the sinking of USS Indianola on February 24, 1863.

The Indianola was tasked to interdict the Confederate flow of supplies from the Red River. General Taylor ordered Brent to engage the Union ironclad with two boats, the former tugboat Webb and recently captured paddle steamer Queen of the West. They overtook Indianola and attacked from each side, ramming her seven times before the ironclad ran her bow on the west bank of the river and surrendered. The loss of Indianola was deeply distressing to the Union. It ended Admiral David Dixon Porter's efforts to blockade the Red River by detached vessels while keeping the body of his fleet above Vicksburg, Mississippi, and it prompted Farragut's costly run by the South's forts at Port Hudson, March 14, 1863.

== Postwar ==
After the war, he practiced law in Baltimore, until 1870 when he married Rosella Kenner, daughter of the Louisiana planter and politician, Duncan Farrar Kenner. Brent settled in Louisiana, where he managed Kenner's plantations until the latter's death in 1887. Meanwhile, his wife had a son and daughter. He became a prominent and influential citizen. As a member of the Legislature, he did effective work in fighting the Louisiana lottery. In 1876, he was a delegate to the Democratic National Convention from Louisiana. He was the president of the Maryland Society of Colonial Wars.

Brent returned to Maryland after 1887, and participated in government there. The April 1894 issue of Harper's Magazine published an article by Brent titled "War's Use of the Engines of Peace."

Preceded by William G. Dryden; Charles E. Carr	Los Angeles City Attorney; 1852–53; 1853	Succeeded by Charles E. Carr; Isaac Hartman
