= List of J. Reuben Clark Law School alumni =

J. Reuben Clark Law School alumni
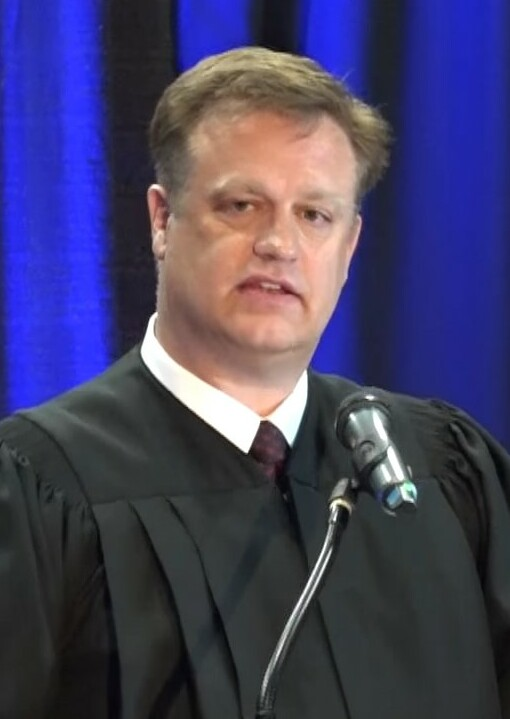
Ryan D. Nelson '99, U.S. Circuit judge

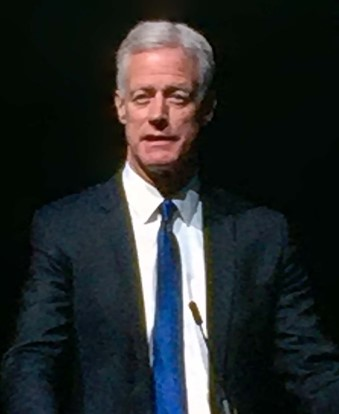
Kevin J Worthen '82, 13th president of Brigham Young University

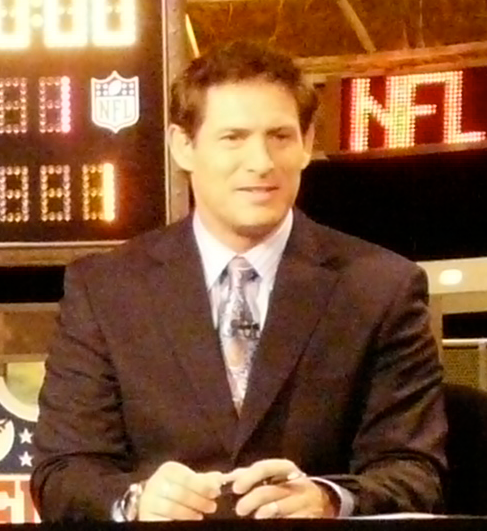
Steve Young '94, NFL Hall-of-Famer and managing director of HGGC

Notable alumni of the J. Reuben Clark Law School (JRCL) at Brigham Young University (BYU).

== Federal judiciary ==
=== U.S. circuit judges ===
- Jay S. Bybee, class of 1980, Court of Appeals for the Ninth Circuit (2003–present)
- Ryan D. Nelson, class of 1999, Court of Appeals for the Ninth Circuit (2018–present)
- N. Randy Smith, class of 1977, Court of Appeals for the Ninth Circuit (2007–present)

=== U.S. district judges ===
- Ann Marie McIff Allen, class of 1997, District of Utah, United States Court (2024–present)
- Dee Benson, class of 1976, District of Utah, United States Court (1991–2020), Foreign Intelligence Surveillance Court (2004–2020)
- Michael W. Mosman, class of 1984, District of Oregon, United States Court (2003–present), Foreign Intelligence Surveillance Court (2013–2020)
- David Nuffer, class of 1978, District of Utah, United States Court (1995–present)
- David Nye, class of 1986, District of Idaho, United States Court (2017–present)
- G. Murray Snow, class of 1984, District of Arizona, United States Court (2008–present)

== State judiciaries ==
=== Supreme court justices ===
- Matthew L. Bell, class of 2003, Utah Supreme Court (2026-present)
- G. Richard Bevan, class of 1987, Idaho Supreme Court (2017–present)
- Jay Jorgensen, class of 1997, Utah Supreme Court (2026-present)
- Gregory W. Moeller, class of 1990, Idaho Supreme Court (2018–present)
- John Nielsen, class of 2007, Utah Supreme Court (2026-present)

=== Court of appeals judges ===
- Brian Y. Furuya, class of 2007, Arizona Court of Appeals (2020-present)
- John Luthy, class of 2000, Utah Court of Appeals (2022–present)
- David Mortensen, class of 1993, Utah Court of Appeals (2016–present)
- Stephen L. Roth, class of 1977, Utah Court of Appeals (2010–2017)
- Ryan Tenney, class of 2003, Utah Court of Appeals (2021-present)
- J. Frederic Voros, Jr., class of 1978, Utah Court of Appeals (2009–2017)

== Politicians ==
=== Federal executive branch ===
- Kathleen Clarke, class of ?, director, United States Bureau of Land Management within United States Department of the Interior (2001–2006)
- David C. Fischer, class of 1973, commissioner, Joint US and Canada International Boundary Commission (1985–1991)

==== United States attorneys ====
- Dee Benson, class of 1976, District of Utah (1989–1991)
- Michael W. Mosman, class of 1984, District of Oregon (2001–2003)
- Monte N. Stewart, class of 1976, District of Nevada (1992–1993)
- Brett Tolman, class of 1998, District of Utah (2006–2009)
- Paul Warner, class of 1976, District of Utah (1998–2005)

=== State executive branch ===
- Becky Harris, class of 1992, chair, Nevada Gaming Control Board (2017–2018); Nevada Senate (2014–2017)
- Mark Hutchison, class of 1990, Lt. Governor of Nevada (2015–2019); Nevada Senate (2013–2014)
- Rory Reid, class of 1988, chair, Clark County Commission (2003–2011); chair, Nevada Democratic Party (1999); and Democratic nominee for governor of Nevada (2010)

==== State attorneys general ====
- John Swallow, class of 1990, Attorney General of Utah (2013); Utah House of Representatives (1997-2003)

=== Federal legislative branch ===
==== United States Senate ====
- Mike Lee, class of 1997, United States Senator (R) from Utah (2011–present)

==== United States House of Representatives ====
- Chris Cannon, class of 1980, United States Representative (R) from Utah (3rd District) (1997–2009)
- Mike Kennedy, class of 2007, United States Representative (R) from Utah (3rd District) (2025–present)
- Celeste Maloy, class of 2015, United States Representative (R) from Utah (2nd District) (2023–present)
- Enid Greene Mickelsen, class of 1983, United States Representative (R) from Utah (2nd District) (1995–1997)
- William H. Orton, class of 1979, United States Representative (D) from Utah (3rd District) (1991–1997)

== Academia ==
- Stephanie H. Barclay, class of 2011, professor of law, Georgetown Law School (2024-present)
- Henry J. Eyring, class of 1989, 17th president, Brigham Young University-Idaho (2017–2023); director, Marriott School of Business MBA Program (1998–2002)
- David H. Moore, class of 1996, dean, J. Reuben Clark Law School (2023-present)
- Rodney K. Smith, class of 1977, 6th president, Southern Virginia University (2004–2011); dean, Alexander Blewett III School of Law (1993–1995)
- Kevin J Worthen, class of 1982, 13th president, Brigham Young University (2014–2023); dean, J. Reuben Clark Law School (2004–2008); distinguished visiting professor of law, Yale Law School (2023-2024)

== Business leaders ==
- Joseph A. Cannon, class of 1977, CEO of Fuel Freedom Foundation; managing editor, Deseret Morning News (2007–2010); chairman, Utah Republican Party (2002–2006)
- Steven J. Lund, class of 1983, founder and CEO of Nu Skin Enterprises and CEO of Nu Skin; Young Men general president of the Church of Jesus Christ of Latter-day Saints (LDS Church) (2020–2025)

== Ecclesiastical leaders ==
- David F. Evans, class of 1979, Emeritus First Quorum of the Seventy
- Von G. Keetch, class of 1987, First Quorum of the Seventy; former chief outside counsel for the LDS Church
- Denise Posse-Blanco Lindberg, class of 1988, judge for Third Judicial District, Utah (1998–2014); general Young Women Board (2014–2018)
- Steven E. Snow, class of 1977, Church Historian and Recorder (2012–2019); White House Office of Faith-Based and Neighborhood Partnerships (2012-2013); Presidency of the Seventy (2007–2012)

== Other alumni ==
- Christy Goldsmith Romero, class of 1995, commissioner, United States Commodity Futures Trading Commission (2022-2025); special inspector general of the Troubled Asset Relief Program (2011-2022)
- Hannah Clayson Smith, class of 2001, former senior counsel for Becket Fund for Religious Liberty
- Karl Tilleman, class of 1990, Canadian Olympian; NBA draft pick; Area Seventy
- Richard E. Turley, Jr., class of 1985, managing director of Public Affairs for the LDS Church (2016–2020); Assistant Church Historian (2008–2016); president of the Genealogical Society of Utah (2000–2008)
- Steve Young, class of 1994, Pro Football Hall of Fame quarterback; ESPN football analyst; managing director of HGGC
