= Von G. Keetch =

American lawyer and Mormon leader

First Quorum of the Seventy
- April 4, 2015 – January 26, 2018
- Called by: Thomas S. Monson

Personal details
- Born: March 17, 1960; Provo, Utah, United States
- Died: January 26, 2018 (aged 57); Salt Lake City, Utah, United States
- Education: Brigham Young University (BA, JD)
- Occupation: Lawyer, law professor

Von Gary Keetch (March 17, 1960 – January 26, 2018) was a general authority of the Church of Jesus Christ of Latter-day Saints (LDS Church) from April 2015 until his death. He was a shareholder in the law firm of Kirton McConkie and a member of the firm's Constitutional, Religious and Appellate Practice section. He defended land use rights of religious groups against state regulations, and argued against liability of religious groups for crimes committed by their members.

== Early life ==
Keetch was born in Provo, Utah. He was also raised in Utah, in Orem and Pleasant Grove. He met Bernice Pymm, whom he would later marry, while they were both in high school. As a young man, he served as a missionary for the LDS Church in the Germany Düsseldorf Mission.

== Education and legal career ==
Keetch held a bachelor's degree from Brigham Young University (BYU) and a law degree from the J. Reuben Clark Law School. He was the managing editor of the BYU Law Review from 1986 to 1987 and was an adjunct law professor at BYU. Keetch served as a law clerk to Judge George C. Pratt of the United States Court of Appeals for the Second Circuit as well as Chief Justice Warren Burger and Justice Antonin Scalia of the United States Supreme Court. Keetch was clerk to Scalia when Scalia wrote the ruling in Employment Division v. Smith, a ruling Keetch subsequently worked to overturn or at least lessen in impact.

Keetch served as a member of Utah's Appellate Court Nominating Commission, a position to which he was appointed by former Utah governor Jon Huntsman, Jr.

While Keetch was an instructor at the J. Reuben Clark Law School, one of his students was Mike Lee.

Keetch, along with Matthew K. Richards, co-wrote "The Need for Legislation to enshrine religious liberty in the Land Use Context". This is one of the leading works cited by religious freedom advocacy groups such as the Becket Fund.

Keetch, along with Kirton McConkie's Alexander Dushku, filed many cases related to the Religious Land Use and Institutionalized Persons Act. In 2007, they presented an amicus curiae brief to the United States Supreme Court in behalf of a large coalition of religious organizations in defense of a broad interpretation of burdening of religious freedom.

== Representing the LDS Church ==
Keetch served for many years as chief outside legal counsel to the LDS Church. He represented the church in cases involving suits over sexual molestation of one member towards another. He was also involved in several other lawsuits along lines related to questions of clerical reporting and responsibility. Keetch was the church's lawyer in a Washington case where the church was sued because a bishop had failed to report accusations of sexual abuse by a girl in his ward, yet Washington law does not require clergy to report such allegations. In 2010 Keetch responded to Marci Hamilton's claims that the LDS response to child sexual abuse was on the same level as that of the Catholic Church. Keetch pointed out the help-line to aid bishops in dealing with abuse, and various other policies and actions the church took on the matter.

Keetch also made statements for the church in regard to the Boy Scouts of America. Keetch was one of the lawyers involved in the LDS Church's attempts to overcome the zoning restrictions in West Linn, Oregon. Keetch filed the amicus briefs in early 2013 for the church in favor of both California Proposition 8 and the Defense of Marriage Act being upheld by the United States Supreme Court as constitutional.

Keetch also served as the LDS Church's lawyer in litigation related to the Main Street Plaza case. He was also involved in the church's 2006 settlement with the ACLU over issues at Martin's Cove in Wyoming.

== LDS Church service ==
Keetch served in a number of positions of lay leadership in the church, including as president of the BYU 14th Stake (from 2002 to 2009) and from 2009 to 2015 as an area seventy in the Fifth Quorum of the Seventy. At the church's April 2015 general conference, he was sustained as a general authority and member of the First Quorum of the Seventy. Keetch worked on inter-faith cooperation with the Evangelical Lutheran Church in America. From 2015 until his death, he served as executive director of the church's Public Affairs Department.

== Personal life ==
Keetch married Bernice Pymm in 1981 and they became the parents of 6 children. After a sudden illness, Keetch died on January 26, 2018.

== See also ==
- List of J. Reuben Clark Law School alumni
- List of law clerks for the chief justice of the United States
- List of law clerks for the ninth seat of the Supreme Court of the United States
