= Major Decisions =

2010 book by Henry J. Eyring

Major Decisions: Taking Charge of Your College Education
- Author: Henry J. Eyring
- Language: English
- Subject: Self-help
- Genre: Non-fiction
- Publisher: Deseret Book
- Publication date: 2010
- ISBN: 978-1-60641-636-5
- Dewey Decimal: 378.1/98 22
- LC Class: LB2343.3.E97 2010

Major Decisions: Taking Charge of Your College Education, published in 2010, is a self-help book written by Henry J. Eyring. Eyring is the 17th president of Brigham Young University–Idaho.

== Purpose ==
The intended purpose of the book is to help both current and prospective college students get the most out of their college experience. "Probably the most important thing I've learned about higher education is this: you can get everything you hope for—and more—if you take personal responsibility for the design and construction of your education. The key is to be your own 'general contractor,' the one who puts all of the pieces of a higher education together according to a careful personal plan."

== General Contractor's Rules ==
The second half of the book features seven rules that each student/prospective student should follow as they seek to become the general contractor of their own education.

- Rule #1: Always Have a Career Dream
- Rule #2: Always Have a Major
- Rule #3: Customize Your Degree
- Rule #4: Find the Best Teachers
- Rule #5: Do Your Best Work
- Rule #6: Connect Your Degree to What Comes Next
- Rule #7: Get All the HSJ Skills You Can

== Royalties ==
Eyring donates all the royalties from his books to the Perpetual Education Fund.

== See also ==
- As a Man Thinketh
