= Mormon Scientist =

Biography of Henry Eyring

- Mormon Scientist cover.
- Author: Henry J. Eyring
- Original title: Mormon Scientist: The Life and Faith of Henry Eyring
- Language: English
- Genre: Biography
- Publisher: Deseret Book
- Publication date: January 2008
- Publication place: United States
- Media type: Print (Hardcover)
- Pages: 320 pp
- ISBN: 978-1-59038-854-9
- OCLC: 180080327
- Dewey Decimal: 289.3092 B 22
- LC Class: Q143.E97 E97 2007

Mormon Scientist: The Life and Faith of Henry Eyring is a book about Henry Eyring, who from 1930 to 1980 made substantial contributions to theoretical chemistry while also speaking and writing extensively about the compatibility of science and religion. The book, written twenty-six years after Eyring's death by his grandson Henry J. Eyring, explores Eyring's contributions to science and religion, his family heritage, and his paradoxical way of thinking. The book was published in January 2008.

== Overview ==
Mormon Scientist draws from Eyring's 88-box archive at the University of Utah’s Marriott Library, as well as from two of his books, The Faith of a Scientist and Reflections of a Scientist. It is divided into four sections: Legacy; Heritage; Paradoxes; and Testament.

=== Legacy ===
Legacy comprises three chapters:

1. Science: a summary of Eyring's scientific career achievements, including the discovery of the Eyring equation and the publication of more than 600 scientific papers.
2. Faith: the story of Eyring's efforts to reconcile scriptural accounts of the Creation with modern scientific findings.
3. Friendship: which includes personal correspondence and accounts of much-publicized annual footraces with his graduate students.

=== Heritage ===
Heritage is four chapters. The first three, Love, Ambition, and Believe, tell the stories of Eyring's parents, maternal grandparents (including Miles Park Romney, great-grandfather of Mitt Romney) and paternal grandparents, respectively. The fourth chapter, Fear, recounts the Eyring family's forced exodus from Mexico during the Mexican Revolution.

=== Paradoxes ===
Paradoxes comprises seven chapters. The first, Master of Contradictions, introduces Eyring's paradoxical way of thinking, which is explored in each of the following six chapters:

1. Humility and Confidence
2. Creativity and Discipline
3. Freedom and Obedience
4. Reasoning, More Than Reasoning
5. Fundamentals, Not Conventions
6. People, Not Public Opinion

=== Testament ===
Testament is just a single chapter, The Kind Father Who Created It All. This chapter recounts Eyring's death from cancer and summarizes his personal philosophy.

== See also ==
- Eyring equation
- Henry B. Eyring
