= Henry J. Eyring =

American academic leader

Henry Johnson Eyring

17th President of Brigham Young University–Idaho
- In office April 10, 2017 – August 1, 2023
- Preceded by: Clark Gilbert
- Succeeded by: Alvin F. Meredith III

Personal details
- Born: September 19, 1963 (age 62) Palo Alto, California, U.S.
- Spouse: Kelly Eyring
- Children: 5
- Parent(s): Henry B. Eyring; Kathleen Johnson Eyring
- Relatives: Henry Eyring (grandfather)
- Education: Brigham Young University (BS, MBA, JD)

Henry Johnson Eyring (born September 19, 1963) is an American academic administrator who served as the seventeenth president of Brigham Young University–Idaho (BYU–Idaho) from 2017 to 2023. From 2019 to 2023, he also served as an area seventy in the Church of Jesus Christ of Latter-day Saints (LDS Church). He previously served as both the academic and advancement vice president at BYU–Idaho, as well as director of the master of business administration (MBA) program in Brigham Young University's (BYU) Marriott School of Business.

== Early life and education ==
Eyring was born in Palo Alto, California, a son of Henry B. Eyring and Kathleen (née Johnson). Eyring's family lived in the San Francisco Bay Area while his father taught at the Stanford Graduate School of Business until 1971, after which they moved to Rexburg, Idaho, where his father was appointed president of Ricks College (now BYU–Idaho). From 1982 to 1984, Eyring served as a full-time missionary for the LDS Church in the Japan Nagoya Mission. Eyring is a graduate of BYU, where he received a bachelor's degree in geology, an MBA, and a JD.

== Career ==
=== Business ===
From 1989 to 1998, Eyring worked at a Cambridge, Massachusetts management-consulting firm, Monitor Group, which was founded in 1983 by six entrepreneurs with Harvard Business School (HBS) ties. He has also served as a director of SkyWest Airlines since 1995. From 2002 to 2003, he was a special partner with Peterson Capital.

=== Academia ===
From 1998 to 2002, Eyring served as director of the MBA program in BYU's business school.

Eyring began working at BYU–Idaho in 2006. He initially served as an associate academic vice president, with responsibility for online learning and instructional technology. From 2008 to 2015, he served as BYU–Idaho's advancement vice president and then as academic vice president from 2015 to 2017.

On February 7, 2017, Dallin H. Oaks of the Quorum of the Twelve Apostles announced that Eyring would succeed Clark Gilbert as president of BYU–Idaho, effective April 10, 2017. He was inaugurated as president on September 19, 2017. Eyring completed his service as BYU-Idaho's president on August 1, 2023.

In 2011, while serving as BYU–Idaho's advancement vice president, Eyring co-authored The Innovative University: Changing the DNA of Higher Education with HBS professor Clayton M. Christensen, discussing the future of higher education and making college economically viable while conducting an in depth look at the histories of Harvard University and BYU-Idaho. Eyring has also served as a trustee of Southern Utah University and is an adjunct fellow at the Clayton Christensen Institute for Disruptive Innovation.

== Personal life ==
Eyring and his wife, Kelly, have five children and reside in Rexburg, Idaho. Eyring's oldest son, Henry, is a BYU–Idaho and HBS graduate and, since August 2022, an assistant accounting professor at Duke University's Fuqua School of Business.

Eyring is a grandson of American theoretical chemist Henry Eyring and wrote a biography of his grandfather entitled Mormon Scientist: The Life and Faith of Henry Eyring. He also co-wrote a biography about his father, Henry B. Eyring, an educational administrator and LDS Church leader, entitled I Will Lead You Along: The Life of Henry B. Eyring.

Eyring's great-great-grandmother was a member of the Romney family.

In addition to his work in academia, Eyring has served in several leadership positions in the LDS Church, including as president of the Japan Tokyo North Mission, bishop, stake president, and area seventy.

== Bibliography ==
Books authored or coauthored by Eyring

- Eyring, Henry J.; Eaton, Robert I. (2013). I Will Lead You Along: The Life of Henry B. Eyring. Deseret Book. ISBN 978-1-60907-783-9. OCLC 1609077830.
- ——; Christensen, Clayton M. (2011). The Innovative University: Changing the DNA of Higher Education. Jossey-Bass. ISBN 978-1-11806-348-4. OCLC 1118063481.
- —— (2010). Major Decisions: Taking Charge of Your College Education. Deseret Book. ISBN 978-1-60641-636-5. OCLC 1606416367.
- —— (2008). Mormon Scientist: The Life and Faith of Henry Eyring. Deseret Book. ISBN 978-1-59038-854-9. OCLC 1590388542.

== See also ==
- List of J. Reuben Clark Law School alumni

Academic offices
| Preceded by Clark G. Gilbert | President of Brigham Young University–Idaho; April 10, 2017 – August 1, 2023 | Succeeded by Alvin F. "Trip" Meredith III |
