= William G. Dryden =

American judge

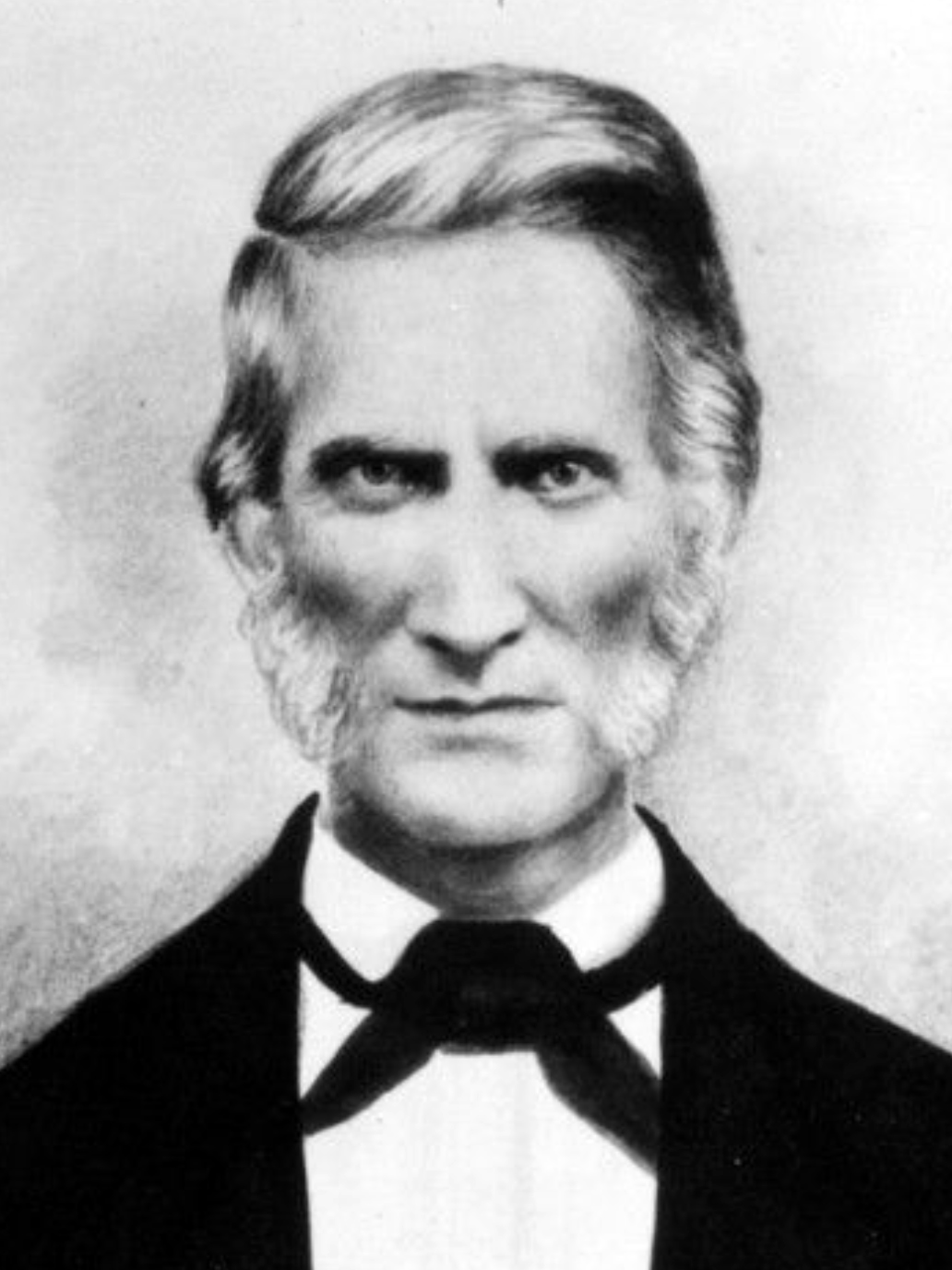

2nd Los Angeles City Attorney
- In office May 7, 1851 – May 4, 1852
- Preceded by: Benjamin Ignatius Hayes
- Succeeded by: Joseph Lancaster Brent

Personal details
- Born: February 11, 1807 Richmond, Kentucky
- Died: September 10, 1869 (aged 62) Los Angeles, California

William G. Dryden (11 February 1807 – 10 September 1869) was a 19th-century lawyer who was a judge and effectively the longest-serving city clerk in the history of Los Angeles, California.

== Personal ==
Dryden was born near Richmond, Kentucky, on February 11, 1807, the son of David H. Dryden. By 1827, he was a trader in New Mexico, and also a militia captain; he was hired by Chihuahua, Mexico, Governor José Calve to build a road in that state. In 1840, after surviving a shipwreck in the Gulf of Mexico, Dryden met Mirabeau Lamar, the president of the independent Republic of Texas and was assigned to recruit agents for a scheme by Lamar and others to annex most of New Mexico. Dryden nominated, allegedly without their consent, American John Rowland and English native William Workman, residents of Taos, as agents of the Texas Republic and its annexation plan, but Rowland and Workman left for Los Angeles in September 1841.

Dryden was arrested by Mexican authorities "because of incriminating documents," and he was jailed in Chihuahua for thirteen months until his release in November 1842. He filed a bill of damages for the imprisonment, but failed to perfect his claim. Afterward, he was an editor of the bilingual Republic of the Rio Grande. He then lived on the Rio Grande near Matamoros and was an interpreter for Colonel David E. Twiggs, commander of the American forces occupying that city during the Mexican–American War.

He was married twice, first to Dolores Nieto in 1851, and second to Ana Josefa (Anita) Dominguez of San Pedro in 1868, when she was about 37 and he was about 69. He had no children from either marriage. He died on September 10, 1869, and was buried with Catholic rites.

== Vocation ==
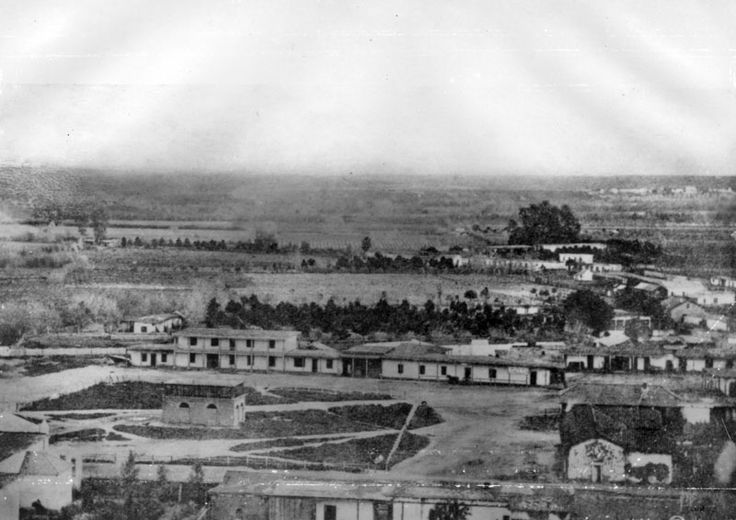
In a photograph of Los Angeles, about 1858, this little brick reservoir in the center of the Los Angeles Plaza was the end point of Dryden's waterworks zanja.

=== Public affairs ===
Dryden arrived in Los Angeles from Texas by way of Mazatlán in 1850 when he was 43 years old. He was soon reunited with Rowland and Workman, whom he represented in the early stages of their land grant claim for the Rancho La Puente in the eastern San Gabriel Valley. In that era, the city and county governments were being organized after the Mexican–American War. Dryden, who was a lawyer, was appointed as secretary to the Los Angeles Common Council to replace Vincente del Campo, the first secretary, who had no legal background; this position effectively was that of a city clerk. Dryden kept this job from November 6, 1850, to May 9, 1860—almost ten years, and then he returned to serve in 1866–69. In the meantime he held other city and county positions as well, leading one historian to call him "the ubiquitous William G. Dryden." His record of holding a multiplicity of public jobs in Los Angeles "therefore remains unique."

In 1851, Los Angeles voters elected Dryden as the city's second city attorney, succeeding Benjamin Hayes. Dryden served one year. A Democrat, he ran for mayor in 1855, but he lost to Thomas Foster by a vote of 192 for Foster and 179 for Dryden.

Dryden was a police judge or a justice of the peace for Los Angeles County in those early years, although the dates are uncertain. In 1856, Dryden was elected Los Angeles County Judge, handling some criminal, as well as major civil and probate cases. He served as county judge until his death in 1869. According to one researcher, Clare Wallace of the Los Angeles Public Library, his judicial service "paralleled the years of violence and lawlessness when Los Angeles earned its reputation of being the toughest frontier town in the West."

An informally voluble, genial, and very profane man, Dryden conducted his courts pretty much after his own personality traits. Lawyers and jurymen appeared coatless, and wearing firearms, if they so desired. Solemnity was lacking. Inkstands, canes, chairs, and jackknives were hurled at opponents during altercations. Judge and attorneys engaged in violent disputes. Dryden himself was guilty of blasphemy from the bench.

Wallace wrote that she had found a "classic anecdote" in more than one source that, when two attorneys drew their "six-shooters" against each other, Dryden "got out of range of the blazing guns" and yelled angrily, "Shoot away damn you! and to hell with all of you!"

Another anecdote, reported in 1900, has Dryden, after a jury rendered a verdict freeing a man who had been accused of horse stealing, speaking to the defendant in Spanish.

The defense attorney asked Dryden what he had said, and he replied: "I told your client, sir, he was discharged and could go about his business." The attorney asked, "What is my client's business?" and, according to the tale, the answer was:

"Horse stealing! horse stealing!! horse stealing!!! by G—, sir," exploded the court, with increasing emphasis and volume on each repetition of the word.

Dryden was appointed to the Board of Education in 1859, 1862–66 and 1868.

=== Private business ===
Dryden built the first waterworks in Los Angeles, which distributed water from springs on his property, through a flume and into a brick reservoir in the Los Angeles Plaza. Frequent damage by floods impelled him to sell the system to a company that included fellow pioneers Prudent Beaudry and Solomon Lazard.

Preceded by Benjamin Hayes	Los Angeles City Attorney; 1851–52	Succeeded by Joseph Lancaster Brent
