= Benjamin Ignatius Hayes =

American lawyer

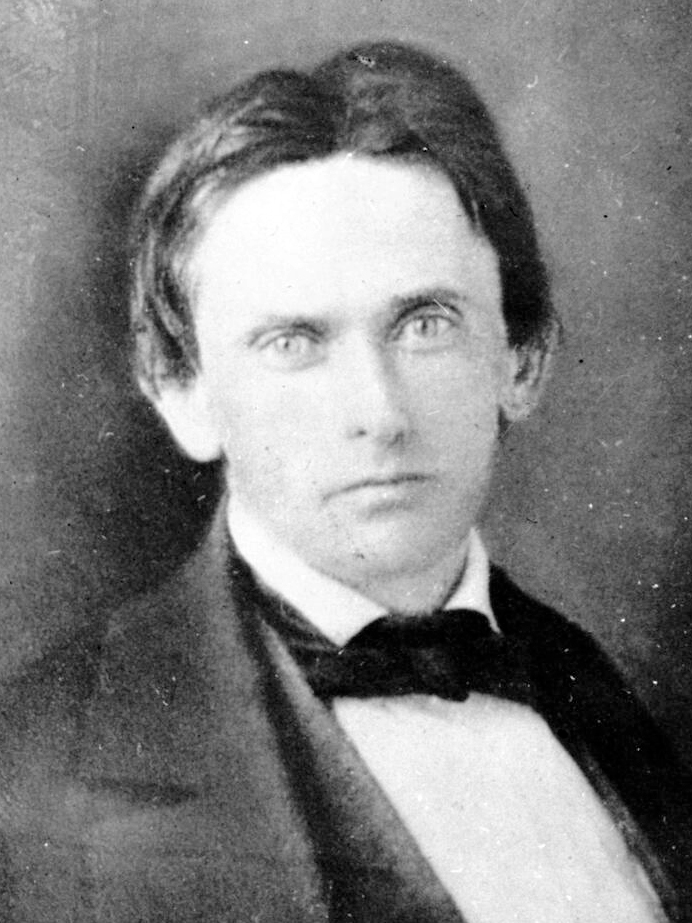
- Hayes in 1849

1st Los Angeles City Attorney
- In office July 3, 1850 – May 7, 1851
- Preceded by: Office established
- Succeeded by: Joseph Lancaster Brent

Personal details
- Born: February 14, 1815 Baltimore, Maryland, U.S.
- Died: August 4, 1877 (aged 62) San Diego, California, U.S.
- Spouse: Emily Martha Chauncey (m. 1848; died 1857) Adelaida Serrano (m. 1866)
- Children: 2
- Relatives: Frederick Eaton (nephew)
- Education: St. Mary's Seminary and University
- Occupation: Lawyer, judge

Benjamin Ignatius Hayes (February 14, 1815 – August 4, 1877) was an American pioneer who was the first judge of the district court that served Los Angeles, San Diego and San Bernardino counties in California. His seminal rulings are still cited in that state's courts.

== Personal ==
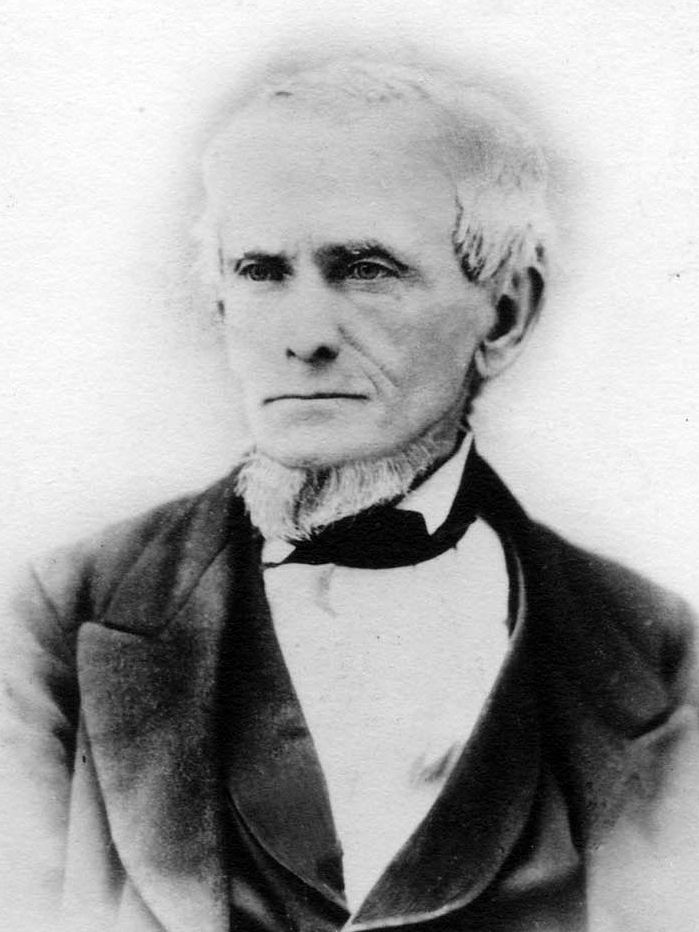
Hayes in 1875.

Hayes was born on February 14, 1815, in Baltimore, Maryland, and graduated from St. Mary's University in that city. Shortly after graduation, he relocated to Missouri, but in 1849 he "set out from Independence, Missouri, for California, riding one mule and leading another packed with supplies for the trip." He joined a train of pioneers and reached a Mormon settlement near San Bernardino, California, in January 1850. He stopped again at Mission San Gabriel and reached the "pueblo of Los Angeles" on February 3, looked around, went back to San Gabriel, sold his mules and returned to stay in the pueblo.

Two of his sisters moved to Los Angeles as well, including Helena, the mother of Fred Eaton.

A Roman Catholic, Hayes was married twice—first, on November 16, 1848, in St. Louis, Missouri, to Emily Martha Chauncey of Harford County, Maryland, who died in 1857, and second, on August 2, 1866, in San Diego, California, to Adelaida Serrano. He had two children, John Chauncey and Mary Adelaida.

Hayes was joined by his wife Emily late in 1851, traveling "by packet to New Orleans, thence by steamer to Panama, which she crossed side saddle on a mule, then by steamer to San Diego." After she died in 1857, the Lafayette Hotel was built on the property, where he reared his son and where Benjamin Hayes died on August 4, 1877.

Hayes was one of the men who helped bring the Sisters of Charity to Los Angeles to establish a hospital. Along with Don Abel Stearns, Hon. Thomas Foster, Don Luis Vignes, Hon. Ezra Drown, Don Antonio F. Coronel, Don Manuel Requena, Don Ignacio del Valle and John G. Downey," he organized a committee to "solicit subscriptions from the citizens of this county" and to "act in co-operation with the Right Rev. Thaddeus Amat, Bishop of Monterey, in all matters necessary" in establishing the hospital." The hospital was the forerunner to today's St. Vincent Medical Center.

== Vocation ==
=== Private practice ===
In the 1840s Hayes began his practice of law in Independence, Missouri, and after arriving in Los Angeles he formed a law partnership with Jonathan R. Scott. He was a member of the Rangers, Los Angeles's first police force, all volunteers.

=== Public service ===
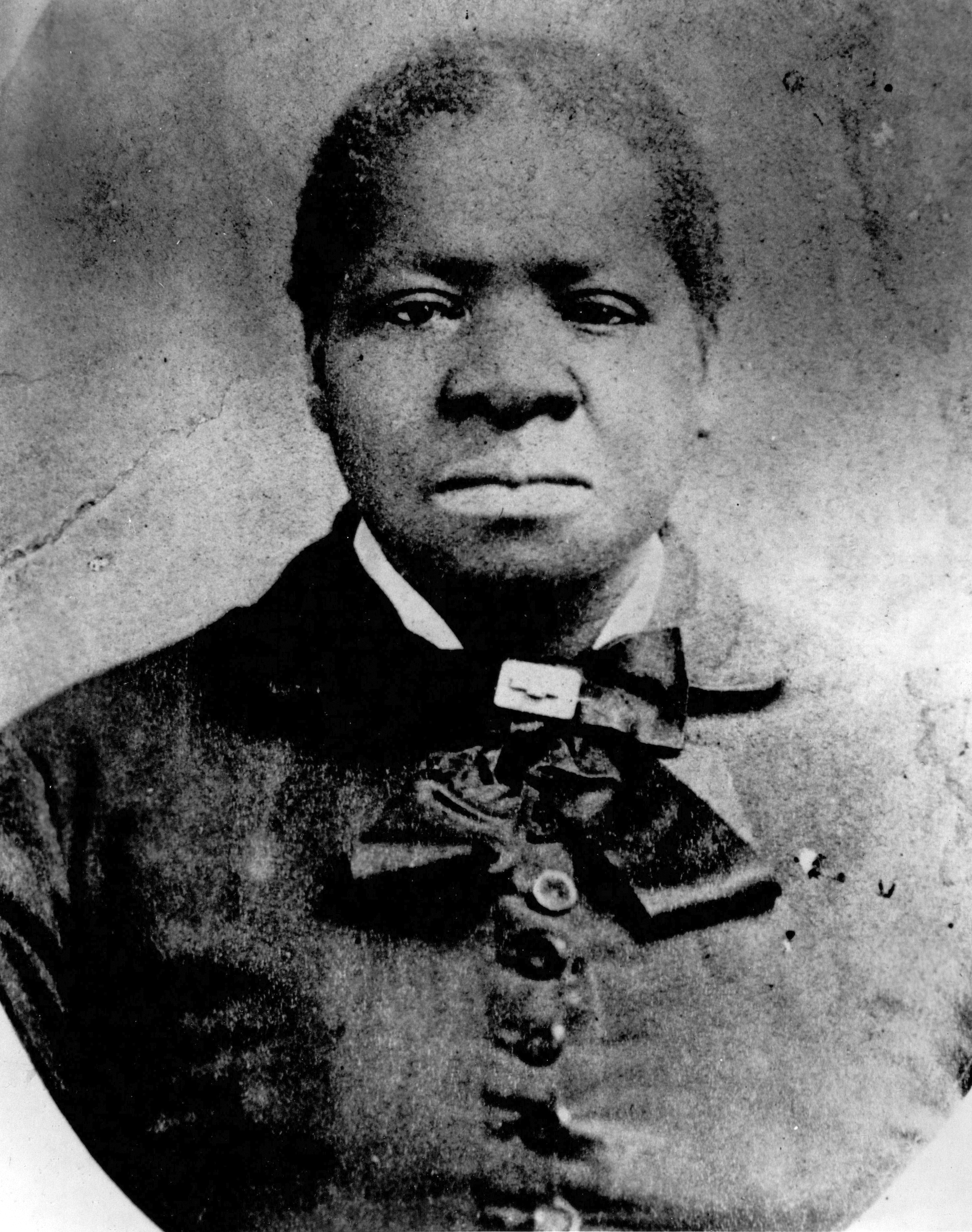
Biddy Mason was one of 14 black people that Hayes freed from Mormons in San Bernardino

In the first Los Angeles County election on April 1, 1850, Hayes, a Democrat, was elected county attorney, "a prosecuting office then provided by law" serving until September 1851. In July of the same year he was elected the first city attorney in Los Angeles, and he served until May 1851.

In 1852 he was elected first judge of the district court that served Los Angeles, San Diego and San Bernardino counties; he was reelected in 1857. Hayes "journeyed over his district on horseback and later by carriage and the little steamer, Senator. Court he convened in whatever available structure there was." In 1856, he freed 14 enslaved black people, including Biddy Mason, who were held in captivity by Mormons in San Bernardino.

Hayes held court in both English and Spanish; he recorded in his diary that he was able to read and write Spanish with competence but that he was not fluent in speaking it. He also found a problem with the lack of lawbooks. One biographer wrote that Hayes "courageously administered justice in the violent Fifties, when mob rule so frequently took matters under its own control." While he was county attorney in 1851[,] a disgruntled litigant on horseback fired at him from three feet away, but the bullet passed harmlessly through Hayes' hat.

Preceded by Office established	Los Angeles City Attorney; 1850–51	Succeeded by William G. Dryden
