= Biddy Mason =

African-American nurse, businesswoman, and philanthropist (1818-1891)

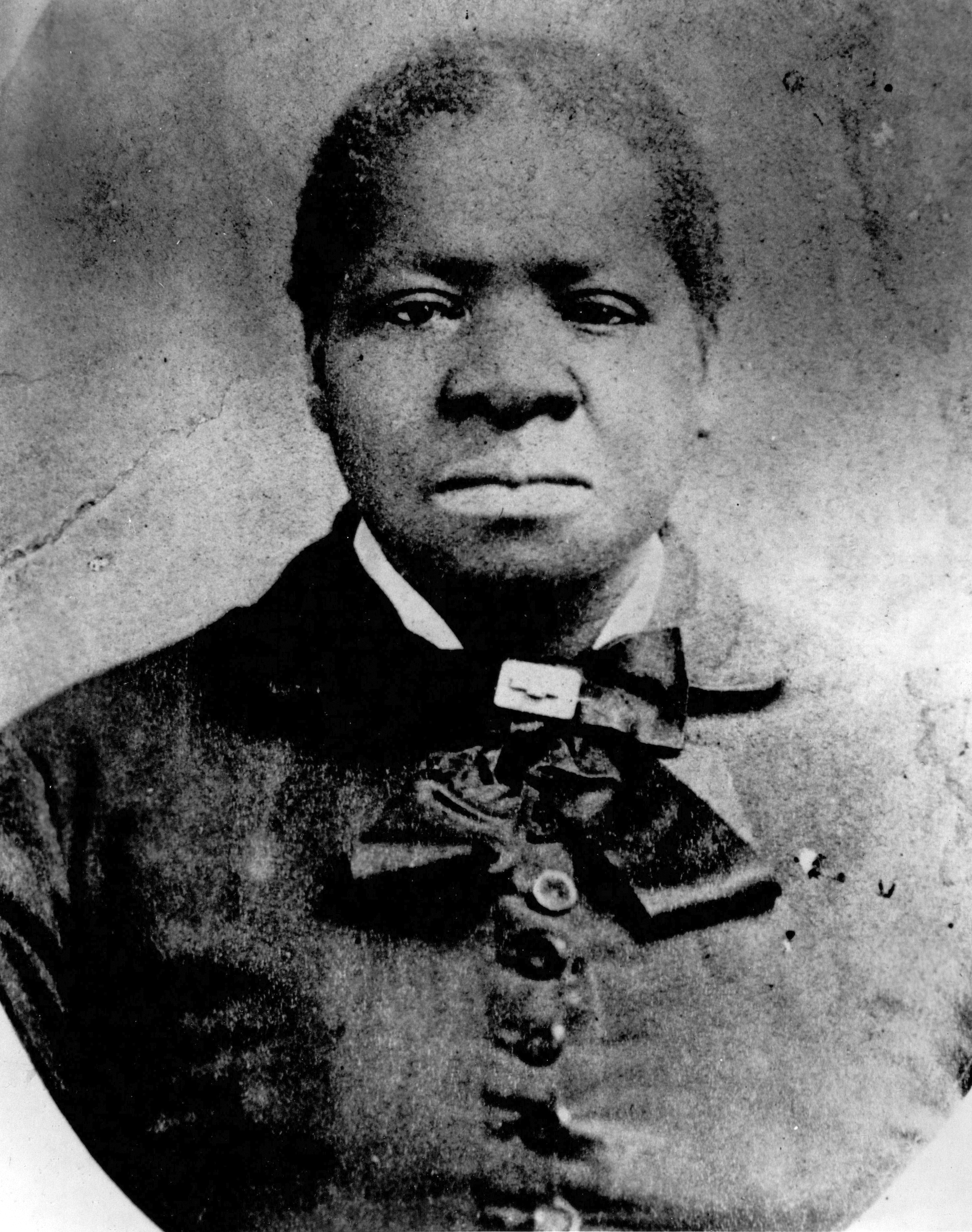
- Born: August 15, 1818; Hancock County, Georgia, US
- Died: January 15, 1891 (aged 72); Los Angeles, California, US
- Occupations: Midwife, California real estate entrepreneur, nurse, philanthropist
- Known for: Philanthropy, Helping found the Los Angeles First A.M.E. Church in Los Angeles, California real-estate entrepreneur
- Biddy Mason Park
- Location: 333 Spring Street; Los Angeles, California
- Coordinates: 34°3′0″N 118°14′53″W

Bridget "Biddy" Mason (August 15, 1818 – January 15, 1891) was an American nurse, midwife, real estate entrepreneur, and philanthropist. Born into slavery, she successfully petitioned a California court for her freedom in 1856 and became one of the first African American women to own land in Los Angeles. Mason was a central figure in the early Black community there and was a founding member of the First African Methodist Episcopal Church (First A.M.E.), the city's oldest African American church.

Born in the American South, Mason was enslaved by Robert Smith, a convert to Mormonism who forced her and her three daughters west during the exodus of the Mormon pioneers. After living in the Utah Territory, the household moved to San Bernardino, California, in 1851. Although California was admitted to the Union as a free state, Smith attempted to hold Mason and her family in captivity and later planned to traffic them to the slave state of Texas. With the aid of the local Black community and legal authorities, Mason petitioned for her liberty. In a landmark 1856 ruling, Judge Benjamin Ignatius Hayes granted freedom to Mason and her extended family, declaring that they could not be held in bondage in a free state.

Following her emancipation, Mason settled in Los Angeles, where she worked as a nurse and midwife, gaining renown for her herbal medical knowledge and service to the poor. Through frugal saving, she purchased property on Spring Street, becoming one of the first Black women in Los Angeles to own real estate. As the city grew, her property value ballooned, allowing her to amass sizable wealth. Mason used her fortune to establish a daycare center, a school for Black children, and the First A.M.E. Church, originally organized in her living room in 1872. Widely respected for her philanthropy, she earned the nickname "Auntie Mason." Today, she is honored with the Biddy Mason Park in downtown Los Angeles, and her legacy is recognized by the California Social Work Hall of Distinction.

== Early life ==
Biddy Mason was born into slavery reportedly on August 15, 1818, in Hancock County, Georgia, but her exact birthplace and birthdate are unknown. During her enslaved teenage years, she was obligated to learn domestic and agricultural skills. Additionally, she developed skills in herbal medicine and midwifery taught to her by other enslaved women. Her knowledge benefited both enslaved people and Southern enslavers. Documentation has never been found of her sale or sales, but at some point Biddy was sold into Mississippi and became the property of Robert Mays Smith and Rebecca Dorn Smith. Biddy was valuable to the Smiths because of her knowledge of medicine, child care, and livestock care.

Biddy had three children: Ellen, born in about 1838; Ann, born in about 1844; and Harriet, born in about 1847. The fathers of her children are unknown, but some authors have speculated that Robert M. Smith likely fathered at least one of her children. An enslaved woman named Hannah Smiley (later Embers) worked with Biddy on the Smith farm. Robert and Rebecca Smith had purchased her from the estate of Rebecca's father. Hannah also had three children when the family left for the West.

== Relocations in 1847 and 1851 ==
Missionaries from the Church of Jesus Christ of Latter-day Saints (Mormons) proselytized in Mississippi. They taught Smith, his wife, and their six children, and they converted in 1847. Enslaved people were only allowed to be preached to and baptized with their owner's permission, according to church policy. It is unknown whether Biddy was baptized.

The Smith household joined a group of other church members from Mississippi as part of the Mormon exodus in 1848. The group departed from Winter Quarters, Nebraska, on July 3, 1848, and arrived in the Salt Lake Valley, Utah Territory, on October 10, 1848. During the journey west, Biddy herded livestock, prepared meals, and midwifed while caring for her own children. Thirty-four enslaved people went with their owners to the Utah Territory. The enslaved people built log cabins, cleared fields, and planted in the town of Cottonwood in the Salt Lake Valley.

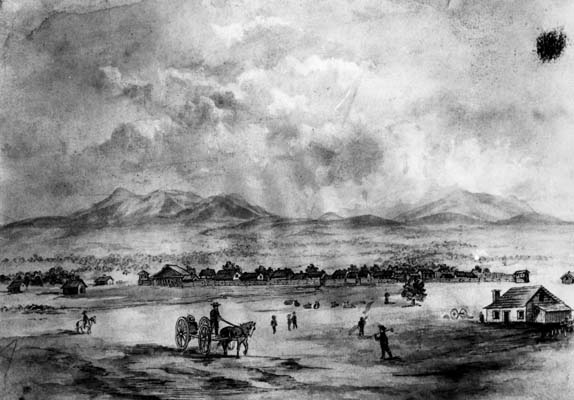
A drawing of San Bernardino, 1852, where she was illegally held captive in a Mormon settlement

Church leader Brigham Young sent a group of Mormons to Southern California in 1851. Young instructed the group that California was a free state, and their slaves would be free when they arrived in California. Robert Smith, the people he enslaved, and his family settled in San Bernardino, California. Biddy was among a number of enslaved people in the San Bernardino settlement. As part of the Compromise of 1850, California was admitted as a free state. Nevertheless, some migrants from the South, including Robert Smith, continued to bring enslaved people into the state. California's courts routinely ruled against the freedom claims of enslaved African Americans in support of slave owners. Biddy was under the control of Robert Smith and ignorant of the laws and her rights.

== Freedom ==
In 1856, Smith decided to move to the slave state of Texas and sell his slaves there. He told his slaves that they would be free in Texas. To two free Black men—Charles Owens and Manuel Pepper—Biddy relayed her fears of being separated from her children and remaining enslaved. The men, including sheriffs and others, served Smith with a court order. A Los Angeles court heard the habeas corpus action regarding her freedom. Smith claimed that Biddy wanted to go to Texas. He then bribed her lawyer to not show up. She was not allowed to testify in court since California law prohibited black people from testifying against white people. After Smith failed to appear in court on January 21, 1856, the judge presiding over the case, Benjamin Ignatius Hayes, freed Biddy and her family members. In 1860, she received a certified copy of the document that guaranteed her freedom.

Like every enslaved person, Biddy had no legal last name when she was enslaved. After she became free, she used the last name Biddy Mason. Authors occasionally speculate that she took the name in homage to Apostle Amasa Mason Lyman, but the name "Mason" was more likely her original family name from Hancock County, Georgia.

== Los Angeles ==
After becoming free, Mason and her daughters moved in with Robert Owens, the father of Charles Owens and a well-known Los Angeles businessman. Her daughter Ellen would eventually marry Charles Owens. Mason worked in Los Angeles as a nurse and midwife, delivering hundreds of babies during her career. Using her knowledge of herbal remedies, she risked her life to care for those affected by the smallpox epidemic in Los Angeles. One of her employers was the noted physician John Strother Griffin.

Saving carefully, she was one of the first African American women to own land in Los Angeles. As a businesswoman, she amassed a relatively large fortune, which she shared generously with charities. Mason fed and sheltered the poor and visited prisoners. She was instrumental in founding a traveler's aid center and a school and day care center for black children, open to any child who had nowhere else to go. Because of her kind and giving spirit, many called her "Auntie Mason" or "Grandma Mason".

In 1872, along with her son-in-law Charles Owens and other Black residents of Los Angeles, Mason was a founding member of First African Methodist Episcopal Church of Los Angeles, the city's first Black church. The organizing meetings were held in her home on Spring Street. She donated the land on which the church was built. She also helped to establish the first elementary school for black children in Los Angeles.

Mason spoke fluent Spanish and was a well-known figure in the city. She dined on occasion at the home of Pio Pico, the last governor of Alta California and a wealthy Los Angeles land owner.

== Family ==
Mason's daughter Ellen married Charles Owens and had two sons, Robert Curry Owens (1859-1932) and Henry Louis Owens (1861-1893). For many decades, Robert Curry Owens was noted as the wealthiest Black man in Los Angeles. Henry L. Owens died in 1893.

Later in life, Robert Curry Owens engaged in politics and real estate. He went on to own the Owens Block, a two-story brick building built on Broadway in the early 1890s that became the first Black-owned business building in Downtown Los Angeles.

== Legacy ==
Mason was fond of saying,

"If you hold your hand closed, nothing good can come in. The open hand is blessed, for it gives in abundance, even as it receives."

After Mason's death on January 15, 1891, she was buried in Evergreen Cemetery in the neighborhood of Boyle Heights. On March 27, 1988, in a ceremony attended by the mayor of Los Angeles and members of the church she founded, her burial place was marked with a gravestone.

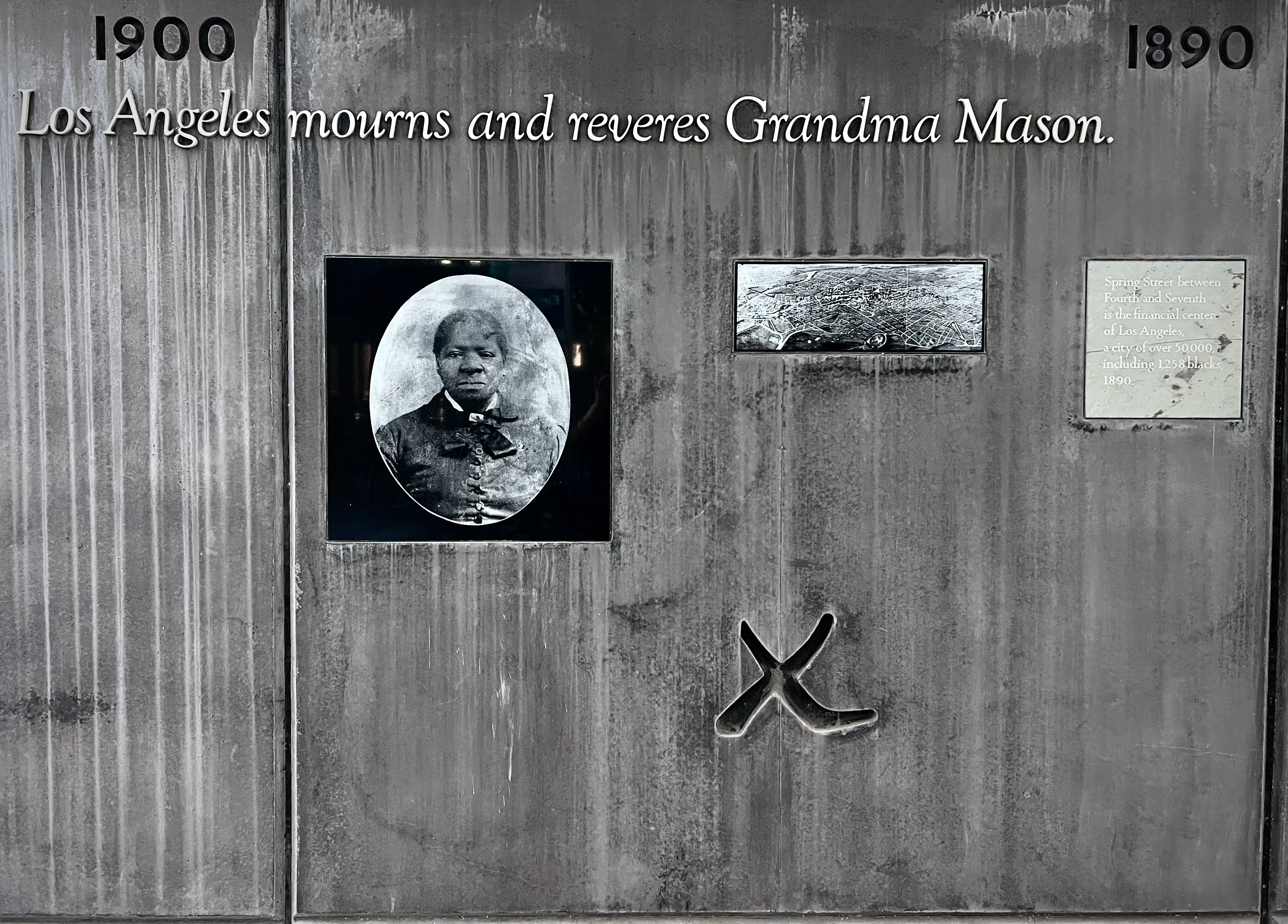
Near the site of Mason's home lies the 82-foot-long (25 m) installation in her honor. The concrete wall contains embedded objects that tell the story of Mason's life.

Mason was celebrated on Biddy Mason Day on November 16, 1989. A ceremony at the Broadway Spring Center unveiled a memorial to highlight her achievements. The site near Mason's home in downtown Los Angeles is an art installation describing her life. Artist Sheila Levrant de Bretteville designed an installation called Biddy Mason's Place: A Passage of Time. It is an 82-foot-long (25 m) concrete wall embedded with objects that tell the story of Mason's life.

Mason is featured in a mural by Bernard Zakheim originally installed in Toland Hall Auditorium at the University of California, San Francisco, during the 1930s. The painting, along with others in the series, was removed from the building before it was demolished as part of a campus upgrade. Mason is an honoree in the California Social Work Hall of Distinction.

In June 2024, Los Angeles City Councilmember Kevin de León introduced a motion to rename Pershing Square "Biddy Mason Park" after Mason. However, the motion stalled in committee, but would later be reintroduced by de León's successor, Ysabel Jurado, in August 2026. The city council unanimously approved the motion in September 2026.

== See also ==
- History of African Americans in Los Angeles
- History of slavery in California
- Mormonism and slavery
