= 2004 Utah Constitutional Amendment 3 =

Constitutional Amendment 3
- November 2, 2004
- Utah Marriage Amendment

Results
Choice	Votes	%
Yes	593,297	65.86%
No	307,488	34.14%
Valid votes	900,785	95.62%
Invalid or blank votes	41,225	4.38%
Total votes	942,010	100.00%
Registered voters/turnout	1,278,251	70.47%
County results
Yes
80–90%
70–80%
60–70%
50–60%
No
60–70%
50–60%

Utah Constitutional Amendment 3 was an amendment to the Utah state constitution that sought to define marriage as a union exclusively between a man and woman. It passed in the November 2, 2004, election, as did similar amendments in ten other states.

The amendment, which added Article 1, Section 29, to the Utah Constitution, reads:

1. Marriage consists only of the legal union between a man and a woman.
2. No other domestic union, however denominated, may be recognized as a marriage or given the same or substantially equivalent legal effect.

On December 20, 2013, federal judge Robert J. Shelby of the U.S. District Court for Utah struck down Amendment 3 as unconstitutional under the Due Process and Equal Protection clauses of the U.S. Constitution.

== Background ==
Both pro and anti amendment groups formed to sway voters. The "Don't Amend Alliance" organized in spring, much earlier than pro-amendment groups. The Alliance raised hundreds of thousands of dollars, catching supporters of the amendment by surprise. They responded with the "Yes! For Marriage" group, which only began a coordinated campaign on October 5. Nonetheless, latent support for the amendment appeared high with over 60% support for the Amendment in a Salt Lake Tribune poll conducted early October.

The Church of Jesus Christ of Latter-day Saints (LDS church), though not officially endorsing the amendment, publicized a statement in July endorsing constitutional amendments that define marriage. On October 20, just 13 days before Utahns voted on the amendment, the LDS church officially stated that "Any other sexual relations, including those between persons of the same gender, undermine the divinely created institution of the family. The Church accordingly favors measures that define marriage as the union of a man and a woman and that do not confer legal status on any other sexual relationship." Supporters of the amendment asserted the second statement showed specific LDS support for Amendment 3. Others, including moderately conservative Latter-day Saint KSL radio talk show host Doug Wright, believed that since the new statement applied only to "sexual relations" it highlighted precisely how Amendment 3 went too far.

The Episcopal church publicly opposed the amendment.

Three candidates for Utah Attorney General, including incumbent Republican Mark Shurtleff, issued a joint statement opposing the amendment on August 6. In many other political races, notably the gubernatorial race, candidates weighed in on this issue.

On November 2, 2004, Amendment 3 was approved by 66% of Utah voters, (rejected in two counties) in a closer than expected race. Governor Huntsman proposed reciprocal benefits for gay couples in reaction. The reciprocal beneficiary measure failed in the Utah Senate during the 2005 legislative session on a ten in favor to eighteen opposed poll.

On December 20, 2013 Amendment 3 was ruled unconstitutional by Federal District Court Judge Robert J. Shelby in Salt Lake City. The state government is expected to appeal.

On January 6, 2014 the United States Supreme Court issued a stay of Judge Shelby's ruling "pending final disposition," according to the order. The Court's order reinstates the state Constitutional ban and will keep it intact until after a federal appeals court has ruled on it. The order appeared to have the support of the full Court, since there were no noted dissents.

== Arguments for Amendment 3 ==
Supporters of Amendment 3 said that the amendment would do three things:

1. Prevent state courts from making a ruling that current Utah marriage legislation as being unconstitutional.
2. Prevent state courts from forcing recognition of out-of-state marriages.
3. Prevent the creation of "counterfeit marriages", such as civil unions.

They also said the amendment would not hurt heterosexual marriage, common-law marriages, or the right to will property to whomever one wishes.

== Arguments against Amendment 3 ==
Those opposed to the amendment say that section one of the amendment is completely unnecessary since Utah already outlaws same-sex marriage. They also say the second part of the amendment "goes too far". They feel that it would invalidate common-law marriage as well as reducing rights to will property to whomever one chooses.

== Results ==
Amendment 3
Choice	Votes	%
For	593,297	65.86
Against	307,488	34.14
Total	900,785	100.00
Registered voters/turnout	1,574,463	57.21

On November 2, 2004 Amendment 3 passed by a margin of 65.8% to 33.2%. Results were 593,297 votes for and 307,488 votes against the amendment. The amendment went into effect on January 1, 2005. Utah courts in 2006 ruled that the amendment does not ban domestic partnerships and allowed Salt Lake City's domestic partnership registry to stand. In 2009, Utah Governor Jon Huntsman indicated it was his belief the amendment would not ban civil unions.

County	Yes Yes vote	No No vote	Final outcome
Wasatch metropolitan area:
Davis	71% (75,780)	29% (31,524)	Yes Yes
Salt Lake	54% (190,364)	46% (159,605)	Yes Yes
Summit	39% (5,696)	61% (9,079)	No No
Tooele	64% (10,399)	36% (5,886)	Yes Yes
Utah	82% (119,948)	18% (26,290)	Yes Yes
Weber	62% (43,885)	38% (26,894)	Yes Yes
Rest of state:
Beaver	76% (1,851)	24% (572)	Yes Yes
Box Elder	76% (13,707)	24% (4,246)	Yes Yes
Cache	75% (29,137)	25% (9,832)	Yes Yes
Carbon	61% (4,929)	39% (3,101)	Yes Yes
Daggett	72% (340)	28% (130)	Yes Yes
Duchesne	80% (4,288)	20% (1,076)	Yes Yes
Emery	77% (3,483)	23% (1,039)	Yes Yes
Garfield	77% (1,599)	23% (467)	Yes Yes
Grand	46% (1,840)	54% (2,163)	No No
Iron	78% (11,625)	22% (3,364)	Yes Yes
Juab	74% (2,437)	26% (870)	Yes Yes
Kane	72% (2,080)	28% (792)	Yes Yes
Millard	81% (3,844)	19% (894)	Yes Yes
Morgan	75% (2,866)	25% (941)	Yes Yes
Piute	79% (584)	21% (159)	Yes Yes
Rich	76% (772)	24% (248)	Yes Yes
San Juan	78% (3,243)	22% (897)	Yes Yes
Sanpete	79% (6,518)	21% (1,753)	Yes Yes
Sevier	80% (5,957)	20% (1,498)	Yes Yes
Uintah	77% (7,337)	23% (2,135)	Yes Yes
Wasatch	67% (4,907)	33% (2,429)	Yes Yes
Washington	78% (32,946)	22% (9,217)	Yes Yes
Wayne	71% (935)	29% (387)	Yes Yes

== Court challenge ==
On March 25, 2013, three same-sex couples, including one already married in Iowa, filed a lawsuit in the United States District Court for the District of Utah seeking to declare Utah's prohibition on the recognition of same-sex marriages unconstitutional under the Due Process and Equal Protection clauses of the United States Constitution. The court heard arguments on December 4. The state argued that there was "nothing unusual" in enforcing policies that encourage "responsible procreation" and the "optimal mode of child-rearing". Plaintiffs' attorney contended that the policy is "based on prejudice and bias that is religiously grounded in this state".

On December 20, 2013, District Judge Robert J. Shelby struck down the same-sex marriage ban as unconstitutional and violating same-gender couples' their rights to due process and equal protection under the Fourteenth Amendment. The ruling prevents the State from enforcing Sections 30-1-2 and 30-1-4.1 of the Utah Code and Article I, § 29 of the Utah Constitution to the extent these laws prohibit a person from marrying another person of the same sex. Historian J. Seth Anderson and neuroscientist Michael Ferguson were the first same-sex couple legally married in Utah on Dec. 20, 2013. State Senator Jim Dabakis and his partner of 27 years were among the first same-sex couples to marry in the state.

Same sex marriages were performed in Salt Lake, Washington and Cache counties on December 20. Other counties declined to grant same-sex couples their request. At least one same-sex couple planned to camp overnight at the Salt Lake County Clerk's Office in anticipation of it opening at 8 a.m., one hour before the 9 a.m. hearing scheduled to hear a Motion for Stay submitted by the State of Utah in the 10th District Court. An Emergency Motion to Stay, which would have granted a stay pending the ruling on the stay that is the subject of a hearing scheduled for December 23, was denied December 22.

The United States Supreme Court issued an order on Monday, January 6, 2014, that halted same-sex marriages until an appeal is decided by the U.S. Court of Appeals for the Tenth Circuit.

On January 16, Attorney General Sean Reyes named Gene C. Schaerr, former law clerk to Supreme Court Justices Warren Burger and Antonin Scalia, as lead outside counsel to make Utah's case to the Tenth Circuit. Schaerr was to be aided in the appeal by former Michigan Solicitor General John Bursch and Idaho Attorney (and former U.S. Attorney for the District of Nevada), Monte N. Stewart.

That same day, the Utah State Tax Commission announced that it will allow married same-sex couples to file joint income tax returns for 2013.

The Tenth Circuit heard oral argument on April 10, 2014. On June 25, 2014, a three-judge panel consisting of Judges Paul Joseph Kelly, Jr., Carlos F. Lucero, and Jerome Holmes of the Tenth Circuit affirmed the district court's ruling in a 2-1 decision. Judge Lucero wrote the majority opinion and was joined by Judge Holmes, with Judge Kelly authoring a dissent. The ruling was immediately stayed pending appeal. On August 5, Utah appealed the ruling to the United States Supreme Court.

On October 6, 2014, the Supreme Court denied to review Kitchen, allowing the Tenth Circuit's decision to become final. Thus, Utah was required to immediately begin licensing and recognizing same-sex marriages. This decision also became binding on federal courts throughout the Tenth Circuit, including Oklahoma, Kansas, Wyoming, Colorado, and New Mexico (the only state that already allowed same-sex marriage prior to Kitchen).

== See also ==
- Same-sex marriage in the United States
- Same-sex marriage legislation in the United States
- Same-sex marriage in the United States by state
- Same-sex marriage in the United States public opinion
- Same-sex marriage status in the United States by state
- List of benefits of marriage in the United States
- Defense of Marriage Act
- Marriage Protection Act
- U.S. state constitutional amendments banning same-sex unions
- Federal Marriage Amendment
- Domestic partnerships in the United States
- Freedom to Marry Coalition
- History of civil marriage in the U.S.
