= Monte N. Stewart =

American lawyer

Monte Neil Stewart
- Born: 1949 (age 76–77)
- Education: Brigham Young University (B.A., J.D.); University of Oxford (M.St.)
- Occupation: Attorney
- Spouse: Anne Lillywhite Stewart
- Children: 10

Monte Neil Stewart (born 1949) is the founding president of the Marriage Law Foundation, the former U.S. attorney for Nevada, and a former special assistant attorney general and counsel to the governor of Utah.

== Early life and education ==
Stewart was born in St. George, Utah to Neil Stewart and his wife Velma Heaton.

Stewart received his B.A. from Brigham Young University, summa cum laude, in 1973. He attended J. Reuben Clark Law School as well, graduating summa cum laude and first in his class in 1976, after which he clerked for United States Circuit Judge John Clifford Wallace of the United States Court of Appeals for the Ninth Circuit and then Chief Justice Warren Burger of the United States Supreme Court. In 2004, Stewart received a M.St. with distinction from University of Oxford in legal research.

== Career ==
From 1992 to 1993 Stewart served as United States Attorney for the District of Nevada pursuant to a rare appointment by the Federal Judges of that District, and later was a legal advisor to Governor Michael Leavitt of Utah from 2001 to 2003.

Stewart has been involved in private practice and was for a time a law professor at J. Reuben Clark Law School at BYU.

In 2004 Stewart was a co-chair of Utahns for a Better Tomorrow, one of the four sponsors of Utah Amendment 3 which limited marriage to male-female couples and prevented the recognition of civil unions or domestic partnerships.

Stewart has used social institutions theory in many papers to argue against same-sex marriage. Among many other participations, Stewart was an invited participant in a Vermont Law School meeting on marriage and family in October 2007. An article by him also appeared in the Harvard Journal of Law and Public Policy Vol. 31, no. 1. Stewart also wrote a biography of Jesse Lamb Stewart.

Stewart filed amicus curiae briefs in California's In Re Marriage Cases litigation and in Iowa's Varnum v. Brien case on behalf of United Families International, Family Watch International and the Family Leader Foundation. In late 2013 Stewart was hired by Utah Attorney General Sean Reyes to act as the state's agent in defending the ban on same sex marriage.

== Personal life ==
Stewart and his wife, the former Anne Lillywhite, are the parents of ten children.

== See also ==
- List of law clerks for the chief justice of the United States
- List of J. Reuben Clark Law School alumni
