= Dan Jones bibliography =

This is a list of writings by Latter-day Saint missionary Dan Jones. Jones served as mission president of the Welsh Mission twice. He led two emigration parties from Wales to the Salt Lake Valley in Utah. He was an ardent missionary and defender of his faith and much of his writing and correspondence centers on Mormonism.

== Periodicals ==
- Prophet of the Jubilee, or, Star of the Saints. Monthly. Rhydybont, Wales. John Jones. (ed.) 1846–1848.
- Zion's Trumpet, or, Star of the Saints. Merthyr Tydfil, Wales. Edited by John S. Davis. 1849.

== Published works ==
Many of these works were translated and edited, with commentary, in the book Defending the Faith. Early Welsh Missionary Publications. They are also referenced in the bibliographic book Welsh Mormon Writings From 1844 to 1862. A Historical Biography by Ronald D. Dennis.

- The dead raised to life. Wrexham, Wales. William Bayley. April 4, 1845.
- A defense of the Saints versus the accusations of Thomas Jones. Rhydybont, Wales. John Jones. 1846.
- A reply to the objections which are most commonly brought throughout the country against the Latter-day Saints. Rhydybont, Wales. John Jones. 1846.
- The scales, in which are seen David weighing Williams. Rhydybont, Wales. John Jones. 1846.
- A review of the lectures of the Rev. E. Roberts. Rhydybont, Wales. John Jones. 1847.
- A defense of the Saints against the false accusations of those who call themselves "Cuckoo of Ton". Rhydybont, Wales. January 1847.
- "Haman" hanging from his own gallows! or, Daniel Jones (the blind). Rhydybont, Wales. John Jones. 1847.
- History of the Latter-day Saints, from their establishment in the year 1823. Rhydybont, Wales. John Jones. 1847.
- Three letters from Capt. D. Jones, and one from Mrs. Lewis. Merthyr Tydfil, Wales. John Davis. 1850.
- A defense of the Saints : refutations of the false and malicious accusations of a man by the name of Rees Davies. Swansea, Wales. D. Jones. 1854.
- Proclamation to priests, reverends, preachers, and all teachers. Merthyr Tydfil, Wales. D. Jones. 1854.
- Atheism of sectarianism!. Merthyr Tydfil, Wales. D. Jones. 1854.
- A debate between a Baptist and an atheist. Merthyr Tydfil, Wales. D. Jones. 1854.
- Do not listen to them. Swansea, Wales. D. Jones. 1854.
- Unpopularity of "Mormonism"?. Swansea, Wales. D. Jones. 1855.
- The guide to Zion. Swansea, Wales. D. Jones. 1855.

== Correspondence ==
Jones corresponded with many early Latter-day Saint Church leaders, including Joseph Smith, Brigham Young, Wilford Woodruff, Orson Spencer, Orson Hyde, and Samuel W. Richards. Several of these men were heavily involved in the Welsh Mission. A selection of these letters is available on The Welsh Saints Project.
