= Pacific Islanders and Mormonism =

Region of missionary activity

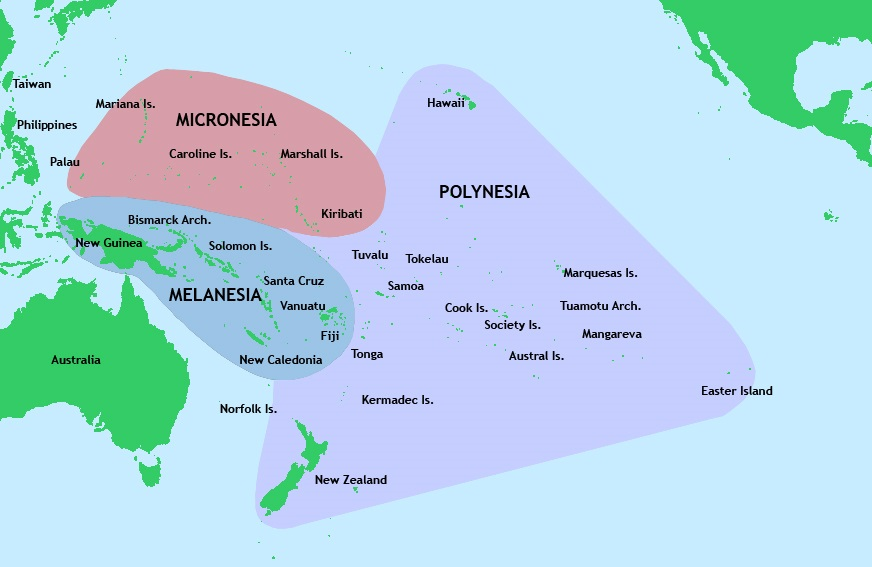
Three of the major groups of islands in the Pacific Ocean

Pacific Islanders have a particular place in the history of the Church of Jesus Christ of Latter-day Saints (LDS Church). Its first non-English-speaking mission was in the region in 1844, less than twenty years after the church's founding, and there are currently six temples among the Pacific Island regions of Polynesia, Melanesia, and Micronesia. In 2015 the Latter-day Saint population in the area was increasing in percentage and absolute numbers.

Since the 1850s Mormon leaders have identified Polynesian islands with the "islands of the sea" marked in their scriptures for missionary activity, and taught that the people there were descendants of Israelite people from the faith's canonized Book of Mormon. There are numerous notable adherents of the church, and LDS missionary efforts in the region were highlighted in the film The Other Side of Heaven. The church began operating schools in the Pacific Islands in 1850, and currently owns and runs Brigham Young University–Hawaii (BYU–Hawaii) and the nearby Polynesian Cultural Center. The Book of Mormon has been translated into numerous local languages of the region since 1855.

== History ==
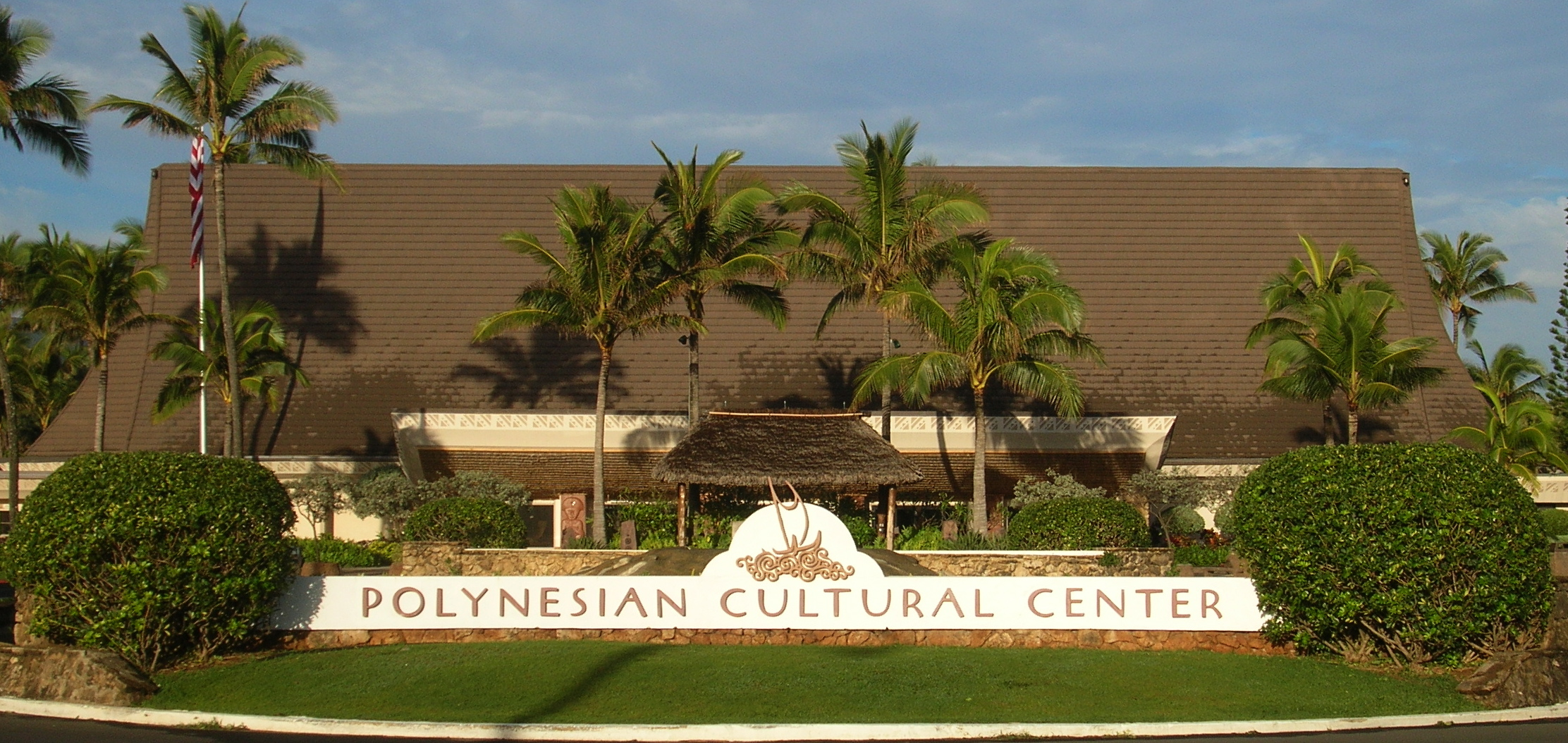
Entrance to the Polynesian Cultural Center

The Pacific islands were one of the first areas to be evangelized by LDS Church missionaries after Europe and North America, notably Hawaii, which was annexed by the United States in 1898. The LDS Church began sending missionaries to the region in 1844, and 75 years later the Laie Hawaii Temple became the first LDS temple outside the continental United States in 1919. In 1955, the church partially lifted some of its temple and priesthood racial restrictions and began allowing Melanesian women and men access to all temple ceremonies (called ordinances), and Melanesian men and boys to be ordained to the priesthood. The church allowed Pacific Islanders to hold the priesthood, and president of the church David O. McKay stated that native Fijians and Australian Aboriginals could also be ordained to the priesthood. Later that year the Church College of Hawaii was established, which would later become BYU–Hawaii.

== Hagoth ==
In addition to the LDS Church's stories about people sailing to the New World, there is also the story of Hagoth (/ˈheɪ.ɡɑːθ/ (Note: IPA-ified from "hā´gäth")), a Nephite ship builder who according to The Book of Mormon lived in or around 55 BCE, and whom some church publications have stated sailed from the Americas to Polynesia. (Note: More examples of articles stating the Hagoth link between the peoples of the Pacific Islands and the purported peoples of The Book of Mormon are here: Press release: Student manuals: Magazines:) Leaders of the LDS Church and LDS scholars have stated that the peoples of the Pacific Islands, including Hawaii, Polynesia, and New Zealand, are descendants of the Nephite Hagoth and his supposed followers, and this accounts for their darker skin. Many members of the LDS Church in Polynesia have come to believe that Hagoth is their ancestor. Modern genetic testing has not established any connection between Pacific Islanders and purported peoples of The Book of Mormon.

== Folklore ==
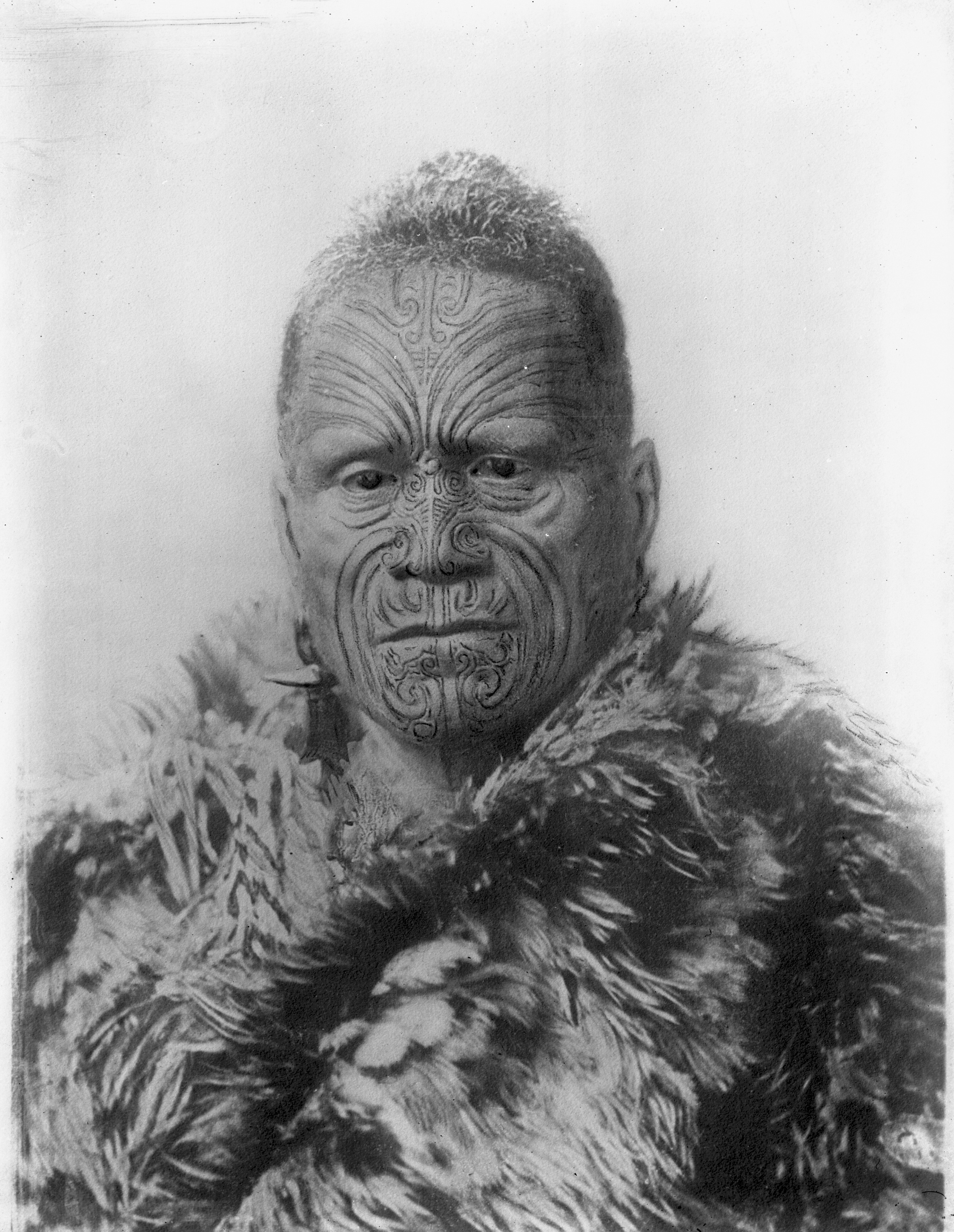
Tāwhiao

Some of the folklore that exists in the relationship of the LDS Church and Pacific Islanders include:

- Polynesian leader Tāwhiao accurately predicted the site of the 1958 Hamilton New Zealand Temple before his death in 1894;
- Māori prophets or chieftains, including Paora Te Potangaroa and Tāwhiao, predicted the coming of Latter-day Saint missionaries to New Zealand;
- During the attack on Pearl Harbor on December 7, 1941, Japanese aircraft pilots attempted to bomb or strafe the church's Laie Hawaii Temple, but were prevented due to a mechanical failures or unseen protective force. An LDS-source stated that the Japanese pilot who attempted to bomb or strafe the Laie Hawaii Temple was converted to the LDS Church after he saw a picture of the temple in the possession of Latter-day Saint missionaries in Japan.

== Temples ==
The Oceania region has a number of church temples due to the numbers of members in many countries there. There are also temples in the Philippines and Australia.

Map	Country	Image	Temple		Location	Status / Dedication date	Floor area
Operating / Construction / Announced / Closed							
Operating / Construction / Announced / Closed	Fiji		Suva Fiji Temple	edit	Suva, Fiji	June 18, 2000	12,755 sq ft 1,185.0 m^{2}
Operating / Construction / Announced / Closed	French Polynesia		Papeete Tahiti Temple	edit	Papeete, Tahiti, French Polynesia	October 27, 1983	12,150 sq ft 1,129 m^{2}
Operating / Construction / Announced / Closed	Hawaii		Kona Hawaii Temple	edit	Kailua-Kona, Hawaii, United States	Closed for renovation	12,325 sq ft 1,145.0 m^{2}
Operating / Construction / Announced / Closed	Hawaii		Laie Hawaii Temple	edit	Laie, Hawaii, United States	November 27, 1919	42,100 sq ft 3,910 m^{2}
Operating / Construction / Announced / Closed	New Zealand		Hamilton New Zealand Temple	edit	Hamilton, New Zealand	April 20, 1958	45,251 sq ft 4,204.0 m^{2}
Operating / Construction / Announced / Closed	Samoa		Apia Samoa Temple	edit	Apia, Samoa	August 5, 1983	18,691 sq ft 1,736.5 m^{2}
Operating / Construction / Announced / Closed	Samoa		Apia Samoa Temple (original)	edit	Apia, Samoa	Destroyed	14,560 sq ft 1,353 m^{2}
Operating / Construction / Announced / Closed	Tonga		Nuku'alofa Tonga Temple	edit	Nukuʻalofa, Tonga	August 9, 1983	21,184 sq ft 1,968.1 m^{2}

== Demographics ==
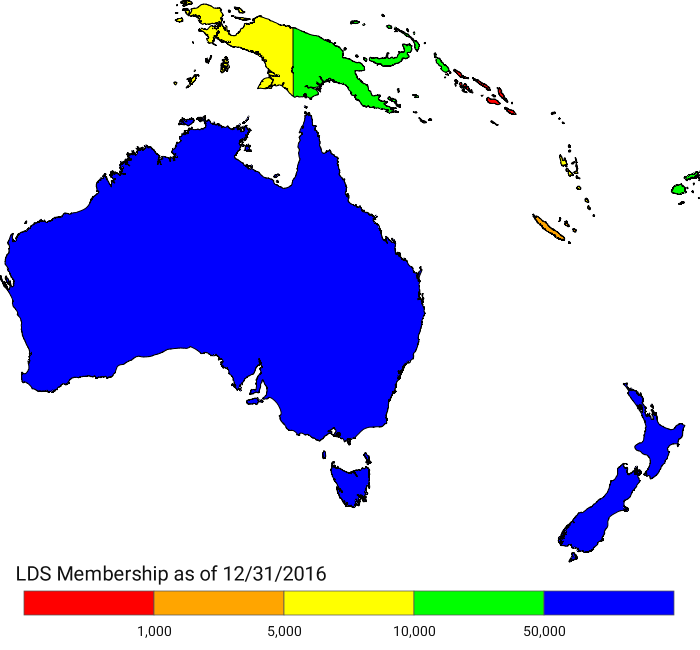

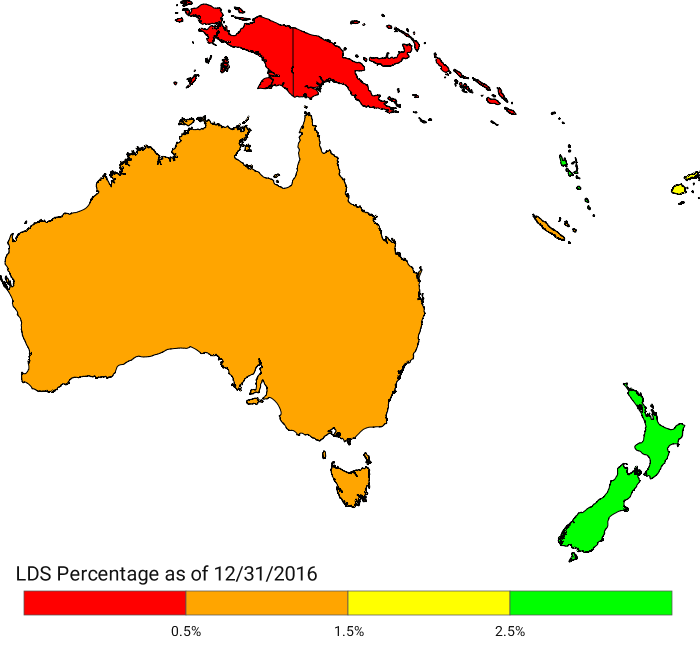

== Book of Mormon translations ==
The branches of the Oceanic languages. Orange is the Admiralties languages and Yapese, yellow-orange is St. Matthias, green is Western Oceanic, violet is Temotu, and the rest are Central-Eastern: dark red Southeast Solomons, blue Southern Oceanic, pink Micronesian, and ocher Fijian-Polynesian.

- 1855: Hawaiian language translation of the Book of Mormon, which was the first translation of the Book of Mormon to be published in a non-European language.
- 1889: Māori edition.
- 1903: Samoan edition.
- 1904: Tahitian edition.
- 1946: Tongan edition.
- 1965: Rarotongan edition.
- 1980: Fijian edition.
- 1981: Niuean edition (selections)
- 1987: Pohnpeian, Micronesian languages (selections).
- 1988: Palauan edition.
- 1989: Chamorro edition.
- 2001: Gilbertese (Kiribati) edition.
- 2002: Tok Pisin edition.
- 2003: Marshallese edition.
- 2004: Bislama edition.
- 2004: Yapese edition.
- 2015: Kosraean edition, Micronesian languages.
- 2015: Chuukese/Trukese edition, Micronesian languages.

== Portrayals in media ==
- Johnny Lingo
- The Other Side of Heaven
- The Legend of Johnny Lingo, a remake of the 1968 film.

== Notable Pacific Islander Latter-day Saints ==
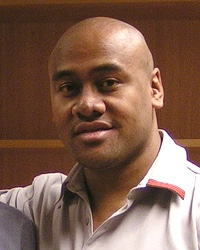
Jonah Lomu

LDS Church members from indigenous groups:

=== Political figures ===
- Prince Ata of Tonga
- Robert Hoapili Baker, Governor of Maui and aide-de-camp to King Kalākaua
- Princess ʻElisiva Fusipala Vahaʻi of Tonga
- Elizabeth Kikkert, former member of the Australian Capital Territory Legislative Assembly
- William Sio, former New Zealand MP
- William Swain, Marshall Islands representative to the United Nations
- Tāwhiao, second Māori kīngi

=== Artists ===
- Dinah Jane, singer, member of Fifth Harmony
- The Jets, musical group

=== Athletes ===
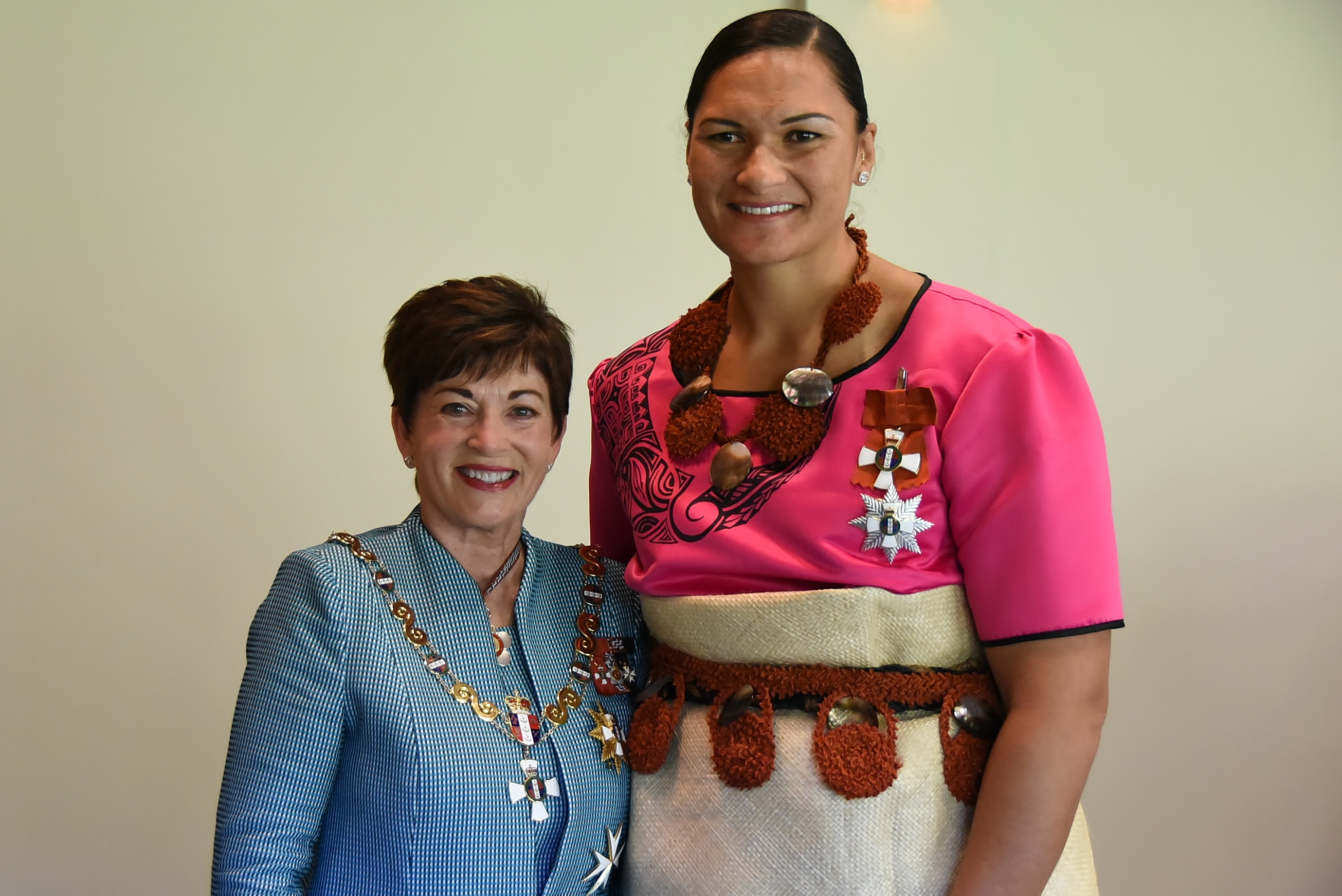
Valerie Adams (right) in 2017, after her investiture as a Dame Companion of the New Zealand Order of Merit by the governor-general, Dame Patsy Reddy

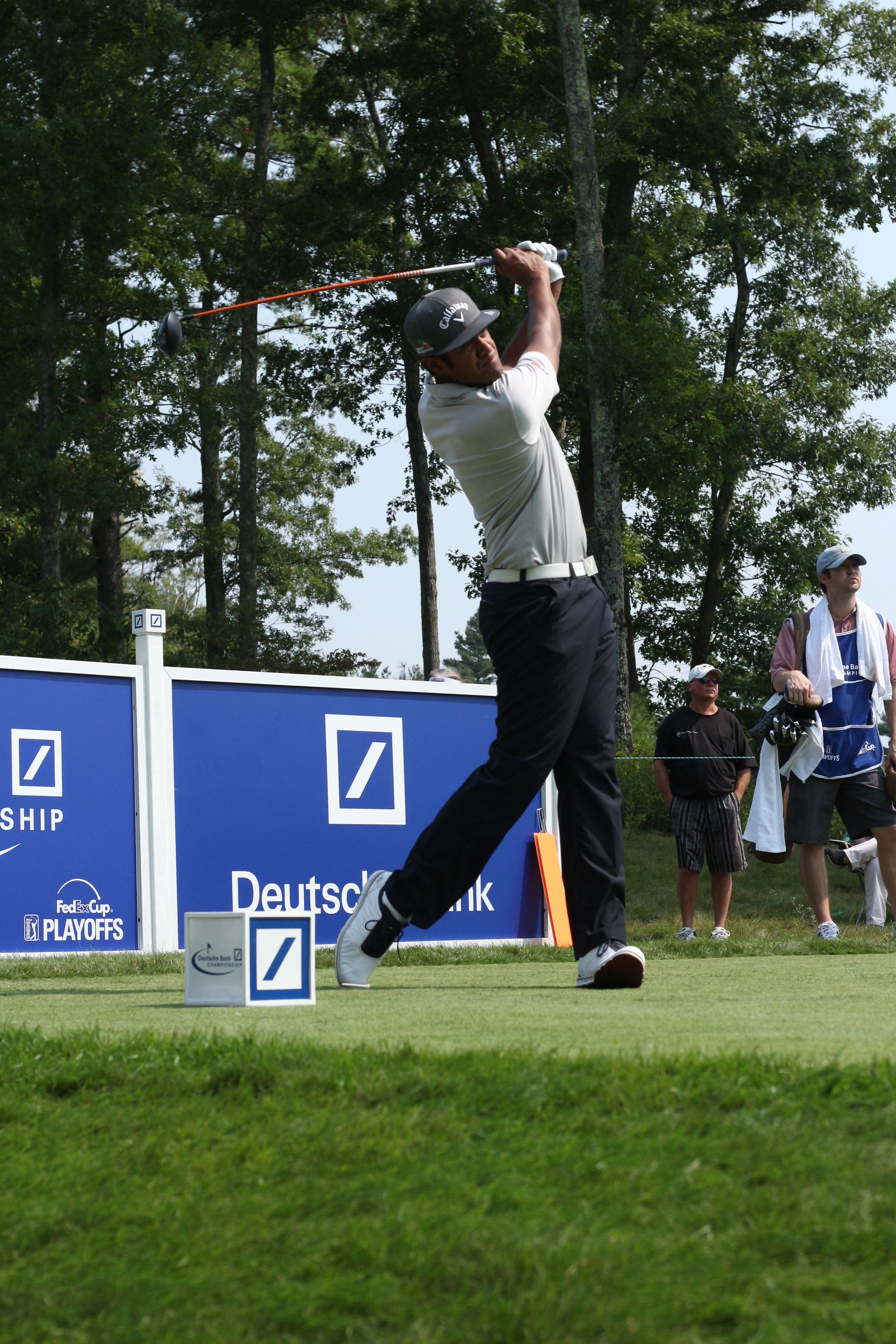
Tony Finau

- Valerie Adams, shot putter
- Willie Brown, rugby league footballer
- Kaingaue David, sprinter
- Tony Finau, professional golfer
- Mosese Foliaki, multi-sport athlete
- Ken Going, rugby union footballer
- Pearl Going, mountaineer
- Sid Going, rugby union footballer
- John Hopoate, rugby league footballer and boxer
- William Hopoate, rugby league footballer
- Jonah Lomu, rugby union footballer
- Ken Niumatalolo, college football coach
- Brendon Pongia, basketball player
- Lloyd Perrett, rugby league footballer
- Sam Perrett, rugby league footballer
- Jordan Rapana, rugby league footballer
- Leilani Rorani, squash player
- Vai Sikahema, American football player
- Kalani Sitake, American football coach
- Nooa Takooa, sprinter
- Saimoni Tamani, track and field athlete
- Manti Te'o, American football player

== See also ==
- List of Mormon missionary diarists (Pacific)
- LDS membership statistics
- Native American people and Mormonism
- Black people and Mormonism
