= The Church of Jesus Christ of Latter-day Saints in Wales =

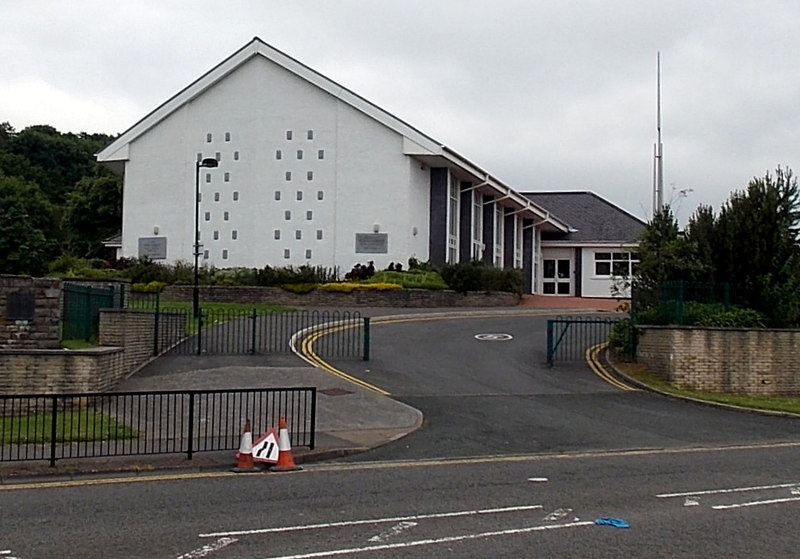
- LDS chapel in Merthyr Tydfil
- Area: Europe North
- Stakes: 3
- Wards: 15
- Branches: 3
- Total congregations: 18
- FamilySearch Centers: 12

The Church of Jesus Christ of Latter-day Saints in Wales refers to the Church of Jesus Christ of Latter-day Saints (LDS Church) and its members in Wales.

== History ==
=== First missionaries in Wales ===
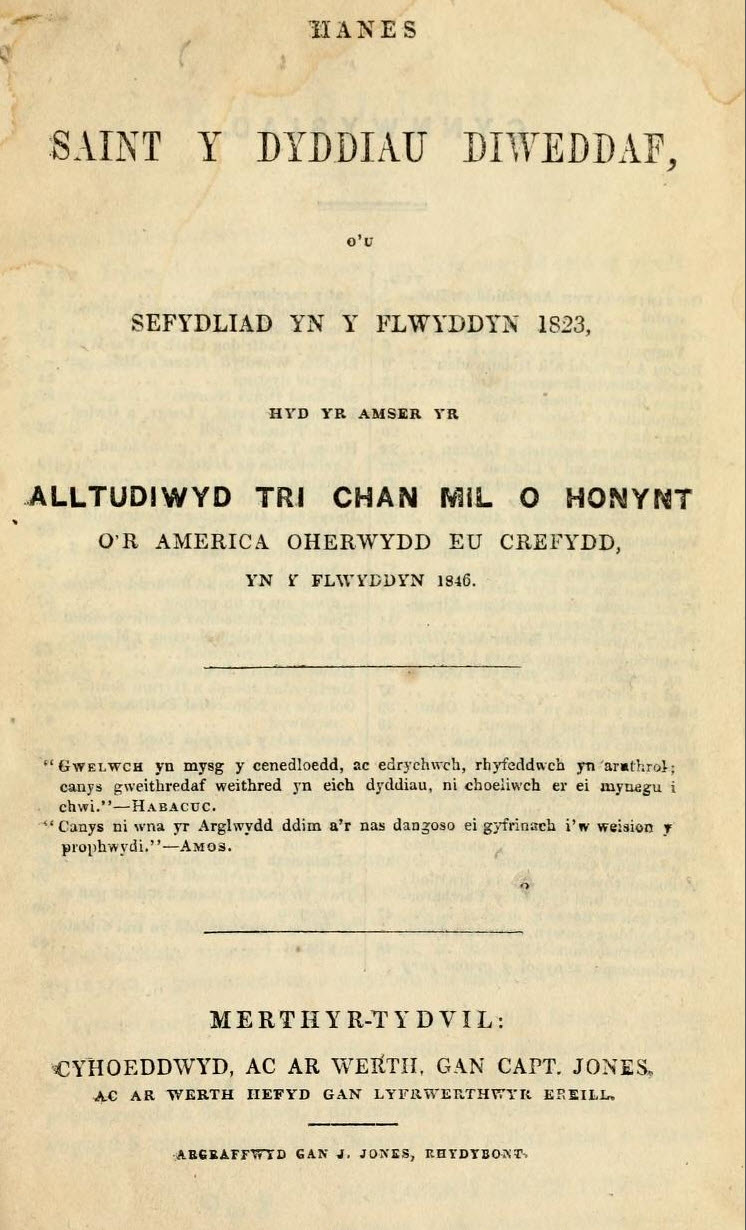
First issue of the Prophwyd y Jubili by Dan Jones. Carmarthenshire, Wales. July, 1846.

==== Church beginnings ====
The first missionaries from the original Church of Christ, founded by Joseph Smith, to arrive in Wales were Henry Royle and Frederick Cook. Royle was called as a missionary in 1840; He was a convert to the church and a native of Britain. Brigham Young and Heber C. Kimball had briefly preached in Wales during their mission together. The two missionaries arrived on October 16 and began teaching in Overton. They were met with immediate success and had baptisms in the River Dee only two days after their arrival. By the end of the month, they established a branch of 32 members. The two elders were joined by James Burnham in November of that year.

In January 1849, a small Latter Day Saint chapel was built in Llanelli becoming the first by the church not just in Wales but in the whole of the British Isles.

==== Dan Jones ====
In 1845 Dan Jones was called as a missionary to Wales. He would become one of the most successful Latter Day Saints missionaries to work in the United Kingdom. Arriving January 1845, Jones was assigned to work in Wrexham. By December there were 493 baptised members of the Church of Jesus Christ of Latter-day Saints in Wales. The next year in January, he was made mission president and oversaw missionary work in the country by Wilford Woodruff because Jones knew how to speak, read, and write in Welsh. By the time he left Wales in February 1849 there were 4,645 baptised members and seventy-two branches. In terms of population, one out of every 278 people in Wales at that time was baptised into the LDS Church. When Jones returned from his first mission, he helped a group of Welsh Saints to emigrate to the Salt Lake Valley.

Jones was asked to return to Wales in August 1852. He became a counselor to the mission president and was called to be the president in 1854. He also worked as the editor of Udgorn Seion. During his second mission, opposition to the church had increased, but over 2,000 new members were added to the church by his departure 1856. On his passage home, he again assisted a group of Welsh emigrants to Utah.

=== Translating church publications ===
In 1846, Jones had begun to publish a Welsh language periodical for the church entitled Prophwyd y Jubili (Prophet of the Jubilee). It was the first Mormon periodical to be published in a language other than English. He had initiated publishing pamphlets and other magazines in the Welsh language that ultimately led to the publication of a Welsh translation of the Book of Mormon in April 1852 by John S. Davis.

In 1850 Davis, who had been appointed to oversee church publications in Wales, announced that he would translate the Doctrine and Covenants into Welsh. Davis would publish a 16-page signature in every other issue of Ugdorn Seion (Zion's Trumpet), which was the church publication following Prophet of the Jubilee. By August 1851, the 20 signatures were finished printing and were bound as the Welsh Doctrine and Covenants. Davies began translating and publishing the Book of Mormon into Welsh in the same manner. Church members paid a penny per signature that was printed. The initial printing of the book was delayed due to a lack of subscribers; however, the book eventually received enough funding and was printed, the final signature printing on April 17, 1852. These translations of these two books are still used by the church today.

The Pearl of Great Price, now part of the Standard Works of the LDS Church, was first compiled in England in 1851 by Franklin D. Richards. Within a year it had been translated into Welsh.

=== Opposition and decline in membership ===
Although early missionary efforts had been successful, there was a decline in church membership in the late 1850s. This decline was due, in part, by church members emigrating to the United States after their conversion and a decrease in the number of new converts. Other factors that could have contributed to this decline include the introduction of polygamy into church practice in 1853 and social and political reforms in Wales. Opposition to Latter-day Saint missionary efforts in United Kingdom existed from the earliest missions but intensified in South Wales and the West Midlands in the 1850s, leading to some violent incidents.

Another factor that led to decline in membership was the organisation of the Reorganized Church of Jesus Christ of Latter Day Saints (now known as Community of Christ) on April 6, 1860. This group was led by Joseph Smith's son Joseph Smith III and consisted of previously scattered branches of the church in the Midwestern United States who had rejected Brigham Young and the Council of Twelve Apostles' leadership and not gone West with the majority of the Latter Days Saints (see succession crisis). RLDS missionaries began preaching in Wales in 1863 with many LDS members choosing to join with the Reorganization. Because of the decrease in membership, the last issue of Ugdorn Seion was published in April 1962. This gradual decline continued until the mid-20th century.

== Welsh members and the Mormon Tabernacle Choir ==
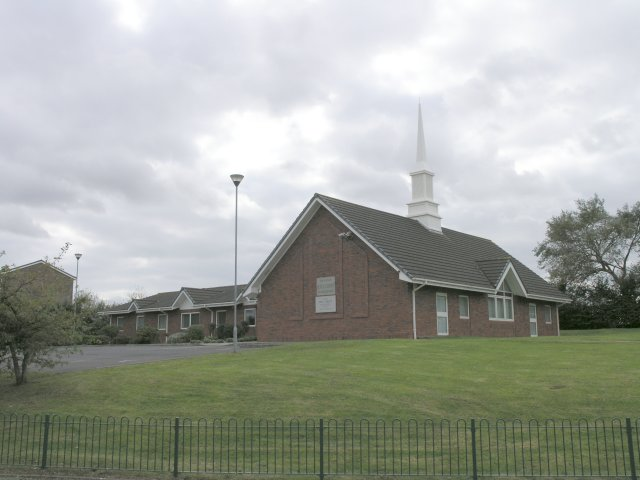
LDS chapel in Llanelli

Dan Jones and faithful Welsh members greatly influenced the formation of the Mormon Tabernacle Choir. Jones helped bring a group of 250 Welsh converts to the United States. Among these faithful church members were many singers who would help form the church's choir. John Parry, one of the members in this group, directed 85 Welsh converts in a special musical number at the October 1849 General Conference. Parry was asked by Brigham Young to form and direct a choir, which later became known as the Mormon Tabernacle Choir.

== Stakes and congregations ==
Meetinghouses in Wales
Green = Stake center and meetinghouse
Purple = Meetinghouse

3 Stakes have congregations in Wales. 2 Stakes are entirely within Wales. The Chester England Stake Centre and 4 of its 6 congregations meet in Wales.

Cardiff Wales Stake

- Blackwood Ward
- Bridgend Ward
- Caerphilly Ward
- Cardiff Ward
- Cwmbran Ward
- Newport-Gwent Ward
- Pontypridd Ward

Merthyr Tydfil Wales Stake

- Aberystwyth Branch
- Llanelli Ward
- Merthyr Tydfil 1st Ward
- Merthyr Tydfil 2nd Ward
- Milford Haven Branch
- Newcastle Emlyn Ward
- Swansea Ward

Chester England Stake (only congregations meeting in Wales shown)

- Chester Ward
- Gaerwen Ward
- Porthmadog Branch
- Rhyl Ward

== Missions ==
The nation of Wales does not have its own mission. Instead it is served by two English missions:

- England Bristol Mission (Cardiff and Merthyr Tydfil Wales Stakes)
- England Manchester Mission (Chester England Stake)

== Temples ==
There are no temples in Wales itself. Instead, members of the church in Wales use either of the two temples in England. Members of the church in north Wales as assigned to the Preston temple district, whereas the London temple (actually in Sussex) district includes the two Stakes in south Wales.

12. London England Temple; Official website; News & images	
Location: Announced: Groundbreaking: Dedicated: Rededicated: Size: Style:	Newchapel, Surrey, England; 17 February 1955 by David O. McKay; 27 August 1955 by David O. McKay; 7 September 1958 by David O. McKay; 18 October 1992 by Gordon B. Hinckley; 42,652 sq ft (3,962.5 m^{2}) on a 32-acre (13 ha) site Modern contemporary, single spire - designed by Edward O. Anderson
52. Preston England Temple; Official website; News & images	
Location: Announced: Groundbreaking: Dedicated: Size: Style:	Chorley, Lancashire, England; 19 October 1992 by Ezra Taft Benson; 12 June 1994 by Gordon B. Hinckley; 7 June 1998 by Gordon B. Hinckley; 69,630 sq ft (6,469 m^{2}) on a 32-acre (13 ha) site Modern, single-spire design - designed by Church A&E Services
257. Birmingham England Temple (Under construction); Official website; News & images	
Location: Announced: Groundbreaking: Size:	Sutton Coldfield, Birmingham, England; 3 April 2022 by Russell M. Nelson; 22 March 2025 by Scott D. Whiting; 10,800 sq ft (1,000 m^{2}) on a 2.7-acre (1.1 ha) site

== Notable Welsh Latter-day Saints ==
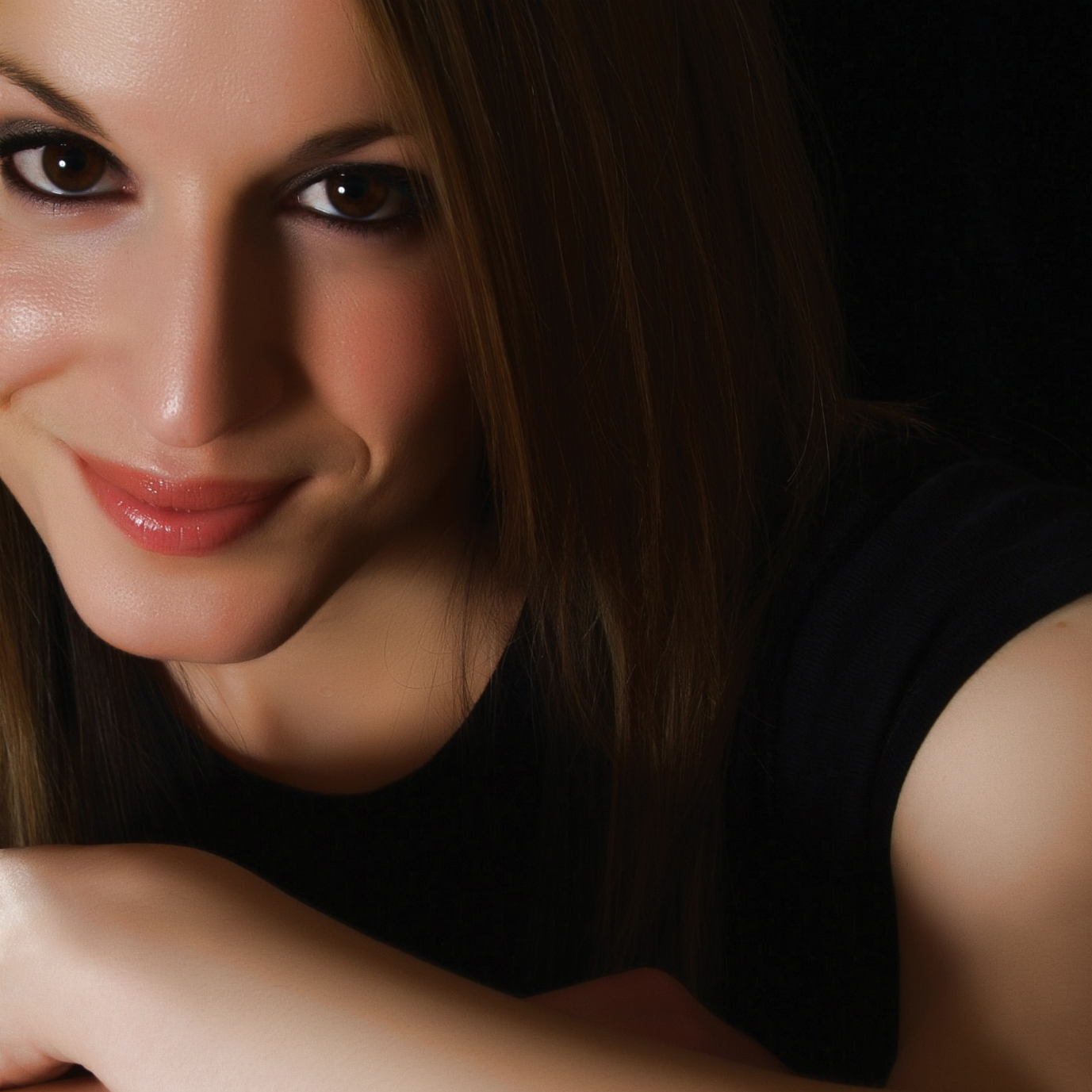
Jessica Garlick, a Welsh Latter-day Saint

Welsh LDS include:

- Martha Hughes Cannon
- William W. Davies
- Thomas Duncombe Dee
- John Henry Evans
- Jessica Garlick
- George F. Gibbs
- Rosalind Hall
- William Howells (Mormon)
- Orson Pratt Huish
- David John (Mormon)
- Dan Jones (Mormon)
- Noel L. Owen
- John Parry (Mormon)
- Evan Stephens
- Alex Winters
- John Silvanus Davis

== See also ==
- Religion in Wales
