= List of Book of Mormon translations =

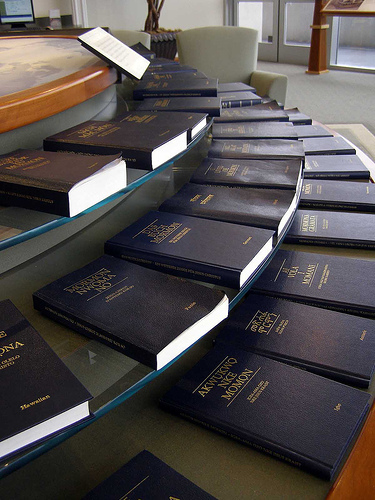
Display of the Book of Mormon translated into different languages

As of 2021, the Book of Mormon has been translated into over 115 languages, mostly but not exclusively by the Church of Jesus Christ of Latter-day Saints, and there are active projects to translate it into a number of other languages. Portions of the book, as opposed to complete translations, have also been conducted for another 20 languages. These tables show all the versions of the Book of Mormon that have been translated. Unless otherwise indicated, the translation was financed and the resulting text published by the Church of Jesus Christ of Latter-day Saints, which is by far the largest church in the Latter Day Saint movement. Not all translations are currently in print. As of 2021, the Church of Jesus Christ of Latter-day Saints continues to publish at least portions of the Book of Mormon in 115 languages. The Community of Christ, the second largest church in the Latter Day Saint movement, has also published its own translations of the work in various languages, though becoming increasingly less common to find. The Church of Jesus Christ (Bickertonite) has published their own respective editions of the Book of Mormon in Italian, Spanish, and various small languages meant only for Locals, and published in the Respective Nations. The Church of Christ (Temple Lot) publishes the Book of Mormon in Spanish.

The following list provides details on officially translated versions of the Book of Mormon published by the Church of Jesus Christ of Latter-day Saints, as well as translations in languages not published by the Church of Jesus Christ of Latter-day Saints.

== Complete translations ==
No.	Date	Language	Title	Primary locations of language	Notes	Image	Approx. no. of speakers
1	1830	English	The Book of Mormon	Anglosphere, minorities elsewhere	Translated by Joseph Smith. Most recent edition 2013. There are a number of English editions by multiple publishers.		400,000,000 as a foreign language: 600–700,000,000
2	1851	Danish	Mormons Bog	the Danish Realm (incl. Faroe Islands and Greenland) as well as bordering areas and large parts of Iceland	most recent edition 2019; originally translated by Peter O. Hansen		5,500,000
3	1852	French	Le Livre de Mormon	Benin, Democratic Republic of the Congo, Republic of the Congo, France, Gabon, Guinea, Ivory Coast, Monaco, Senegal, Togo, and as a co-official language elsewhere	Most recent edition 2017. First in a Romance language; original translation credited to John Taylor and Curtis E. Bolton (assisted by Louis A. Bertrand and others)		76,800,000 (as a foreign language: 274,000,000)
4	1852	Welsh	Llyfr Mormon	Wales, minority in Argentina	Most recent edition 2000. The only translation in a Celtic language; originally translated by John S. Davis.		700,000+
5	1852	German	Das Buch Mormon	Germany, Austria, Switzerland with minorities elsewhere in Europe	most recent edition 2019		90,000,000
6	1852	Italian	Il Libro di Mormon	Italy, Switzerland, San Marino, minorities elsewhere	most recent edition 1995		69,000,000
7	1855	Hawaiian	Ka Buke a Moramona	Hawaiian Islands (minority in Continental United States)	first non-European language translation; translated by Jonatana Napela and George Q. Cannon		24,000
—	1869	Deseret Alphabet (English)	𐐜 𐐒𐐳𐐿 𐐱𐑂 𐐣𐐫𐑉𐑋𐐲𐑌	Utah Territory (defunct)	No longer officially printed by any Church affiliation, Deseret enthusiasts and historians have revitalized Deseret editions of the Book of Mormon which can be purchased in print or read online. Originally published in "part one" which covered a third of the Book of Mormon and a "family edition" which included the complete text.		unknown
8	1878	Swedish	Mormons Bok	Sweden, Finland	Most recent translation published 2008		10,000,000
9	1886	Spanish	El Libro de Mormón	Spain, Latin America, Equatorial Guinea, considerable minorities in United States, the Philippines, and Western Sahara	selections published in 1875 by Daniel Webster Jones and Meliton G. Trejo; Trejo completed the full translation with James Z. Stewart, this was then revised Eduardo Balderas and Antoine R. Ivins; most recent edition 1992.		480,000,000
10	1889	Māori	Ko Te Pukapuka a Moromona	New Zealand, expatriate minority in Australia			149,000
11	1890	Dutch	Het Boek van Mormon	Netherlands, Flanders, French Flanders, Suriname			22,000,000
12	1903	Samoan	O le Tusi a Mamona	Samoa, American Samoa (minority in NZ)	Retranslated in 2011.		510,000
13	1904	Tahitian	Te Buka a Moromona	Tahiti		cover of the Tahitian Book of Mormon	185,000
14	1906	Turkish	Mormon Kitabı'ndan Seçmeler (1906 ed.), Mormon Kitabı (2001 ed.)	1906 Armenian script version (now largely defunct); formerly used in present-day Eastern Turkey, Syria, Lebanon, and the U.S. 2001 Roman script edition used in Turkey	Armenian script version was first Asian language translation, now out of print; selections in Roman script published in 1983; full text in Roman script published in 2001	cover of the Book of Mormon in Turkish	75,700,000
15	1909	Japanese	モルモン書 (Morumon-sho)	Japan, minorities elsewhere	most recent edition 2009. First in an east Asian language; originally translated by Alma O. Taylor. Originally entitled モルモン経 until c. 1992.		125,000,000
16	1933	Czech	Kniha Mormonova	Czech Republic, former Czechoslovakia	First in a Slavic language.		10,700,000 (15,200,000 when taken with Slovak)
—	1936	Braille (English)	⠮ (braille pattern dots-2346) (braille pattern (whitespace)) (braille pattern (whitespace)) ⠃ (braille pattern dots-12) ⠕ (braille pattern dots-135) ⠅ (braille pattern dots-13) ⠷ (braille pattern dots-12356) ⠍ (braille pattern dots-134) ⠗ (braille pattern dots-1235) ⠝ (braille pattern dots-1345)		most recent edition 1994	printed title page of the Braille Book of Mormon	
17	1937	Armenian, Western	Մօրմոնի Գիրքէն	Middle East, U.S., and elsewhere	1937 complete edition currently out of print; new translation (selections only) published in 1983	Cover of the Book of Mormon in Western Armenian	1,400,000
18	1939	Portuguese	O Livro de Mórmon	Brazil, Portugal (also used in Mozambique, Angola, Cape Verde)	most recent edition 1995		223,000,000
19	1946	Tongan	Ko e Tohi ʻa Molomoná	Tonga (minority in NZ)		Cover of the Book of Mormon in Tongan	169,000
20	1950	Norwegian	Mormons Bok	Norway			5,200,000
21	1954	Finnish	Mormonin Kirja	Finland, Sweden, minority in Russia (Karelia)	First in a Finno-Ugric language.		5,400,000
22	1965	Chinese	摩爾門經	Taiwan, Hong Kong, Southeast Asia	Retranslated in 2007 and changed name from 摩門經 to 摩爾門經.		1.2 billion (The spoken varieties of Chinese other than Mandarin are not closely related and are sometimes treated as separate languages.)
23	1965	Rarotongan (Cook Islands Māori)	Te Puka a Momoni	Cook Islands		Cover of the Book of Mormon in Rarotongan	15,000
24	1967	Korean	몰몬경	Korea (Minorities in PRC, Russia and elsewhere)	Translated by Han In Sang.	Cover of the Book of Mormon in Korean	77,000,000
25	1972	Afrikaans	Die Boek van Mormon	South Africa, Namibia, Zimbabwe	First African language edition	Cover of the Book of Mormon in Afrikaans	10,000,000
26	1976	Thai	พระคัมภีร์ มอรมอน	Thailand	New translation completed in 2010		44,000,000
27	1977	Indonesian	Kitab Mormon	Indonesia	New translation completed in 2010	Cover of the Book of Mormon in Indonesian	156,000,000
28	1979	Croatian	Mormonova Knjiga	Croatia		Cover of the Book of Mormon in Indonesian	5,600,000 (formerly lumped together with other languages as Serbo-Croat)
29	1980	Fijian	Ai Vola i Momani	Fiji		Cover of the Book of Mormon in Fijian	450,000
30	1981	Catalan	El Llibre del Mormó	Catalonia, Andorra, Roussillon		Cover of the Book of Mormon in Catalan	4,000,000
31	1981	Icelandic	Mormónsbók	Iceland			358,000
32	1981	Polish	Księga Mormona	Poland, minorities elsewhere			50,000,000
33	1981	Russian	Книга Мормона	Russia, post-Soviet states, Eastern Europe	New translation completed in 2011 Although some missionary work had been done prior to the Russian Revolution, missionaries were only allowed back into Russia in the 1990s.		260,000,000
34	1982	Hindi	मॉर्मन धर्मशास्त्र	India		Cover of the Book of Mormon in Hindi	322,000,000
35	1982	Vietnamese	Sách Mặc Môn	Vietnam		Cover of the Book of Mormon in Vietnamese	96,000,000
36	1983	Q'eqchi' (Kekchi)	Lix Hu Laj Mormon	Belize, Guatemala	First in a language native to the Americas.	Cover of the Book of Mormon in Q'eqchi'	800,000
37	1986	Arabic	كتاب مورمون	North Africa, Middle East, with substantial minorities elsewhere. Highly pluricentric language with divergent dialects.		Cover of the Book of Mormon in Arabic	310,000,000
38	1986	Aymara	Mormonan Kellkatapa	Peru, Bolivia		Cover of the Book of Mormon in Aymara	1,677,100
39	1987	Greek	Το Βιβλίο του Μόρμον	Greece, Cyprus, minorities elsewhere		Cover of the Book of Mormon in Greek	13,400,000
40	1991	Hungarian	Mormon könyve	Hungary, Romania, northern Serbia, indigenous minorities elsewhere in Europe	Selections published in 1979		13,000,000
—	1995	Braille (Spanish)					
41	1995	Ilokano	Ti Libro ni Mormon	Philippines		Cover of the Book of Mormon in Ilokano	10,000,000
42	1997	Ukrainian	Книга Мормона	Ukraine, also minorities elsewhere in former USSR			35,000,000
43	1998	Cebuano	Ang Basahon ni Mormon	Philippines	Selections published in 1992	Cover of the Book of Mormon in Cebuano	42,100,000
44	1998	Pangasinan	Say Libro nen Mormon	Philippines (Pangasinan)		Cover of the Book of Mormon in Pangasinan	1,200,000
45	1998	Romanian	Cartea lui Mormon	Romania, Moldova		Cover of the Book of Mormon in Romanian	26,000,000
46	1998	Tagalog	Ang Aklat ni Mormon	Philippines			60,000,000
47	1999	Bulgarian	Книгата на Мормон	Bulgaria; minorities in Greece, Turkey and Ukraine	selections published in 1980	Cover of the Book of Mormon in Bulgarian	9,000,000
48	1999	Albanian	Libri i Mormonit	Albania, Kosovo, minorities in Greece and Italy.		Cover of the Book of Mormon in Albanian	5,400,000
49	1999	Fante	Mormon Nwoma No	Ghana		Cover of the Book of Mormon in Fante	1,900,000
50	1999	Haitian Creole	Liv Mòmon An	Haiti	selections published in 1983	Cover of a triple combination in Haitian Creole	9,600,000
51	1999	Shona	Bhuku Ramormoni	Zimbabwe, Zambia, Botswana	Selections published in 1988	Cover of the Book of Mormon in Shona	15,000,000
52	2000	Estonian	Mormoni Raamat	Estonia	New translation published in 2011		1,100,000
53	2000	Hmong	Phau Ntawv Maumoos	Southeast Asia (China, Vietnam, Laos, Myanmar and Thailand)	selections published in 1983	Cover of the Book of Mormon in Hmong	3,700,000
54	2000	Malagasy	Ny Bokin'i Môrmôna	Madagascar	selections published in 1983	Cover of the Book of Mormon in Malagasy	25,000,000
55	2000	Swahili	Kitabu cha Mormoni	East sub-Saharan Africa		Cover of the Book of Mormon in Swahili	90,000,000
56	2000	Amharic	መፅሐፈ ሞርሞን	North Central Ethiopia by the Amhara, Eritrea		Cover of the Book of Mormon in Amharic	21,811,600
57	2000	Latvian	Mormona Grāmata	Latvia		Cover of the Book of Mormon in Latvian	2,000,000
58	2000	Lithuanian	Mormono Knyga	Lithuania		Cover of the Book of Mormon in Lithuanian	3,100,000
59	2000	Ibo (Igbo)	Akwụkwọ nke Momọn	Nigeria			50,000,000
60	2000	Xhosa	Incwadi Kamormoni	South Africa		Cover of the Book of Mormon in Xhosa	19,200,000
61	2000	Telugu	మోర్మాన్ యొక్క గ్రంధము	India	Selections published in 1982	Cover of the Book of Mormon in Telugu	81,000,000
62	2000	Armenian, Eastern	Մորմոնի Գիրքը	Eastern Armenian is spoken in the Caucasus Mountains (particularly in Armenia and formerly Nagorno-Karabakh, as well as Georgia) and by the Armenian community in Iran. Due to migrations of speakers from Armenia and Iran to the Armenian Diaspora, the dialect is now very prominent in countries and regions where only Western Armenian was used. It was developed in the early 19th century and is based on the dialect of the Ararat district (of Eastern Armenia).	Most recent edition published in 2006	Cover of the Book of Mormon in Eastern Armenian	4,300,000
63	2000	American Sign Language		United States, Canada	on DVD; selections produced on VHS in 1995	Cover of the Book of Mormon in American Sign Language (DVD)	500,000
64	2001	Khmer (Cambodian)	ព្រះគម្ពីរមរមន	Cambodia, Vietnam, Thailand	Selections published in 1982	Cover of the Book of Mormon in Khmer	16,000,000
—	2001	Chinese (Simplified characters)	摩尔门经	China, Southeast Asia, minorities elsewhere	Selections published in 1982	Cover of the Book of Mormon in Simplified Chinese	
65	2001	Mongolian	Мормоны Ном	Mongolia, minority in China and Siberia	most recent edition 2008	Cover of the Book of Mormon in Mongolian	5,200,000
66	2001	Kiribati (Gilbertese)	Ana Boki Moomon	Kiribati	Selections published in 1988	Cover of the Book of Mormon in Kiribati	120,000
67	2002	Slovene	Mormonova Knjiga	Slovenia, Italy			2,500,000
68	2002	Neomelanesian (Tok Pisin)	Buk Momon	Papua New Guinea		Cover of the Book of Mormon in Tok Pisin	4,000,000
69	2003	Tswana	Buka ya ga Momone	Botswana			5,000,000
70	2003	Zulu	Incwadi Kamormoni	South Africa, Zimbabwe	selections published in 1987	Cover of the Book of Mormon in Zulu	12,000,000
71	2003	Marshallese	Bok in Mormon	Marshall Islands	Selections published in 1984; originally translated by William Swain.	Cover of the Book of Mormon in Marshallese	55,000
72	2004	Bislama	Buk Blong Momon	Vanuatu	Selections published in 1985	Cover of the Book of Mormon in Bislama	200,000
73	2004	Lingala	Buku ya Molomoni	Democratic Republic of the Congo, Republic of the Congo	selections published in 1998	Cover of the Book of Mormon in Lingala	70,000,000
74	2004	Yapese	Fare Babyor ku Mormon	Yap, Federated States of Micronesia		Cover of the Book of Mormon in Yapese	5,130
75	2005	Twi	Mormon Woma no	Ghana			9,000,000
76	2005	Tamil	மார்மன் புத்தகம்	Southern India, Sri Lanka	Selections published in 1982	Cover of the Book of Mormon in Tamil	74,000,000
77	2005	Hiligaynon (Ilonggo)	Ang Libro ni Mormon	Philippines	selections published in 1994	Cover of the Book of Mormon in Hiligaynon	9,300,000
78	2007	Urdu	مورمن کی کتاب	Pakistan, India, minorities elsewhere	Selections published in 1988		67,000,000 (Formerly lumped together with other languages as Hindustani)
79	2007	Serbian	Мормонова Књига	Serbia			8,000,000 (Formerly lumped together with other languages as Serbo-Croat)
80	2007	Yoruba	Ìwé Ti Mọ́mọ́nì	Nigeria, Benin, Togo			48,000,000
81	2008	Sinhala	මෝමන්වරුන්ගේ පොත	Sri Lanka	Selections published in 1983		17,000,000
82	2009	Guaraní	Mormon Kuatiañe'ẽ	Paraguay, Argentina, Brazil	selections published in 1982	Cover of the Book of Mormon in Guarani	4,850,000
83	2011	Quichua–Ecuador	Mormónpaj Quilcashca	Ecuador	Selections published in 1980 as Mormon Killkashkamanta		1,209,000
84	2012	Lao	ພຣະຄຳພີ ມໍມອນ	Laos	selections published in 1982	Cover of the Book of Mormon in Lao	30,000,000
85	2013	Slovak	Kniha Mormonova	Slovakia			5,510,000 (Formerly associated with the Czech language)
86	2013	Malay	Kitab Mormon	Malaysia			77,000,000
87	2015	Kosraean	Puk Luhn Mormon	Federated States of Micronesia			9,000
88	2015	Chuukese	Ewe Puken Mormon	Federated States of Micronesia		Cover of the Book of Mormon in Chuukese	51,330
89	2015	Persian	كتاب مورمون	Iran, Afghanistan, Tajikistan		Cover of the Book of Mormon in Persian	110,000,000 (including Tajiki)
90	2017	Nepali	मोर्मोंनको पुस्तक	Nepal			25,000,000
91	2018	Georgian	მორმონის წიგნი	Georgia			3,700,000
92	2019	Burmese	မော်မုန်ကျမ်း	Myanmar			43,000,000
93	2021	Macedonian	Книгата на Мормон	North Macedonia; minorities in Albania, Greece and Serbia			Unknown
94	2023	Kinyarwanda	Igitabo cya Morumoni	Rwanda, Uganda, Democratic Republic of Congo, Tanzania			12,000,000
95	2023	Pohnpeian	Pwuken Mormon	Federated States of Micronesia	Selections published in 1987		29,000
96	2024	Tshilubà	Mukanda wa Molomo	Democratic Republic of the Congo	Also known as Luba-Kasai, Western Luba, Ciluba/Tshilubà		6,300,000
97	2024	Maltese	Il-Ktieb ta’ Mormon	Malta, minorities elsewhere			600,000
98	2024	Swati	Incwadzi Yamormon	eSwatini, South Africa			2,300,000
99	2023	Chewa	Buku la Mormoni	Malawi, Zambia, Mozambique			14,000,000

== Selections only ==
Number	Date	Language	Title	Primary Location of Language	Notes	Approx. no. of speakers
1	1978	Kaqchikel	Ri Vuj Richin Ri Mormon	Guatemala (Central Highlands)	Initially released on audio tape due to low levels of literacy within this language.	450,000
2	1979	Quechua—Peru	Mormonpa Qelqanmanta Aqllaska T'aqakuna	Peru		1,500,000
3	1979	Quiché	Ri Wuj Re Ri Mormon	Guatemala (Central Highlands)		2,330,000
4	1980	Navajo	Naaltsoos Mormon Wolyéhígíí	Southwestern United States	Full translation announced, 2017	169,000
5	1981	Guna	Mormón Kaiya Purba	Panama, Colombia		61,000
6	1981	Niuean	Tohi a Moromona	Niue, Cook Islands, New Zealand, and Tonga,		7,700
7	1981	Quechua—Bolivia	Mormompa Libronmanta	Bolivia		1,616,000
8	1983	Efik	Eto Ŋwed Mormon	Nigeria	Full translation announced, 2017	2,400,000
9	1983	Kisii (Gusii)	Ebuku Ya Mormoni	Kenya		2,200,000
10	1983	Mam	Aj U'j Te Mormon	Guatemala, Mexico		478,000
11	1983	Maya	U Libroil Mormon	Mexico, Belize, Guatemala		792,000
12	1985	Bengali	মর্মন বইয়ের	Bangladesh, India (Substantial diaspora including in UK)	Full translation underway	260,000,000
13	1987	Papiamento	E Buki di Mormon	Netherlands Antilles, Aruba		341,000
14	1988	Palauan	Babier Er a Mormon	Palau		17,000
15	1989	Chamorro	I Lepblon Mormon	Guam, Northern Mariana Islands		58,000
16	1994	Pampango (Kapampangan)	Libru Nang Mormon	Philippines (Central Luzon)		1,900,000
17	1994	Tzotzil	Vun Yu'un Mormōn	Mexico (Chiapas, Oaxaca, Veracruz)	Initially released on audio tape due to low levels of literacy within this language.	405,00
18	1996	Waray-Waray	Libro Ni Mormon	Philippines (Eastern Visayas, minorities elsewhere)		2,600,000
19	1997	Bikolano	An Libro Ni Mormon	Philippines (Bicol Region)		700,000

== Translations in progress ==
Number	Date	Language	Title	Primary Location of Language	Notes	Approx. no. of speakers
*	2017	Efik	Eto Ŋwed Mormon	Nigeria	Sections originally published in 1983	2,400,000
*	2017	Navajo	Naaltsoos Mormon Wolyéhígíí	Southwestern United States	Sections originally published in 1980	169,000
*	2017	Sesotho	Buka ea Mormone	South Africa, Lesotho, Zimbabwe		15,000,000
*	2018	Kazakh	Мормон кітабы	Kazakhstan; minorities in Western China, Mongolia, Russia, Kyrgyzstan, Uzbekistan		21,000,000
*	2023	Bengali	মর্মন বইয়ের	Bangladesh, India (Substantial diaspora including in UK)	Selections published in 1985	260,000,000

== Out of print ==
Date	Language	Title	Primary Location of Language	Notes	Approx. no. of speakers
1869	Deseret Alphabet (English)	𐐜 𐐒𐐳𐐿 𐐱𐑂 𐐣𐐫𐑉𐑋𐐲𐑌	Utah Territory (defunct)	Currently out of print.	NA
1906	Turkish (Armenian Script)	Mormon Kitabı'ndan Seçmeler	1906 Armenian script version (now largely defunct); formerly used in present-day Eastern Turkey, Syria, Lebanon, and the U.S.	Armenian script version was first Asian language translation, now out of print	75,700,000
1937	Armenian, Western	Մօրմոնի Գիրքէն	Middle East, U.S., and elsewhere	1937 complete edition currently out of print; new translation (selections only) published in 1983 but ceased printing in 2018	1,400,000
1981	Hebrew	קטעים נבחרים מתוך ספר מורמון	Middle East, U.S., and elsewhere	Selections of the Book of Mormon in Hebrew was published in 1981 by The Church of Jesus Christ of Latter-day Saints. However, publication was ceased shortly after for reasons not made public by the Church.	9,000,000

== Translations not published by the Church of Jesus Christ of Latter-day Saints ==
The Community of Christ once published in several languages, providing the scriptures in several of the languages above, but most are out of print, with seemingly plans to discontinue printing of scriptures.

Date	Language	Title	Primary Location of Language	Notes	Image	Approx. no. of speakers
1988	Hebrew	דברי ימי הנפיטים	Israel (also Jewish Diaspora)	Independent Restoration Branch translation	Cover of the "Chronicles of the Nephites" (Book of Mormon) in Hebrew	9,000,000
1985	Esperanto	Elektitaj Ĉapitroj de la Libro de Mormon	Esperantujo	approved by the church, but not published by it		60,000
c. 2004	Klingon	mormon paq	Star Trek media franchise	a member of the Seventy said the translation was "fun". Selections only.		unknown
2024	Hebrew	ספר מורמון	Israel (also Jewish Diaspora)	Institute of Ancient Studies		9,000,000
2026	Hebrew	ספר מורמון	Israel (also Jewish Diaspora)	Private translation by Christopher Lambe. Also includes the Doctrine and Covenants, the Pearl of Great Price and the Joseph Smith Translation.		9,000,000

== See also ==
- LDS edition of the Bible
- Standard works
