= Maid of Iowa =

1842 steamboat

History

United States
- Name: Maid of Iowa
- Cost: $4,000
- Launched: 1842
- Fate: Sold, 1845

General characteristics
- Type: Sternwheel steamboat
- Tonnage: 60 tons
- Length: 115 ft (35 m)
- Draft: Less than 2 ft (0.61 m)
- Capacity: 200 passengers

Maid of Iowa was a steamboat first owned and captained by Dan Jones. It was first launched in 1842, and was used as a passenger ship on the Mississippi River. The boat is best known for transporting British Mormon converts to settle in Nauvoo, Illinois.

== History ==
The Maid of Iowa was built and owned by Levi Moffitt and Dan Jones. It was first launched on the Mississippi River in the fall of 1842. Shares of the boat were purchased by Joseph Smith in 1843, for use by the Church of Jesus Christ of Latter Day Saints. The boat played an important role in the establishment of Nauvoo, Illinois, as Mormon converts from abroad landed in New Orleans and journeyed up the Mississippi River to settle in Nauvoo.

The boat was small relative to other steamboats of the time. On one voyage, a large steamboat tried to run the Maid of Iowa off the river, but Captain Jones prevented this by threatening to shoot the pilot of the larger ship.

The first use of the boat was as a ferry between Nauvoo, Illinois and Montrose, Iowa. It was also used to carry freight, such as coal, lumber, lead, military supplies, wheat, corn, and pork. When used by the Church of Jesus Christ of Latter Day Saints, it was also used for pleasure cruises, a church meeting place, and for hauling the workers and supplies for work on the Nauvoo Temple.

After Joseph Smith was killed, it was sold in 1845 to Peter Hoelting to haul freight on the Fox and Wisconsin Rivers. It was last reported carrying freight on Soap Creek in Iowa in 1850.
