= John Silvanus Davis =

Welsh printer, writer, and Mormon missionary (1882–1882)

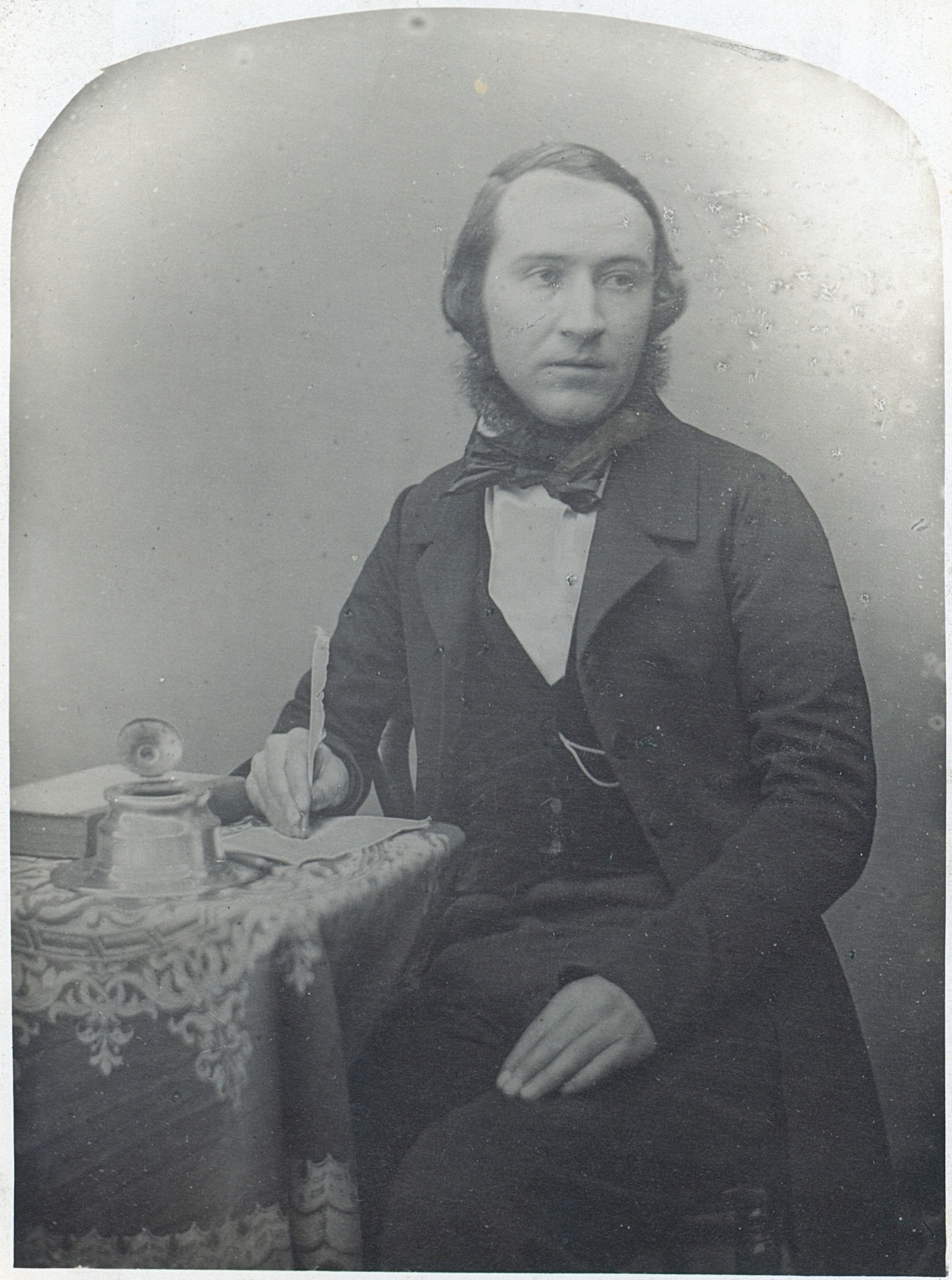
- Born: June 7, 1822; Carmarthen, Wales, United Kingdom of Great Britain and Ireland
- Died: June 11, 1882 (aged 60); Salt Lake City, Salt Lake, Utah, United States
- Occupations: Printer, Writer
- Spouse: Elizabeth Phillips
- Children: Julia Elizabeth Davis
- Parent(s): James Silvanus and Ann Walter

Signature
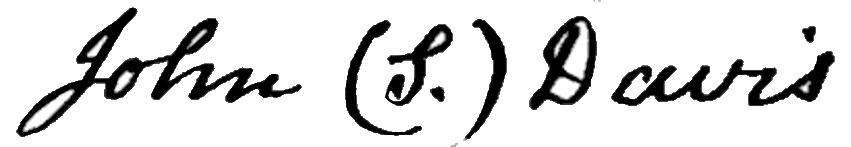

John Silvanus Davis (Note: English: sɪlvɔnʌs; Welsh: Davies) (June 7, 1822 – June 11, 1882) was a Welsh printer, writer, and early defender of The Church of Jesus Christ of Latter-day Saints in South Wales during the mid-1800s. He translated the Book of Mormon, Pearl of Great Price, and Doctrine and Covenants into the Welsh language.

== Early life ==
John Silvanus Davis was born during a period of rapid industrialization in South Wales during the mid-1800s and was baptised into the Congregational Church. His father later started his own congregation, which was common in the Nonconformist chapels of Wales. Davis followed his father's faith as a young man.

Davis received a fair education and developed a talent for literature. He began writing poetry, under his mother's direction, when he was thirteen. His writing appeared in various Welsh magazines. Davis continued to write poems, songs and hymns for the rest of his life, a practice his daughter Julia Elizabeth Davis also enjoyed.

== Life and work in Wales ==
Davis first became interested in the Latter-day Saints (LDS) in 1845 at Llanybydder; he heard about them from Reverend John Jones, the brother of Mormon missionary Dan Jones. John Jones was printing Mormon tracts at the time, which made him deeply unpopular among his fellow printers. Davis was working with Jones as editor, typesetter and pressman, and read the tracts carefully. Davis was baptised on April 19, 1846, by Thomas Harris, and within the next two years was ordained a teacher and priest. Davis strongly defended Mormonism in periodicals, tracts and poems; he engaged directly with local and visiting preachers, and travelled throughout Wales and Dublin as a missionary for his newfound religion.

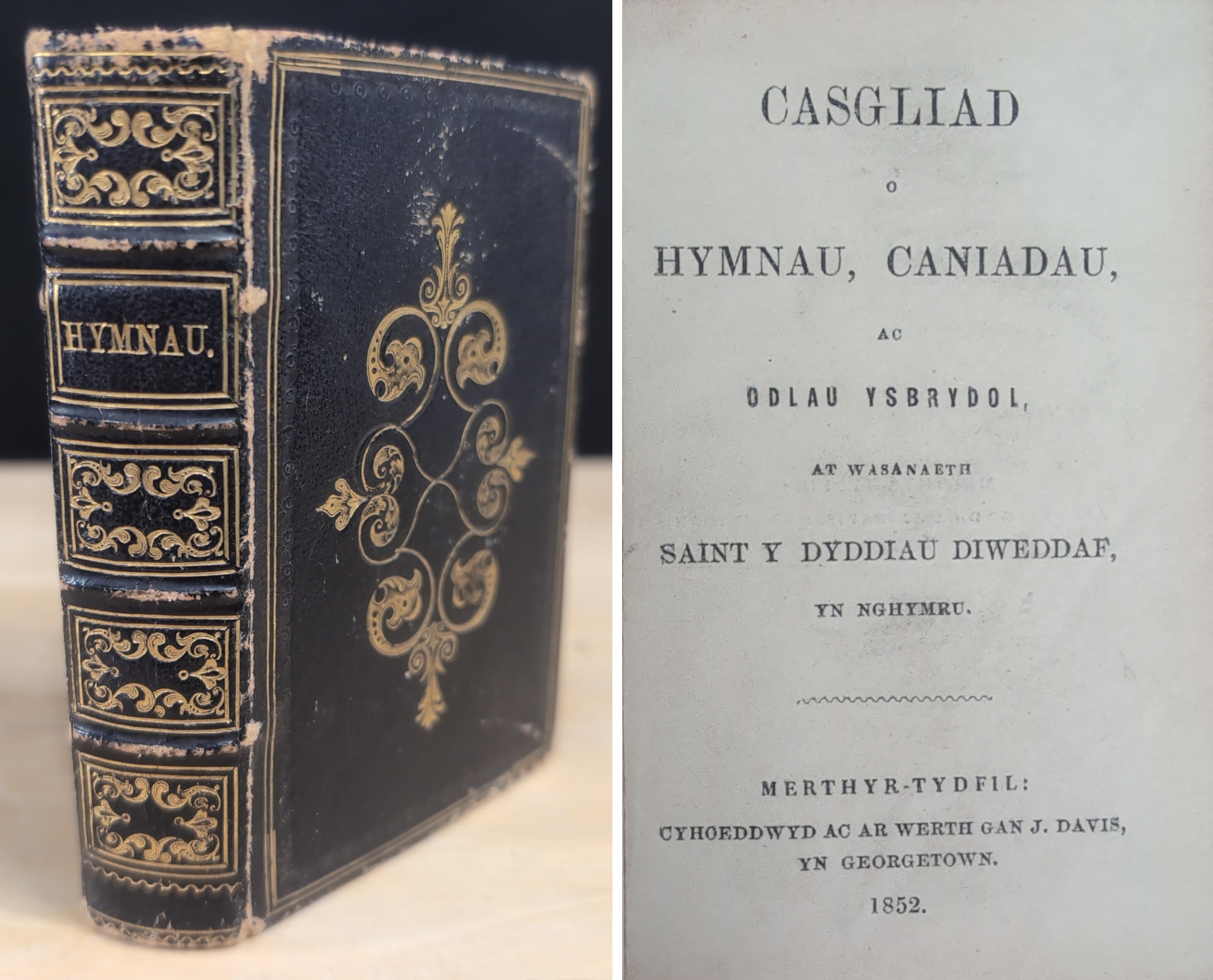
A collection of hymns, songs and spiritual rhymes, for the service of Latter Day Saints, in Wales.

In 1848, Davis was called as first counselor to William S. Phillips, president of the Welsh mission. Davis and Phillips managed the printing office in Llannerdy. Davis printed several periodicals that were influential among the Welsh Saints, most notably Zion's Trumpet, which he edited from 1849 until his emigration in 1854. In addition to translating, Davis wrote edifying tracts explaining and defending Latter-day Saint beliefs. He edited a hymn book with over 500 songs that included many of his own hymns. His dealings with the Latter-day Saints in the Welsh mission brought him into contact with early Mormon leaders such as F. D. Richards, Orson Pratt, Erastus Snow, and future prophet John Taylor.

=== Translation of The Book of Mormon and Doctrine and Covenants ===
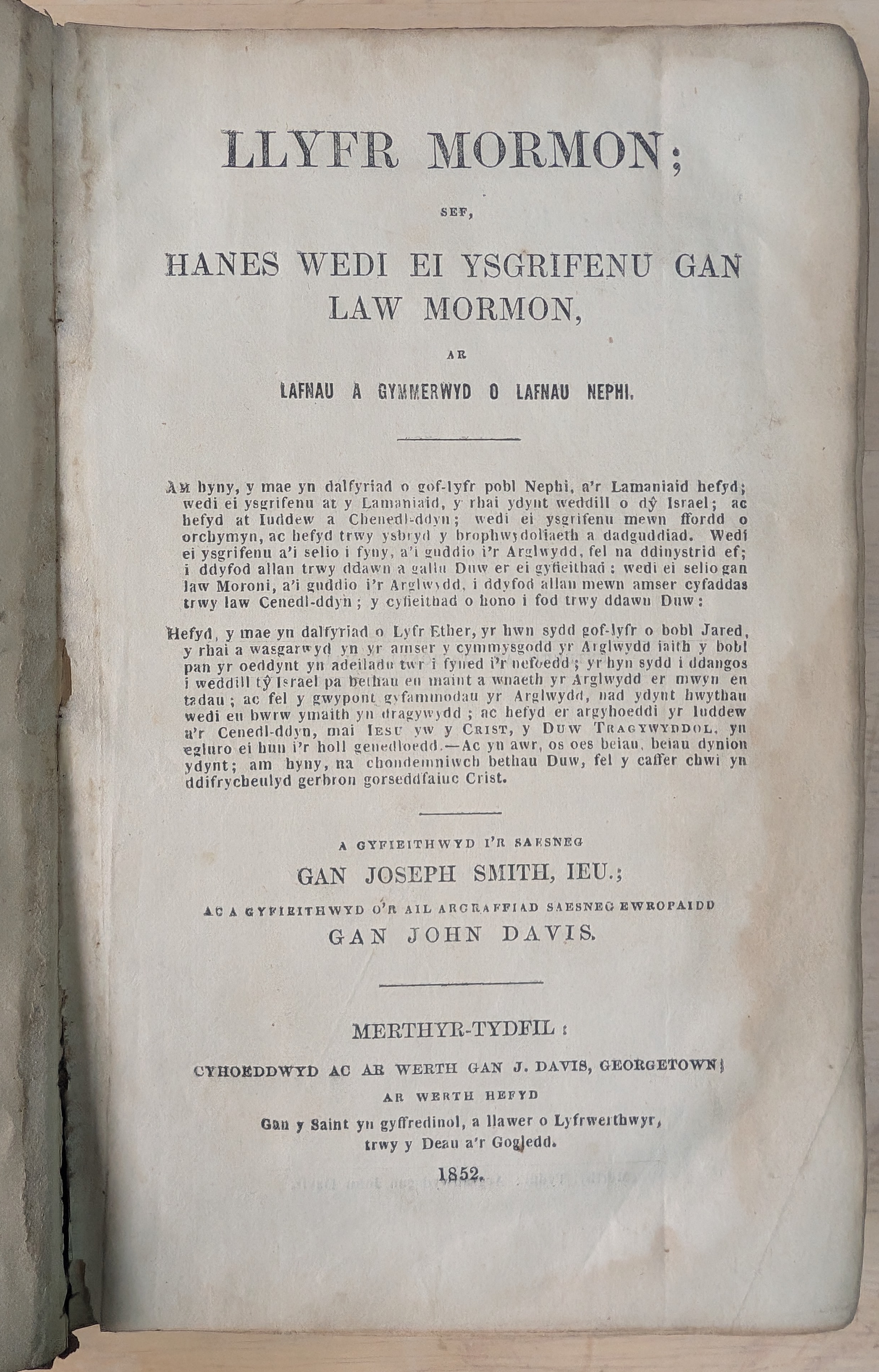
Llyfr Mormon (Welsh Book of Mormon) cover page

The first branch of the Latter-day Saints (LDS) in Wales was established near Overton, Flintshire. LDS missionaries had been preaching there for more than a decade without a Welsh translation of the Book of Mormon because many of the farming communities around Overton did not speak Welsh. In 1842, Elder Lorenzo Snow sent William Henshaw to Merthyr Tydfil in South Wales. While there, Henshaw saw the need for proselytising materials in Welsh. Davis, then 23, was assisting Reverend John Jones, who was printing Mormon tracts at his printing press in Rhydybont near Llanybydder, Carmarthenshire.

By late 1848, Dan Jones wanted to make the standard works of the LDS available to his countrymen who had already been baptised. However, he emigrated to the Salt Lake Valley in 1848 before the translation could be started. Davis was selected to oversee all printing activities for the LDS Church in Wales in his place. Davis's exposure to standard grammar, exposition, logic, and printing served him well as editor of all church publications in Wales. He was one of the most-educated converts in mid-19th-century Wales. Much of his education came from setting type and reading proofs in both Welsh and English.

In August 1850, Orson Pratt counseled Davis to translate and publish Doctrine and Covenants into Welsh. Rather than translating it all at once, he released 16 pages of the scripture in Zion's Trumpet every fortnight. Between February 22, 1851, and August 23, 1851, Davis had released all 20 parts of Doctrine and Covenants. This distribution method worked well and Davis decided to do the same for the Book of Mormon. He started gathering subscriptions for the translation in July 1851. Davis encouraged his distributors and church leaders to be very aggressive in getting subscriptions, but by September 1851, the LDS Church had gathered only 1,500 subscribers. Davis started the translation anyway, and released the final section of the Book of Mormon 31 weeks later. It was called Llyfr Mormon. Davis translated the Book of Mormon for free.

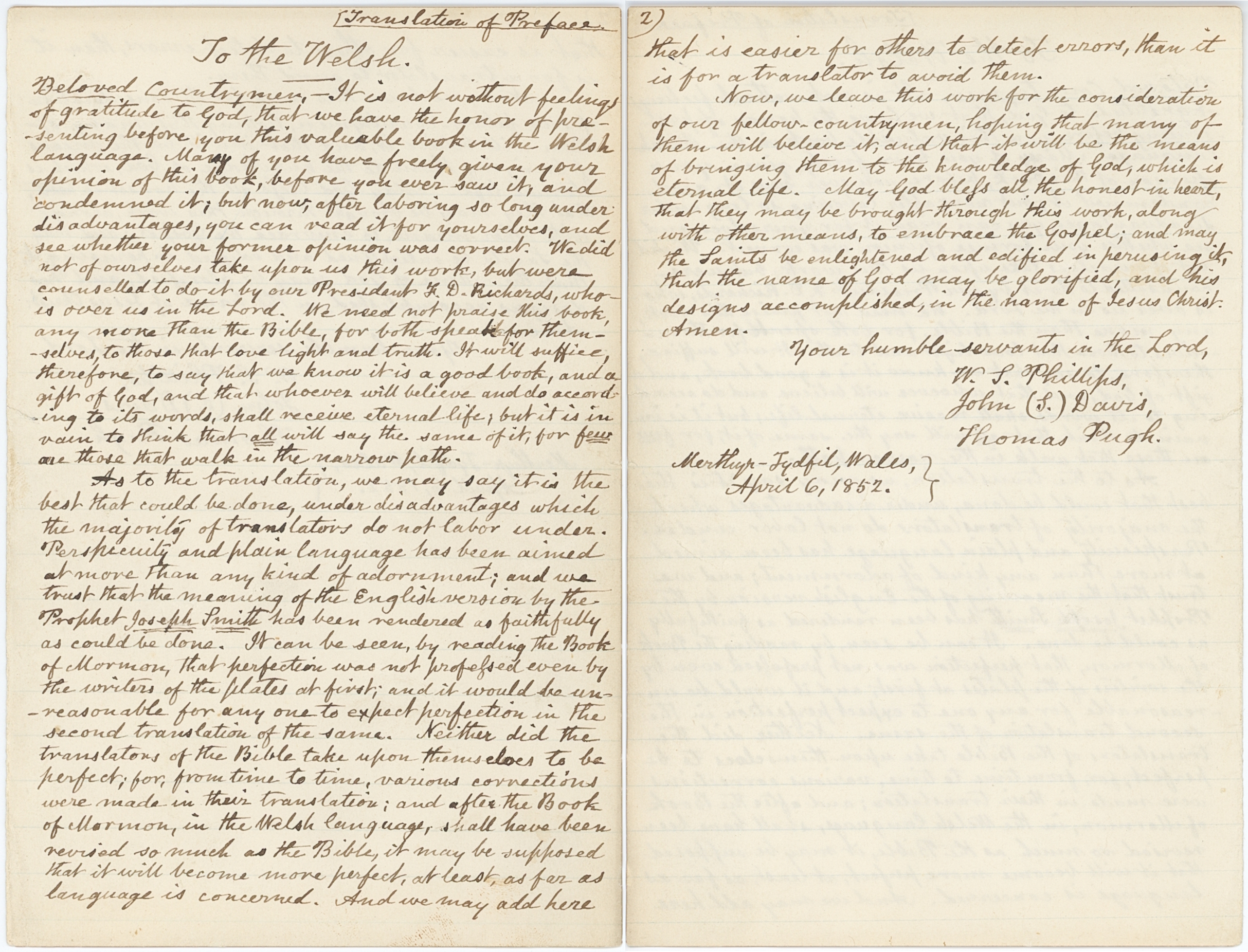
Llyfr Mormon introduction by John S. Davis

In his introduction to the Welsh edition of the Book of Mormon, Davis said the translation was the "best that could be done under disadvantages which the majority of translators do not labor under", and that he sought "perspicuity and plain language" more than "any kind of adornment". The disadvantages he talked about could have been the lack of printing experience among LDS adherents or the cramped conditions of the printing press, which was in his house on John's Street in Georgetown, Merthyr Tydfil.

Davis sent a copy of Llyfr Mormon to the editor of the Baptist periodical Seren Gomer for review. The editor said it was "so perfect a translation" but that Davis had wasted valuable time on something as "worthless a work as the Book of Mormon." The parts were then published and sold all in under one year. The first copy, which was bound in Moroccan leather, was taken to Brigham Young in Utah by emigrating Welsh elders. Davis's translation of Book of Mormon is the only Welsh version of the text. It is also the only translation in a Celtic language.

== Marriage and children ==
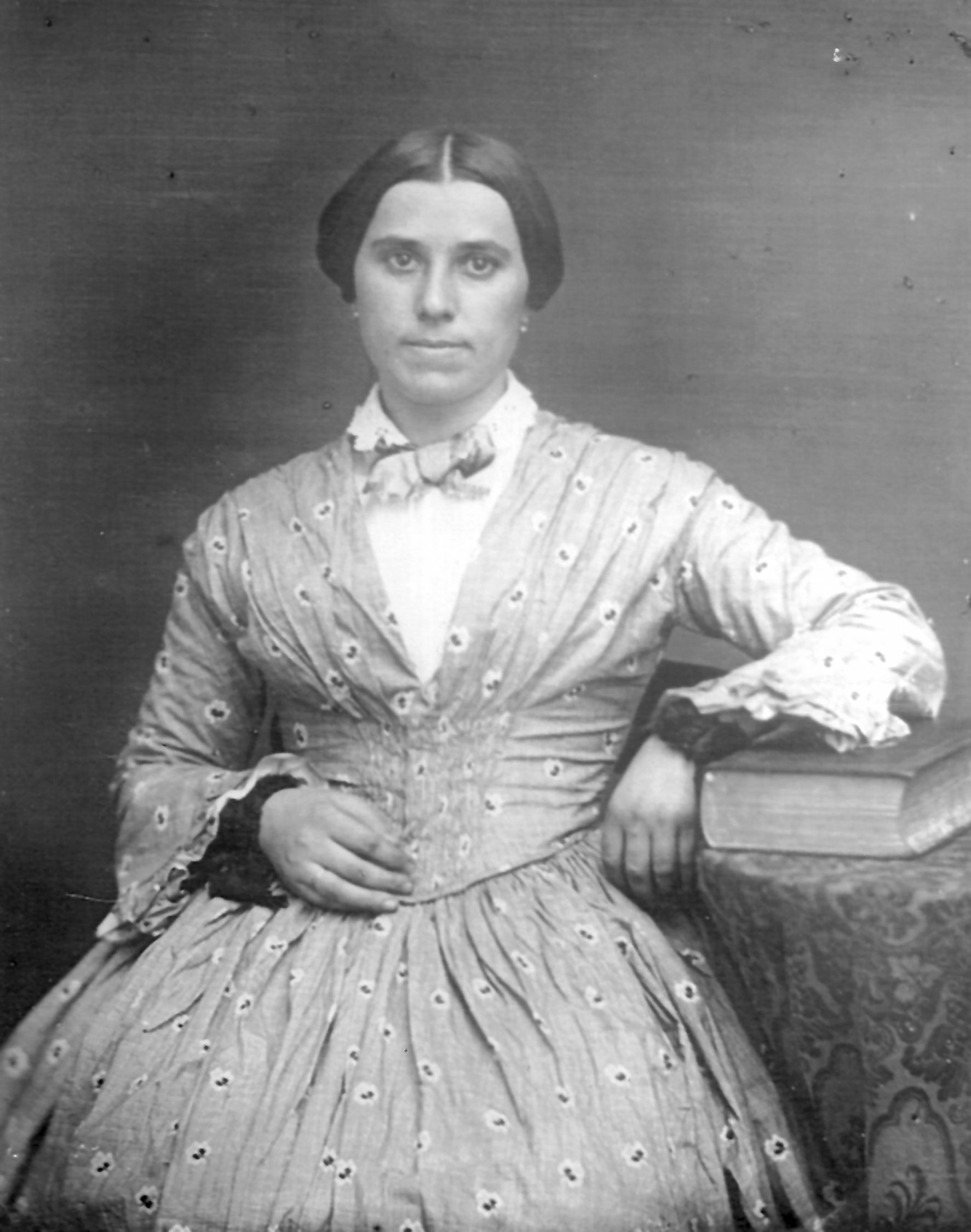
Elizabeth Phillips Davis

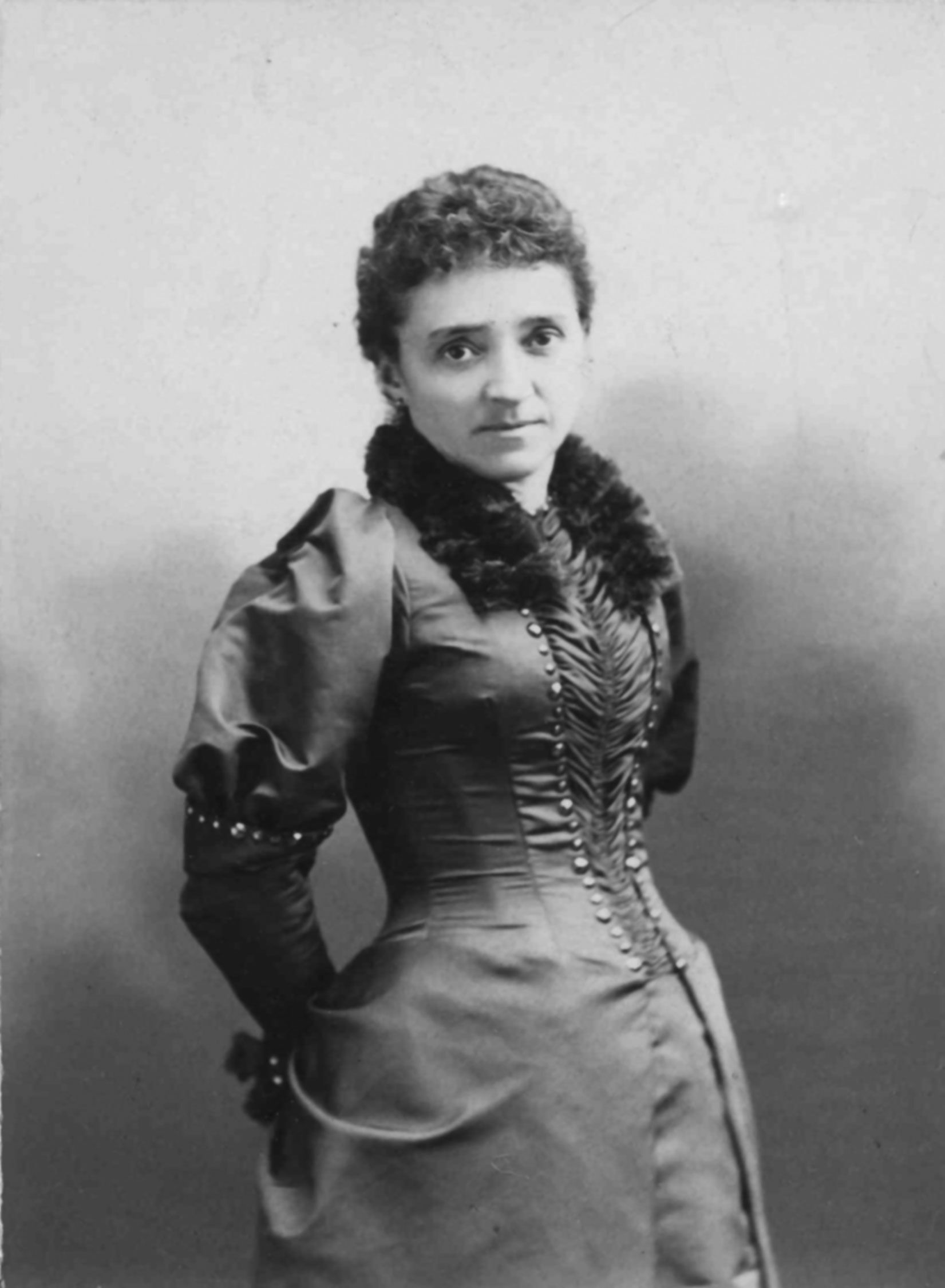
Julia Elizabeth Davis Rawlins

John Silvanus Davis married Elizabeth Phillips (1823–1906) on December 30, 1850, in Merthyr Tydfil, South Wales. They had one daughter, Julia Elizabeth Davis (1851–1946), who married Utah's first democratic senator, Joseph Lafayette Rawlins.

== Emigration to the United States in 1854 ==
Davis and his family started preparations for their emigration to the Great Salt Lake Valley in Utah, United States, as early as November 1853. Davis closed his accounts, and transferred management of the Welsh mission and printing presses to Dan Jones. Davis learned the emigrants were to sail for the US on February 1. With only two weeks' notice, the LDS adherents hastily gathered in from the countryside with what they could. John and Elizabeth visited their parents for the last time before joining the others at Liverpool.

The Davises boarded the ship Golconda in the late evening of January 31, 1854. Four days later, the ship set sail with 477 people. The weather was rough for much of their journey across the Atlantic Ocean but it warmed when they reached Bermuda. Passengers entertained themselves with mock trials, dancing, band music, weddings, and daily religious meetings. Golconda reached the Port of New Orleans six weeks later. The company travelled by steamboat and wagon to St. Louis, Missouri, where they remained for three weeks gathering provisions before heading west across the Great Plains. The Davises travelled in an unknown company along the Mormon Trail.

After leaving St. Louis, they passed several Native Americans who were receiving gifts from the United States government. The Native Americans were also trading with pioneers, emigrants, gold diggers, and other people heading West. Crossing the Great Plains in the 1850s was a dangerous undertaking; it often resulted in hunger, privation, and death. Both Davis and his wife Elizabeth fell ill with cholera along the way. The emigration company arrived in the Great Salt Lake Valley in July 1854. The journey from England had taken seven months and three weeks.

== Life in Salt Lake City 1854–1861 ==
When John Silvanus Davis reached Salt Lake City, he started teaching English to the Welsh Saints. He taught throughout his life topics ranging from writing to astronomy, both of which he knew well. In December 1854, Davis first met Brigham Young, who advised Davis to go into farming until he found Davis was a printer, so he instead directed him to work at Deseret News.

On July 23, 1856, Brigham Young invited several prominent LDS adherents to join him at the mouth of Big Cottonwood Canyon for a Pioneer Day celebration, among them were John and Elizabeth Davis. The next day, the LDS adherents received news of General Albert S. Johnston's army approaching the Great Salt Lake Valley during the Utah War. The Latter-day Saints had been driven from the eastern US and were determined to stand their ground in Utah. Brigham Young ordered his followers to bury the foundation of the Salt Lake Temple to protect it from destruction. The Davises, along with the Deseret News staff and the presses, moved to Fillmore, Utah, until the end of the Utah War. They returned to Salt Lake City in September 1858.

== Career as a printer ==
In the late eighteenth and nineteenth centuries, political and social changes led to a renewed interest in religion. Different Christian sects, including The Church of Jesus Christ of Latter Day Saints (LDS Church; the Mormons), started printing tracts, books, and hymnals teaching their beliefs. These efforts were ecumenical in the beginning of the nineteenth century, but by mid-century, printers started showing more interest in printing for their own denominations. Many printers at the time "placed messianic faith in the power of the press", which was seen as a divine gift that was provided to "turn the unfaithful multitudes toward Christ". LDS Church founder Joseph Smith understood the importance of the press as a tool to preach the Gospel. The night before he was killed, Smith told Dan Jones: "you shall have $1100, and the start for Wales, not with your fingers in your mouth but prepared to buy a press and do business aright".

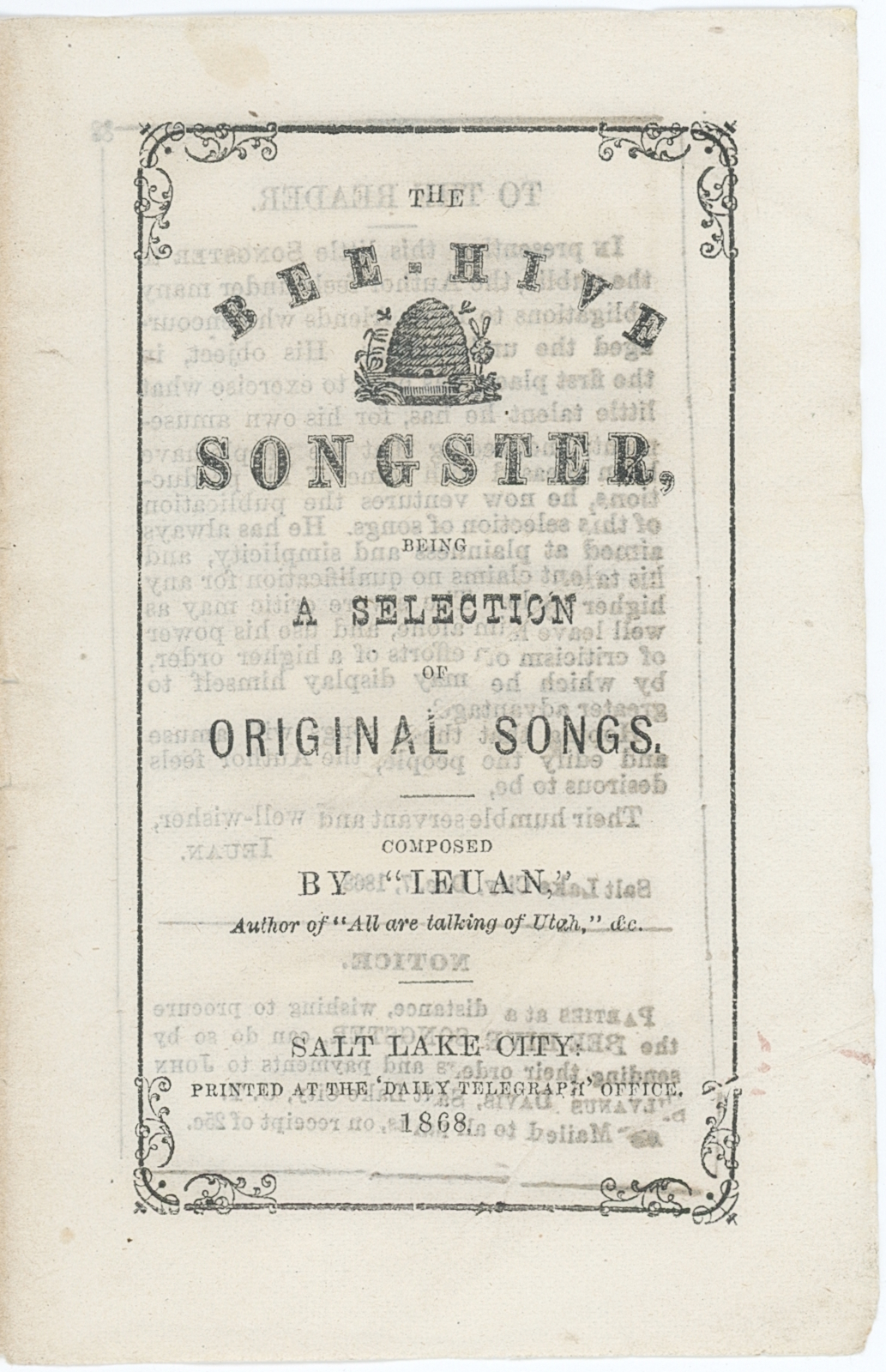
The Bee Hive Songster

Davis played a large role in the production of these religious texts. Nineteenth-century printers were also authors and editors, and had considerable control over the quality of the content of their output. A printer's apprentice was required "to be well versed in all the peculiarities of the English language". Davis was the silent editor and occasional author of Reverend Jones's work. In 1848, Davis left John Jones's print shop and established his own in Merthyr Tydfil. As official printer for the Mormons, he printed thousands of pages of religious material in both English and Welsh. When he emigrated to the United States in 1854, he established presses, periodicals, and newspapers throughout the Western US.

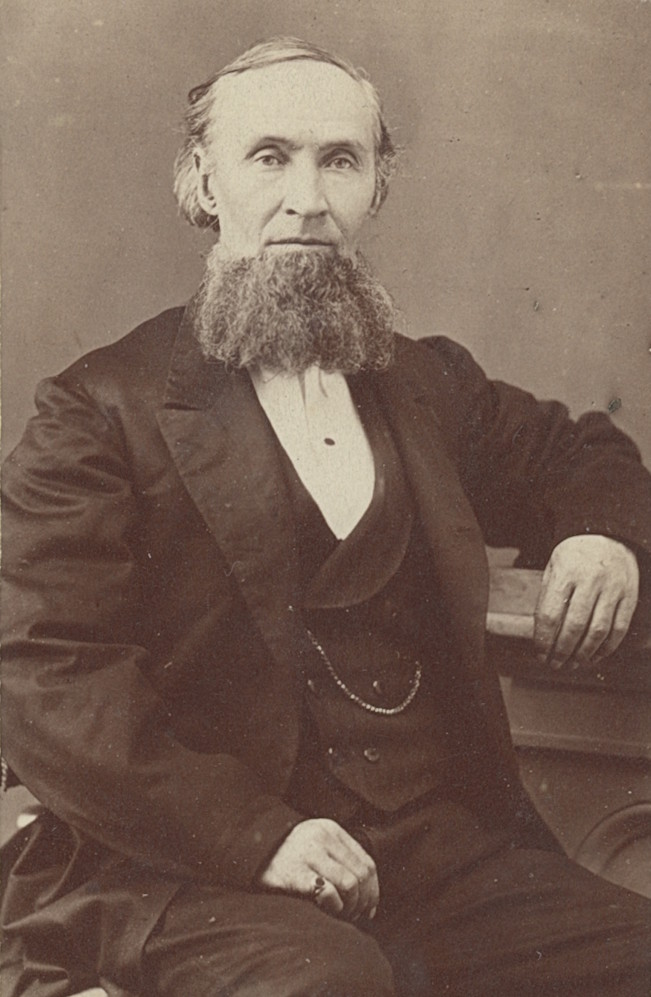
John S. Davis

In addition to his religious and personal writings, he also worked with secular and religious printing establishments such as Deseret News, Valley Tan, and The Mountaineer (later called the Daily Herald). Davis became the foreman of the Daily Herald in August 1859. In December 1858, Davis was elected public printer for the legislative assembly.

== Final years and death ==
In 1861, Davis was forced to give up printing due to ill health. He was unemployed for one year until he and his wife, Elizabeth, opened a small store in their two-storey house with 100 dollars she had saved without his knowledge. The business flourished until 1870, when Brigham Young and other businessmen formed Zion's Co-operative Mercantile Institution (ZCMI) In his final years, Davis also manufactured and sold a root beer called "Cronk Beer", which was popular among Mormons.

Davis died on June 11, 1882, in Salt Lake City after a lingering illness. He "was of a retiring disposition, gentle but impressive in manner, a deliberate thinker, and a vigorous writer".

== Published works ==
- Book of Mormon (Welsh: Llyfr Mormon) (Welsh translation) on April 6, 1852
- Doctrine and Covenants (Welsh translation) in 1850
- The Pearl of Great Price (Welsh translation) on October 16, 1852
- Zion's Trumpet (Welsh: Udgorn Seion), also called Star of the Saints
- "Treatises on Miracles"
- The Bee Hive Songster in 1868. A collection of popular Mormon folk songs.
- A collection of hymns, songs and spiritual rhymes, for the service of Latter Day Saints, in Wales. (Welsh: Casgliad o hymnau, caniadau, ac odlau ysbrydol, at wasanaeth Saint Y Dyddiau Diweddaf, yn Nghymru). A Welsh hymnbook edited by Davis. It contained many of his own songs.

== See also ==
- The Welsh Mission
- The Welsh Saints Project
- The Great Mormon Migration
- Prophet of the Jubilee (Welsh: Prophwyd y Jubili), the Latter-day Saint periodical preceding Zion's Trumpet.
