= Zion's Trumpet =

Welsh-language LDS periodical

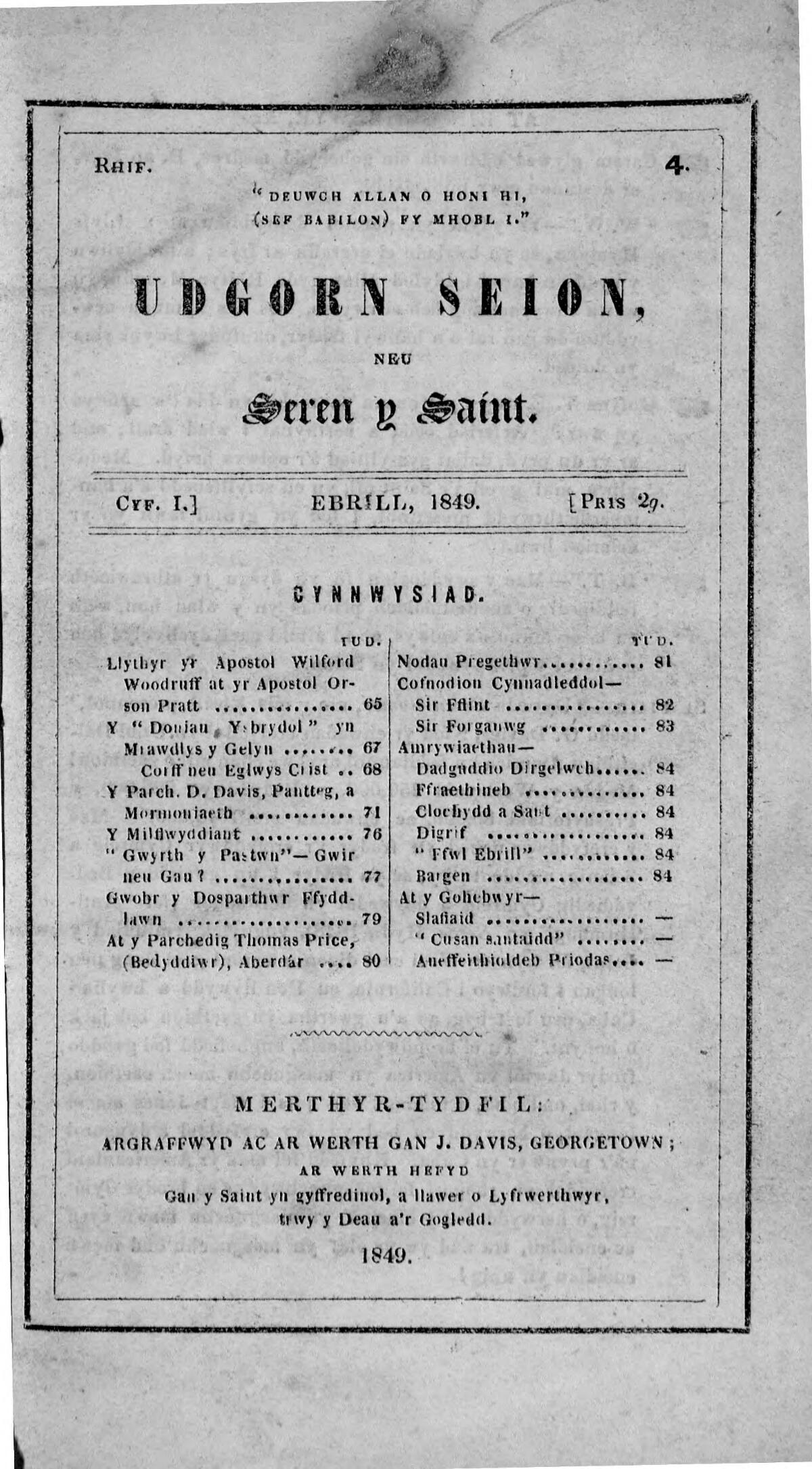
Udgorn Seion

Zion's Trumpet or Trumpet of Zion (Welsh: Udgorn Seion) was the official Welsh-language periodical of the Church of Jesus Christ of Latter-day Saints (LDS Church) published between 1849 and 1862.

== History ==
Zion's Trumpet was the successor publication to Prophet of the Jubilee, which was the first Welsh-language Latter Day Saint periodical. In the final edition of Prophet of the Jubilee, editor Dan Jones announced that he would be returning to the United States and that the church publication would be renamed Zion's Trumpet. The editor for the renamed publication was John Silvanus Davis, a wealthy Latter Day Saint bachelor.

Originally, Zion's Trumpet was published monthly, like its predecessor. In 1851, it began to be issued biweekly and in 1858 it became a weekly. When Dan Jones returned to Wales for his second mission, he became the new editor of the publication. Subsequent editors were Daniel Daniels, Benjamin Evans, and George Q. Cannon. Zion's Trumpet was published on presses in a variety of locations, including Carmarthen, Merthyr Tydfil and Swansea in Wales and at Liverpool in England.

Circulation for Zion's Trumpet peaked at about 2000 during Davis's tenure as editor and was at about 500 for the three years prior to its demise in 1862. Its readership was continually diminished by Latter-day Saint emigration to Utah. In 1862, editor (and head of the LDS Church in Europe) George Q. Cannon decided to suspend publication and encourage Welsh speaking Latter-day Saints to read the English-language Millennial Star. Since 1862, the LDS Church has not published any Welsh-language periodicals.

The full name of the publication was Zion's Trumpet, or, Star of the Saints; containing the principles of the "Dispensation of the fulness of times," in treatises, letters, accounts, poetry, etc. (Welsh: Udgorn Seion, neu, Seren y Saint; yn cynnwys egwyddorion "Goruchwyliaeth cyflawnder yr amseroedd," mewn traethodau, llythyron, hanesion, prydyddiaeth, etc.).

== Translations and commentary ==
- Zion's Trumpet: 1849 Welsh Mormon Periodical - Translation and Commentary
- Zion's Trumpet: 1850 Welsh Mormon Periodical - Translation and Commentary
- Zion's Trumpet: 1851 Welsh Mormon Periodical - Translation and Commentary
- Zion's Trumpet: 1852 Welsh Mormon Periodical - Translation and Commentary
- Zion's Trumpet: 1853 Welsh Mormon Periodical - Translation and Commentary
- Zion's Trumpet: 1854 Welsh Mormon Periodical - Translation and Commentary
- Zion's Trumpet: 1855 Welsh Mormon Periodical - Translation and Commentary
- Zion's Trumpet: 1856 and 1857 Welsh Mormon Periodical - Translation and Commentary

== See also ==
- Prophet of the Jubilee
- List of Latter Day Saint periodicals
