= Pearl Going =

New Zealand mountain climber (born 1985)

Sián-Pearl Going (born 27 January 1985) is a New Zealand media publicist, socialite, and mountaineer.

== Family ==
Going was born in Northland and is a member of the famous Going family, renowned for producing Rugby football players – including Sid Going.

== Socialite ==
She was described in 2008 as a "the hottest property on the party circuit" in Auckland.

== Mountaineering ==
During 2011 and 2012 she concentrated on climbing the seven summits – aiming to break the current record held by Annabelle Bond to be the fastest woman in the world to do so and also the first New Zealand woman.

She climbed the highest peak in Europe Mount Elbrus, Mount Kilimanjaro in Africa and Mount Aconcagua, where she was injured by a rock fall.

== Publicist ==
She has worked as a fashion show organiser and written for the National Business Review.
