= Noel L. Owen =

American chemistry professor

Noel L. Owen is a professor of chemistry at Brigham Young University who served from 1995 to 2001 as associate chair of the Chemistry and Biochemistry Department. He is also a member of BYU's Cancer Research Center.

Owen holds a bachelor's degree from the University of Wales and a Ph.D. from the University of Cambridge. He did post-doctoral work at Harvard University.

Owen is a molecular spectroscopist. Articles co-authored by Owen have been published in Nature, and in many chemistry journals.

== Sources ==
- BYU bio
- BYU Studies article by Owen
