= Dan Jones (Mormon) =

Welsh Mormon missionary, steamboat captain. (1810–1862)

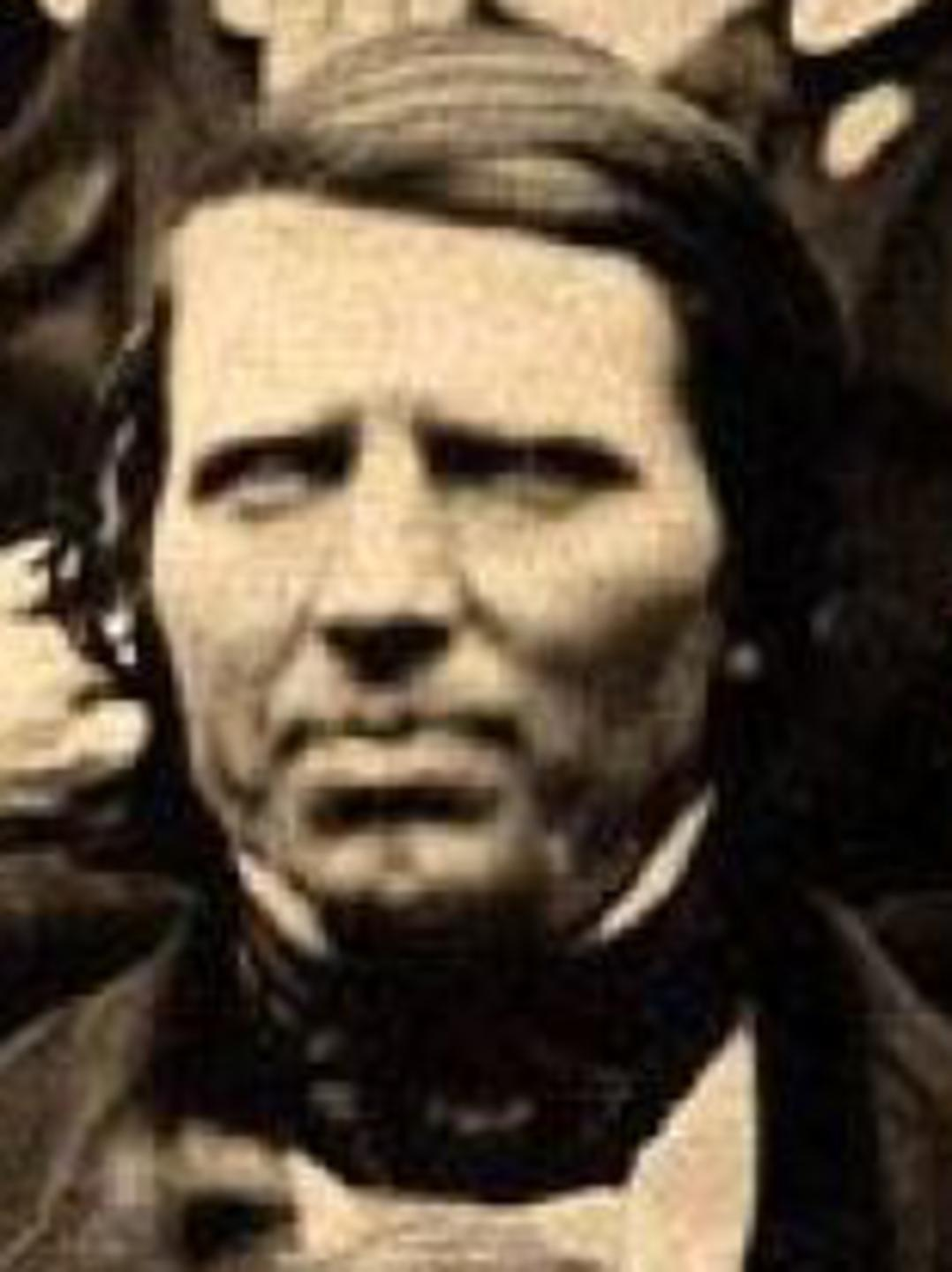
- Born: August 4, 1810; Halkyn, Wales, United Kingdom of Great Britain and Ireland
- Died: January 3, 1862 (aged 51); Fort Utah (Murray), Utah Territory, USA
- Resting place: Provo, Utah, USA; 40°13′29.7″N 111°38′42.7″W
- Occupation(s): Mormon missionary, Steamboat captain
- Spouse(s): Jane Melling; Elizabeth Jones; Mary Matilda LaTrielle
- Children: 12
- Parent(s): Thomas Jones and Ruth Roberts

Dan Jones (August 4, 1810 – January 3, 1862), often referred to as Captain Dan, was an influential Welsh missionary of The Church of Jesus Christ of Latter-day Saints. Jones is well known for having heard the final prophecy of Joseph Smith, namely, that Jones would fulfill a mission to Wales before he died.

== Early life ==
Jones was born in Halkyn, in the county of Flintshire, north-east Wales, the sixth of Thomas Jones and Ruth Roberts's eight children.

When he was sixteen years old, Jones became a sailor. On January 3, 1837, Jones married Jane Melling, a childhood friend from Halkyn. In 1840, Jones and his wife emigrated to the United States, where Jones became captain of the Ripple, a steamship on the Mississippi River. The Ripple primarily carried passengers between New Orleans and St. Louis. After the Ripple struck a rock and sank, Jones captained the Maid of Iowa, which could transport approximately 300 passengers.

== Conversion ==
During his travels on the Mississippi River, Jones heard of The Church of Jesus Christ of Latter-day Saints, which had recently moved its headquarters to Nauvoo, Illinois, a city on the river. Jones sought out the Latter-day Saints to learn about the new religious movement. He believed what the missionaries told him and was subsequently baptized into the Church in January 1843. The following April, Jones used the Maid of Iowa to transport approximately 300 English Latter-day Saint converts from Mississippi to Nauvoo. Jones also used his ship to haul freight required for the building of the Nauvoo Temple. Joseph Smith preached from the deck of the Maid of Iowa on more than one occasion.

== Joseph Smith and the "final prophecy" ==
In June 1844, Joseph and Hyrum Smith were arrested and imprisoned in Carthage Jail. With Willard Richards and John Taylor, Jones was chosen to accompany the Smiths to jail to offer support and protection. The night before Joseph and Hyrum were killed, Joseph Smith asked Jones if he was afraid to die. Jones replied, "Has that time come, think you? Engaged in such a cause, I do not think that death would have many terrors.” Smith replied with what many have identified as his "last prophecy": "You will yet see Wales and fulfill the mission appointed you before you die."

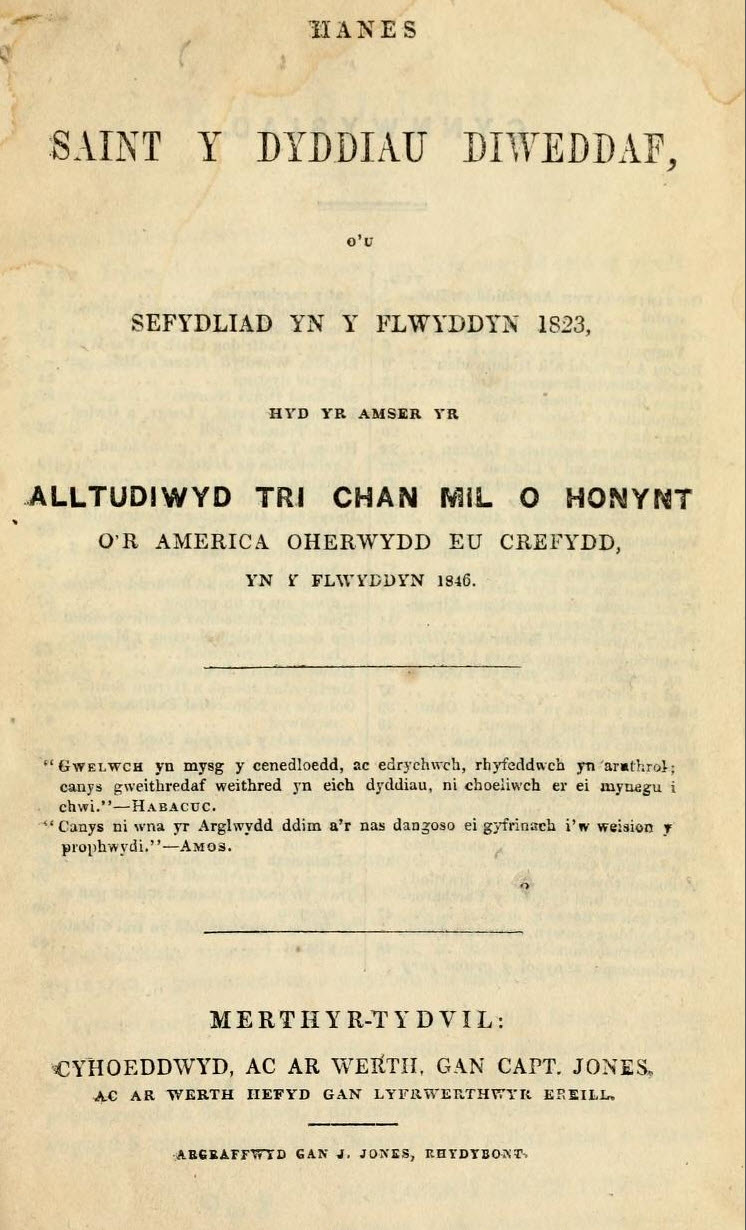
Hanes Saint y Dyddiau Diweddaf, 1846.

== First mission to Wales ==
In late 1844, Brigham Young asked Jones to return to Wales as a missionary for the Church. Jones and his wife traveled to England with Wilford Woodruff and a number of other persons who had been asked to serve as missionaries in the British Isles. After approximately one year and little success, Jones was asked to preside over the missionary efforts in Wales. At this time, there were just over 200 Latter-day Saints in Wales. Under Jones's leadership, between 1845 and 1848 the missionaries in Wales baptized approximately 3600 people. In terms of population, one out of every 278 people in Wales at that time was baptized into The Church of Jesus Christ of Latter-day Saints.

When Jones left Wales, there were seventy-two branches of the Church and 4645 Latter-day Saints. He was succeeded as president of the Welsh Mission by William Samuel Phillips.

In 1846, Jones began to publish a Welsh-language periodical for the Church titled Prophet of the Jubilee (Prophwyd y Jubili). It was the first periodical to be published in a language other than English from the Church. In 1847, Jones published the most famous of his many Welsh-language pamphlets and tracts, "Hanes Saint y Dyddiau Diweddaf" ("History of the Latter-day Saints").

== Pioneer ==
On February 26, 1849, Jones departed Wales with over 300 Welsh Latter-day Saint converts. Jones sailed from Liverpool to New Orleans on the Buena Vista and from New Orleans to Council Bluffs, Iowa by riverboat. Once Jones and the Welsh converts arrived in Council Bluffs, the Church organized the first Welsh speaking branch of the Church in the United States with Jones serving as the branch president.

On July 13, 1849, Jones and many of his Welsh converts left Council Bluffs with other pioneers in the George A. Smith company. Jones arrived in the Salt Lake Valley on October 26.

Like many early Latter-day Saints, Jones practiced plural marriage. On November 8, 1849, shortly after his arrival in the Utah Territory, Jones married his first plural wife, Elizabeth Lewis.

== Second mission to Wales ==
After arriving in the Utah Territory, Jones settled in Manti and was elected mayor in 1851. However, in 1852 Church president Brigham Young asked Jones to again return to Wales as a missionary. During this second mission, which lasted until 1856, Jones baptized approximately 2000 persons in Wales, most of whom eventually immigrated to Utah. In 1852, Jones oversaw John S. Davis's translation of the Book of Mormon into the Welsh language; It was only the third language other than English that the book had been published in (previous translations having been published in Danish and French). Jones was briefly the editor of Udgorn Seion, the Church's Welsh language periodical that succeeded Jones's Prophwyd y Jubili.

== Later life and death ==
Jones returned to Utah in 1856. However, upon his return he began to suffer ill health, probably partially as a result of his missionary exertions and life's extensive travels. Jones became the captain of the Timely Gull on the Great Salt Lake, a vessel that was owned by Brigham Young and used to carry salt, cedar wood, and flagstone. On 8 November 1849, Jones married a second plural wife, Elizabeth Jones Lewis, in Salt Lake City. On February 18, 1857, Jones married his third plural wife, Mary Matilda LaTrielle, in Salt Lake City.

Jones' first wife, Jane, died on February 24, 1861. Less than one year later, on the 24th anniversary of his marriage to Jane, Jones died of tuberculosis at Provo, Utah Territory, at the age of fifty-one. Jones was survived by six children—two from each of his wives. His first wife gave birth to eight children that did not survive childhood.

== Legacy ==
President Gordon B. Hinckley had stated that Jones "must certainly be included in the half dozen or so most productive missionaries in the history of the Church.One of the dormitories at the Missionary Training Center in Provo, Utah, is called the Dan Jones Building. An official publication of the Church pays tribute to Jones, stating that, "Dan Jones, [was] one of the greatest missionaries" in Church history.

== Published works ==
- Prophet of the Jubilee
- Zion's Trumpet
