= William Swain (diplomat) =

Marshallese diplomat

William J. Swain has served as a diplomat of the Marshall Islands to the United Nations. He was also the translator of the Book of Mormon into the Marshallese language.

Swain was raised Catholic. He joined the Church of Jesus Christ of Latter-day Saints (LDS Church) while studying in Arizona. He later served a mission for the LDS Church in Chicago and studied at Brigham Young University–Hawaii.

Swain has also been a candidate for the Marshall Islands National Legislatuire.

Swain is the president of Pa Emman Kabjere, a Marshallese community organization in Hawaii that has been one of the main organizations involved in opposing Hawaii's attempts to cut off healthcare funding for Micronesian immigrants, many of whom suffer cancer and other diseases at least in part caused by United States nuclear testing done in the Marshall Islands.
