= Prophet of the Jubilee =

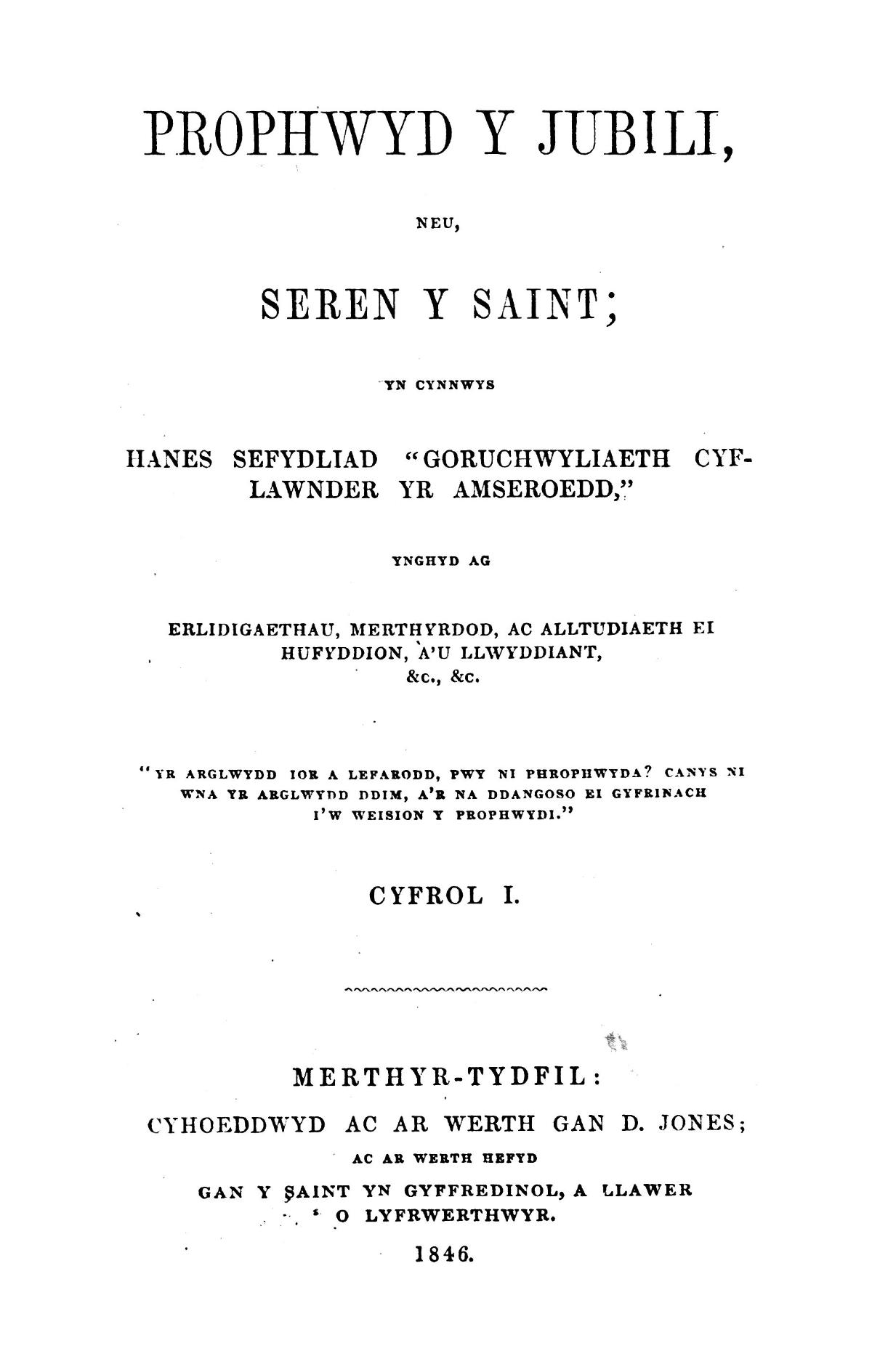

Prophet of the Jubilee (Welsh: Prophwyd y Jubili), also called Star of the Saints (Welsh: Seren y Saint), was a Welsh-language monthly periodical of the Church of Jesus Christ of Latter Day Saints between 1846 and 1848. It was the first Latter Day Saint periodical that was published in a language other than English.

== History ==
The first edition of Prophet of the Jubilee was printed in Rhydybont, Wales, in July 1846. One edition was published every month until the final issue was published in December 1848.

The editor of Prophet of the Jubilee was Dan Jones, who was presiding over the Mormon missionaries in Wales at the time. All but the final two editions of the periodical were printed on the press owned by Jones's non-Mormon older brother, the Reverend John Jones. The final two editions were published at Carmarthen on the press owned by John S. Davis, a young Latter Day Saint bachelor.

Prophet of the Jubilee was similar in content to the Millennial Star, the church periodical targeted towards English speaking Latter Day Saints in the British Isles. A substantial amount of material was borrowed from the Millennial Star and translated into Welsh for publication in Prophet of the Jubileei, especially doctrinal writings and letters from church leaders. Other contents were conference reports, progress in baptisms, poetry, accounts of miraculous healings, accounts of persecution and conversion, and an occasional "thumbing of the nose" at the enemy's lack of success in forestalling the spread of Mormonism in Wales. In almost every issue, there is a defense against an attack on Mormonism that had been printed in one of the other Christian periodicals in Wales.

The only fact known about the circulation of Prophet of the Jubilee is a comment made by Dan Jones at a December 1847 church meeting where he comments that he had increased the circulation to 1200. The cover price of Prophet of the Jubilee was originally three pence, which was cut to two pence with the January 1847 edition. Prophet of the Jubilee ceased publication when Dan Jones ended his first Welsh mission and returned to the United States. In 1849, Zion's Trumpet succeeded Prophet of the Jubilee as the official Welsh language periodical of the church; the new periodical was edited by John Davis.

== Full name ==
The complete name of the periodical was Prophet of the Jubilee, or, Star of the Saints; containing an account of the establishment of the "Dispensation of the fulness of times," together with the persecutions, martyrdom, and exile of its adepts, and their success (Welsh: Prophwyd y Jubili, neu, Seren y Saint; yn cynnwys hanes sefydliad "Goruchwyliaeth cyflawnder yr amseroedd," ynghyd ag erlidigaethau, merthyrdod, ac alltudiaeth ei hufyddion, a'u llwyddiant).

== Issues ==
=== 1846 ===
- July 1846

Greeting of the publisher to his compatriots. Greeting of the prophet. Angelic ministry is logical. Present-day ministering of angels is scriptural. Angelic beings and their influences. Present-day ministering of angels. Early history of Joseph Smith. Revelation of the Gold Plates. Fulfillment of a prophecy. A miracle! A miracle! At last!. To the Editors of the Baptist. Verses of greeting.

- August 1846

What is "Mormonism?". First principles of Christianity. Revelation of the gold plates. Description of the plates. Persecution concerning the plates. Story of the translation of the plates. The Book of Mormon - its description. Early inhabitants of America. Jewish inhabitants of America. Manchester Annual Conference. Account of the Merthyr Tydfil Conference. Counter-exhortation.

- September 1846

Testimony of church historians regarding miracles. Appearance of Christ to the American Indians. Testimonies about the Book of Mormon. Proofs of the truthfulness of the Book of Mormon. Testimony of Indian traditions. Substance of a sermon on miracles. The editor of the True Baptist.

- October 1846

The commentators are with us!!!. Fate of the human body. Additional testimonies of the truthfulness of the Book of Mormon. Joseph Smith's authority to baptize, preach, &c., together with the establishment of the Church. Further proofs of the Book of Mormon. Epistle of Demetrius, the silversmith. Review. Substance of a sermon on the miracles. Exile of three hundred thousand Americans from their country, for their religion!!. Letter from the "Camp of Israel". Success of truth.

- November 1846

The spirit of accusation. Comfort under persecution. The law and the gospel. The Revivalist a Mormon! Signs of the times. Virtue's vengeance. Establishment of the Saints in Kirtland, and the persecution in Missouri. Review. Substance of a sermon on the miracles. The Joint Stock Company. American mission to Britain. Manchester Conference. The City of Nauvoo. A call to sinners.

- December 1846

The body or church of Christ. Elias. Defense of the Saints versus the accusations of Thomas Jones, Merthyr, and others. Review. Substance of a sermon on the miracles. Monmouthshire Conference. Missionary work in the counties of Wales. The gospel in England, Scotland, &C. Australia. The South Sea Islands. The first resurrection.

=== 1846 Wrappers ===
- July 1846 Wrapper

To the subscribers. To the Saints. To our libelers. Conditions. To the readers. Publications of the Latter-day Saints.

- August 1846 Wrapper

Conditions. To our subscribers. Publications of the Latter-day Saints. Reuben Hedlock, American emigration, commission, forwarding, and general shipping agent. Merthyr Tydfil.

- September 1846 Wrapper

To our readers. Conditions. Thomas Ward, American emigration, commission, forwarding, and general shipping agent. Merthyr Tydfil. Publications of the Latter-day Saints.

- October 1846 Wrapper

To our readers. Thomas Ward, American emigration, commission, forwarding, and general shipping agent. Merthyr Tydfil. Publications of the Latter-day Saints.

- November 1846 Wrapper

Greeting. Published recently. Merthyr Tydfil. Conditions. Publications of the Latter-day Saints.

- December 1846 Wrapper

Change in size of the Prophet. Published recently. Merthyr Tydfil. Publications of the Latter-day Saints.

=== 1847 ===
- January 1847

Proclamation to the Welsh. Parable. Epistle of Alexander, the coppersmith. The Latter-day Saints versus sectarians. Merthyr Tydfil Conference. The plague. Comfort of the Saints. War in Nauvoo again. The signs follow the Baptists!. Popery.

- February 1847

Faith. Elder. "Defense of the Mormons". The parable of the lambs and the beasts. Signs of the times. Baptisms by the Saints in January, 1847. Assignments of the preachers.

- March 1847

Catechism for the colleges of the "Reverences". Duties of the priest. The American press sides with the Saints. Signs of the times. Good news from California [Utah]. Night Vision!. The Ivorites excommunicating their members because of their religion!!!. Baptisms by the Saints in February 1847. Assignments of the preachers. Glamorgan Conference. Monmouth Conference. Catechism for the colleges of the "Reverends". Duties of the teachers. News from the Saints in the wilderness. The most remarkable wonders of the seven millennia!. Description of California [Utah]. Portrayal of the religious world in a dream!. An example of oppression on the Saints. An example to prove the divinity of Mormonism!. To our distributors. Announcements. Baptisms in March.

- April 1847

Catchism for the colleges of the "Reverences". Duties of the teachers. News from the Saints in the wilderness. The most remarkable wonders of the seven millennia!. Description of California [Utah]. Portrayal of the religious world in a dream!. An example of oppression on the Saints. An example to prove the divinity of Momronism!. To our distributors. Announcements. Baptisms in March.

- May 1847

The "Hater of Deceit" proved a lover, a maker, and a publisher, of "deceit" himself. "Mother's Gift," or the first catechism for the children of the Saints. Merthyr Conference. Parable of the tree that bears nine kinds of fruit! Llanybydder Branch.

- June 1847

Tenets of baptism. Zion. Its location, &c.. The "Hater of Deceit" proved a lover, a maker, and a publisher, of "deceit" himself. Loudmouth "Meiriadog" from Llanfaircaereinion forfeiting his head to be a football!!. News from the "First Camp". Quotation from a letter from one of the "Twelve.". The gathering to Zion. Monmouthshire Conference. Prophecy of Mr. Wesley about Mormonism!. Safe landing of the two apostles. Plenty in the midst of famine!. America and Mexico. Ireland. To our distributors. Glamorgan Conference. Prize for selling books!.

- July 1847

Duties of the Saints after baptism. Wisdom is power. Intellectual power of man. Review of the press. Character of Joseph Smith. Address of Governor Ford to the people of the State of ILlinois. How can the husband make the wife good, whatever she be?. America and Mexico. Mormon settlement in California. Saints in the States. Apostles Pratt and Taylor. Gospel of the angel. Capt. Jones on Mormonism, in 1846. Glamorgan Conference.

- August 1847

Who is the "Ancient of Days?". The "Rev. W. R. Davies, from Dowlais," and his cruel and shameful persecution again! - again!!. Truthful marriage. Good news for the Saints. Signs of the times. News from California [Utah]. New and nearer way to California [Utah]. Excellent advice. Diseases in America. Glamorgan Conference. Mexico. Assignments of the preachers. Capt. Jones on Mormonism, in 1846.

- September 1847

The sons of God. The "Rev. W. R. Davies, from Dowlais," and his cruel and shameful persecution again! - again!!. The "Hater of Deceit" proving himself a false prophet again!!. To the one who calls himeslf "The Traveler of Nantyglo, or William Williams. Garway Conference. Accounts. To our distributors.

- October 1847

Apostles. Review of the lecture of the Rev. D. Jones, Cardiff, on "The excellence of the Christian religion". Quotation of the letter of Apostle O. Hyde. Greeting to the Saints. The sign of the Prophet Jonah. The late Rev. John Wesley a Mormon!. The spiritual gifts. Catechism of the Saints. News from the elders. State of the churches. Announcement.

- November 1847

Review of the lecture of the Rev. D. Jones, Cardiff, on "The excellence of the Christian religion". Extract from the letter of John Bowen from Llwyni. Baptism. The persecution of Dowlais, and the good it has done. Description of California [Utah]. Proclamation to the Saints. News from the Saints who are in the wilderness.. Monmouth Conference. To our distributors . Next Glamorgan Conference.

- December 1847

"Speaking with tongues" of the New Testament, and Mormonism!. The "Times" and its lying slime on the Saints again! Again!!. The Star of Gomer and its religious blasphemy . The Saints in California [Utah]. The best treasure. The state of the churches. To our distributors. Next Glamorgan Conference.

=== 1848 ===
- January 1848

Title page. Forward. Contents. A greeting at the beginning of the New Year. "Mormon Miracle". Tea Party of the American ladies for the benefit of the Mormons. Excerpt of the letter of Apostle O. Hyde to O. Spencer. "Dwelling place of the Mormons". Glamorgan Conference. The Welsh pledge to the American Saints. Peter the Bard is a Mormon!. Announcement.

- February 1848

Reflections on the year gone by. Proofs of the need for the "Gift of Healing" in the church of the Baptists. A peek at the Slugger, and the Dowlais shopkeeper. Praise for the review of Capt. Jones. Letter of J. James, Victoria. "Nightingale of the Glade" and Mormonism. Letter of Abednego Williams, Nantyglo. Who is ready to start home?. Distributors, take note!. Announcement.

- March 1848

Prophecy of Saint Thomas, the Martyr. A pagan proves two of the sectarian rabbis liars. Return of the prodigals. What is the matter. Excommunication of Phillip Seix, Blaina, Monmouthshire, from the Church. State of the churches, and the baptism. Announcement.

- April 1848

A new and excellent way to spread knowledge of the gospel. Epistle of the Twelve Apostles. Nauvoo. The persecution in Pembrokeshire. Remarkable healing of broken bones. A remarkable dream and its fulfillment. Announcement.

- May 1848

Letter from William Davies. Miracle of the Independents!!. Twofold miracle!. Letter of Elder Abel Evans. Greeting of the "Prophet of the Jubilee". Verses of D. James, Victoria. The Saint out of prison, and his defense. Monmouth Conference. What is to be done with the editor of the Star of Gomer?. State of the churches and the baptism. Announcement.

- June 1848

Azariah Shadrach a Mormon!. False accusations of the Baptists against the Saints again!. Another example of the cruelty of the Baptists, and of the tenderness of God, towards the Saints. Questions, and their answers. Invitation to God. The Baptists baptize "satanists and demons!!". Letter of President Brigham Young. Travel account of the Mormon journey from Council Bluffs to California [Utah]. Announcements.

- July 1848

Description of California [Utah]. Testimony of Mormgan David, Felinfoel. "Deceit of the Mormons". Letter of W. Woodruff, one of the Apostles. A question, and its answer. The condemnatory sentence of Jesus Christ. Names of the Twelv Apostles of the "Dispensation of the fulness of times". What is to be done with the persecutors of the Saints?. Letter of D. Roberts, Llwynygell. The true church of Jesus Christ. Song of entreaty. Letter of Elder W. Morgan. To our subscribers. Announcements.

- August 1848

To the readers of the Prophet. The persecution of the Saints in Cwmbychan and Bryn! Twenty-nine Saints are turned from the mine because of their religion!! - Sectarian stewards attempt to starve about fifty wives and children of the Saints!!!. A call to a sinner. Anti-Mormon sermon. Restoration of the gospel. Annual conference of Wales. Tea Party of the Missionary Society. All the Saints, take note!.

- September 1848

Description of California [Utah]. Testimony of Rees Price, Dowlais. Why am I an unbeliever?. The greatest freedom. The death of covetousness. Remarkable healing of a fire burn!. Letter of Thomas Richards, from America. Comfort of the Saints under persecution. A new song. Greeting to the Saints. Decay. How to apportion the fruits of the earthly elements. To prevent thefts. The Millennium. Announcements. To the distributors. Books for sale.

- October 1848

The sectarians believe in miracles at last!. President Orson Pratt's general epistle to all the Saints in Britain, greeting. To prevent rape and adultery. The means to have a perfect government, and to sustain it. Give their father to the orphans, and her husband to the widow. Signs of the times. Disease of the potatoes. The cholera morbus. Hail to California [Utah]. State of the churches, and the baptisms. Announcements.

- November 1848

Lecture of Apostle O. Pratt at the Manchester Conference. Healing of the mute and deaf through the power of God. A letter on the same matter. Counsels to the emigrants to California [Utah]. Discovery of a gold ore mine in California [Utah]!. The blind man and his book. The Eastern Welsh Conference. The Glamorgan Conference.

- December 1848

Lecture of the Apostle O. Pratt at the Manchester Conference. Observations on a sermon about "The Latter-day Saints and miraculous gifts". Truth versus lie. Railway from Council Bluffs to Salt Lake City!. The Saints' farewell. Slave trade of the sectarians!. Letter to the editor. Song in persecution. Monmouthshire Conference. Who will go?. Sorrow and bliss. Enlargement of our monthly publication!. Zion's Trumpet!. The Glamorgan Conference. To our distributors. To our subscribers, &c..

== See also ==
- List of Latter Day Saint periodicals
