= Grouard (disambiguation) =

Grouard is a hamlet in Alberta, Canada.

Grouard may also refer to:

== People ==
- Benjamin Franklin Grouard (1819–1894), Latter Day Saint missionary to the Society Islands
- Émile Grouard (1840–1931), French Roman Catholic priest
- Frank Grouard (1850–1905), U.S. Army scout in the American Indian War
- Serge Grouard (born 1959), member of the National Assembly of France

== Other uses ==
- Grouard (electoral district), a provincial electoral district in Alberta, Canada
