= S. George Ellsworth =

Samuel George Ellsworth (1916–1997) was an American historian specializing in Western United States history and the history of the Church of Jesus Christ of Latter-day Saints. He was a founding editor of the Western Political Quarterly.

== Biography ==
=== Early life and education ===
Ellsworth was born in Safford, Arizona but was raised in California, Utah and Missouri as well as Arizona. He graduated from Kansas City High School and began his college studies at Kansas City Junior College. He then served a mission for the LDS Church in the North Central States Mission, headquartered in Minneapolis.

After his mission Ellsworth went to Logan, Utah where he studied at what is now Utah State University earning a bachelor's degree in history and math. He was appointed principal of the LDS Seminary in Bunkerville, Nevada as well as working as a teacher at Virgin Valley High School. In October 1942 Ellsworth married Maria Smith, a daughter of Asahel H. Smith and his wife Pauline Udall, in the Mesa Arizona Temple.

=== Military service ===
In late 1942 Ellsworth joined the United States Army Air Corps. He served much of the war at Hammer Field in California, but from January 1945 until June 1946 was a chaplain stationed in the Philippines.

=== Post-graduate education ===
After World War II Ellsworth pursued further studies at the University of California, Berkeley. He earned an MA and Ph. D. both in American history with his thesis and dissertation topics being about missionary work of the LDS Church in the United States and Canada during parts of the 19th Century.

=== Academic career ===
Ellsworth spent his career from 1951-1983 as a professor of history at Utah State University. From 1966-1969 he was chair of the USU History Department. During this time he served one year as a visiting professor at West Virginia University and later one year as a visiting professor at Brigham Young University.

Among major works Ellsworth edited the journals of Addison Pratt, the autobiography of Louisa Barnes Pratt and Dear Ellen: Two Mormon Women and Their Letters. Ellsworth's wife was descended from Addison and Louisa Barnes Pratt.

Ellsworth also wrote the biography of Samuel Claridge entitled Samuel Claridge: Pioneering the Outposts of Zion. Ellsworth also wrote a Sesquecentennial History of the LDS Church in French Polynesia with Kathleen C. Perrin and a history of the early LDS settlement in the area of Logandale, Nevada.

== Sources ==
- BYU Studies. Vol. 38, no. 4 review of Autobiography of Louisa Barnes Pratt
- USU Library Archives collection bio
