= Winchester Town Hall =

Winchester Town Hall may refer to:

- Winchester Town Hall (Massachusetts), listed on the US National Register of Historic Places (NRHP)
- Winchester Town Hall (New Hampshire), NRHP-listed

== See also ==
- Winchester Guildhall, Hampshire, England
