= Conant Public Library =

- U.S. National Register of Historic Places
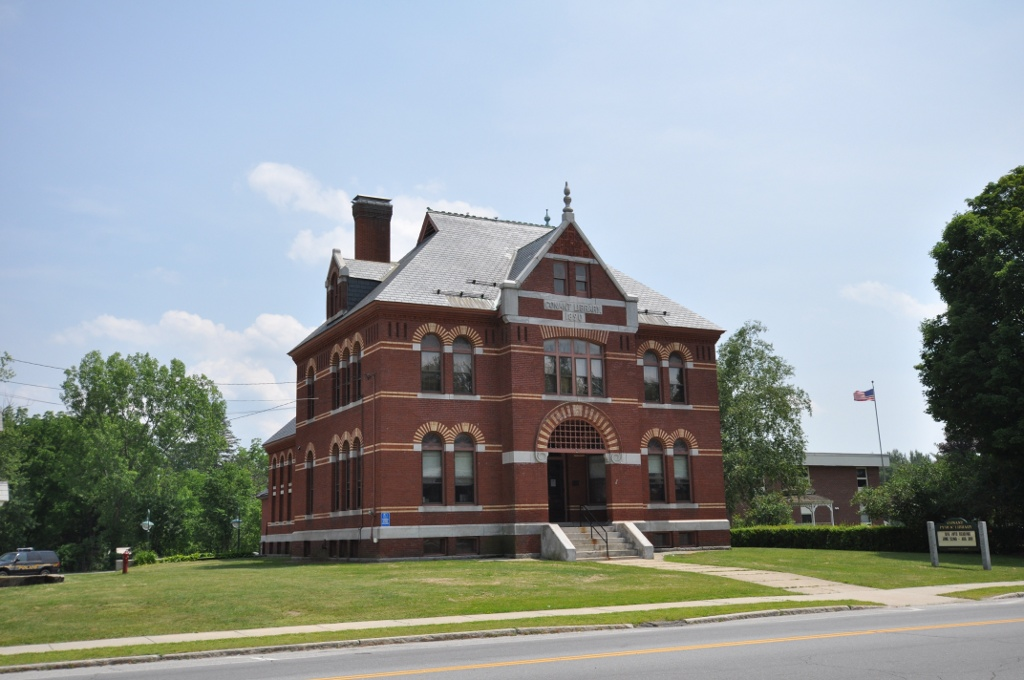

- Location within New Hampshire Location within the United States
- Location: 111 Main St., Winchester, New Hampshire
- Coordinates: 42°46′19″N 72°23′3″W
- Area: 0.3 acres (0.12 ha)
- Built: 1890
- Architect: Currier, J.M.
- Architectural style: Romanesque, Victorian Romanesque Revival
- NRHP reference No.: 87001420
- Added to NRHP: August 27, 1987

The Conant Public Library is the public library of Winchester, New Hampshire. It is located at 111 Main Street, in a fine Victorian Romanesque Revival building erected in 1891, funded by a bequest from Winchester resident Ezra Conant. The building's design, by Springfield, Massachusetts architect, J. M. Currier, is based on his design of the 1886 library building in Brattleboro, Vermont, and is one of the most architecturally distinguished buildings in Cheshire County. It was listed on the National Register of Historic Places in 1987.

== Architecture and history ==
The Conant Public Library stands in the town center of Winchester, just south of town hall on the east side of Main Street. It is a 2-1/2 story masonry structure, built out of red brick with trim of granite and buff brick, and covered by a gable-on-hip roof. The main facade has a centered projecting entry section with a gabled roof, with the entrance deeply recessed under a large rounded arch. The projecting section is flanked by paired round-arch windows, with granite sills and with arches of alternating soldier bricks in buff and red. Similar windows are found on the building sides, and on the rear extensions. Above the main entrance is a band of four sash windows, topped by transom windows that are shaped to form a broad segmental arch.

Winchester's early library was a private circulating collection called the Washington Library Association, which donated its collection to the town in 1876. This collection was first housed in a commercial building on Main Street, which was soon deemed to be inadequate for the purpose. The town received a bequest in 1889 from Ezra Conant, a Winchester native who had made his fortune in the leather business, for $50,000 to cover the cost of a new library building. The terms of the bequest required the construction of a building separate from the town hall, whose construction had been planned to include a library space. The building was largely completed in 1891, but did not formally open until April 1892.

== See also ==
- National Register of Historic Places listings in Cheshire County, New Hampshire
