= Elizabeth Ann Claridge McCune =

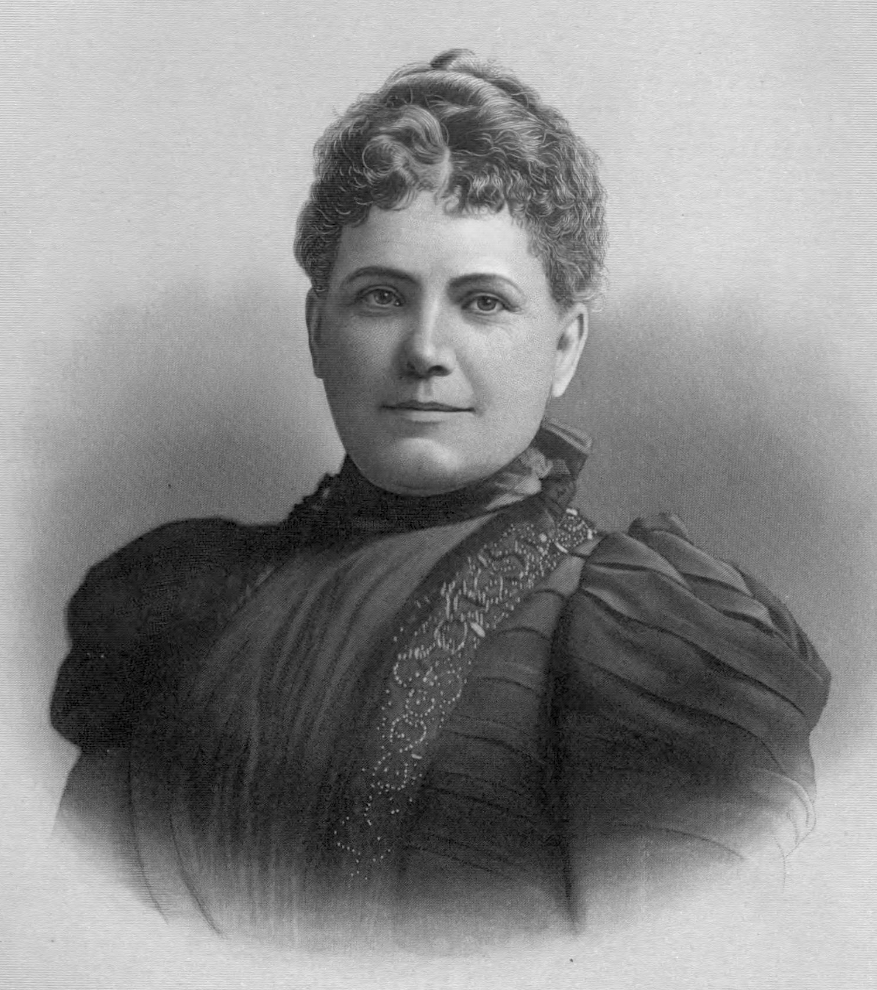
- Born: February 19, 1852; Bedfordshire, England
- Died: January 1, 1924 (aged 71); Salt Lake City, Utah, United States
- Spouse: Alfred W. McCune

Elizabeth Ann Claridge McCune (February 19, 1852 – January 1, 1924) was an unofficial Mormon missionary. Her personal missionary work led to the Church of Jesus Christ of Latter-day Saints (LDS Church) allowing single women to be proselytizing missionaries beginning in 1898. McCune's husband, Alfred W. McCune, was a wealthy Utah politician and businessman and she held several important positions in various organizations in Utah and for the LDS Church.

== Early life and marriage ==
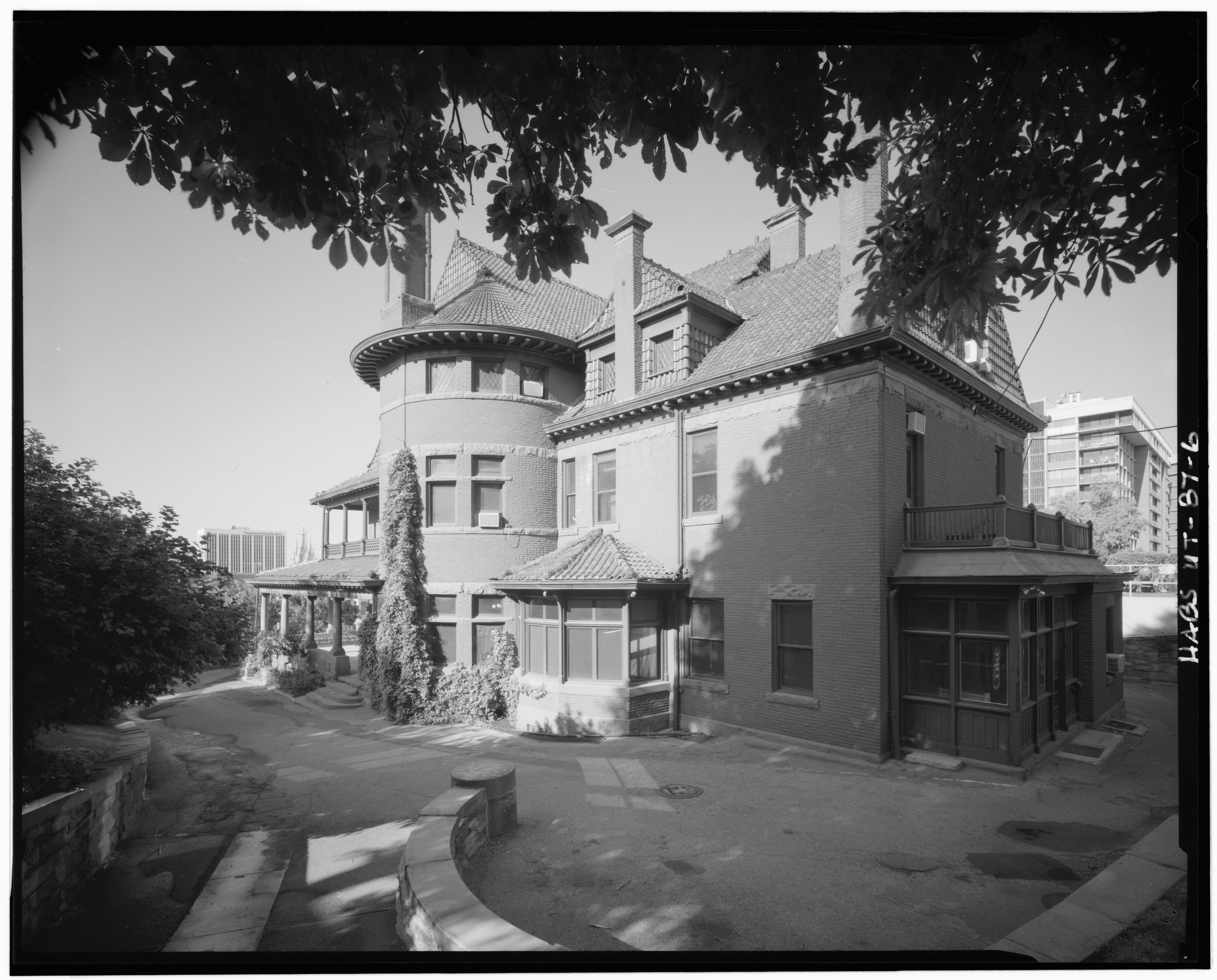
The McCune home in Salt Lake City

McCune was born in Bedfordshire, England on February 19, 1852 to Samuel and Charlotte Joy Claridge. Their family emigrated to the United States with the Ten Pound Company when she was eleven months old. After passing through Iowa, her family moved west to Utah Territory in 1853, where they settled in Salt Creek, later renamed Nephi. Her parents had two other daughters in Nephi, one of which died in infancy and the other, Charlotte Joy Claridge, later married Brigham S. Young. At age fifteen, Elizabeth learned to work as a telegrapher in Mona, Utah, where she also started writing about her own life. When McCune was around seventeen years old, she and her family joined her father missionary efforts in southeast Nevada known as "the Muddy." When they left Nevada, McCune and her family moved to St. George, Utah where she worked at the telegraph office and became a part of the St. George Home Dramatic Troupe where she practiced her dramatic talents.

McCune and her family moved to Long Valley, and on a trip to visit Nephi, saw her childhood sweetheart, Alfred W. McCune. They were married on July 1, 1872 in the Endowment House in Salt Lake City. For some time, the McCunes lived on a small farm near Nephi, but later moved to Salt Lake City. Her husband's work on the railroad netted the family a large amount of money. While her husband worked on various business ventures, McCune stayed active in the community. She was chosen as a ward counselor in 1888. In 1893, she was a temple worker in the Salt Lake Temple.

== Missionary work ==
In February 1897, the McCune family visited Europe and some of Asia. Four of her youngest children went on the trip with her. During the trip, McCune conducted genealogical research and accompanied missionaries to street meetings. Like the missionaries, she wanted to share the gospel in the way that church elders did. At the conference of the Saints in London, Joseph W. McMurrin asked her to talk about her experiences growing up as a Mormon. She described the countryside of Utah and her own travels. She also described relations between genders in Utah:

Our husbands are proud of their wives and daughters; they do not consider that they were created solely to wash dishes and tend babies; but they give them every opportunity to attend meetings and lectures and to take up everything which will educate and develop them. Our religion teaches us that the wife stands shoulder to shoulder with the husband.

After her moving speech given to a large crowd, many Mormons in the group agreed that women were able to reach people's hearts in a way that the elders, who were all men, could not. She was invited to speak at other meetings, especially to help dispel rumors that Mormon women were mistreated in the United States. In 1898, McMurrin, who had seen her speak, requested women missionaries be sent in England. In April 1898, George Q. Cannon, called for women to do more missionary work and Amanda Inez Knight and Lucy Jane Brimhall became the first single proselyting missionaries for the LDS Church that month.

== Civic work ==
In 1898, she and her family returned to Salt Lake City. In 1899, McCune left again for Europe in order to attend the International Congress of Women in London. In 1900, she was on the governing board of the Utah Art Institute as the treasurer. In 1903, she left with her husband and two of her children to do missionary work in Peru for about a year.

McCune was appointed as a trustee to the board of board of the Utah State Agricultural College by William Spry in 1905. She served on that board for ten years, and seven of which she was a vice president. She was also appointed a member of the General Board of the Relief Society in 1911. Working with the Relief Society, she traveled and gave classes in Brooklyn, New York on genealogy.

McCune died in Salt Lake City on January 1, 1924. She is buried in Nephi.
