= Frank Grouard =

Scout and interpreter for General George Crook during the American Indian War

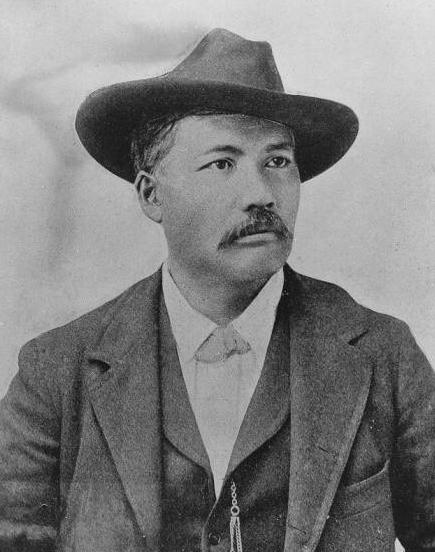
- Frank Grouard in 1876
- Born: September 20, 1850; Anaa-Tuamotu Archipelago
- Died: August 15, 1905 (aged 54); St. Joseph, Missouri, US
- Burial place: Ashland Cemetery, St. Joseph, Missouri, United States
- Spouse: Lizabell "Belle" Ostrander
- Children: Benjamin Franklin Grouard, b. 1896
- Military career
- Allegiance: United States of America
- Branch: United States Army
- Rank: Chief Scout
- Unit: 3rd U.S. Cavalry
- Conflicts: Indian Wars: Big Horn Expedition; Battle of Powder River; Battle of the Rosebud; Little Bighorn Campaign; Battle of the Rosebud; Battle of Slim Buttes; Wounded Knee Massacre

Signature
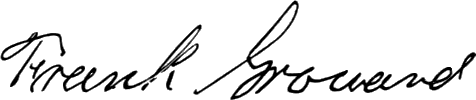

Frank Benjamin Grouard (also known as Frank Gruard, Benjamin Franklin Grouard, and Standing Bear) (September 20, 1850 – August 15, 1905) was a Scout and interpreter for General George Crook during the American Indian War of 1876. Grouard was born in the Tuamoto Islands to a Mormon missionary and his Polynesian wife. While working as a mail carrier in the Montana Territory, he was captured by Crow warriors and later adopted into a Sioux camp. He would live among the Sioux for the better part of a decade before returning to Anglo-American society. Owing to his knowledge of Sioux language and culture, he became a skilled Indian Scout. He was General Crook's lead scout at the Battle of the Rosebud, participated in the Slim Buttes Fight, Battle of Red Fork, helped to assess the immediate aftermath of the Battle of the Little Bighorn, and participated in the Wounded Knee Massacre.

== Early years ==
Grouard was born on the island of Anaa in the Tuamotu Archipelago in the South Pacific Ocean. His mother was a Polynesian woman, and his father, Benjamin Franklin Grouard, was an American missionary for the Mormon Church. Frank was the second of three sons born to the Grouard family.

The family moved to Utah in 1852, and later moved to San Bernardino in Southern California. After a year in California, Benjamin Grouard's wife returned to the South Pacific with two of the children, leaving him with the middle son, Frank. In 1855, Frank was adopted into the family of Addison and Louisa Barnes Pratt, fellow missionaries for the Mormon Church with his father. The Pratt family moved to Beaver, Utah, from where Frank ran away at age 15, going to Helena, Montana and becoming an express rider and stage driver.

== Indian scout ==
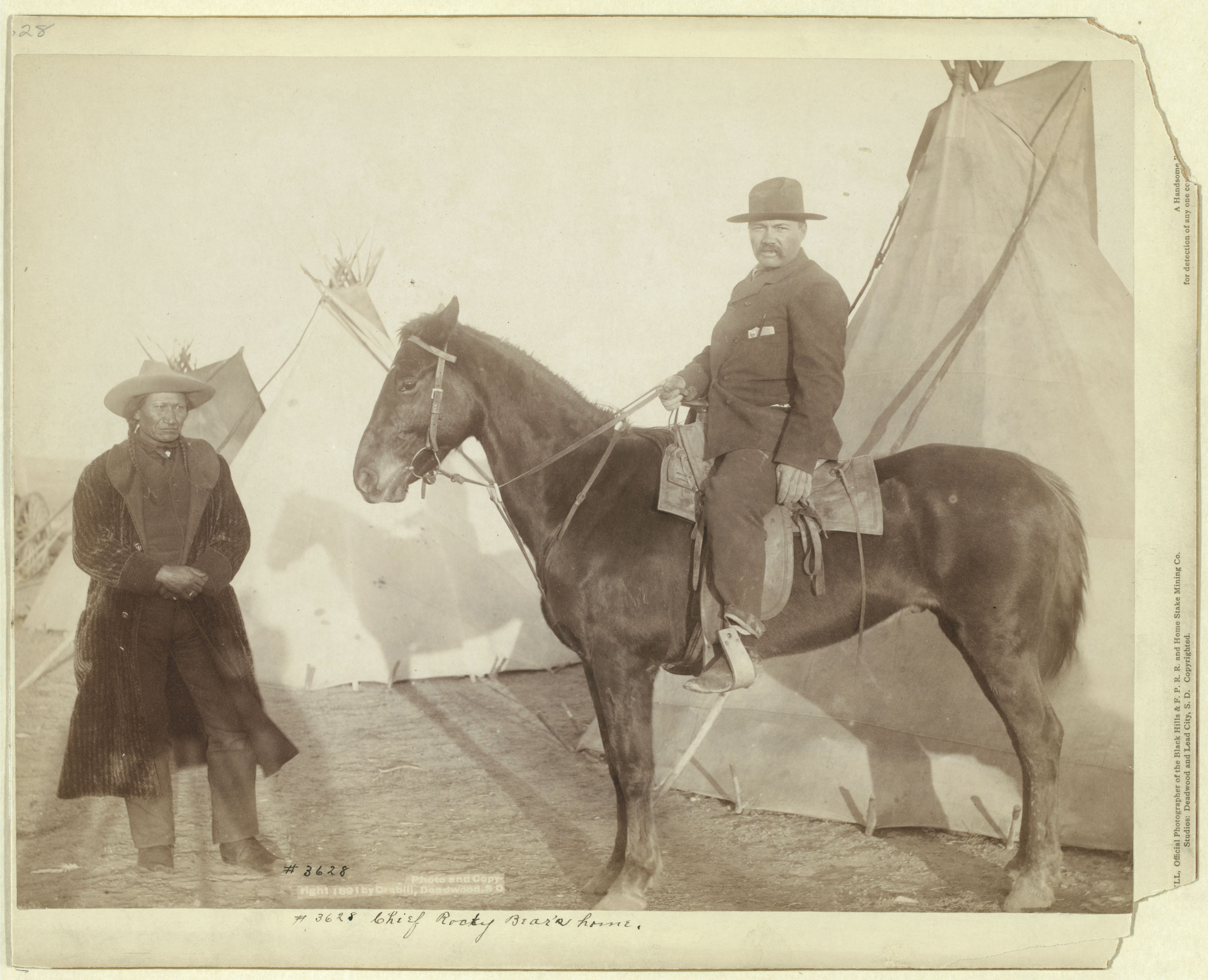
Rocky Bear (left) and Frank Grouard (right)

In about 1869, while working as a mail carrier, Grouard was captured near the mouth of the Milk River in Montana by Crow Indians who took all his possessions and abandoned him in a forest where he was found by Sioux Indians and later adopted as a brother by Chief Sitting Bull. He was probably accepted by them as an Indian because his Polynesian features resembled those of the Sioux.

Grouard married a Sioux woman and learned to speak the Sioux language fluently, taking the Indian names 'Sitting-with-Upraised-Hands' and 'Standing Bear', (Yugata), as he had been captured wearing a bearskin coat. For seven to eight years, he lived in the camps of Sitting Bull and Crazy Horse, until he managed to escape, becoming an emissary of the Indian Peace Commission at Red Cloud Agency in Nebraska.

In 1876, Grouard became a Chief Indian Scout in the United States Army under General George Crook, fighting Sioux Indians. By February 1876, many Indians were leaving the reservations, with some refusing to return when ordered to by the United States government. General Crook began his winter march from Fort Fetterman on March 1, 1876 with many companies of troops, along with Grouard as his chief Indian scout and interpreter.

== Indian Wars ==
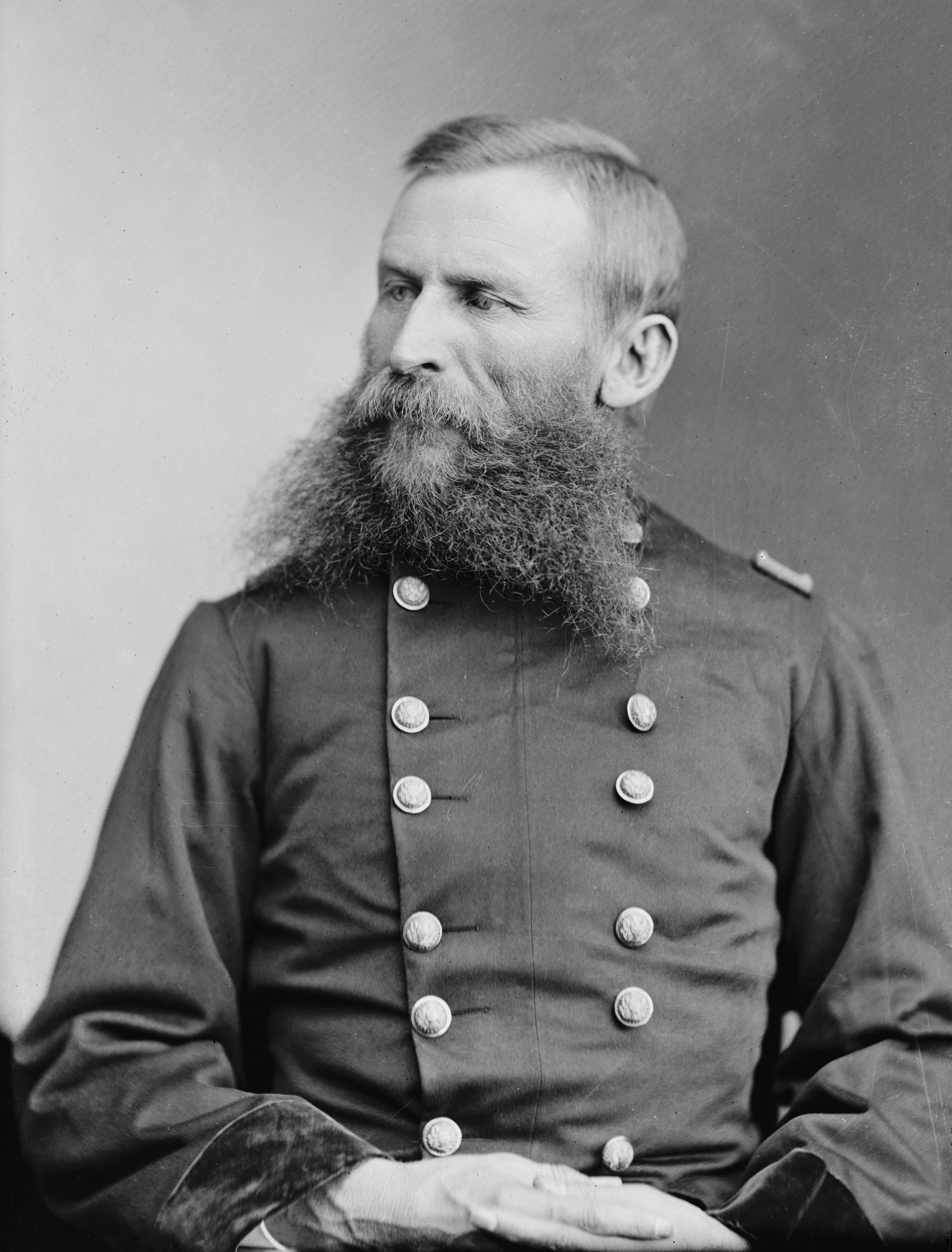
General George Crook

When Sitting Bull heard that Grouard was Crook's Chief Scout, he saw an opportunity to kill him in battle. By March 17, 1876, Grouard had located He Dog's (Lakota) and Old Bear's (Cheyenne) combined village on Powder River in Montana. He followed the trail left by two hostiles, who had been spotted the previous day, all through the night, even when their tracks were covered during a snowstorm. General Crook, in his May 1876 report wrote, "I would sooner lose a third of my command than Frank Grouard!" Other scouts, jealous of Crook's preference for Grouard, tried to turn the General against him by claiming that Grouard had joined up as a scout in order to lead the Army into a carefully orchestrated trap, but Crook saw through all this. On occasions when scouting Grouard would dress as an Indian so that genuine Indians would take no notice of him. Thus, Grouard could pass as an American and an American Indian.

He was a major participant in the Rosebud campaign, and saw action in the Battle of the Rosebud. General George Crook and his officers, having retreated from the Rosebud, were hunting in the foothills of the Bighorns when Grouard, known to the Brulé as 'One-Who-Catches' and to the Hunkpapa as 'Standing Bear', was acting as guide. Between 9 and 10 in the morning of June 25, 1876 Crook's forces were in Goose Creek Valley when Grouard saw the smoke from Indian signal fires in the distance, which indicated that George Armstrong Custer's command was engaged with the enemy, outnumbered, and being badly pressed. The officers present used their field glasses but could make no sense of the smoke signals and laughed at the idea that a half-Indian could have such knowledge of their meaning. To prove that he was right, at noon Grouard mounted his horse and rode towards the signals, reaching the Little Bighorn, a distance of some seventy miles, at 11 pm on June 25. Here he discovered the bodies of the slain before being chased back to Goose Creek by hostiles, bringing the news of Custer's death to Crook.

== Crazy Horse ==
Grouard has been blamed by some as being instrumental in the subsequent death of Crazy Horse. In August 1877, officers at Camp Robinson received word that the Nez Perce of Chief Joseph had broken out of their reservations in Idaho and were fleeing north through Montana toward Canada. When asked by Lieutenant Clark to join the Army against the Nez Perce, Crazy Horse and the Miniconjou leader Touch the Clouds objected, saying that they had promised to remain at peace when they surrendered. According to one version of events, Crazy Horse finally agreed, saying that he would fight "till all the Nez Perce were killed". But his words were apparently misinterpreted, perhaps deliberately, by Grouard, who reported that Crazy Horse had said that he would "go north and fight until not a white man is left". When he was challenged over his interpretation, Grouard left the council. Grouard claimed that he was present when Crazy Horse was killed.

Grouard was also present at the Yellowstone Expeditions and the Battle of Slim Buttes. He was assigned to the Pine Ridge Indian Reservation during the Ghost Dance Uprising and was present at the Wounded Knee Massacre of 1890. Grouard later served as a U.S. Marshal in Fort McKinney, Buffalo, Wyoming and was involved in the Johnson County War of 1892.

== Killing of an outlaw ==
In 1878, Grouard received a message from Montana Sheriff Tom Irvine that two Wyoming men had stolen horses in Yellowstone, and to be on the look out for them. Grouard took off for O'Malley's dance hall, located a couple miles from the fort and noticed a crowd of people around it. He noticed a man by the name of McGloskey, a possible army deserter, riding one of the stolen horses. Both McGloskey and Grouard knew each other well, with McGloskey making "threats a hundred times during the year that he would kill me on sight." With his carbine in one hand, Grouard tried to wave McGloskey to a stop with the other. McGloskey put spurs to his horse and as he rode past Grouard he fired his revolver at him, barely missing people in the crowd. When he got a hundred yards near the end of town, he stopped his horse for another shot, but Grouard shot him off his horse with his carbine. Frank made a quick stop at the wounded outlaw who was being attended to by one of the spectators, saw that he was still alive, then proceeded upon a fourteen mile chase for his partner, who ended up escaping. McGloskey cursed out Grouard until his last breath, stating that he just wanted to live long enough to get one more shot at him; Grouard replied, that "he could have the first shot...He died that night at eight o'clock hurling curses at me with his very last breath.

== Marriage, family and later years ==
By 1893, Frank Grouard had become famous, and his father, Benjamin Franklin Grouard, who hadn't seen his son since 1855, read of the publication of a biography of the scout. Benjamin Grouard then travelled to Sheridan, Wyoming, where he immediately recognized his son despite a forty-year separation. Frank was married in Amazonia, Missouri on April 10, 1895 to Lizabell "Belle" Ostrander (1862-1912). At least one son, possibly two, seem to have been the result of this union, Benjamin Franklin Grouard, also known as Frank B. Grouard Jr., born in St. Joseph, Missouri on May 15, 1896. The marriage seems to have been brief or Frank was mostly absent from his wife and family for public records primarily list his wife and sons as living with the latter's parents. Grouard's son Benjamin F. Grouard was married at St. Joseph, Missouri on November 28, 1912 to Ethel M. Poe. The later fate of him remains unknown.

In 1893 the U.S. Government needed a mail route for the growing population of Wyoming and surrounding area beginning with a route from Sheridan to Hyattville, over the Big Horn Mountains. The worst winter months in that portion of the mountains was February and March, and it was in March that Grouard received his marching orders to find that route. With a volunteer Wyoming man nick-named "Shorty", along with guns, blankets, and rations for five days they started out. Forced to leave their horses at the Big Horn [River?], they took to snowshoes and headed for the divide. Snowed in at 13,000 feet above sea level, they spent three of their eight days there without fire or food. But their mission had been accomplished, they reached Hyattville, and the mail route was accepted and laid out as Grouard had indicated it. However, Frank had suffered permanent eye damage from the snow and frost, and spent the rest of his life "consult[ing] eminent specialists concerning his eyesight." "Shorty had suffered the same, with frozen face, hands and feet."

Frank Grouard died at St. Joseph, Missouri in 1905, and was buried at Ashland Cemetery.

== In fiction ==
Grouard appears in Flashman and the Redskins by George MacDonald Fraser as the illegitimate son of Flashman and Cleonie Grouard, Flashman's mistress and a slave and prostitute. Fraser has Grouard being brought up by Indians after Flashman sells his pregnant mother Cleonie to the Navajo. In the story, the Harvard-educated Grouard rescues Flashman during the Battle of the Little Bighorn while fighting against the American Army as a Sioux.

== On television ==
The actor Bruce Kay, who appeared only five times on screen between 1955 and 1958, played Grouard in the 1958 episode, "The Greatest Scout of All", on the syndicated anthology series Death Valley Days, hosted by Stanley Andrews. Frank Richards (1909-1992) was cast in the same episode as Sitting Bull. In the story line, the half Sioux Grouard is caught in a culture clash but becomes a highly regarded scout for the United States Army, who is dispatched on the toughest of assignments.
