= Jane Grace Alexander =

American banker (1848–1932)

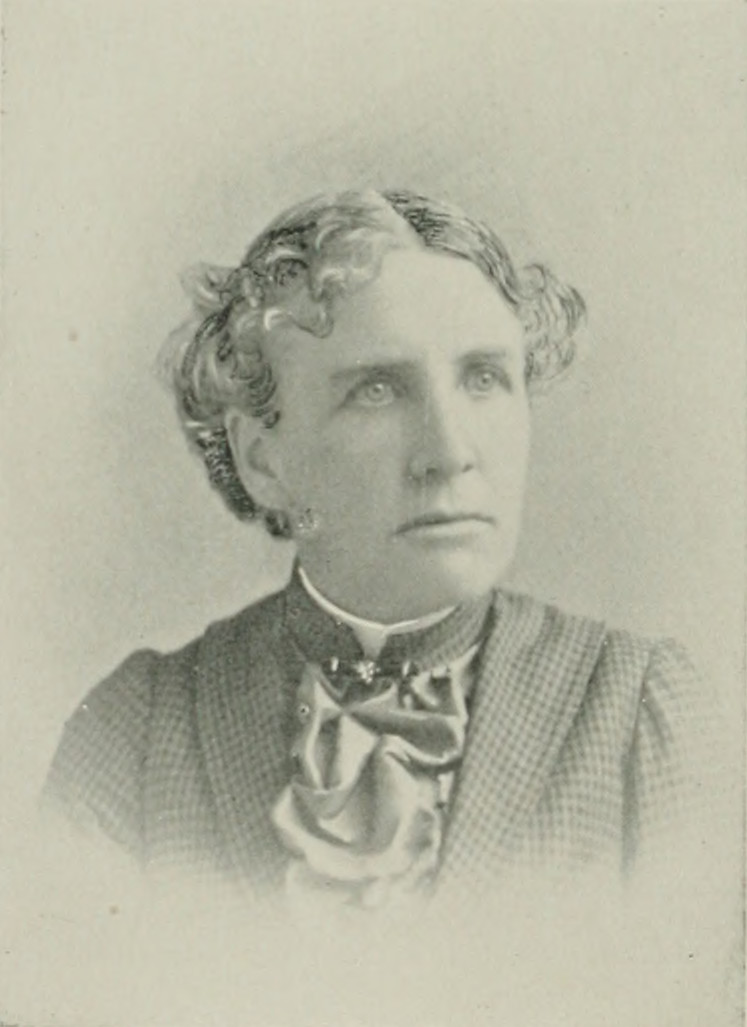
- Portrait photo form A Woman of the Century
- Born: October 26, 1848; Winchester, New Hampshire, U.S.
- Died: March 10, 1932 (aged 83); Warwick, Massachusetts, U.S.
- Occupation: Banker
- Years active: 52 years

Jane Grace Alexander (October 26, 1848 – March 10, 1932) was an American banker, the first woman banker in New Hampshire. Alexander was elected treasurer of the Security Savings Banks in Winchester, New Hampshire. She worked at the city's national bank for 52 years before retiring.

== Biography ==
Jane Grace Alexander was born in Winchester, New Hampshire, October 26, 1848. She was a daughter of Edward and Lucy Capron Alexander, of Puritan ancestry. She was a direct descendent, in the fourth generation, of Reuben Alexander, who was a captain in Colonel Ashley's regiment, which marched to Ticonderoga in October 1776.

Alexander was educated in the Winchester schools, and finished her course in Glenwood Seminary, Brattleboro, Vermont.

After graduating, she taught school for a time.

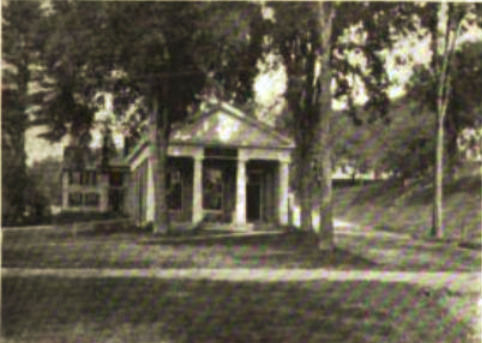
Winchester National Bank (1896)

Early in life she commenced keeping books in her father's office and, later on, was active in the management of his business. She entered the Winchester National Bank as general assistant, in 1871, but soon after assumed the duties of assistant cashier; she retired after 52 years. So fully did she win the confidence of the people, that in 1881, she was elected treasurer of the Security Savings Bank of Winchester. She was the first woman in New Hampshire to fill such a position.

Alexander was president of a Chautauqua class. She was a member of the Universalist church and was superintendent of the Sunday-school fifteen years. She was also treasurer of the school district, trustee of the public library, and first Worthy Matron of Electra chapter, No. 19, Order of the Eastern Star.

Her home was one of the landmarks of Winchester, a large white manor house, in the colonial style, set back from the street, and noticeable for its antiquities, its maples, and its deep lawn. Alexander was devoted to the interests of her home and did much to preserve the homestead. She drove her own horses and indulged in a flower garden.

Jane Grace Alexander died in Warwick, Massachusetts, March 10, 1932.
