= Winchester Town Hall (New Hampshire) =

- U.S. National Register of Historic Places
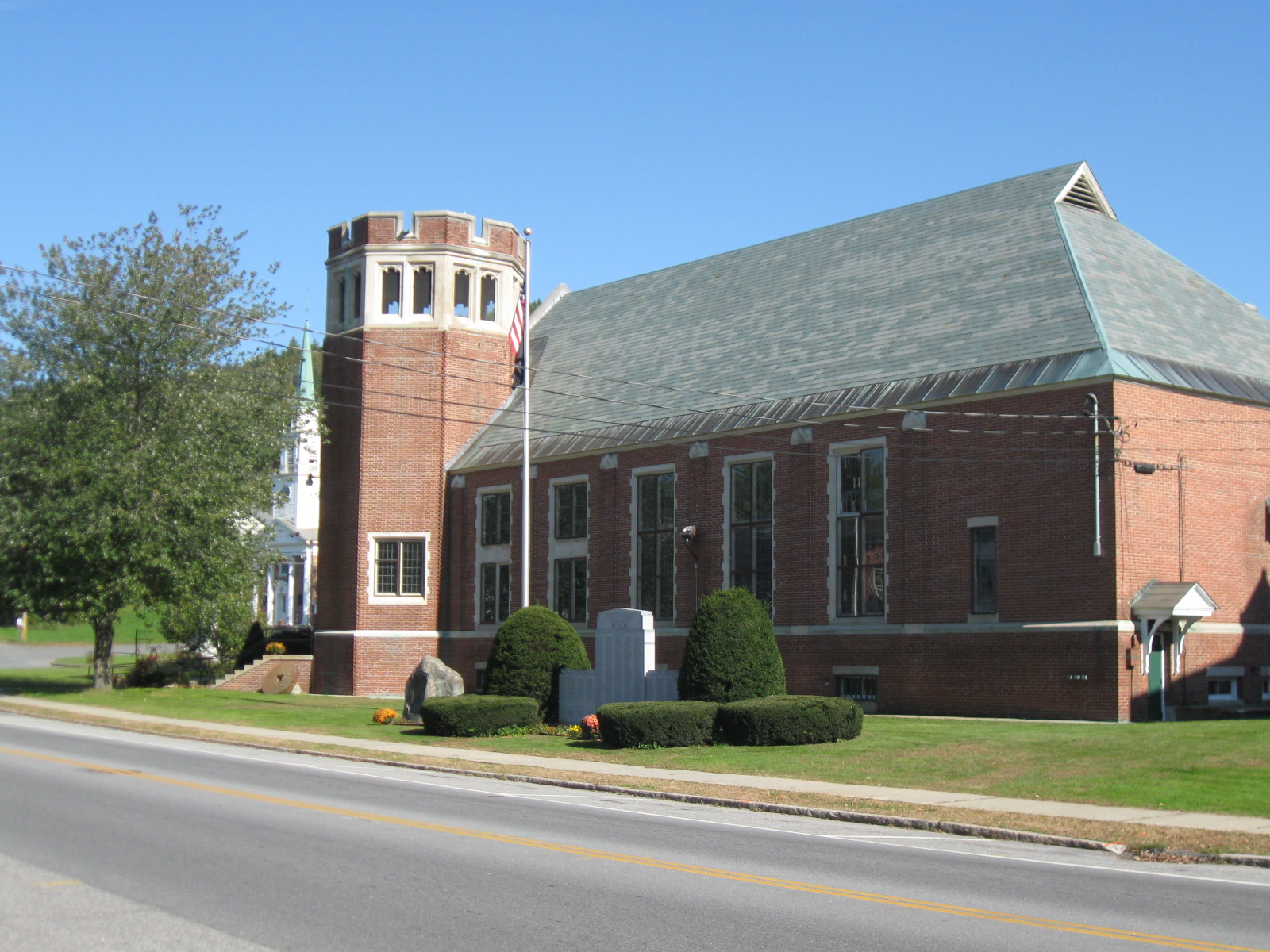

- Location within New Hampshire Location within the United States
- Location: Main St., Winchester, New Hampshire
- Coordinates: 42°46′22″N 72°23′2″W
- Area: 0.4 acres (0.16 ha)
- Built: 1911
- Architect: St. Clair, S. Winthrop
- Architectural style: Late Gothic Revival
- NRHP reference No.: 87001419
- Added to NRHP: August 27, 1987

The town hall of Winchester, New Hampshire, is located on Main Street, just south of the junction of New Hampshire Route 10 and New Hampshire Route 119 in the center of the town.

== History and building details ==
Built of brick in 1911–12 to a design by S. Winthrop St. Clair, it is the only Gothic Revival town hall in Cheshire County. It was built because the previous town meeting house (a combination town hall and church at the site of the Winchester Memorial Church) was destroyed by fire. The church was also designed by St. Clair, a Boston-based architect who hailed from Winchester.

The town hall is a roughly rectangular structure, covered by a roof that is gabled at one end and hipped below a very small gable at the other end. At the northern corner stands an octagonal four-story tower topped by a crenellated parapet. The interior of the building has two levels: the upper-level houses an auditorium space with a stage at one end, with a balcony area that has been converted for use as offices. The basement level houses additional offices. The building has seen alterations primarily to its interior, but has retained much of its original design.

The building was listed on the National Register of Historic Places in 1987.

== See also ==
- National Register of Historic Places listings in Cheshire County, New Hampshire
