= Winchester Memorial Church =

- New Hampshire Conservatory of Music and the Arts
- U.S. National Register of Historic Places
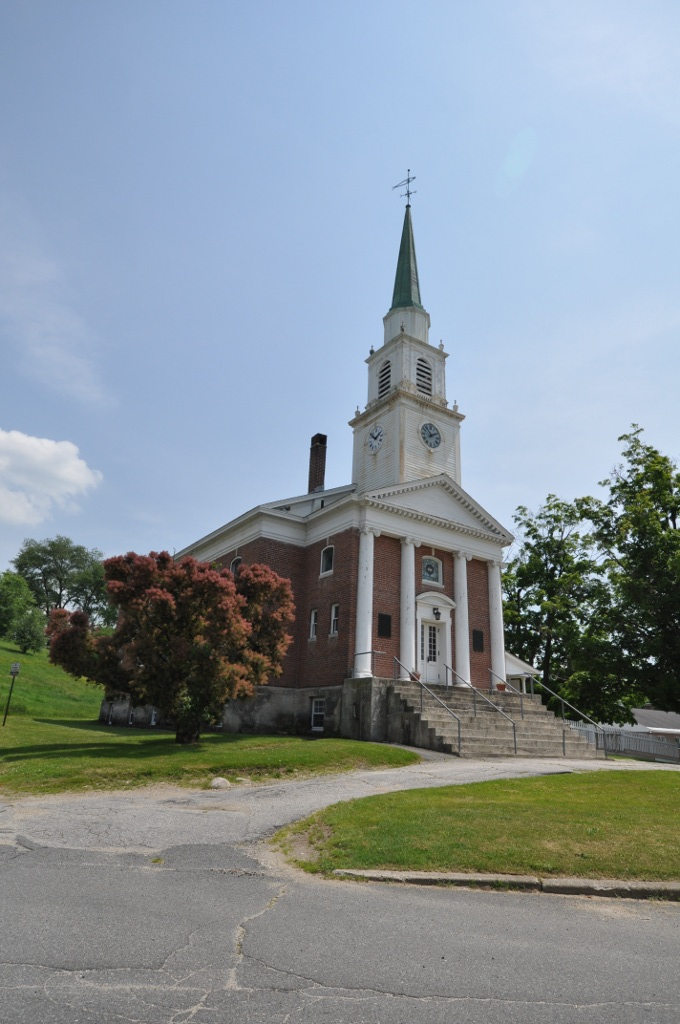

- Location within New Hampshire Location within the United States
- Location: Central Sq., Winchester, New Hampshire
- Coordinates: 42°46′24″N 72°22′59″W
- Area: 0.7 acres (0.28 ha)
- Built: 1912
- Architect: St. Clair, S. Winthrop
- Architectural style: Colonial Revival
- NRHP reference No.: 80000276
- Added to NRHP: May 15, 1980

The Winchester Memorial Church, also known as the New Hampshire Conservatory of Music and the Arts, is a historic civic building in the center of Winchester, New Hampshire, United States. Built in 1912, it is a prominent local example of Colonial Revival architecture. It replaced a meeting house that was the location of the Winchester Profession, a key development in the history of Unitarian Universalism. The building was listed on the National Register of Historic Places in 1980. It was acquired in 2006 by the Universalist Heritage Foundation as a memorial to the site's role in Universalist history.

== Description and history ==
The Winchester Memorial Church is located in the town's village center, sited prominently on a rise at the junction of Michigan and Richmond streets. It is a tall single-story red brick building, with a gabled roof and well-proportioned Colonial Revival styling. It has a projecting gabled entry pavilion, fronted by four pilasters supporting a modillioned pediment. A tower rises above the pavilion, with square clock and bell stages topped by an octagonal stage and steeple. The interior has a large auditorium with a balcony across the rear. Under the balcony are offices and meeting rooms. A number of its windows are stained glass, designed by the George W. Wise Co. of Boston.

The building was designed by S. Winthrop St. Clair and built in 1912 to replace a meeting house (combination town hall and church) that was destroyed by fire. The meeting house it replaced was the location of the Winchester Profession, a key development in the history of Unitarian Universalism, and it was purchased in 2006 by the Universalist Heritage Foundation as a memorial to that history.

== See also ==
- National Register of Historic Places listings in Cheshire County, New Hampshire
