= Papeete Tahiti Temple =

LDS Church temple in Papeete, Tahiti

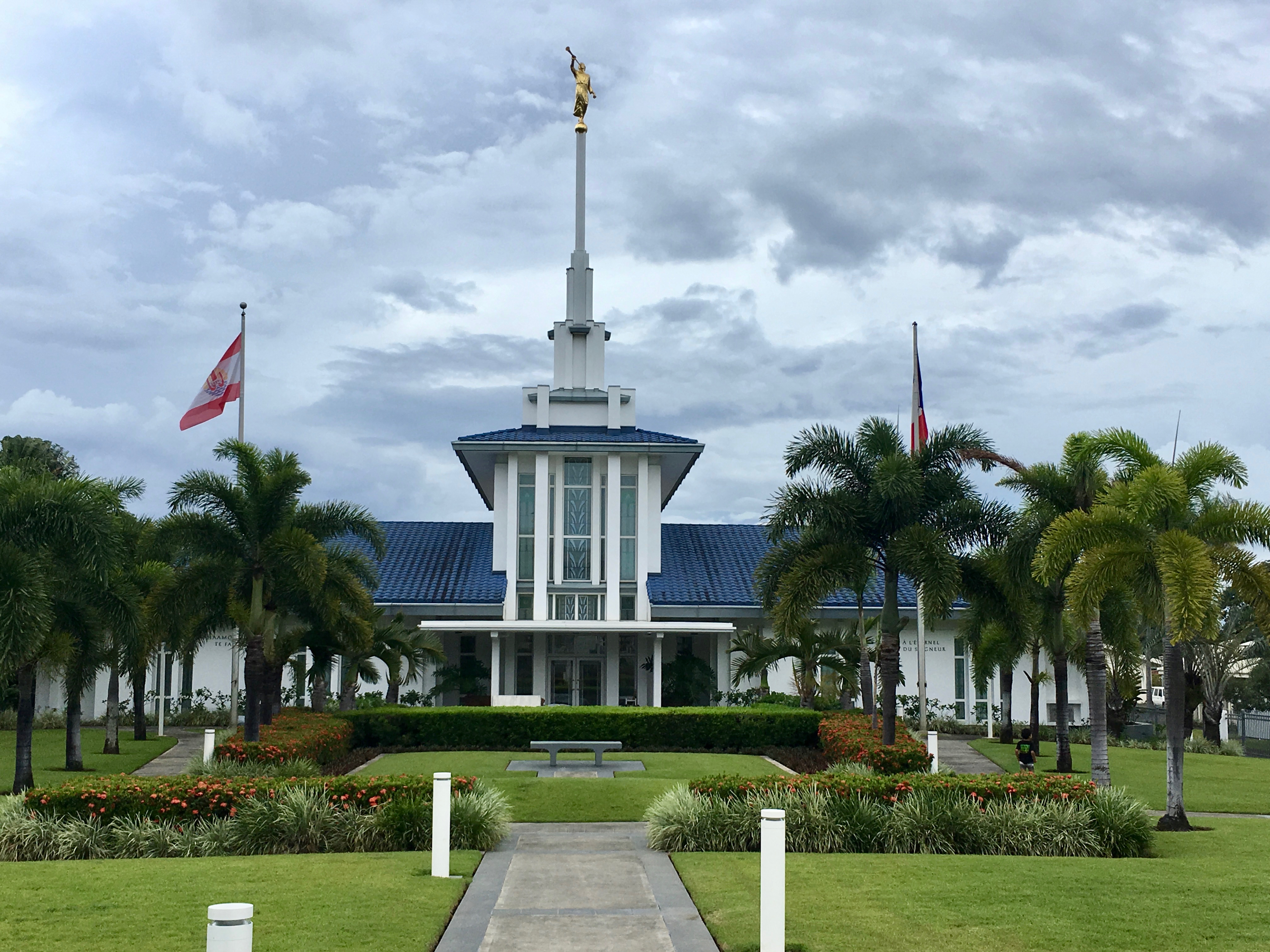
- Interactive map of Papeete Tahiti Temple
- Number: 25
- Dedication: 27 October 1983, by Gordon B. Hinckley
- Site: 1.7 acres (0.69 ha)
- Floor area: 12,150 ft^{2} (1,129 m^{2})
- Height: 66 ft (20 m)
- Official website • News & images

Church chronology
← Santiago Chile Temple	Papeete Tahiti Temple	→ Mexico City Mexico Temple

Additional information
- Announced: 2 April 1980, by Spencer W. Kimball
- Groundbreaking: 13 February 1981, by Spencer W. Kimball
- Open house: 13–22 October 1983; 14 October–4 November 2006
- Rededicated: 12 November 2006, by L. Tom Perry
- Current president: Benjamin T. Sinjoux
- Designed by: Emil B. Fetzer
- Location: Papeete, Tahiti, French Polynesia
- Coordinates: 17°32′12″S 149°33′22″W
- Exterior finish: Painted plaster over stucco
- Design: Modern, single-spire design with influences of French and Polynesian cultures
- Baptistries: 1
- Ordinance rooms: 2 (stationary)
- Sealing rooms: 2

The Papeete Tahiti Temple is a temple of the Church of Jesus Christ of Latter-day Saints in Papeete, Tahiti, French Polynesia. The intent to build the temple was announced on April 2, 1980, by church president Spencer W. Kimball during general conference. It is the church's first temple in Tahiti, and has a modern, single-spire design with French and Polynesian architectural influences, created by church architect Emil B. Fetzer.

A groundbreaking ceremony was held on February 13, 1981, presided over by Kimball. The temple was originally completed and dedicated by Gordon B. Hinckley in October 1983. It later underwent a major renovation from 2005 to 2006 that expanded its floor area and added new rooms before its rededication by L. Tom Perry of the Quorum of the Twelve Apostles. The temple grounds have hosted cultural events, including a large 2006 celebration attended by around 10,000 participants from multiple islands.

== History ==
The temple was announced by church president Spencer W. Kimball on April 2, 1980. The following six were announced at the same general conference: Buenos Aires, Argentina; Santiago, Chile; Nuku‘alofa, Tonga; Apia, Samoa; Sydney, Australia; and Atlanta, Georgia.

The groundbreaking ceremony took place on February 13, 1981, presided over by Kimball and attended by approximately 3,000 church members. After construction was completed, a public open house was held from October 13 to October 22, 1983, attended by about 16,500 visitors.

The dedication took place in six sessions from October 27 to October 29, 1983, with Gordon B. Hinckley, second counselor in the First Presidency, officiating. About 2,500 chrurch members people attended these sessions. Originally built on a 1.7-acre site, the temple had two ordinance rooms and two sealing rooms, totaling 9,936 square feet, using a single-spire design by Emil B. Fetzer.

The temple closed in August 2005 for renovations. After renovations were completed, a public house from October 12 to November 4, 2006 was attended by approximately 36,860 visitors. It was rededicated in two session on November 12, 2006, by apostle L. Tom Perry, with about 10,000 church members participating in person or via broadcast. The rededication was preceded by a cultural celebration of traditional Tahitian dances, a procession of returned missionaries carrying flags of their countries of service, and a choir performance.

In 2009, the church purchased adjacent land to expand the grounds, adding parking, gardens, and a straightened access road, which allowed the temple to be seen from the street more easily.

== Design and architecture ==
The temple’s design has a single-spire, with architecture that blends European (French) and Polynesian design elements. The original design was by Emil B. Fetzer, with the local base building by Pierre Jean Picart Architects D.P.I.G., and renovation updates by Naylor Wentworth Lund Architects.

It is on a 1.7-acre plot—5 acres including the adjacent meetinghouse—the temple grounds have tropical gardens and palm trees.

The exterior uses stucco mixed with imported white sand, with a blue tile roof and a 66-foot spire with a gilded angel Moroni statue. Stained-glass windows are used for the façade, with carbuncle added by Holman Studios in the stained glass. Tom Holdman (owner of Holdman Studios) saw the carbuncle as reminiscent of a prophecy from Isaiah about temples in the Book of Mormon: “And I will make thy windows of agates, and thy gates of carbuncles, and all thy borders of pleasant stones”.

The interior originally had two ordinance rooms, two sealing rooms, and a baptistry. The 2005–2006 renovation expanded the total floor area to 12,150 square feet, enlarged the baptistry, added a sealing room, and added a bride’s room, waiting area, and office space. The renovated temple was reopened for public tours from October 12 to November 4, 2006, and rededicated November 12, 2006 by L. Tom Perry.

== Cultural and community impact ==
During the 2006 rededication, a cultural celebration attended by around 10,000 Latter-day Saints from Tahiti, the Cook Islands, and returned missionaries showcased traditional dances, flag processions, and a choir performance.

Since its dedication in 1983, the Papeete Tahiti Temple has been credited by local leaders with strengthening families, increasing temple marriages, and influencing cultural practices among Latter-day Saints in French Polynesia. A family history center on the temple grounds is as a resource for the region, preserving civil records and providing access to more than 1,400 rolls of genealogical microfilm, where many residents have come to prove heirship to properties and to trace their family trees.

== Temple presidents and admittance ==
The church's temples are directed by a temple president and matron, each typically serving for a term of three years. The president and matron oversee the administration of temple operations and provide guidance and training for both temple patrons and staff.

Serving from 1983 to 1987, Joseph E. Childers was the first president, with Doris T. Childers serving as matron. As of 2024, the temple’s president and matron are Benjamin T. Sinjoux and Christine Sinjoux.

A public open house for the temple was held October 14–November 4, 2006 (excluding Sundays). The temple was dedicated by Gordon B. Hinckley on October 27–29, 1983, in six sessions. Like all the church's temples, it is not used for Sunday worship services. To members of the church, temples are regarded as sacred houses of the Lord. Once dedicated, only church members with a current temple recommend can enter for worship.

== See also ==
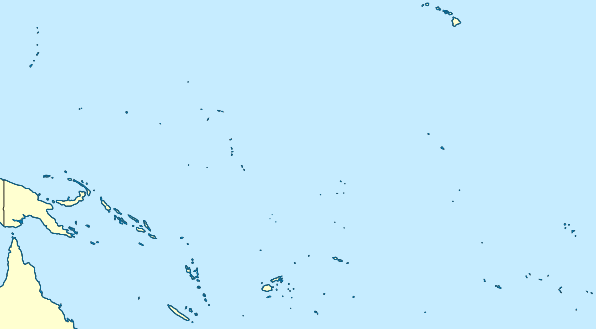
Temples in the Pacific Islands
- = Operating
- = Under construction
- = Announced
- = Temporarily Closed
- Comparison of temples of The Church of Jesus Christ of Latter-day Saints
- List of temples of The Church of Jesus Christ of Latter-day Saints
- List of temples of The Church of Jesus Christ of Latter-day Saints by geographic region
- Temple architecture (Latter-day Saints)
- The Church of Jesus Christ of Latter-day Saints in French Polynesia
