= Samuel Claridge =

Mormon leader (1828–1919)

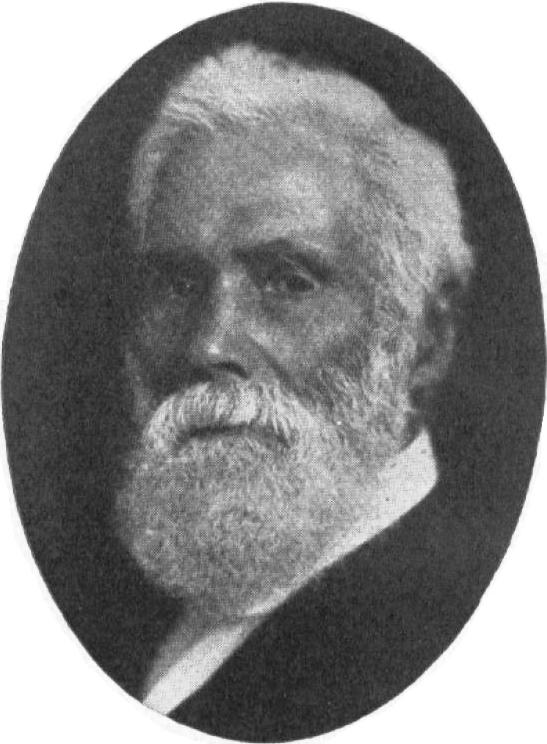

Personal details
- Born: December 5, 1828; Leighton Buzzard, Bedfordshire, England
- Died: September 11, 1919 (aged 90); Thatcher, Arizona, United States
- Resting place: Thatcher Cemetery; 32°49′59″N 109°45′43″W
- Spouse(s): Charlotte Joy; Rebecca Hughes
- Children: 15, including David
- Parents: David Claridge; Elizabeth P. Hopkins

Samuel Claridge (December 5, 1828 – September 11, 1919) was a member of the Church of Jesus Christ of Latter-day Saints (LDS Church) who was a prominent early settler of the Muddy River Valley in Nevada and Thatcher, Arizona.

Claridge was born in Leighton Buzzard, Bedfordshire, England, to David Claridge and Elizabeth Pratt Hopkins. In 1849, he married Charlotte Joy and in 1851 they joined the LDS Church. In 1853, they emigrated to Utah Territory, settling in Nephi. In 1868, Wilford Woodruff appointed Claridge to preside over the Latter-day Saints living along the Muddy River in Nevada (then in Utah Territory). The eastern border of Nevada was later shifted east, and with the attempt to charge back taxes to those living there, the Latter-day Saints moved away. Claridge moved to Kane County, Utah.

In 1875, Claridge was one of the founders of Orderville, Utah. He left his wife and children there in 1877 to serve a church mission in Britain. After his mission, Claridge lived in Orderville until he moved to Thatcher, Arizona, in 1883. He served as the bishop of the Thatcher Ward and later as the first patriarch of the St. Joseph Stake, which was headquartered at Thatcher. Among those who received patriarchal blessings from him was Spencer W. Kimball.

Claridge's daughter, Elizabeth (1852–1924), was the wife of Alfred William McCune, Sr. (1849–1927) and a prominent benefactor of the operations of the LDS Church in the 1920s.

S. George Ellsworth, a grandson of Claridge, wrote a biography of Claridge titled Samuel Claridge: Pioneering the Outposts of Zion. Claridge's daughter, Charlotte "Lottie", married Brigham Young III, a son of Brigham Young, Jr. and his wife Catherine Curtis Spencer. One of Claridge's sons, David H. Claridge, was a member of the Arizona House of Representatives.
