= Elizabeth Dore =

Professor of Latin American studies (1946–2022)

- Portrait of Dore
- Born: 1946
- Died: 2022 (aged 75–76)
- Occupation: Professor

Elizabeth Dore (1946-2022) was a professor of Latin American studies, specialising in class, race, gender and ethnicity, with a focus on modern history. She was professor emerita of Modern Languages and Linguistics at the University of Southampton, and had a PhD from Columbia University.

She was Project Director of the Oral History Project 'Memories of the Cuban Revolution' and wrote extensively on Cuban history and politics.

== Selected publications ==
- The Peruvian Mining Industry: Growth, Stagnation, And Crisis (Westview, 1988; Routledge, 2019)
- Gender Politics in Latin America: Debates in Theory and Practice (Edited, Monthly Review Press, 1997)
- Hidden Histories of Gender and the State in Latin America (Edited with Maxine Molyneux, Duke University Press, 2000)
- Myths of modernity: Peonage and Patriarchy in Nicaragua (Duke University Press, 2006)
- Cuban Lives: What Difference Did a Revolution Make? (Verso, 2017)
- How Things Fall Apart: What Happened to the Cuban Revolution (Apollo, 2022)
