= Louisa Barnes Pratt =

American LDS Church missionary (1802–1880)

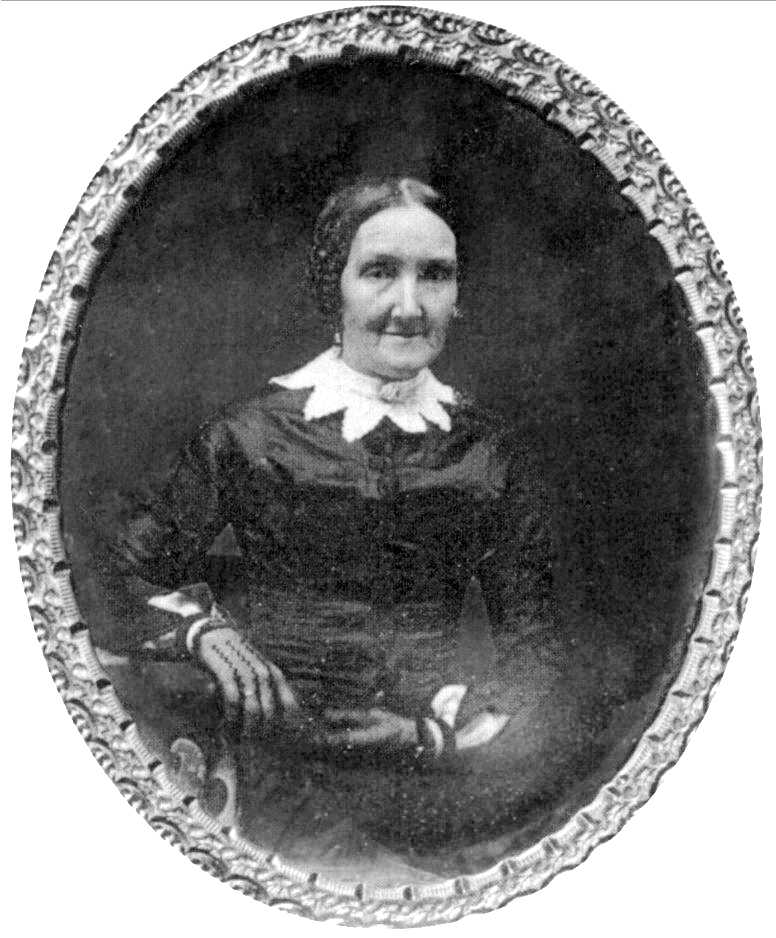
- Born: November 10, 1802; Warwick, Massachusetts
- Died: September 8, 1880 (aged 77); Beaver, Utah
- Spouse: Addison Pratt

Louisa Barnes Pratt (November 10, 1802 – September 8, 1880) was a prominent advocate for women's vote and other related causes in the 19th century as well as a Latter-day Saint missionary.

== Early life ==
Louisa Barnes was born in Warwick, Massachusetts, on November 10, 1802, to Willard and Dolly Barnes. Her father served in the British forces during the War of 1812 although in her autobiography she alleged he was a supporter of the United States. She attended school, although found it hard to be obedient. She was sent to live with an aunt near her home when she was about 5 years of age. She and her family moved to Quebec, Canada in July 1810. Her family were members of the Church of England, and Louisa was baptized into the Episcopal Church when she was 14. Not long after her baptism, Louisa went to live with a sister-in-law who taught her to tailor.

Louisa traveled back to Massachusetts in her early twenties and visited many of her family members. After leaving Massachusetts in 1827, Louisa enrolled in the Female Academy, where she met and befriended Rebekah J. Pratt. This eventually led to her meeting Rebekah's brother Addison, who enjoyed sailing. Louisa became a teacher in Winchester, New Hampshire. After being in Massachusetts and New Hampshire for four years Louisa returned to Canada. After she had been in Canada for a year and a half Addison came to visit. They married on April 3, 1831, in Canada. Shortly after their marriage they moved to Ripley, New York, near Lake Erie. The couple went on to have seven children born there.

== Conversion ==
Pratt joined what was then called the Church of Jesus Christ of Latter Day Saints along with her husband Addison Pratt in 1838. They were introduced to the church by her sister Caroline Crosby and her husband Jonathan Crosby who stopped by their home in western New York on their way to Kirtland, Ohio, to gather with the body of the Latter-day Saints. Pratt and her family were persecuted for joining the church, and eventually moved to Nauvoo, Illinois.

In 1843, Addison left to serve a mission in Polynesia (originally intending to go to Hawaii but actually ending up in Tahiti). Louisa stayed behind at Nauvoo to care for their four children. It was there that she heard the news of the prophet Joseph Smith's death in 1844. Alone, Louisa started a school, trained her horse, offered tailoring services, and took care of her family until she traveled westward to Salt Lake City with her children in 1846. On her journey, she passed through Winter Quarters. She traveled in Brigham Young's company in 1848 across the plains. She reunited with Addison eight days after her arrival in the Salt Lake Valley in 1848. They had been apart five and a half years, during which time she overcame cholera, malaria, scurvy, and her children's bout with small pox, provided for them and led them from Nauvoo to the Salt Lake Valley.

== Missionary ==
Pratt was set apart as a missionary to serve in French Polynesia with her husband in 1849. Their daughters accompanied them on their mission. The family arrived in Tubuai in 1850. While in Tahiti, Pratt told a congregation that the Tahitians were descended from the Nephites. This is the first recorded statement to this effect, related to theories about Hagoth's journey recorded in the Book of Alma. They were forced to end their mission due to French laws prohibiting foreign missionaries. The Pratts returned to the United States and moved to San Francisco and then to San Bernardino, California.

== Later years ==
Pratt's husband, Addison, was called on two more missions to Tahiti in 1854 and in 1856. However, due to the law restrictions, he did not remain there long. The Saints in San Bernardino were asked to return to Utah by Brigham Young. Addison refused to leave and stayed in California, but Louisa and two of her children moved to Beaver, Utah. There she contributed to the Women's Exponent. Her husband died on October 14, 1872, while they were separated. Louisa caught pneumonia and died in Beaver on September 8, 1880.

Throughout her life, Pratt kept a detailed journal of her life. Her autobiography was published in a version edited by S. George Ellsworth by Utah State University Press.
