= Winchester, New Hampshire =

- Town
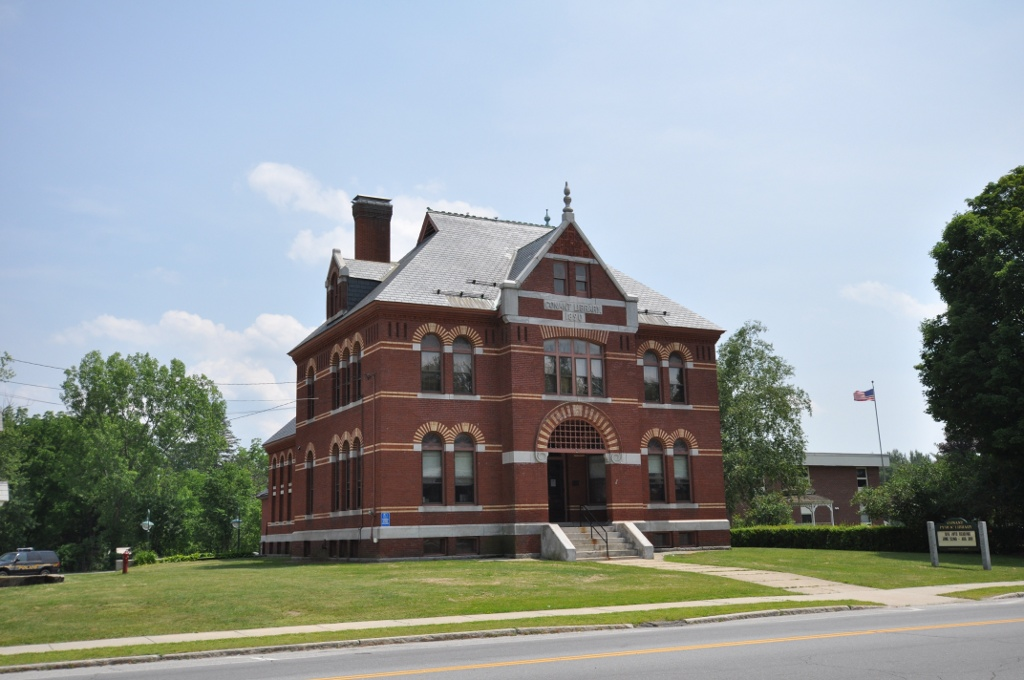
- Conant Public Library

- Seal

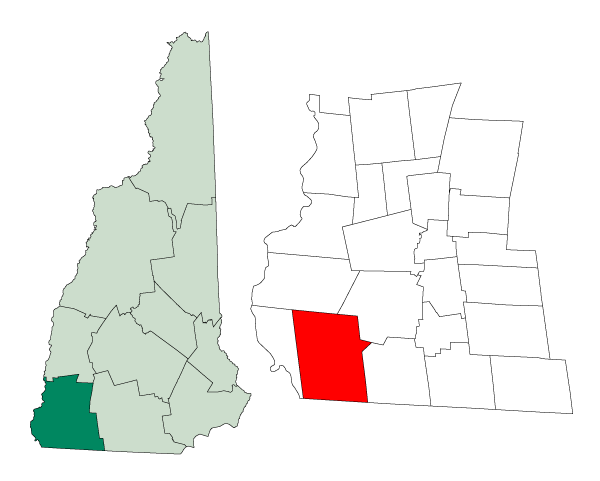
- Location in Cheshire County, New Hampshire
- Coordinates: 42°46′14″N 72°22′59″W
- Country: United States
- State: New Hampshire
- County: Cheshire
- Incorporated: 1753
- Villages: Winchester; Ashuelot; Scotland

Area
  - Total: 55.6 sq mi (143.9 km^{2})
  - Land: 55.0 sq mi (142.4 km^{2})
  - Water: 0.58 sq mi (1.5 km^{2}) 1.01%
- Elevation: 646 ft (197 m)

Population (2020)
  - Total: 4,150
  - Density: 75/sq mi (29.1/km^{2})
- Time zone: UTC-5 (Eastern)
  - Summer (DST): UTC-4 (Eastern)
- ZIP codes: 03470 (Winchester); 03441 (Ashuelot)
- Area code: 603
- FIPS code: 33-85540
- GNIS feature ID: 873757
- Website: www.winchester-nh.gov

Winchester is a town in Cheshire County, New Hampshire, United States. The population was 4,150 at the 2020 census, and an estimated 4,281 in 2025. The primary community in the town, where 1,606 people resided at the 2020 census, is defined by the U.S. Census Bureau as the Winchester census-designated place (CDP). The town also includes the village of Ashuelot and part of Pisgah State Park.

== History ==
Originally named "Arlington" in honor of Charles Fitzroy, Earl of Arlington, this town was one of those established in 1733 by colonial Governor Jonathan Belcher as protection for the Massachusetts Bay Colony border at the Connecticut River. This was in the area encompassed in the relatively newly acquired Equivalent Lands. After being designated a part of the Province of New Hampshire in 1741, the town was granted to Colonel Josiah Willard, commander of the Fort Dummer outpost. In 1753, it was incorporated by Governor Benning Wentworth as "Winchester", for Charles Paulet, 3rd Duke of Bolton, 8th Marquess of Winchester, and constable of the Tower of London.

Pioneers who came to the town as early as 1732 were attacked many times by Indigenous peoples. Several settlers were taken captive, and the town was burned in 1745. Its church, founded in 1736, is the oldest religious body in Cheshire County. The town has two covered bridges.

The Winchester Profession, an influential statement of the principles of Universalism, was adopted at a Universalist congress in Winchester in 1803.

Although it has been an agricultural town, many small industries have been established in Winchester. In the 1830s, Graves & Company was among the nation's first manufacturers of musical instruments. The coming of the Ashuelot Railroad in 1850 fostered the growth of textile mills and wooden-ware factories, especially box manufacture and leather tanning.

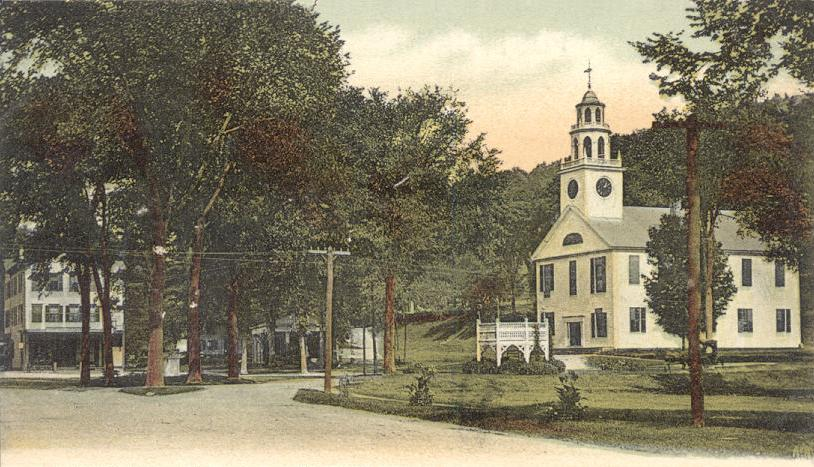
The Common c. 1905

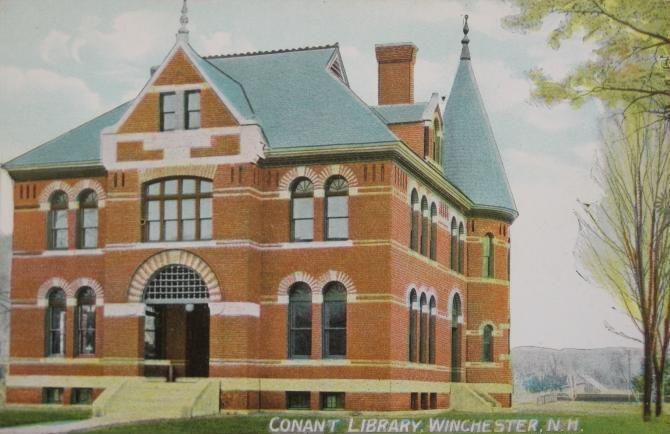
Conant Library in 1909

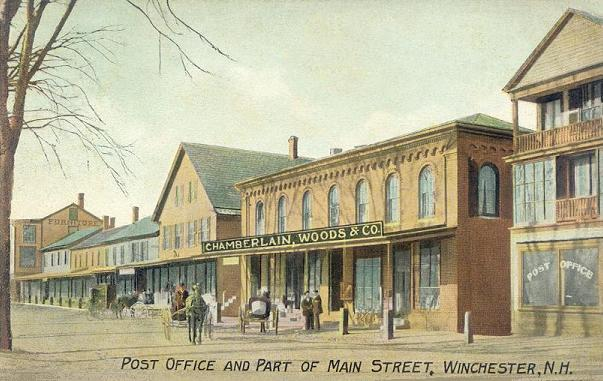
Postcard of town, 1909

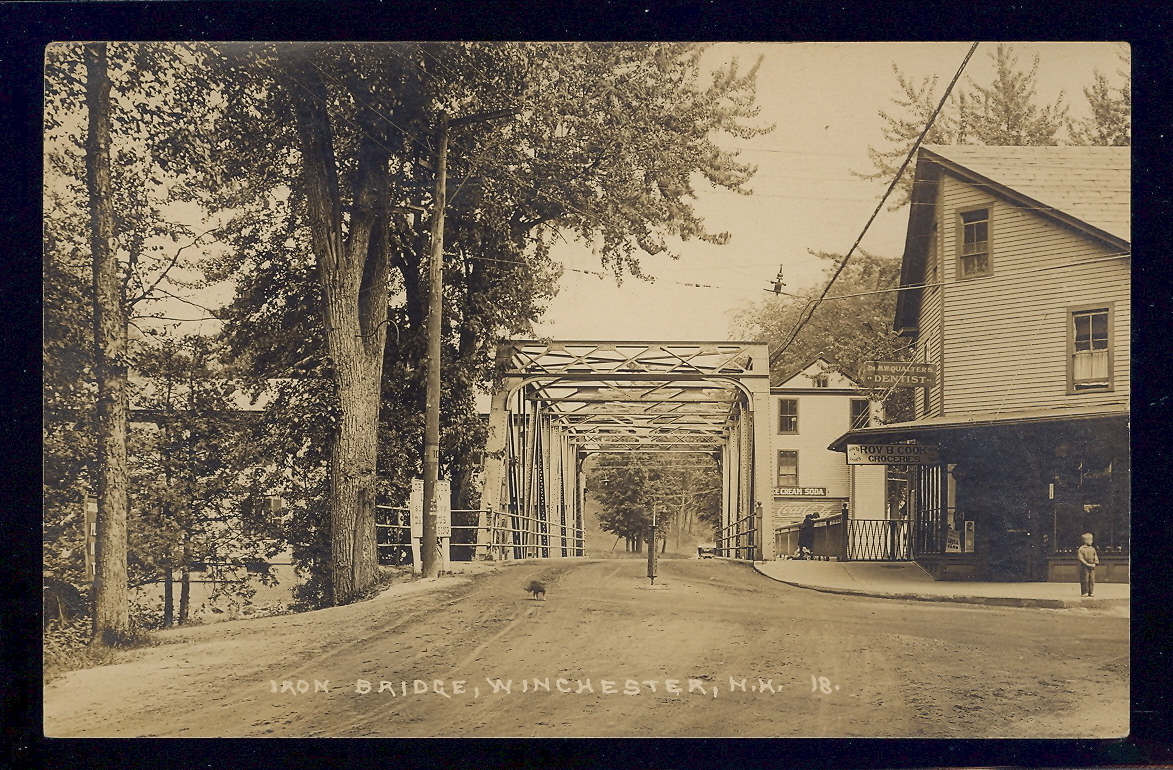
Iron bridge c. 1910

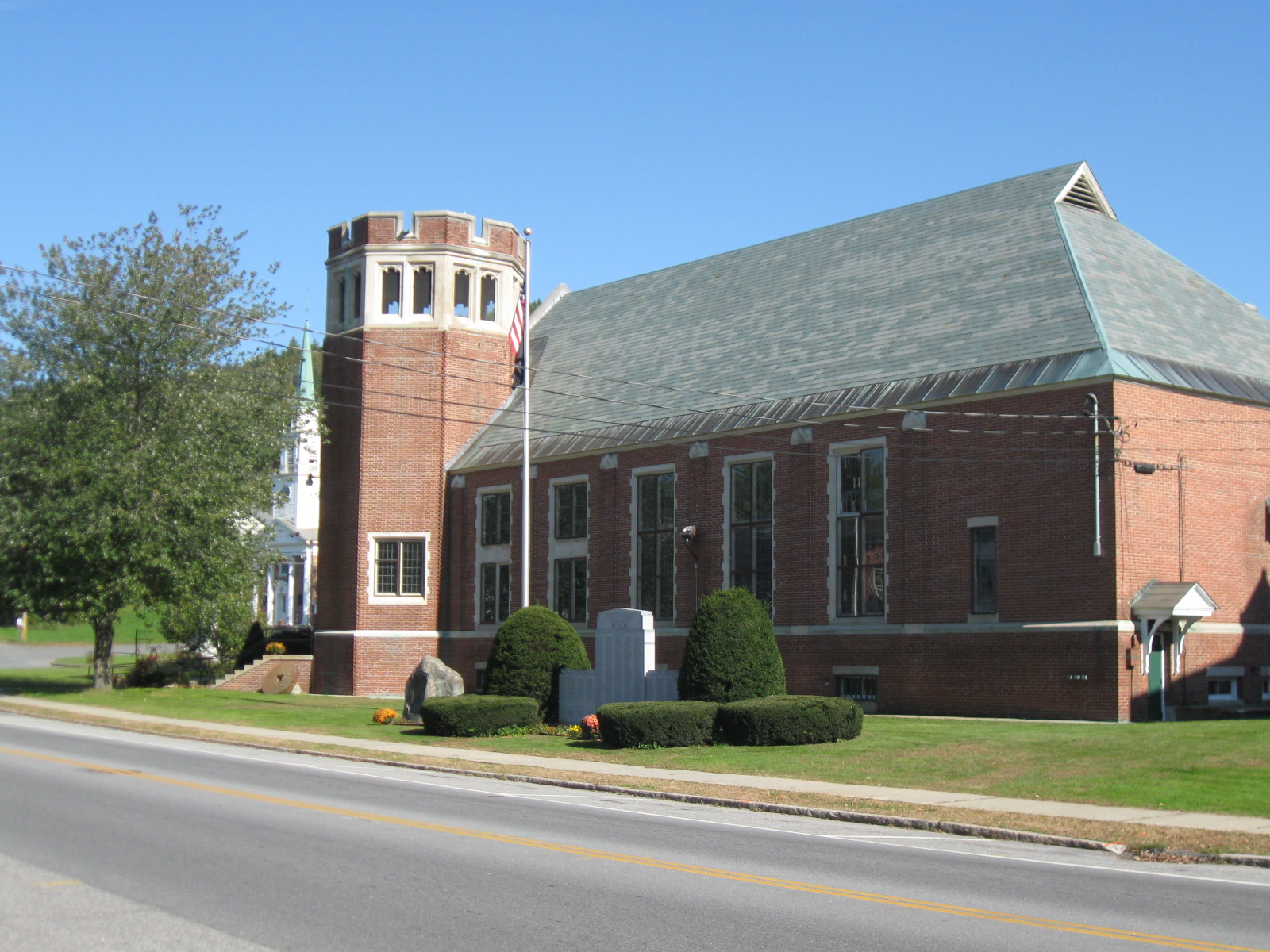
Winchester Town Hall

== Geography ==
According to the United States Census Bureau, the town has a total area of 55.6 square miles (143.9 km^{2}), of which 55.0 square miles (142.4 km^{2}) are land and 0.6 square miles (1.5 km^{2}) are water, comprising 1.01% of the town. Winchester is drained by the Ashuelot River and its tributary Mirey Brook. Pisgah Reservoir and Kilburn Pond are in the northwest. The entire town is part of the Connecticut River watershed. The highest point in Winchester is 1,424-foot (434 m) Franklin Mountain, near the town's northeastern corner.

Winchester is served by state routes 10, 78 and 119.

=== Adjacent municipalities ===
- Chesterfield (north)
- Swanzey (northeast)
- Richmond (east)
- Warwick, Massachusetts (south)
- Northfield, Massachusetts (southwest)
- Hinsdale (west)

== Demographics ==
Historical population
Census	Pop.	Note	%±
1790	1,209		—
1800	1,413		16.9%
1810	1,478		4.6%
1820	1,849		25.1%
1830	2,051		10.9%
1840	2,065		0.7%
1850	3,296		59.6%
1860	2,225		−32.5%
1870	2,097		−5.8%
1880	2,444		16.5%
1890	2,584		5.7%
1900	2,274		−12.0%
1910	2,282		0.4%
1920	2,267		−0.7%
1930	2,183		−3.7%
1940	2,275		4.2%
1950	2,388		5.0%
1960	2,411		1.0%
1970	2,869		19.0%
1980	3,465		20.8%
1990	4,038		16.5%
2000	4,144		2.6%
2010	4,341		4.8%
2020	4,150		−4.4%
2024 (est.)	4,225		1.8%
U.S. Decennial Census

As of the census of 2010, there were 4,341 people, 1,689 households, and 1,129 families residing in the town. There were 1,932 housing units, of which 243, or 12.6%, were vacant. 124 of the vacant units were for seasonal or recreational use. The racial makeup of the town was 96.1% white, 0.5% African American, 0.5% Native American, 0.6% Asian, 0.0% Native Hawaiian or Pacific Islander, 0.5% some other race, and 1.8% from two or more races. 1.8% of the population were Hispanic or Latino of any race.

Of the 1,689 households, 31.9% had children under the age of 18 living with them, 47.5% were headed by married couples living together, 12.3% had a female householder with no husband present, and 33.2% were non-families. 24.3% of all households were made up of individuals, and 9.6% were someone living alone who was 65 years of age or older. The average household size was 2.54, and the average family size was 2.97.

In the town, 22.9% of the population were under the age of 18, 8.4% were from 18 to 24, 24.3% from 25 to 44, 29.9% from 45 to 64, and 14.7% were 65 years of age or older. The median age was 41.1 years. For every 100 females, there were 98.0 males. For every 100 females age 18 and over, there were 93.9 males.

For the period 2011–2015, the estimated median annual income for a household was $44,760, and the median income for a family was $53,864. Male full-time workers had a median income of $37,213 versus $37,056 for females. The per capita income for the town was $23,404. 13.9% of the population and 12.8% of families were below the poverty line. 20.8% of the population under the age of 18 and 9.9% of those 65 or older were living in poverty.

== Culture ==
Since 1998, Winchester has held its annual Pickle Festival each September on its Main Street.

== Sites of interest ==
- Ashuelot Covered Bridge
- Conant Library Museum
- Monadnock Speedway
- Sheridan House (1870), the Winchester Historical Society Museum
- Winchester Town Hall

== Notable people ==
- Jane Grace Alexander (1848–1932), banker
- Henry Ashley (1778–1829), US congressman
- Michael Dubruiel (1958–2009), Roman Catholic author
- Louis B. Goodall (1851–1935), industrialist, banker, US congressman
- Marshall Jewell (1825–1883), 44th and 46th governor of Connecticut
- Francis P. Murphy (1877–1958), 64th governor of New Hampshire
- Addison Pratt (1802–1872), early Latter-day Saints convert and missionary
- Leonard Wood (1860–1927), US Army chief of staff
