= Addison Pratt =

American LDS Church missionary (1802–1872)

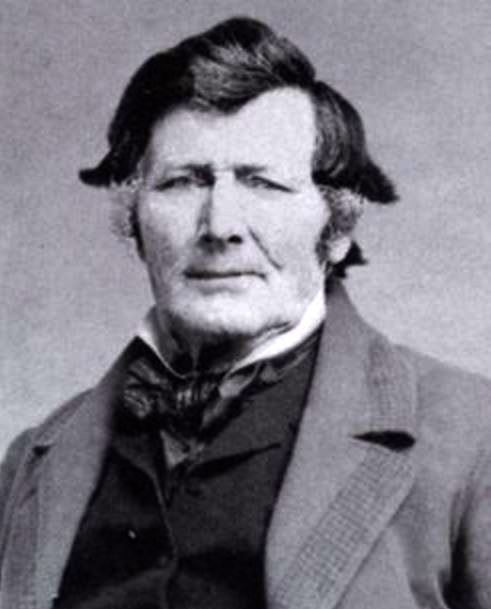
- Born: February 21, 1802; Winchester, New Hampshire
- Died: October 10, 1872 (aged 70); Anaheim, California
- Spouse: Louisa Barnes Pratt

Addison Pratt (February 21, 1802 – October 10, 1872) was an early Latter-day Saint convert and missionary. Pratt preached in French Polynesia from 1844 to 1848 and from 1850 to 1852, and is recognized by the Church of Jesus Christ of Latter-day Saints as the first Latter-day Saint missionary to preach in a language other than English.

== Life ==
Pratt was born in Winchester, New Hampshire. Raised a farmer, he was employed as a whaler in New England for more than a decade. He married Louisa Barnes, born in Warwick, Massachusetts, early feminist, an early contributor to the Women's Exponent, author of her own famous memoirs, and sister to Caroline Barnes Crosby, another influential early frontier woman writer and feminist.

After being taught by Caroline Barnes Crosby and Jonathan Crosby, early Mormon converts, the Pratts converted to Mormonism and joined the Latter Day Saints in Indiana, Missouri, and later moved to Nauvoo, Illinois. Years later, the Pratts persuaded the Crosbys to join them in missionary work in the Pacific Islands.

== Polynesia ==
While working aboard a whaling ship as a young man, Pratt had jumped ship in Hawaii and spent several months living near the village of Honolulu; he was one of the first men of European descent to live in the Hawaiian islands. During that time, he learned to speak the Hawaiian language. Years later, in October 1843, Pratt recommended to Joseph Smith that the Church begin missionary work among the Polynesians, whom he expected to be receptive. Smith sent Pratt, Benjamin Franklin Grouard, Noah Rogers and Knowlton F. Hanks to create a mission in the Pacific Islands. They were the Church's first foreign language speaking missionaries. Hanks died en route and was buried at sea. Pratt disembarked at Tubuai in the Austral Islands on April 30, 1844, and began teaching in the Hawaiian language, noting its similarity to the local dialect of Tahitian. He later preached in Tahiti and other nearby islands and atolls.

== Pioneer ==
Pratt returned to the United States in 1847. In December 1847 he was made president of the newly formed San Francisco Branch of the LDS Church. Pratt resigned the presidency of that branch about a month later and left to join his family in Utah Territory. He traveled to San Bernardino, California in 1849, and by early 1850 had made his way back to San Francisco. His wife Louisa was called to serve a mission with him and went from Utah to San Francisco with a group of LDS missionaries heading to Hawaii in 1850.

Pratt and his family returned to Tubuai in 1850. In May 1852, the French government restricted the preaching of Mormonism in the islands, and Pratt and his family were held under house arrest until they eventually were able to return to California. Pratt declined invitations from church leaders and entreaties of his wife Louisa to follow the practice of plural marriage. As a result, Pratt and his wife were separated and estranged for much of his later life. Pratt died in Anaheim, California and is buried at Anaheim Cemetery.

Pratt was present at the discovery of gold in California, working at Sutter's Mill at the time of discovery. He worked in the gold fields in 1848, waiting for winter to pass so that he could be re-united with his family in Salt Lake City. Pratt's journal chronicles this time period, including his interactions with Samuel Brannan and members of the Donner Party. After the Donner Party tragedy the year before, Pratt elected to pursue an alternate route over the Sierras when traveling eastward to Salt Lake City.

After spending the winter of 1849 in Salt Lake City with his wife and daughters and teaching a class in Tahitian to prospective missionaries, Pratt and Jefferson Hunt blazed a route from Salt Lake City southward through present-day Las Vegas and San Bernardino, and then northward to Sacramento. The trail they carved would be followed by many settlers and Forty-niners. For much of its distance, that route is now followed by I-15.

The Hunt and Pratt group is notable for being the first to discover gold and silver in Southern Nevada, recommending to Brigham Young the colonization of Southern Nevada, including Las Vegas specifically, and most famously for a group of malcontents that split with Pratt's and Hunt's leadership. They sought to cross the Sierras farther north and became known as the infamous Death Valley '49ers party. That group of prospectors became impatient with the slow progress of Mormon leadership and elected to abandon the larger group. Those staying with Hunt made the journey without serious incident. Later, some members of the Death Valley party rejected their new leaders and rejoined the Hunt party after one of Hunt's scouts discovered them nearly starved to death.

== Legacy ==
Pratt's journals are an important source for historians, vividly illustrating the life of a whaler and seaman in the 19th century, being one of only a few primary sources on the discovery of gold and the Donner Party, and are otherwise important as a resource for California history, Polynesian history and Mormon history.

Lois Barnes Pratt, Addison Pratt's daughter, married John Hunt, son of Jefferson Hunt. The two settled Navajo County, Arizona Territory. Through Ida Frances (their daughter), Pratt's posterity include Smiths (by Asahel Henry Smith, son of Jesse N. Smith), Udalls (by David King Udall), Kartchners and other early Arizona clans. Through daughters Ellen Saphronia Pratt McGary and Frances Stevens Pratt Dyer, Pratt's descendants figure prominently in the history and settling of Orange County and San Bernardino County, California.

== Descendants ==
Pratt has a number of noteworthy descendants:

- Frank Grouard, adopted son, scout and adopted brother of Sitting Bull, scout to General Crook
- Ida Hunt Udall, granddaughter, homesteader and diarist in eastern Arizona
- John Hunt Udall, great-grandson, Mayor of Phoenix, Arizona
- Jesse Addison Udall, great-grandson, Chief Justice of the Arizona Supreme Court
- Don Taylor Udall, great-grandson, Arizona State Legislator
- Nick Udall, 2nd great-grandson, Mayor of Phoenix, Arizona
- Gordon Harold Smith, 3rd great-grandson, U.S. Senator from Oregon
- other members of the Udall family

== See also ==
- California Gold Rush
- Donner Party
- History of Tahiti
- Sutter's Mill
- The Church of Jesus Christ of Latter-day Saints in Hawaii
- Udall family
- Whaling
