= Benjamin Franklin Grouard =

American missionary (1819–1894)

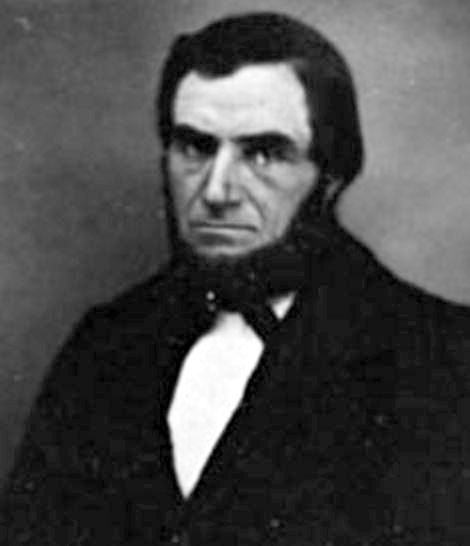

Personal details
- Born: January 4, 1819 Stratham, New Hampshire
- Died: March 18, 1894 (aged 75) Santa Ana, California
- Occupation: Farmer, brickmaker

Benjamin Franklin Grouard (January 4, 1819 – March 18, 1894) was one of the earliest Latter Day Saint missionaries to the Society Islands, which now constitute French Polynesia.

Grouard was born in Stratham, New Hampshire. He joined the Church of Jesus Christ of Latter Day Saints and in 1843 was called to go with Addison Pratt, Noah Rogers and Knowlton Hanks, with the plan to preach the gospel in Hawaii. On the trip aboard a whaling ship, Hanks died. Due to ship sailing schedules they were only able to reach the Society Islands. They had many converts there and Grouard married a native woman. When the other missionaries left Grouard stayed.

After Pratt returned he reconnected with Grouard. In 1852, Grouard and his family returned to the United States, settling in San Bernardino, California. In 1855, Grouard left the church and became Disfellowshipped and excommunicated. During this time he became a spiritualist.

Grouard was the father of the army scout Frank Grouard.
