= The Church of Jesus Christ of Latter-day Saints in the United Kingdom =

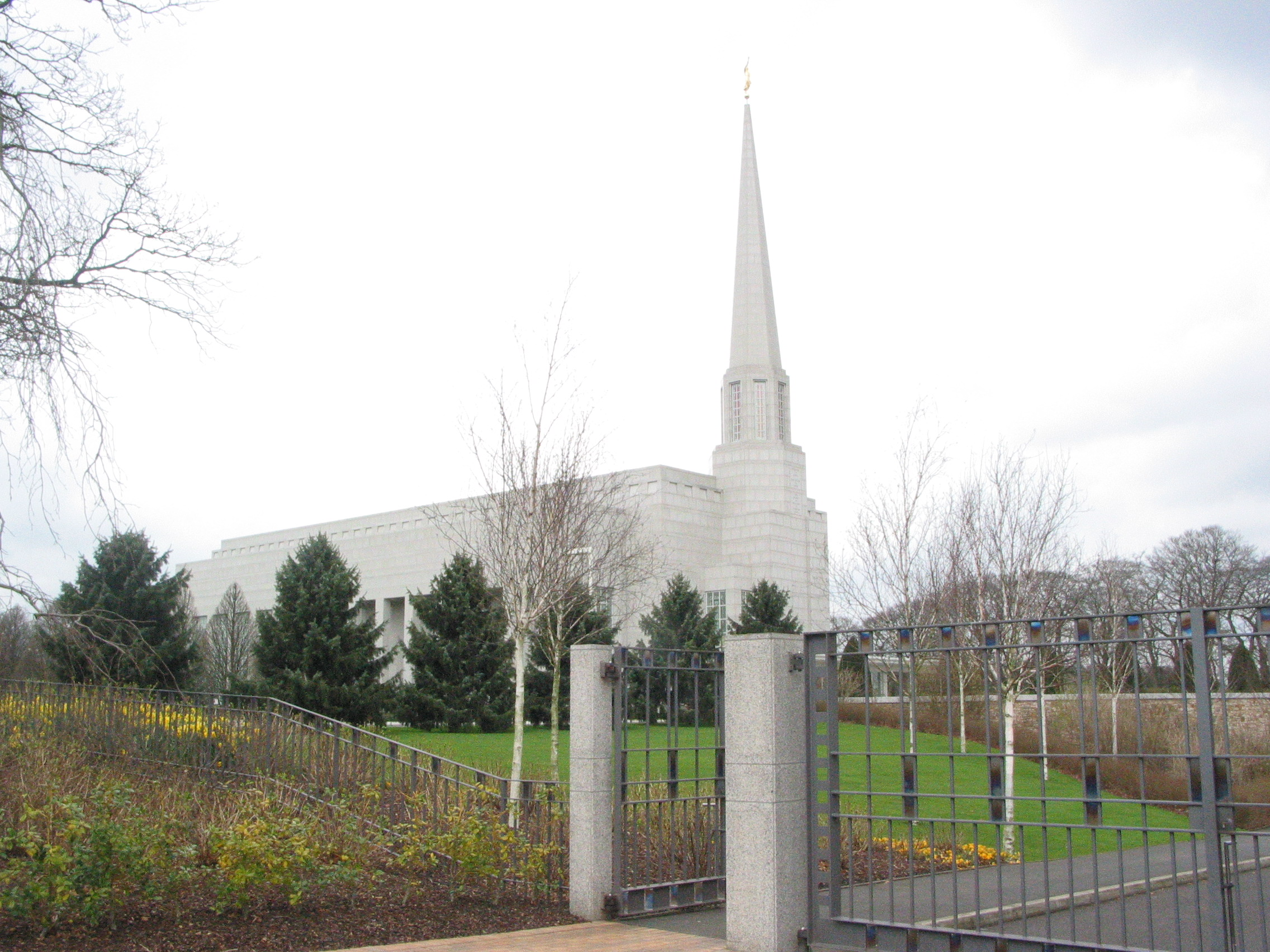
- The Preston England Temple
- Area: Europe North
- Members: 190,066 (2025)
- Stakes: 41
- Wards: 257
- Branches: 41
- Total congregations: 298
- Missions: 6
- Temples: 2 operating; 1 under construction; 1 announced; 4 total
- FamilySearch Centers: 121

The Church of Jesus Christ of Latter-day Saints in the United Kingdom refers to the Church of Jesus Christ of Latter-day Saints (LDS Church) and its members in the United Kingdom. In 2019, the United Kingdom had the second highest number of LDS Church members per capita among countries in Europe, behind Portugal.

== History ==
LDS Church missionaries first arrived in the UK in 1837, though, according to the church, a large number of converts ultimately emigrated to the United States so that, by 1870, nearly half of Utah's population were British immigrants.

== Church activity in the UK ==
Membership in the United Kingdom
Year	Members
1841*	6,000
1930	5,912
1940	6,481
1950	6,793
1960	6,500
1970	13,814
1980	89,854
1989*	152,000
1999	174,152
2009	183,672
2019	188,187
2025	190,066
*Membership was published as an estimate or rounded number. Source: Windall J. Ashton; Jim M. Wall, Deseret News, various years, Church Almanac Country Information: United Kingdom

The LDS Church opened its Mormon Helping Hands programme in Britain. The project runs off of donations and volunteer work from church members, and provides service in local communities by Latter-day Saints who live there.

In the summer of 2013, the United Kingdom hosted the first official church pageant outside of North America. Titled "Truth Will Prevail", it told the story of early missionary efforts in Britain. The pageant included 33 core cast members, 300 family cast, and a 150-voice choir.

== Stakes ==
For a complete listing of stakes see

- England Stakes
- Scotland Stakes
- Wales Stakes
- Northern Ireland Stake

== Missions ==
Mission	Organized
England Birmingham Mission	6 Mar 1961
England Bristol Mission	28 Jun 2022
England Leeds Mission	27 Mar 1960
England London Mission	20 Jul 1837
England Manchester Mission	1 Jul 1976
Scotland/Ireland Mission	28 Feb 1961

== Temples ==
Temples in the United Kingdom
Red = Operating
Yellow = Announced
Blue = Under Construction
Black = Closed for Renovations

On 7 September 1958, the London England Temple was dedicated by church president David O. McKay.

On 7 June 1998, the Preston England Temple was dedicated by church president Gordon B. Hinckley.

12. London England Temple; Official website; News & images	
Location: Announced: Groundbreaking: Dedicated: Rededicated: Size: Style:	Newchapel, Surrey, England; 17 February 1955 by David O. McKay; 27 August 1955 by David O. McKay; 7 September 1958 by David O. McKay; 18 October 1992 by Gordon B. Hinckley; 42,652 sq ft (3,962.5 m^{2}) on a 32-acre (13 ha) site Modern contemporary, single spire - designed by Edward O. Anderson
52. Preston England Temple; Official website; News & images	
Location: Announced: Groundbreaking: Dedicated: Size: Style:	Chorley, Lancashire, England; 19 October 1992 by Ezra Taft Benson; 12 June 1994 by Gordon B. Hinckley; 7 June 1998 by Gordon B. Hinckley; 69,630 sq ft (6,469 m^{2}) on a 32-acre (13 ha) site Modern, single-spire design - designed by Church A&E Services
257. Birmingham England Temple (Under construction); Official website; News & images	
Location: Announced: Groundbreaking: Size:	Sutton Coldfield, Birmingham, England; 3 April 2022 by Russell M. Nelson; 22 March 2025 by Scott D. Whiting; 10,800 sq ft (1,000 m^{2}) on a 2.7-acre (1.1 ha) site
343. Edinburgh Scotland Temple (Announced); Official website; News & images	
Location: Announced:	Edinburgh, Scotland; 7 April 2024 by Russell M. Nelson

== Membership statistics ==
Table shows LDS membership statistics as of 31 December 2011 for various regions and nations of the UK, along with British Crown Dependencies.

Country/Dependency/ Territory	Membership	Stakes	Wards	Branches	Total Congregations	Missions	Temples
England	145,385	36	230	28	258	5	2
Northern Ireland	5,297	1	8	3	13		
Scotland	26,598	5	26	13	39	1	
Wales	9,491	2	18	6	24		
Bermuda	156			1	1		
British Virgin Islands	150			2	2		
Cayman Islands (Note: LDS Church Membership is still reported and used 31 December 2022 member and congregational statistics instead.)	230			1	1		
Falkland Islands	10			1	1		
Gibraltar	16						
Guernsey	60			1	1		
Isle of Man	281		1		1		
Jersey	282		1		1		
Turks and Caicos Islands	92			1	1		

== See also ==
- The Church of Jesus Christ of Latter-day Saints in England
- The Church of Jesus Christ of Latter-day Saints in Wales
- The Church of Jesus Christ of Latter-day Saints in Scotland
- The Church of Jesus Christ of Latter-day Saints in Ireland
- The Church of Jesus Christ of Latter-day Saints in the Isle of Man
- The Church of Jesus Christ of Latter-day Saints in Bermuda
- Religion in the United Kingdom
