= The Church of Jesus Christ of Latter-day Saints in England =

Christian denomination

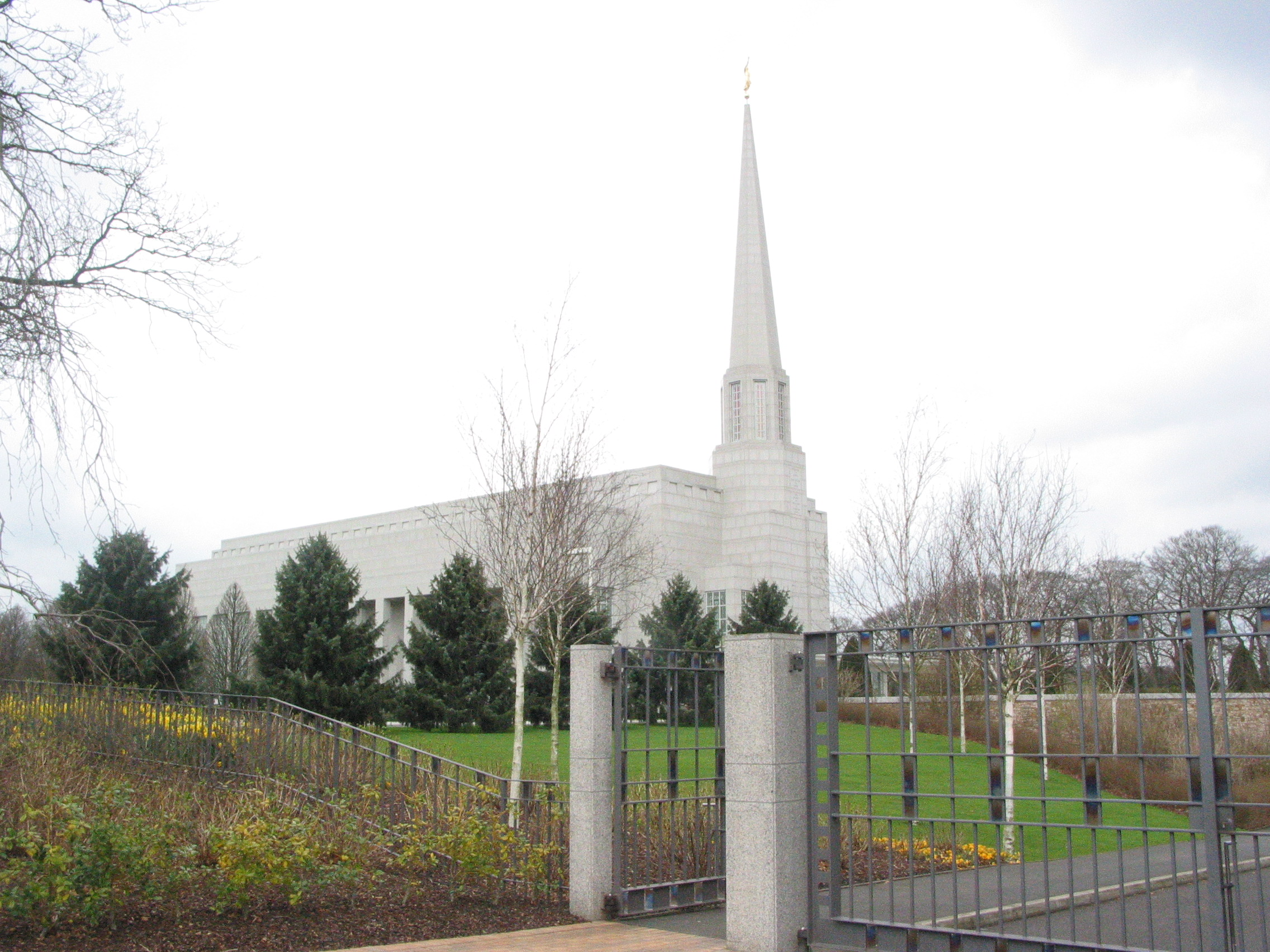
- The Preston England Temple
- Area: Europe North
- Stakes: 33
- Missions: 5
- Temples: 2 operating; 1 under construction; 3 total
- FamilySearch Centers: 103

The Church of Jesus Christ of Latter-day Saints in England refers to the Church of Jesus Christ of Latter-day Saints (LDS Church) and its members in England. England has five missions, and both temples in the United Kingdom. With 145,385 members in 2011, England had more LDS Church members than any other country in Europe.

== History ==
The LDS Church traces its origins to western New York state in the United States and was formally established by Joseph Smith in 1830. The church's early history was defined in part by its missionary activities and, due to the shared language, England was one of the earliest places to be proselytised. Some early members were also English, or of English origin, living in the US.

=== 1837–1841: early missions to England ===
In 1837, Smith approached Heber C. Kimball in the Kirtland Temple and called for him to proclaim the gospel in England. This calling was then also extended to Orson Hyde, Willard Richards, and Joseph Fielding. They left Kirtland, Ohio, for New York on 13 June 1837 and were met by three other missionaries (John Goodson, Isaac Russell, and John Snyder). On 1 July, this group of seven set off together for Liverpool, England, on the vessel Garrick and arrived on 20 July 1837.

Two days later they went by coach to Preston where Joseph Fielding had a brother, Reverend James Fielding, who agreed to allow them to preach in his Vauxhall Chapel during the morning service on 23 July 1837. Kimball and Hyde both spoke at the meeting and the missionaries would return to Vauxhall Chapel to speak further at that afternoon's service and on the following Wednesday. However, after that, James Fielding became aware some of his congregation had requested to be baptised by the missionaries and they were stopped from giving any further speeches there.

Nine of Fielding's congregation were baptised on Sunday morning 30 July 1837 in the nearby River Ribble, before a crowd of thousands. The first to be baptised into the LDS Church in England was George D. Watt. On 6 August 1837, the first branch of the church was established in Preston, which remains today the oldest continuously functioning unit of the LDS Church.

In September 1837, the group obtained access to a building, "The Cockpit", by way of the Preston Temperance Society and meetings began to be held there regularly, including the first general conference of the LDS Church in England, which was held on Christmas Day 1837. By the time this conference was held, there were several branches, or small congregations, established in Alston, Bedford, Whittle, Daubers, Hunter's Hill, Chatburn, and Penwortham, among other places.

On 8 April 1838, a second conference was held at which Joseph Fielding became president of the British Mission, with Richards and William Clayton as counselors. On 20 April 1838, the other members of this first mission, who were not staying on, left Liverpool to return to the US aboard the ship Garrick. In that first year of proselytising there had been around 1600 baptisms in the United Kingdom, and nearly 1500 were mostly attributable to Heber C. Kimball alone.

==== The United Brethren donate the Gadfield Chapel ====
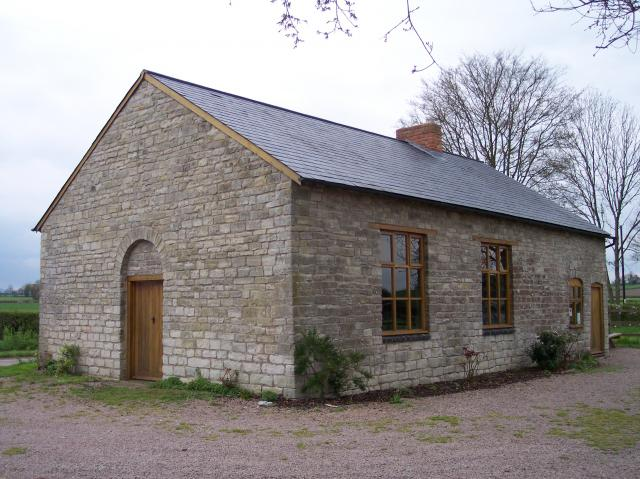
The oldest Mormon Chapel in the world: Gadfield Elm Chapel, near Pendock

In 1838, Joseph Smith announced that the Quorum of the Twelve should travel to the United Kingdom on a mission. They arrived between January and April 1840. Among the church's first apostles to arrive was Wilford Woodruff who, in March 1840, was introduced to leaders of the United Brethren and began preaching to their congregation. A constable had been sent by the rector of the parish with a warrant to arrest him. At the close of the meeting, seven people offered themselves for baptism, including four preachers and the constable. Within 18 days, two of the most influential members of the United Brethren, John Benbow and Thomas Knighton, were baptised. 30 days later, Woodruff had baptised 45 preachers and 160 members of the United Brethren, who put into his hands their Gadfield Elm Chapel and 45 houses licensed for preaching. By 1841, nearly 1,800 additional people had converted, including all but one of the 600 United Brethren. The Gadfield Elm Chapel became the church's first chapel in the United Kingdom and is the oldest extant chapel of the LDS Church. It was restored between 1994 and 2000.

In May 1840, the first issue of the Millennial Star, a magazine for British Latter-day Saints, was printed. It would be published regularly until 1970, becoming the longest continuously published periodical of the LDS Church. By the end of 1840 there were 3,626 church members in Britain.

=== 1841–1900: growth, emigration and decline ===
In 1841, richly-bound copies of the Book of Mormon were presented to Queen Victoria and Prince Albert by Lorenzo Snow, who received an audience with Her Majesty. On that occasion Queen Victoria autographed an album of Snow's, which became a prized possession in his family.

After the death of Joseph Smith and the succession crisis that followed, the church in England also experienced schisms over leadership. In 1846, some members in Liverpool were excommunicated for joining the Church of Jesus Christ of Latter Day Saints (Strangite), and in 1862, local members were warned to be wary of missionaries from the Reorganized Church of Jesus Christ of Latter Day Saints who had begun proselytising in England.

By 1850, British membership had risen to 30,747 members (which was slightly more than the total in the United States at that time) and a further 7,500 had already emigrated to the United States. John Moon had brought the first company of 4 converts with him on the ship Britannia from Liverpool in June 1840. By the end of 1840 at least 290 converts had emigrated to the US and another 800 members made the voyage the next year. Writing of the members preparing for one such ocean voyage, Charles Dickens described these pioneer Latter-day Saints in chapter 22 of his book The Uncommercial Traveller as, by his estimation, "the pick and flower of England". Following the death of Joseph Smith and the subsequent migration west of the Latter-day Saints from Nauvoo to Salt Lake City, migration from the British Isles to the United States increased greatly. This emigration was aided by the church's Perpetual Emigration Fund.

In 1877, half of the 140,000 Latter-day Saints in Utah were of British origin. This migration would leave its mark upon Utah, which as of 2000 had the highest percentage of population claiming English descent (29%) of any state in the US. Beginning in 1891, Latter-day Saint leaders in America increasingly began to encourage the European members to remain in their homelands and build up the church in those countries. By 1892, the church membership still in the British Isles had fallen to only 2,604, despite around 111,330 baptisms occurring between 1837 and 1900. In a similar period of time at least 52,000 and up to 100,000 members had emigrated to the United States.

The Pearl of Great Price, now part of the Standard Works of the LDS Church, was first compiled in Liverpool in 1851 by Franklin D. Richards.

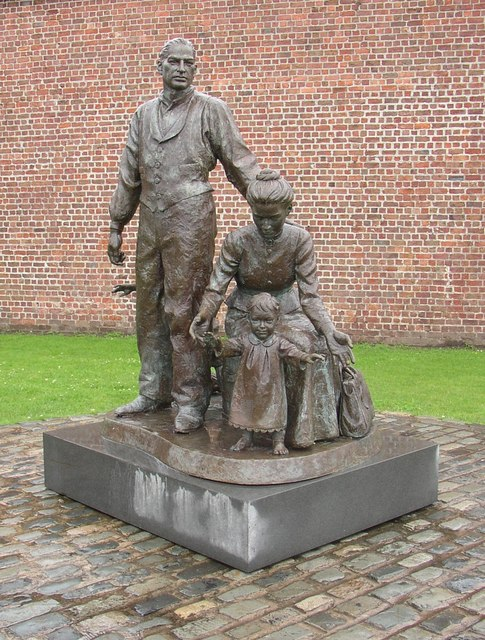
The Emigrants statue, located in Albert Dock, Liverpool, commemorates Mormon emigration from the port of Liverpool

=== 1900–1950: new growth and stability ===
The first decade of the 20th century was a period of rapid expansion unlike any the church in the UK had seen since the 1860s. However, increased visibility led to a new wave of opposition and persecution.

A well-organised 'anti-Mormon' campaign was mounted by various ministers and Latter-day Saints who had turned from the church. They lectured and published pamphlets accusing the missionary programme of being a disguise for Americans to enslave British girls as polygamous wives. Missionaries were sometimes attacked. In February 1913, an anti-Mormon riot in Sunderland possibly led to the death of an American missionary, Ralph H. Hendricks, though his death certificate stated he died from fever and the LDS Church's own publication's obituary stated he died after a two-month illness. Opponents of the LDS Church demanded that Home Secretary Winston Churchill and the Home Office persuade Parliament to expel Latter-day Saint missionaries and refuse entry to more. Churchill opposed exaggerated claims and collected favorable police reports from key cities. When the 'Mormon question' came up in Parliament again, Churchill said that although he had not completed his investigation, he had found nothing against the LDS Church members.

When the First World War began in 1914, all American LDS Church missionaries in the United Kingdom were evacuated back to the US. The Lloyd George ministry banned the church's missionaries from reentering Britain in 1918 after the war, despite mission president George Albert Smith's protest that they had peacefully worked in Britain for more than 80 years. Missionaries would not return in significant numbers until mid-1920, after United States Senators Reed Smoot and William H. King caused the American State Department to intervene. The movie Trapped by the Mormons, inspired by Winifred Graham's book of the same title, led to widespread anti-Mormon rhetoric throughout the British Isles. The ban on LDS missionaries was in part because of fears of the prewar anti-Mormon violence resuming, but incidents were minor. Although Graham and other anti-Mormons continued to denounce the church, the government told them that there was no evidence that missionaries were acting in a way to justify deportation.

In 1937, leaders in the United Kingdom celebrated the church's centennial in the British Isles. During the first 100 years, 126,593 people had been baptised, and at least 52,000 of these had immigrated to the US.

After the outbreak of the Second World War all the church's American missionaries were again evacuated. This was completed by early 1940 when Hugh B. Brown, then serving as president of the British Mission, returned to the US. In his place, a local Latter-day Saint, Andre K. Anastasiou, was appointed. Brown returned to the UK on 29 March 1944 and again began serving as the mission president. American missionaries would begin to return in 1946. In 1946, Selvoy Jared Boyer, (missionary to England from 1923 to 1928), returned to England to be the first mission president to be called and set apart to head the British Mission after the completion of World War II. He served from 1946 to 1949.

=== 1950–2000 ===
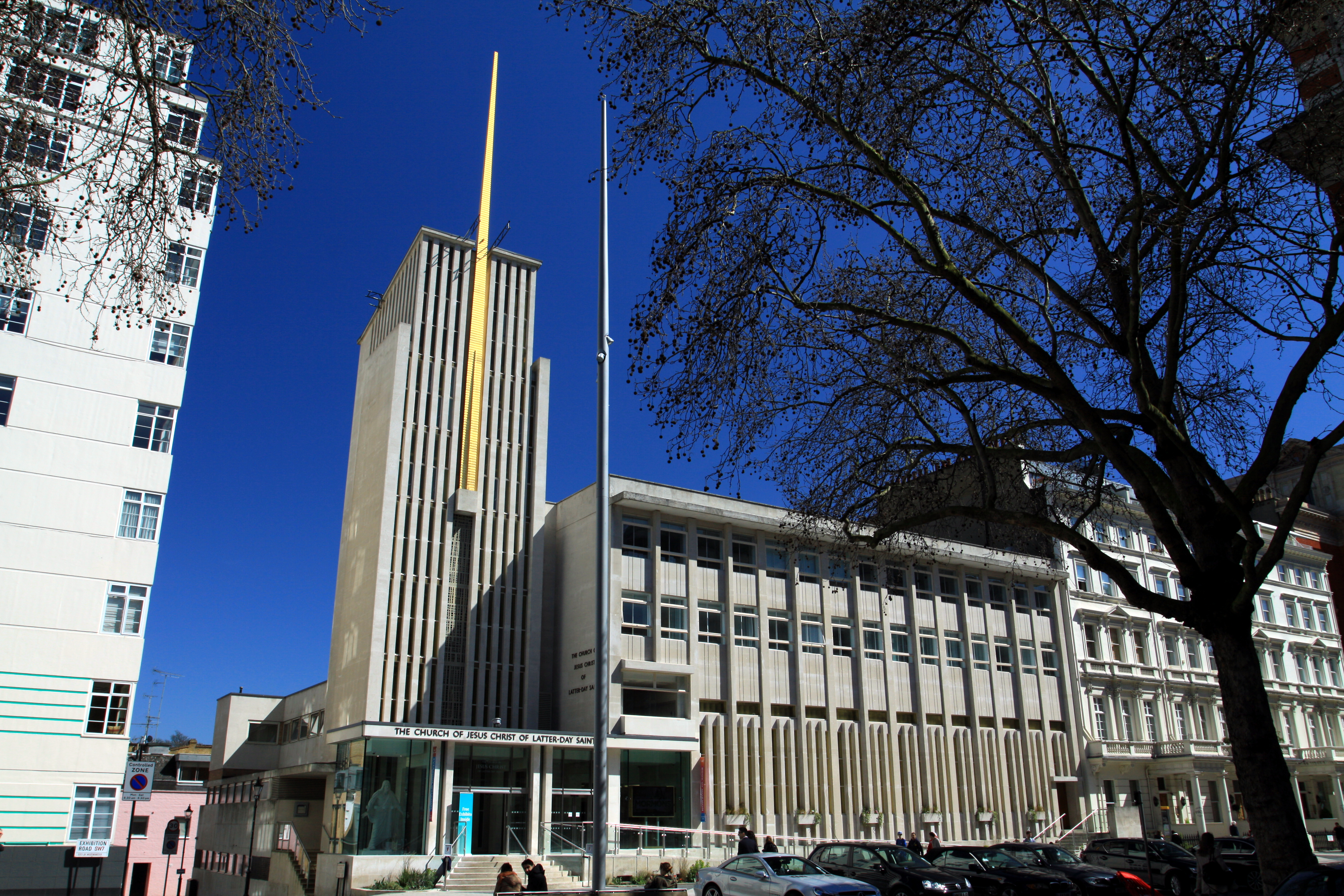
The Hyde Park Chapel which includes a meetinghouse, visitor center, and family history center

In the 1950s, emigration to the US began to be discouraged and local congregations proliferated.

In the late 1950s through to the early 1960s, a new focus on growth in convert numbers led to the introduction of "Youth Baptism Program", which became colloquially known as the "Baseball Baptism Program". This used baseball and other team sports as a way to bring young teenage boys into the LDS Church. Introduced by mission president T. Bowring Woodbury, who led the British mission from October 1958 to January 1962, it dramatically increased the baptism rate for new converts (in 1962 there were 12,000 converts alone) but controversy over the focus on numbers, the pressure on missionaries from the British Mission headquarters and the use of deception to get boys to agree to baptism led to the program being ended by 1965, and ex-communications (which was the process of cancelling membership at that time) of most of the inactive new converts followed.

During the same period, the LDS Church engaged in a massive building program. Prior to the administration of church president David O. McKay, most British congregations met in rented rooms and buildings. This was considered a detriment to the LDS Church's proselytizing and in the early 1960s, a large number of chapels were constructed around the British Isles.

Based on studies of information submitted to the Genealogical Society, it was estimated in 1971 that 80 percent of the members of the church in the world were of British extraction.

In the early 1970s, the Mormon sex in chains case brought the church some unwanted publicity in national newspapers. A young missionary, Kirk Anderson, went missing in 1977, in Ewell, Surrey, after he was abducted from the steps of a church meetinghouse. A few days later, a freed Anderson made a report to the police that he had been abducted, driven to Devon, and imprisoned against his will, chained to a bed in a cottage, where Joyce Bernann McKinney (b. August 1949) — a former (1973) Miss Wyoming World — had abducted and then raped him. The case became known by many sobriquets, including "The Mormon sex in chains case" and "The Case of the Manacled Mormon". The coverage was extensive in part because the case was considered so anomalous, involving as it did the issue of rape of a man by a woman. In 2010, documentary filmmaker Errol Morris made Tabloid (2010), based on the media sensation surrounding the story.

The second LDS temple in England was the Preston England Temple, dedicated in 1998. The temple is located in the town of Chorley, 10 miles (16 km) south of Preston, in Lancashire, England.

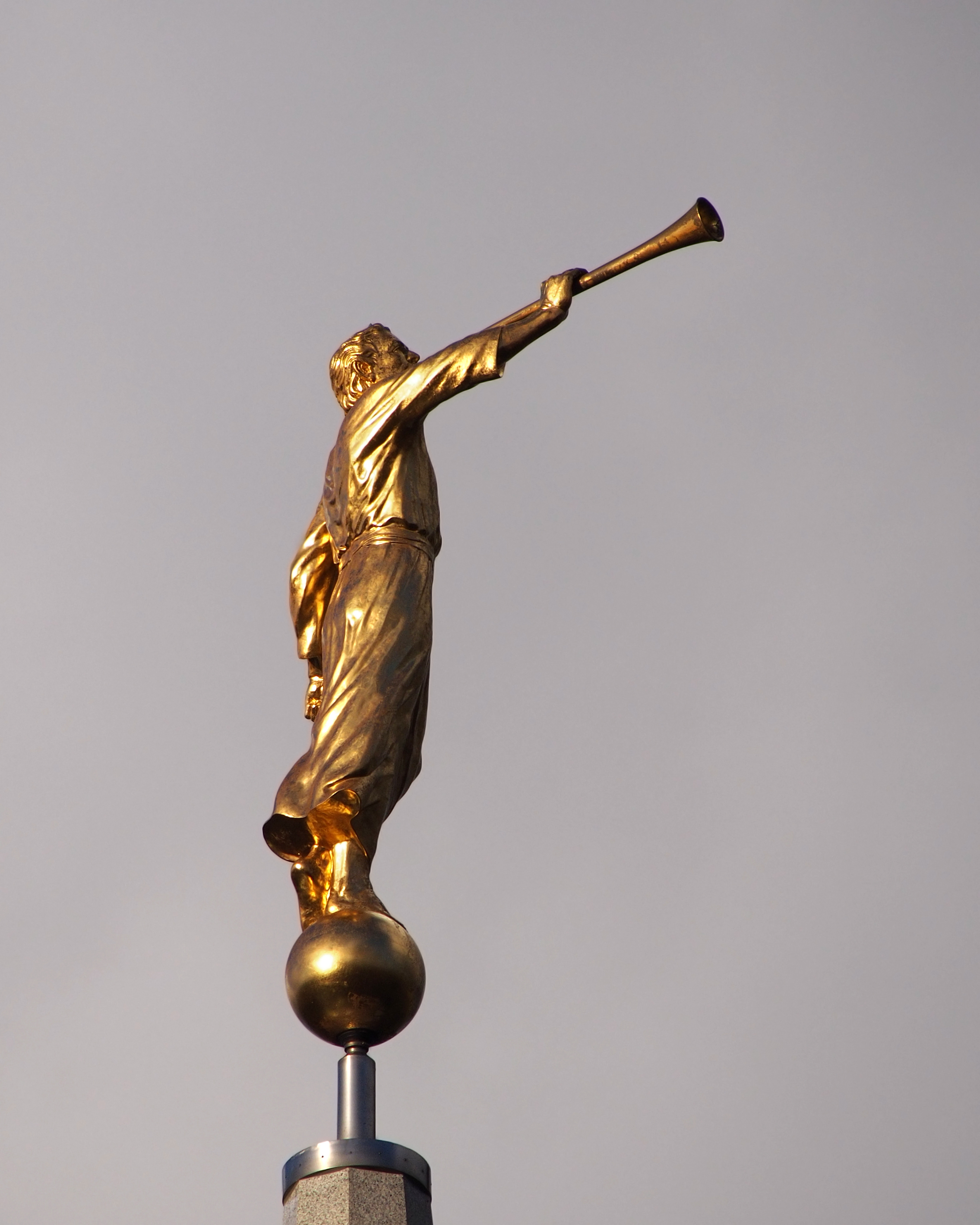
Angel Moroni atop the temple spire (2015)

It is the centrepiece of a 15-acre (6 hectare) complex that includes a stake centre, a missionary training centre, a family history facility, a distribution centre, temple patron housing, temple missionary accommodations, and a grounds building. The temple itself has a modern, single spire design and an exterior finish of Olympia white granite from Sardinia.

The white granite exterior and zinc roof have caused it to be described as reminiscent of England's old churches. The angel Moroni statue atop the spire is known as, "one of the landmarks of the M61". The temple has four ordinance rooms and four sealing rooms, and is the largest Latter-day Saint temple in Europe, at 69,630 square feet (6,470 m^{2}).

=== Since 2000 ===
In 2012, the LDS Church's Hyde Park Chapel in London was reopened following extensive remodeling for worship services and as a visitors' center, featuring a replica statue of Thorvaldsen's Christus which can be seen from the roadside.

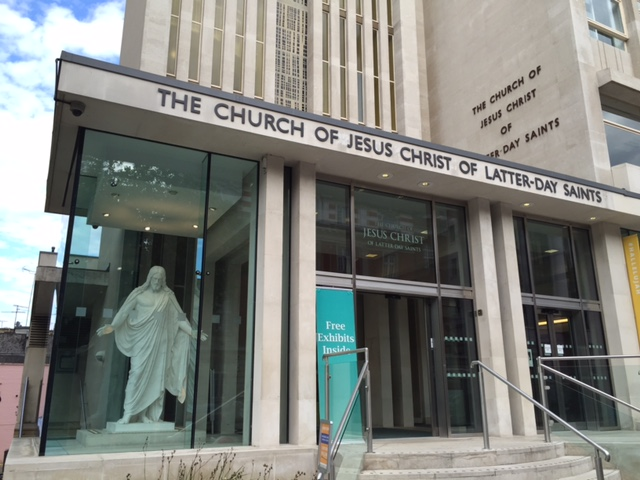
Thorvaldsen's Christus

In 2013, the Tony Award-winning Broadway production called The Book of Mormon opened on London's West End. The musical was widely interpreted to be provocative by both its creators and church members. The LDS Church reacted by putting advertisements on the London Underground and buses, many of them pointing to a website associated with the "I'm a Mormon" campaign. Many English members posted their own views and testimonies on this website.

In 2014, Tom Phillips, a former church stake president, brought a private prosecution for fraud against the former church president, Thomas S. Monson, through the English and Welsh court system. After a summons for Monson was issued by Westminster Magistrates' Court, the case was thrown out by Senior District Judge Howard Riddle who ruled that the case was "an abuse of the process of the court" and that "the court is being manipulated to provide a high-profile forum to attack the religious beliefs of others".

In 2016, Baroness Emma Nicholson invited Jeffrey R. Holland to speak at a conference at Windsor Castle addressing religious persecution and its role in forced migration.

== Stakes ==
Stake	Organized	Mission	Temple District
Billingham England	13 Jun 1976	England Leeds	Preston England
Birmingham England	14 Sep 1969	England Birmingham	Preston England
Bristol England	29 Apr 1973	England Bristol	London England
Canterbury England	27 Aug 1995	England London	London England
Cardiff Wales	9 May 1982	England Bristol	London England
Cheltenham England	21 Mar 1982	England Bristol	London England
Chester England	6 Jun 1982	England Manchester	Preston England
Chorley England	13 Nov 2005	England Manchester	Preston England
Coventry England	9 May 1993	England Birmingham	London England
Crawley England	19 Aug 1977	England London	London England
Huddersfield England	19 Mar 1961	England Leeds	Preston England
Hull England	26 Apr 1973	England Leeds	Preston England
Ipswich England	29 May 1983	England Birmingham	London England
Leeds England	12 Nov 1976	England Leeds	Preston England
Leicester England	5 Mar 1961	England Birmingham	London England
Liverpool England	14 Mar 1976	England Manchester	Preston England
London England Hyde Park	28 May 1978	England London	London England
Greater Manchester England	27 Mar 1960	England Manchester	Preston England
Merthyr Tydfil Wales	12 Jan 1975	England Bristol	London England
Newcastle-Under-Lyme England	17 Jan 1975	England Manchester	Preston England
Northampton England	13 Feb 1977	England Birmingham	London England
Norwich England	20 Jun 1971	England Birmingham	London England
Nottingham England	4 Feb 1973	England Birmingham	Preston England
Plymouth England	27 Nov 1977	England Bristol	London England
Southampton England	11 Feb 1973	England Bristol	London England
Preston England	17 Jun 1976	England Manchester	Preston England
Sheffield England	14 Nov 1982	England Leeds	Preston England
St Albans England	28 May 1978	England London	London England
Staines England	28 May 1978	England London	London England
Sunderland England	17 Mar 1963	England Leeds	Preston England
Thames East England	24 Nov 1974	England London	London England
Thames Valley England	24 May 1973	England London	London England
York England	24 Nov 1996	England Leeds	Preston England

== Missions ==
There are 5 missions in England, namely

Mission	Organized
England Birmingham Mission	6 Mar 1961
England Bristol Mission	28 Jun 2022
England Leeds Mission	27 Mar 1960
England London Mission	20 Jul 1837
England Manchester Mission	1 Jul 1976

== Temples ==
The LDS Church has two temples in England. The London England Temple serves the south of Britain. It was dedicated in 1958 by then-church president David O. McKay. Its public open house was attended by 76,324 people.

A second temple was completed in 1998 in Chorley, near Preston and is known as the Preston England Temple. It serves northern England, north Wales, all of Ireland and Scotland. It was dedicated on 7 June 1998 by then-church president Gordon B. Hinckley.

Temples in England
Red = Operating
Yellow = Announced
Blue = Under Construction
Black = Closed for Renovations

12. London England Temple; Official website; News & images	
Location: Announced: Groundbreaking: Dedicated: Rededicated: Size: Style:	Newchapel, Surrey, England; 17 February 1955 by David O. McKay; 27 August 1955 by David O. McKay; 7 September 1958 by David O. McKay; 18 October 1992 by Gordon B. Hinckley; 42,652 sq ft (3,962.5 m^{2}) on a 32-acre (13 ha) site Modern contemporary, single spire - designed by Edward O. Anderson
52. Preston England Temple; Official website; News & images	
Location: Announced: Groundbreaking: Dedicated: Size: Style:	Chorley, Lancashire, England; 19 October 1992 by Ezra Taft Benson; 12 June 1994 by Gordon B. Hinckley; 7 June 1998 by Gordon B. Hinckley; 69,630 sq ft (6,469 m^{2}) on a 32-acre (13 ha) site Modern, single-spire design - designed by Church A&E Services
257. Birmingham England Temple (Under construction); Official website; News & images	
Location: Announced: Groundbreaking: Size:	Sutton Coldfield, Birmingham, England; 3 April 2022 by Russell M. Nelson; 22 March 2025 by Scott D. Whiting; 10,800 sq ft (1,000 m^{2}) on a 2.7-acre (1.1 ha) site

== Notable English Latter-day Saints ==
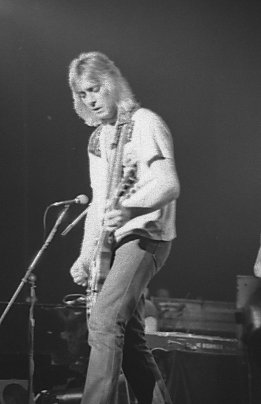
Mick Ronson

- Mick Ronson, guitarist with David Bowie, Mott the Hoople and others.
- William S. Godbe, British convert who went on to found the Church of Zion (Godbeites)
- John Taylor, third President of the LDS Church and the only one to be born outside of the US.
- William Bickerton, follower of Sidney Rigdon who went on to found his own church
- Terry Rooney, former Labour Member of Parliament (MP) for Bradford North, the first Latter-day Saint to sit in the British House of Commons.
- Anne Perry, author and involved in the Parker–Hulme murder case as a child.
- Alvin Gittins, artist and faculty member at University of Utah.

== See also ==
- Religion in England

== Sources ==
- Evans, Richard L. (1984) [1937], A Century of "Mormonism" in Great Britain, Salt Lake City: Publishers Press, ISBN 978-0916095079, OCLC 866138200
- Evans, Richard L. (1971). "History of the Church in Great Britain". Ensign. September 1971.
- Rasmussen, Matthew L. (2016) [2016]. Mormonism and the Making of a British Zion. Salt Lake City: University of Utah Press. ISBN 978-1607814870. OCLC 975271934.
