= The Church of Jesus Christ of Latter-day Saints in Scotland =

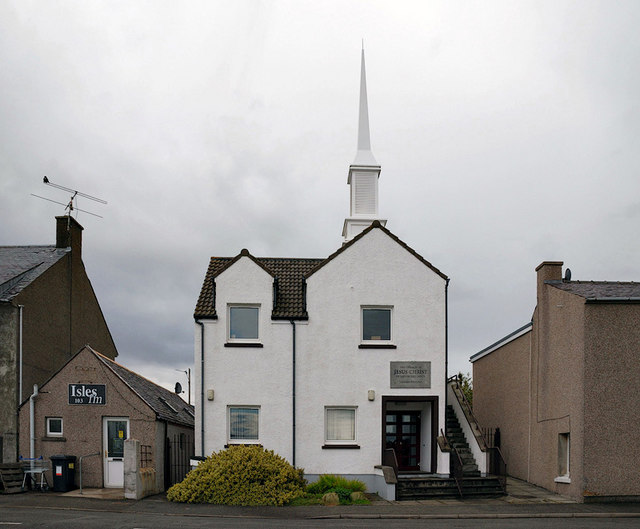
- A meetinghouse for the Branch in Stornoway, Outer Hebrides
- Area: Europe North
- Stakes: 5
- Wards: 24
- Branches: 11
- Total congregations: 35
- Missions: 1
- FamilySearch Centers: 19

The Church of Jesus Christ of Latter-day Saints in Scotland represents the Scottish organization and members of the Church of Jesus Christ of Latter-day Saints (LDS Church).

== History ==
=== First Missionaries in Scotland ===
==== Wright and Mulliner ====
Two native Scots, Alexander Wright and Samuel Mulliner, became the church's first missionaries to Scotland after they were converted while living in Ontario, Canada, arriving on 20 December 1839. They began teaching the gospel to their own families, so they traveled to Edinburgh to visit Mulliner's parents. After which Wright traveled to Marnoch in Banffshire to share the gospel with his family despite suffering from smallpox. The two reunited and began preaching systematically in Glasgow. On 14 January 1840, Mulliner baptised the first converts in Scotland, Alexander Hay and his wife, Jessie, in the River Clyde at Bishopton near Paisley. Mulliner and Wright reunited, and on 2 February 1840 baptised two young men from Leith.

==== Orson Pratt's missionary efforts ====
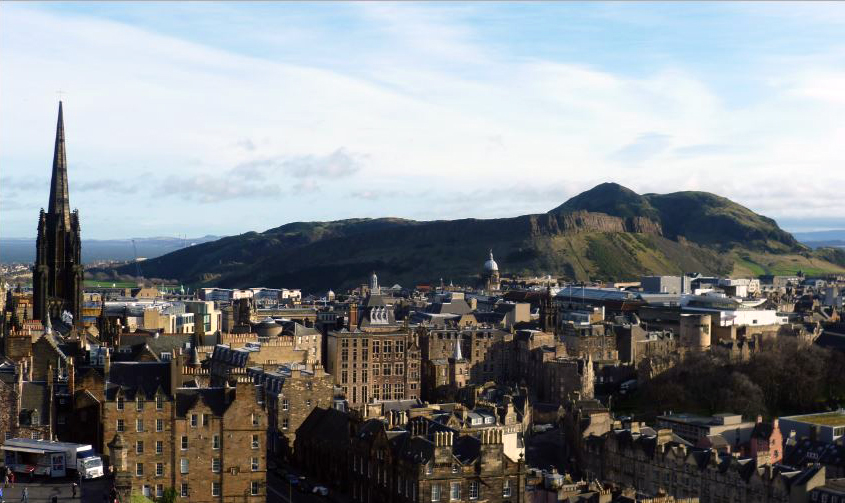
Arthur's Seat from Edinburgh Castle

Orson Pratt arrived in Scotland on 8 May 1840 to supervise the missionaries. At the time of Pratt's arrival, there were 80 Latter-day Saints in the area, thanks to the efforts of Wright and Mulliner so Pratt was able to organise the church's first branch in Scotland at Paisley. Pratt earnestly prayed for 200 converts at Arthur's Seat, a hill in Holyrood Park, Edinburgh. Pratt called two more missionaries to the area: Hiram Clark and Reuben Hedlock. They worked alongside Wright in Paisley, while Pratt and Mulliner began proselyting in Edinburgh. Mulliner would return to the United States in 1840.

Pratt and Mulliner preached every night in the streets of the city, and were able to baptise 23 new converts by the end of the summer of 1840. Pratt was unsatisfied with their success in the area and decided to try a new approach: writing. While in Edinburgh, Pratt wrote and published the pamphlet An Interesting Account of Several Remarkable Visions. It included the first published account of Joseph Smith's first vision, and with the scriptures, became a standard church publication in Scotland. Pratt distributed this pamphlet for 10 months until he returned home in March 1841, leaving the mission under George D. Watt. Pratt would later return to Scotland throughout this life to visit the saints. Wright remained in Scotland until 1842. Due to the efforts of these early missionaries, there were 70 branches by 1848, and by 1853 the church had grown to over 3,000 members.

=== Membership decline in the late 19th century ===
Early church members were usually workers in lowland industrial areas who turned to religion out of a "reflex of despair." Despite attempts at Gaelic language preaching by William McKay in 1847, and even the printing of a Gaelic language pamphlet "Do Luchdsiridh Rioghachd Dhe" (Seekers after the Kingdom of God) in 1850, few Highlanders joined the church.

With an increase in church membership, there were four conferences held in Scotland in Glasgow, Kilmarnock, Edinburgh, and Dundee between 1855 and 1859. The growth of the church did not go unnoticed. Some of the church members in the mid-19th century were persecuted. Violent acts occurred in Kirkpatrick when members were stoned, and also in Busby where mobs gathered. In 1850, Scots law "prohibited the disruption of religious assemblies" to avoid violence in Edinburgh.

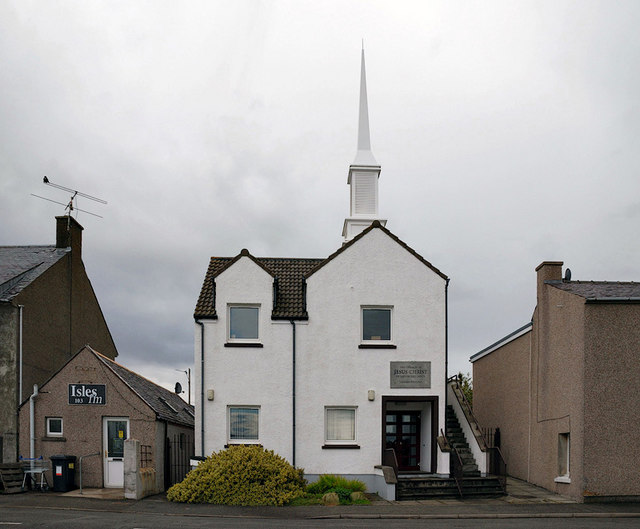
Stornoway branch.

Despite these strong early beginnings, the church would face a decline in membership after the 1850s due to a number of factors. The church had encouraged members to join with the Saints in the United States and emigrate to Utah. In the 1850s, 1,800 church members emigrated to the United States and approximately 1,600 members emigrated during the next decade. Missionaries during this time period also reported that fewer people were interested in learning about the church and there was a "spirit of indifference," perhaps attributed to the reformations and revitalisation of the Church of Scotland. Large groups of church members were also excommunicated for violations of church standards. Scotland was also in a depression during this time which could have contributed to church decline, along with other potential factors. The teachings and organization of the LDS Church was effectively stagnant until the 1960s when new social and economic conditions were established in the country.

In March 1862, Amasa Mason Lyman, a church apostle, gave a speech in Dundee which, when 5 years later Brigham Young and other LDS Church leaders saw a copy of it, would lead to him being stripped of the apostleship.

A well-organised 'anti-Mormon' campaign was mounted by various ministers and Latter-day Saints who had turned from the church. They lectured and published pamphlets accusing the missionary programme of being a disguise for Americans to enslave British girls as polygamous wives. Missionaries were sometimes attacked. Opponents of the LDS Church demanded that Home Secretary Winston Churchill and the Home Office persuade Parliament to expel Latter-day Saint missionaries and refuse entry to more. Churchill opposed exaggerated claims and collected favorable police reports from key cities. When the 'Mormon question' came up in Parliament again, Churchill said that although he had not completed his investigation, he had found nothing against the LDS Church members.

When the First World War began in 1914, all American LDS Church missionaries in Scotland, as throughout the United Kingdom, were evacuated back to the USA. The Lloyd George ministry banned the church's missionaries from reentering Britain in 1918 after the war, despite mission president George Albert Smith's protest that they had peacefully worked in Britain for more than 80 years. Missionaries would not return in significant numbers until mid-1920, after United States Senators Reed Smoot and William H. King engaged the American State Department to intervene. The movie Trapped by the Mormons, inspired by Winifred Graham's book of the same title, led to widespread anti-Mormon rhetoric throughout the British Isles. The ban on LDS Church missionaries was in part because of fears of the pre-war anti-Mormon violence resuming, but except for one 1922 attack during a church service in Edinburgh where a crowd of 100 students tarred and feathered two elderly missionaries and a church member, incidents were minor. Although Graham and other anti-Mormons continued to denounce the church, the government told them that there was no evidence that missionaries were acting in a way to justify deportation.

After the outbreak of the Second World War, all the church's American missionaries were again evacuated. This was completed by early-1940 when Hugh B. Brown, then serving as president of the British Mission, returned to the USA. In his place a local Latter-day Saint, Andre K. Anastasiou, was appointed. Brown returned to the UK on 29 March 1944 and again began serving as the mission president. American missionaries would begin to return in 1946.

=== 1950s to present ===
Beginning in the 1950s, emigration to the United States began to be discouraged and local congregations began to proliferate. The members in Scotland were in the British Mission until it was split in 1960; they then became part of the North British Mission. The following year the Scottish-Irish Mission was formed, which was later divided. The first stake was formed in Glasgow in 1962, and 13 years later the second stake was established in Dundee. The Scottish mission has since been merged back in with the Irish one.

Today, church members in Scotland participate in all church organizations and programs, including seminary and institute, and many of the young men and women serve missions for the church.

== Stakes ==
As of May 2026, the following stakes were located in Scotland:

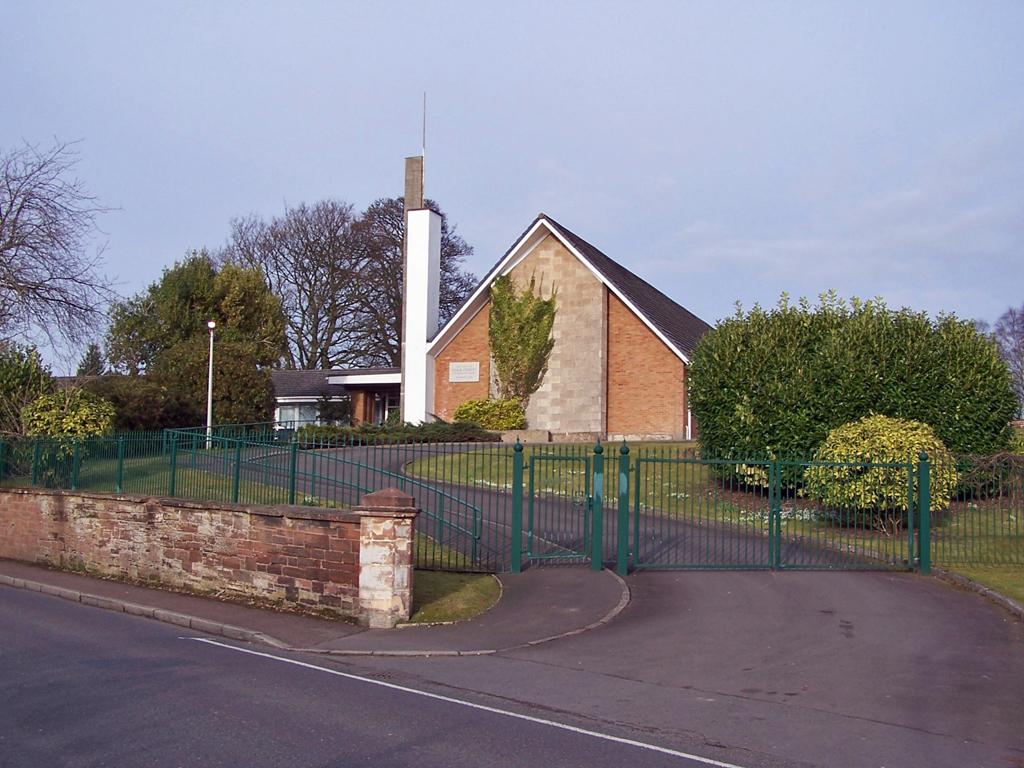
A meetinghouse of The Church of Jesus Christ of Latter-day Saints in Dumfries.

Stake	Organized
Aberdeen Scotland	12 Oct 1980
Dundee Scotland	23 Nov 1975
Edinburgh Scotland	12 Oct 1980
Glasgow Scotland	26 Aug 1962
Paisley Scotland	12 Oct 1980

== Missions ==
There is currently a single mission serving Scotland, which is shared with Ireland:

- Scotland/Ireland Mission

== Temples ==
There are currently no LDS Church temples in Scotland. The Preston England Temple in Lancashire has served Scotland since 1998. However, during the April 2024 general conference, church president Russell M. Nelson announced that a temple will be constructed in Edinburgh.

343. Edinburgh Scotland Temple (Announced); Official website; News & images	
Location: Announced:	Edinburgh, Scotland; 7 April 2024 by Russell M. Nelson

== Notable Scottish Latter-day Saints ==
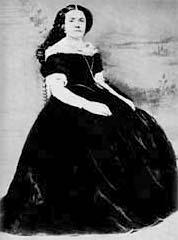
Eilley Bowers

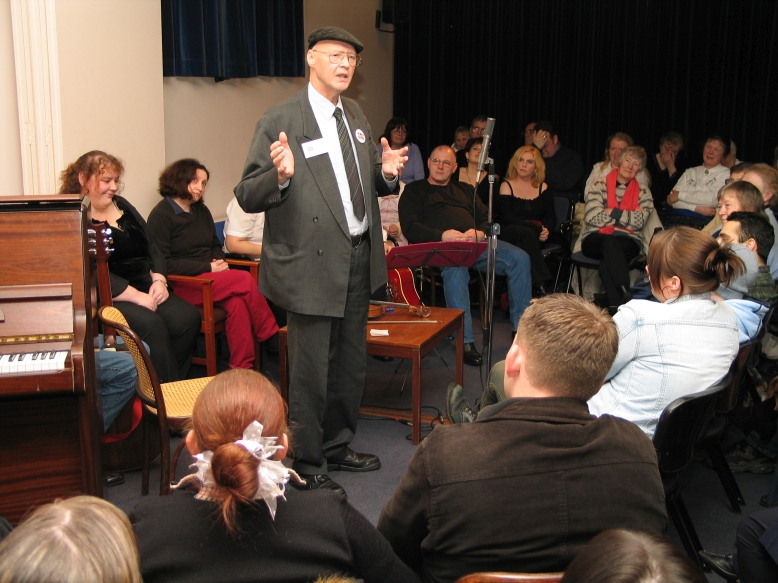
Stanley Robertson

- Brian Adam — first Latter-day Saint member of the Scottish Parliament, and later became a government minister
- David S. Baxter, First Quorum of the Seventy, born in Scotland, moved to England as a child.
- Eilley Bowers, born in Scotland, emigrated to the United States after becoming a Latter-Day Saint. She was, in her time, one of the richest women in the United States though she died penniless.
- Johnny Cunningham, folk musician in Silly Wizard, brother of Phil (left the church)
- Phil Cunningham, accordionist and folk musician. (left the church)
- Stephen Kerr, Scottish Conservative MP and MSP
- John Lyon, poet and writer of the American frontier.
- Stanley Robertson, master storyteller, ballad singer and author of several books of Lowland Traveller tales.
- Robert Sands (conductor), born in Ireland, but converted while living in Scotland.
- Jane McKechnie Walton, born in Scotland, emigrated to the United States as a young child after her family converted.

== See also ==
- Religion in Scotland
