= Macbeth (1922 film) =

1922 film directed by H. B. Parkinson

- Directed by: H. B. Parkinson
- Based on: Play Macbeth by William Shakespeare
- Produced by: Frank Miller
- Starring: Russell Thorndike, Sybil Thorndike
- Release date: 1922
- Country: United Kingdom
- Language: Silent film (English intertitles)

Macbeth is a black and white 1922 film adaptation of the William Shakespeare play Macbeth. It was the last silent film version of that play produced, and the eighth film adaptation of the play. It was directed by H. B. Parkinson and produced by Frank Miller. The film is part of a series of film adaptations of Shakespeare with Sybil Thorndike and her interpretation of Lady Macbeth was noted at the time.

== Cast ==
- Russell Thorndike as Macbeth
- Sybil Thorndike as Lady Macbeth
