= The Law Divine =

1920 film

- Directed by: H. B. Parkinson; Challis Sanderson
- Written by: H. V. Esmond
- Produced by: H. B. Parkinson
- Starring: H. V. Esmond
- Release date: November 1920
- Running time: Five reels
- Country: United Kingdom
- Language: Silent

The Law Divine is a 1920 silent British crime film directed by H. B. Parkinson and Challis Sanderson. The film is considered to be lost.

== Cast ==
- H. V. Esmond as Captain Jack le Bras
- Eva Moore as Edie le Bas
- Evelyn Brent as Daphne Grey
- Mary Brough as Cook
- Leonard Upton as Ted le Bas
- John Reid as Bill le Bas
- Dorothy Wordsworth as Claudia Merton
- Florence Wood as Mrs. Gaythorne
- Margaret Watson as Kate
