= The Lure of the Atlantic =

1929 film by Norman Lee

- Directed by: Norman Lee
- Written by: Norman Lee
- Produced by: H.B. Parkinson
- Starring: Eric Hales; Iris Darbyshire; John St. John
- Production company: H.B. Parkinson
- Distributed by: Fox Film Company
- Release date: October 1929
- Country: United Kingdom
- Languages: Silent; English intertitles

The Lure of the Atlantic is a 1929 British silent drama film directed by Norman Lee and starring Eric Hales, Iris Darbyshire and John St. John. It was made at Isleworth Studios.

== Cast ==
- Eric Hales as The Reporter
- Iris Darbyshire as The Wife
- John St. John as The Gambler
- Fletcher Lightfoot as Alcock
- Rexford Burnett as Brown

== Bibliography ==
- Low, Rachael. Filmmaking in 1930s Britain. George Allen & Unwin, 1985. ISBN 978-0-04-791042-5.
- Wood, Linda. British Films, 1927-1939. British Film Institute, 1986.
