= Eric Hales =

British actor (1901–1993)

Eric Manville Hales (6 August 1901 – 1993) was a British actor.

== Selected filmography ==
- The Second Mate (1928)
- The Lure of the Atlantic (1929)
- Chelsea Life (1933)
- Anne One Hundred (1933)
- The Secret of the Loch (1934)
- Lucky Days (1935)
- Blue Smoke (1935)
- The Last Curtain (1937)
- There Was a Young Man (1937)
- Double Alibi (1937)
- Strange Experiment (1937)
- Cross My Heart (1937)
- Under the Red Robe (1937)
- Contraband (1940)
