= The Church of Jesus Christ of Latter-day Saints in Bermuda =

- Area: North America Northeast
- Members: 197 (2022)
- Branches: 1

The Church of Jesus Christ of Latter-day Saints in Bermuda refers to the Church of Jesus Christ of Latter-day Saints (LDS Church) and its members in the British Overseas Territory of Bermuda. As of December 31, 2022, The Church of Jesus Christ of Latter-day Saints reported 197 members in one congregation, the Bermuda Branch, in Bermuda.

== History ==
In July 1953, Latter-day Saint sailors and airmen from the United States Armed Forces, stationed at Naval Station White's Island and Kindley Air Force Base, along with their families, marked the first presence of the church in Bermuda. A Relief Society was formed on July 16 by the wives of some servicemembers, under the direction of the Eastern States Mission. In 1957, the first organized worship services were held at Kindley AFB. Church membership on the island grew to 65 by 1966 and in May, the Bermuda government granted permission for two senior missionaries, Arthur L. and Melba McMullin, to proselytize on the island. Three weeks later, younger missionaries were also granted permission to proselytize in rotations of up to six months. Elders Kenneth R. French and Curt S. Call were the first of these missionaries.

On June 25, 1966, the Bermuda Branch was formed with about 50 members. In 1974, the branch was put under the direction of the New York New York Mission, and from 1993 to 2018, was under the direction of the newly formed New York New York South Mission. After the New York South Mission combined with the New York North Mission, the branch was placed under the direction of the combined New York New York City Mission. The first baptisms of Bermudians occurred in the mid-1980s. The branch met in the Lyceum Building located at 15 Wilkinson Avenue in Hamilton Parish, initially leasing the upstairs. After a period of growth, the entire building was renovated, with a chapel being built downstairs and classrooms and offices being located upstairs. In 2022, the branch had 197 members.

In the 1970s, Elder Ronald A. Rasband, now of the Quorum of the Twelve Apostles, served nine months of his mission in Bermuda.

In 2014, missionaries in Bermuda participated in the End-to-End Race, a fundraising event where people race the length of the island.

In May 2024, after 58 years in the Lyceum Building, the branch was relocated to the historic Hamilton House at 10 Queen Street in Hamilton. A dedication of the new building was held on May 19, 2024.

== Missions ==
Bermuda does not have its own mission and is served by the New York New York City Mission.

== Temples ==
There are no LDS temples in Bermuda. It is currently in the Manhattan New York Temple district. During the Manhattan temple's remodel, which began in March 2024 and is expected to last until mid-2027, the Washington D.C. Temple is the assigned temple for Bermuda.

== See also ==
- The Church of Jesus Christ of Latter-day Saints in New York
- The Church of Jesus Christ of Latter-day Saints in the United Kingdom
