= H. B. Parkinson =

British film director

- Born: Henry Broughton Parkinson; 29 September 1884; Blackburn, England
- Died: 19 August 1970 (aged 85); England
- Occupations: Film director, film producer
- Years active: 1918–1930

Henry Broughton Parkinson (29 September 1884 – 19 August 1970) was a British film pioneer. He produced 85 films between 1918 and 1930 and directed more than 30 titles between 1920 and 1927.

== Selected filmography ==
- Rock of Ages (1918)
- Darby and Joan (1920)
- Calvary (1920)
- The Law Divine (1920)
- The Marriage Lines (1921)
- Macbeth (1922)
- Married to a Mormon (1922)
- Trapped by the Mormons (1922)
- A Tale of Two Cities (1922)
- The Second Mate (1928)
- The Streets of London (1929)
- The Lure of the Atlantic (1929)
