= Married to a Mormon =

1922 film

- Directed by: H. B. Parkinson
- Written by: Frank Miller
- Produced by: H. B. Parkinson
- Starring: Evelyn Brent; Clive Brook; George Wynn
- Production company: Master Films
- Distributed by: Astra Film
- Release date: 29 May 1922
- Running time: Five reels
- Country: United Kingdom
- Language: Silent

Married to a Mormon is a 1922 silent British drama film directed by H. B. Parkinson and starring Evelyn Brent, Clive Brook and George Wynn. The film is anti-Mormon and involves the taking of young virginal English women to Utah to become wives. It is considered to be a lost film.

== Cast ==
- Evelyn Brent as Beryl Fane
- Clive Brook as Lionel Daventry
- George Wynn as Philip Lorimer
- Booth Conway as Bigelow
- Molly Adair

== See also ==
- Trapped by the Mormons
