= The Second Mate (1928 film) =

1928 film

- Directed by: J. Steven Edwards
- Written by: R.F.W. Rees (novel); J. Steven Edwards
- Produced by: H.B. Parkinson
- Starring: David Dunbar; Cecil Barry; Lorna Duveen; Eric Hales
- Production company: H.B. Parkinson Films
- Distributed by: Pioneer Film Distributors
- Release date: 1928
- Running time: 44 minutes
- Country: United Kingdom
- Languages: Silent; English intertitles

The Second Mate is a 1928 British silent adventure film directed by J. Steven Edwards and starring David Dunbar, Cecil Barry and Lorna Duveen. It was made at Isleworth Studios as a quota quickie.

== Premise ==
A ship is rescued by the Captain's daughter.

== Cast ==
- David Dunbar as Jack Arkwright
- Cecil Barry as Captain Bywater
- Lorna Duveen as Ivy Bywater
- Eric Hales as Captain Petrie

== Bibliography ==
- Chibnall, Steve. Quota Quickies: The Birth of the British 'B' film. British Film Institute, 2007.
- Wood, Linda. British Films, 1927-1939. British Film Institute, 1986.
