= Preston England Temple =

LDS Church temple in England

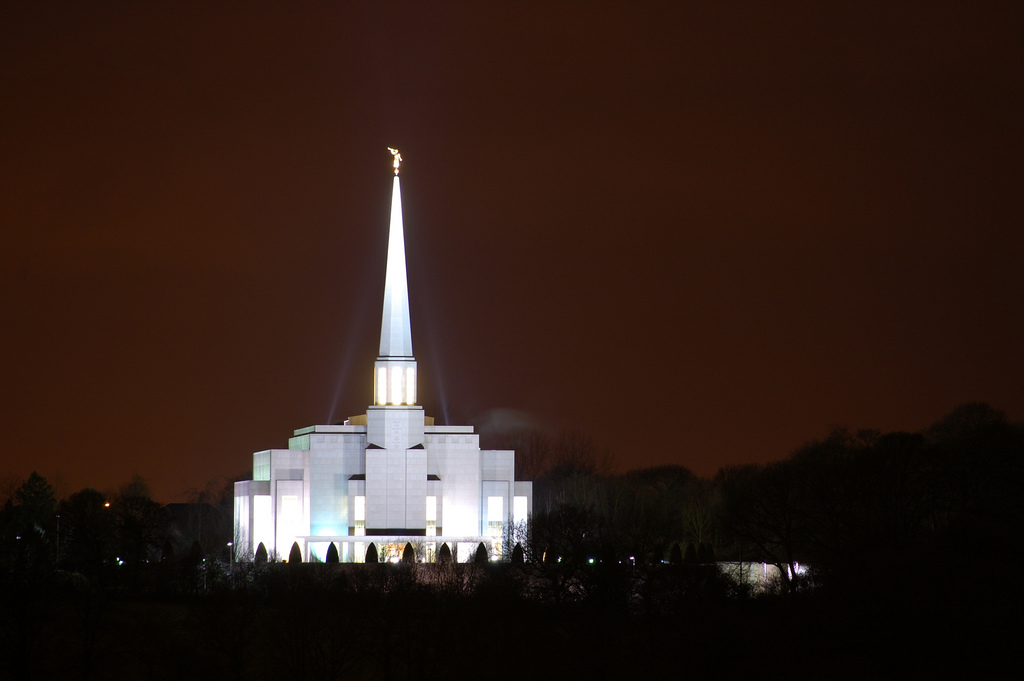
- Interactive map of Preston England Temple
- Number: 52
- Dedication: 7 June 1998, by Gordon B. Hinckley
- Site: 32 acres (13 ha)
- Floor area: 69,630 ft^{2} (6,469 m^{2})
- Height: 159 ft (48 m)
- Official website • News & images

Church chronology
← Vernal Utah Temple	Preston England Temple	→ Monticello Utah Temple

Additional information
- Announced: 19 October 1992, by Ezra Taft Benson
- Groundbreaking: 12 June 1994, by Gordon B. Hinckley
- Open house: 16–30 May 1998
- Current president: Michael Wayne Gilmore
- Designed by: Church A&E Services
- Location: Chorley, Lancashire, England
- Coordinates: 53°40′20.91360″N 2°37′52.59″W
- Exterior finish: Olympia white granite from Sardinia
- Design: Modern, single-spire design
- Baptistries: 1
- Ordinance rooms: 4 (two-stage progressive)
- Sealing rooms: 4
- Clothing rental: Yes
- Visitors' center: no

The Preston England Temple is the 52nd operating temple of the Church of Jesus Christ of Latter-day Saints (LDS Church). The temple is located in the town of Chorley, 10 miles (16 km) south of Preston, in Lancashire, England. The intent to build the temple was announced on October 19, 1992 by Gordon B. Hinckley, then serving as first counselor in the First Presidency, during the rededication of the London England Temple. It was the second temple built in Great Britain, and the sixth built in Europe.

The temple has a single spire and showcases a modern classical style. A groundbreaking ceremony, conducted by Hinckley, to signify the beginning of construction was held on June 12, 1994.

The temple serves Latter-day Saints from the Midlands and northern parts of England, the whole of Scotland, the Isle of Man, the Belfast Stake in Northern Ireland and the Dublin Stake and the Limerick District in the Republic of Ireland.

== History ==
The LDS Church took root in Preston when its first missionaries arrived in 1837. The Preston Ward is the longest continuously functioning LDS Church unit in the world.

The church's first temple in England was announced in 1953, and the London England Temple was completed and dedicated in 1958. The church saw a large increase in members in the decades after its dedication. Between 1960 and 1990, church membership in Britain multiplied over ninefold from about 16,600 to approximately 153,000. In 1990, the church announced that the London England Temple would close for remodelling in order to enhance its capacity.

In June 1990, Jeffrey R. Holland, who was serving as a seventy, was appointed as area president, and Hinckley, then serving as a counselor in the First Presidency, assigned him to seek a possible temple site in northern England.

A site on the north edge of Chorley in Lancashire, a few miles from the city of Preston, was selected, in part, because it "overlooked rolling hills to the east and a greenbelt area to the north and had easy access to the regional highway system".

Due to its place in LDS Church history and the growth of membership in Preston, during the rededication of the London England Temple, on October 19, 1992, Hinckley announced the area would be the site for Britain's second temple. The temple groundbreaking ceremony was on June 12, 1994, with Hinckley presiding. Over 10,000 people attended the groundbreaking ceremony. When construction was completed, a two-week public open house in May 1998 attracted 123,000 visitors, and members from 24 stakes volunteered.

The new temple was dedicated in 15 sessions from June 7–10, 1998, and more than 18,000 Latter-day Saints participated. The dedicatory prayer, offered by Hinckley, who was then serving as the church's president, included these words, "Bless the Saints of the United Kingdom, these wonderful people of England, Scotland, Wales, and Northern Ireland, as well as those of the Irish Republic. As they pay their tithes and offerings, wilt Thou open the windows of heaven and shower down blessings upon them."

In 2014, the European Court of Human Rights affirmed a 2008 judgement by the House of Lords who had ruled that the temple was not qualified as a "place of public religious worship" since access was restricted to this select group (church members holding a temple recommend) and this determined the LDS Church tax status.

== Design and architecture ==
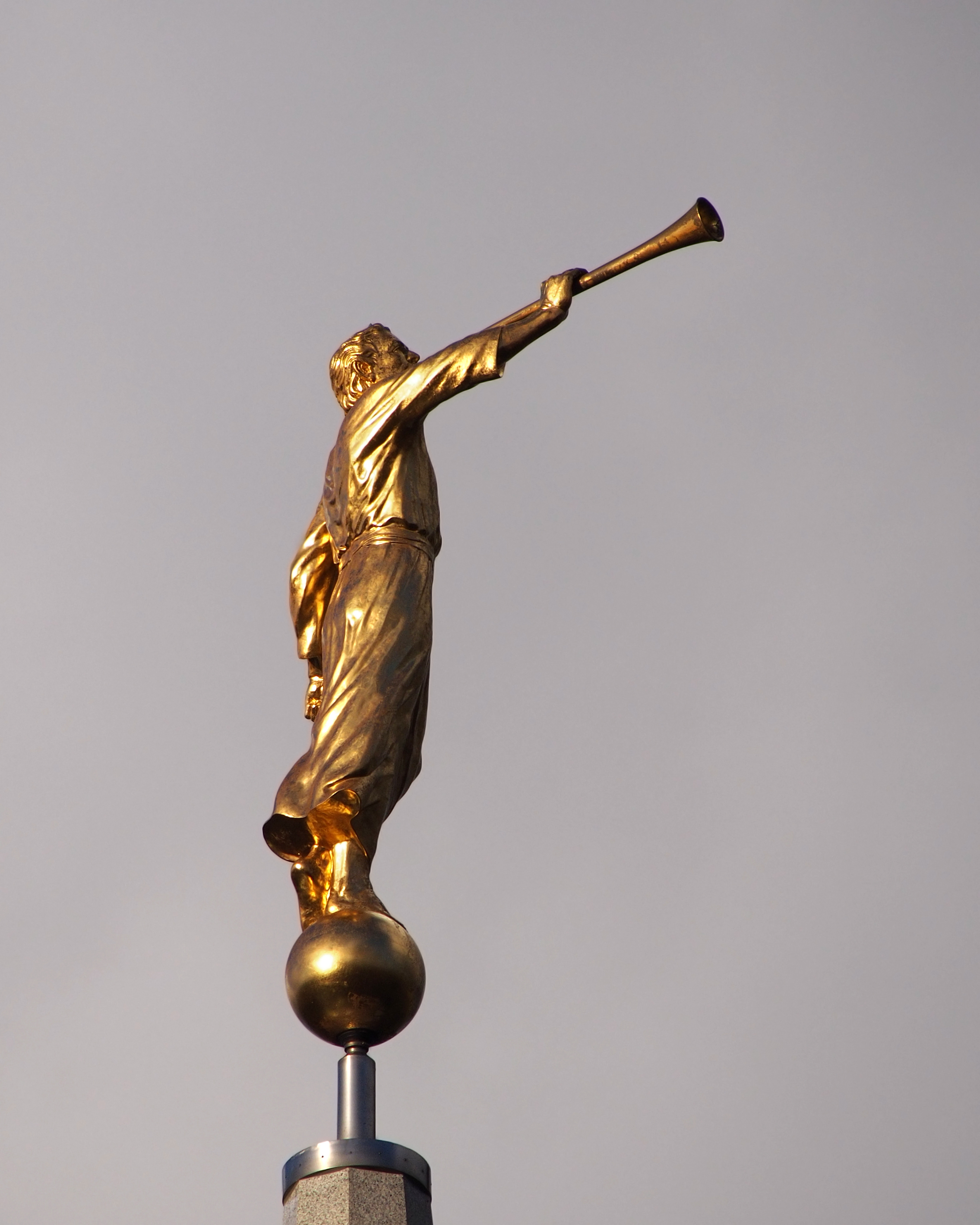
Angel Moroni atop the temple spire (2015)

The temple is the centrepiece of a 15-acre (6 hectare) complex that includes a stake centre, a missionary training centre, a family history facility, a distribution centre, temple patron housing, temple missionary accommodations, and a grounds building. The temple itself has a modern, single spire design and an exterior finish of Olympia white granite from Sardinia.

The white granite exterior and zinc roof have caused it to be described as reminiscent of England's old churches. The angel Moroni statue atop the spire is known as, "one of the landmarks of the M61". The temple has four ordinance rooms and four sealing rooms, and is the largest Latter-day Saint temple in Europe, at 69,630 square feet (6,470 m^{2}). The London England Temple is smaller, at 46,174 square feet (4,290 m^{2}).

=== Site ===
The temple sits on a 15-acre plot, and the landscaping around the temple features a small pond and large grassy areas. These elements are designed to provide a tranquil setting that enhances the site's sacred atmosphere.

=== Exterior ===
The structure stands one story tall, constructed with Olympia white granite. The exterior includes a zinc roof and single spire topped with an angel Moroni statue. The design is reflective of both the local culture and the broader church symbolism.

=== Interior ===
The interior features murals that depict the local area and paintings of Jesus Christ, centred around the celestial room, which is designed to create a spiritually uplifting environment. The temple includes four ordinance rooms, four sealing rooms, a baptistry, and the celestial room, each designed for ceremonial use. Symbolic design elements provide deeper meaning to the temple's function and aesthetics.

=== Symbols ===
With symbolism being important to church members, design using Latter-day Saint symbols provide deeper spiritual meaning to the temple's appearance and function. One of the most important symbols in the temple is the celestial room, which is meant to be a representation of heaven on earth. Another important symbol is the twelve oxen that hold up the baptismal font, which represent the Twelve Tribes of Israel.

Along with being a place of worship, the temple is also an architectural landmark in Chorley, Lancashire, representing the church's commitment to sacred and aesthetically inspiring space.

== Cultural and community impact ==
The temple and its surrounding grounds often serve as a gathering place for various community events, including the “Truth Will Prevail” Pageant. These events highlight the temple's role in creating a sense of community and promoting mutual understanding among residents of diverse backgrounds.

=== Pageant ===
In the summer of 2013, the church staged a pageant on the grounds of the temple, similar to the Hill Cumorah Pageant and others done in the United States, but with a British theme. Titled "Truth Will Prevail", it was the first official church pageant performed outside North America. The pageant script was written by Alex Mackenzie-Johns, a British Latter-day Saint, and was under the guidance of Stephen C. Kerr, a British area seventy.

The event had ticketed attendance, with seating of 1,500 per night at the "Pageant Theatre marquee". Approximately 15,000 tickets were distributed, free of charge, for the 10-day run. The pageant included 33 core cast members, 300 families cast, and a 150-voice choir. A pageant was also staged in 2023, with the topic of the first members in England. The actors included members and other people interested in giving it a go.

== Temple presidents ==
The church's temples are directed by a temple president and matron, each serving for a term of three years. The president and matron oversee the administration of temple operations and provide guidance and training for both temple patrons and staff.

The first president of the Preston England Temple was Ian D. Swanney, Anne Swanney as matron. As of 2024, Ian D. McKie and Julie C. McKie are the president and matron.

== Admittance ==
Prior to the temple’s dedication, a public open house was held from May 16-30, 1998 (excluding Sundays). Flyers were distributed to the local population in English, Hindi, and Punjabi, so that as many people as possible were informed of the open house. Nearly 10,000 people visited the temple in the first two days of the open house. After the open house, the temple was dedicated by Gordon B. Hinckley in 15 sessions from June 7-10, 1998. 18,202 church members attended the dedication.

Like all the church's temples, it is not used for Sunday worship services. To members of the church, temples are regarded as sacred houses of the Lord. Once dedicated, only church members with a current temple recommend can enter for worship.

== See also ==
- List of temples of The Church of Jesus Christ of Latter-day Saints
- List of temples of The Church of Jesus Christ of Latter-day Saints by geographic region
- The Church of Jesus Christ of Latter-day Saints in Ireland
- The Church of Jesus Christ of Latter-day Saints in Scotland
- The Church of Jesus Christ of Latter-day Saints in the Isle of Man
- The Church of Jesus Christ of Latter-day Saints in the United Kingdom
