= The Church of Jesus Christ of Latter-day Saints in the Isle of Man =

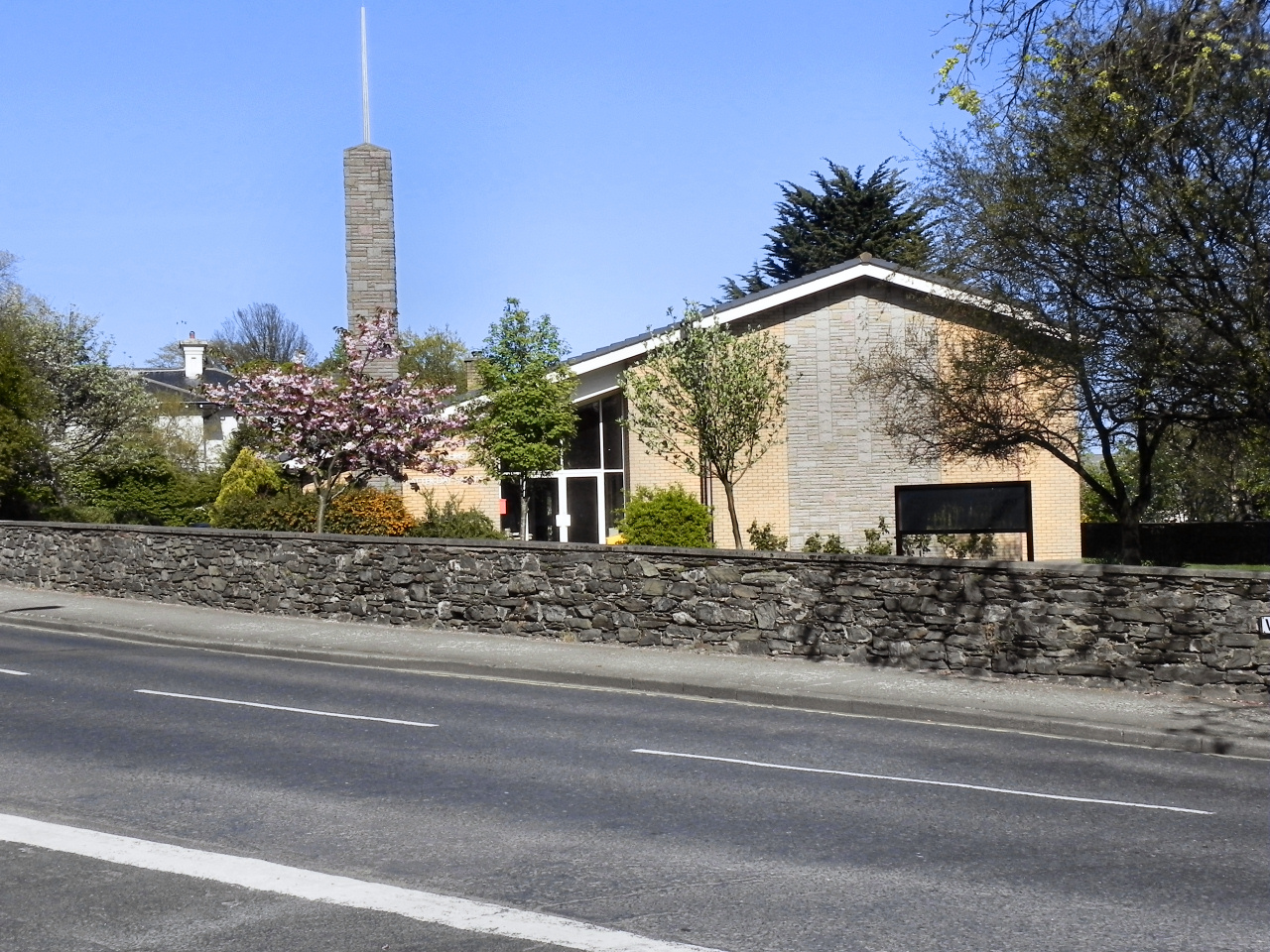
- LDS Church Building in Douglas
- Area: Europe North
- Members: 285 (2025)
- Wards: 1

Meetinghouse in the Isle of Man
Purple = Meetinghouse

The Church of Jesus Christ of Latter-day Saints in the Isle of Man refers to the Church of Jesus Christ of Latter-day Saints (LDS Church) and its members in the Isle of Man. As of 31 December 2022, The Church of Jesus Christ of Latter-day Saints reported 281 members in one congregation, the Douglas Ward, in the Isle of Man. In 2019, the Isle of Man had the 2nd most LDS Church members per capita in Europe, behind Portugal. Despite their small numbers, Manx Mormons have a heritage going back over a hundred and fifty years, which is obscured by their tendency to emigrate to the US and by the LDS Church administering the Isle of Man as part of England, when it is not actually part of the United Kingdom.

== History ==
Membership in Isle of Mann
| Year | Membership |
|---|---|
| 2007 | 283 |
| 2009 | 289 |
| 2014 | 310 |
| 2019 | 290 |
| 2025 | 285 |
*Membership was published as an estimate. Source:

The first missionaries from the Church of Jesus Christ of Latter Day Saints to proselyte in the British Isles arrived in 1837 but none reached the Isle of Man until John Taylor, Hiram Clark and William Mitchell travelled from Liverpool, England and landed at Douglas on 17 September 1840. Taylor rented the Wellington Rooms in Douglas and managed to draw large crowds to see him preach and debate with other preachers. By Christmas Day 1840 there were enough converts, 40, for the first Manx branch to be formed.

The missionaries were known as "dippers" from their full-immersion baptism. A poem, The Mormonites' Address to the Manxies was published in Mona's Herald in April 1841 satirising them:

Hear, oh, ye undipt wretches, hear,

If ye in glory would appear, -

If ye be saved, ye must revere
The saints of the Missouri.

By July 1856 emigration to the Salt Lake area of Utah had so depleted the conference overseeing the island that it was closed and merged with the Liverpool conference in England. At the same time opposition to Latter-day Saints on the island was intensifying and, in August 1857, two missionaries trying to deliver lectures on the Book of Mormon had to close the meeting due to a large crowd threatening violence who proceeded to follow them back to their lodgings.

When John Caine, a native of the Isle of Man who had emigrated to Utah in the 1850s, came to the island as missionary in 1875 he could only find 3 church members on the whole island.

Beginning in the 1950s emigration to the United States began to be discouraged and local congregations began to proliferate.

There is currently one chapel and one ward on the Isle of Man, based in suburban Douglas.

== Missions ==
The nation of the Isle of Man does not have its own mission and is served by an English mission instead.

Four of the five British Isles missions are based in England.

== Temples ==
There are no LDS temples on the Isle of Man and it is served by the Preston England Temple.

| 52. Preston England Temple; Official website; News & images | |
| Location: Announced: Groundbreaking: Dedicated: Size: Style: | Chorley, Lancashire, England; 19 October 1992 by Ezra Taft Benson; 12 June 1994 by Gordon B. Hinckley; 7 June 1998 by Gordon B. Hinckley; 69,630 sq ft (6,469 m^{2}) on a 32-acre (13 ha) site Modern, single-spire design - designed by Church A&E Services |

== Notable Manx Latter-day Saints ==
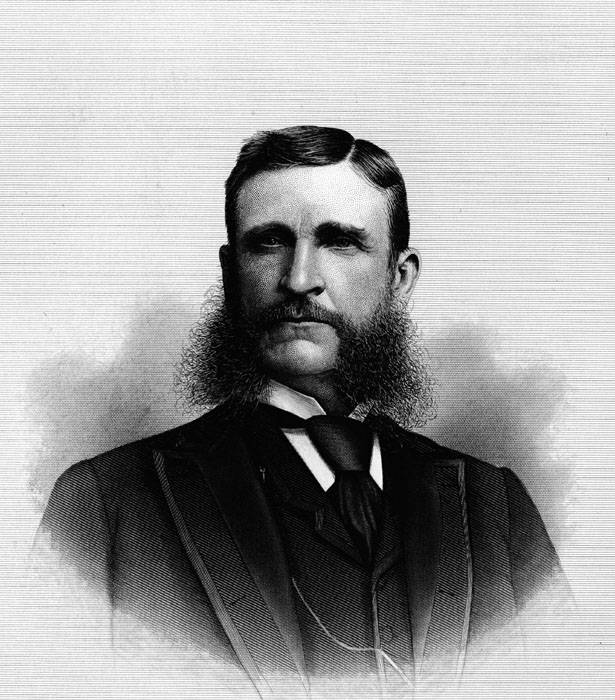
John Thomas Caine

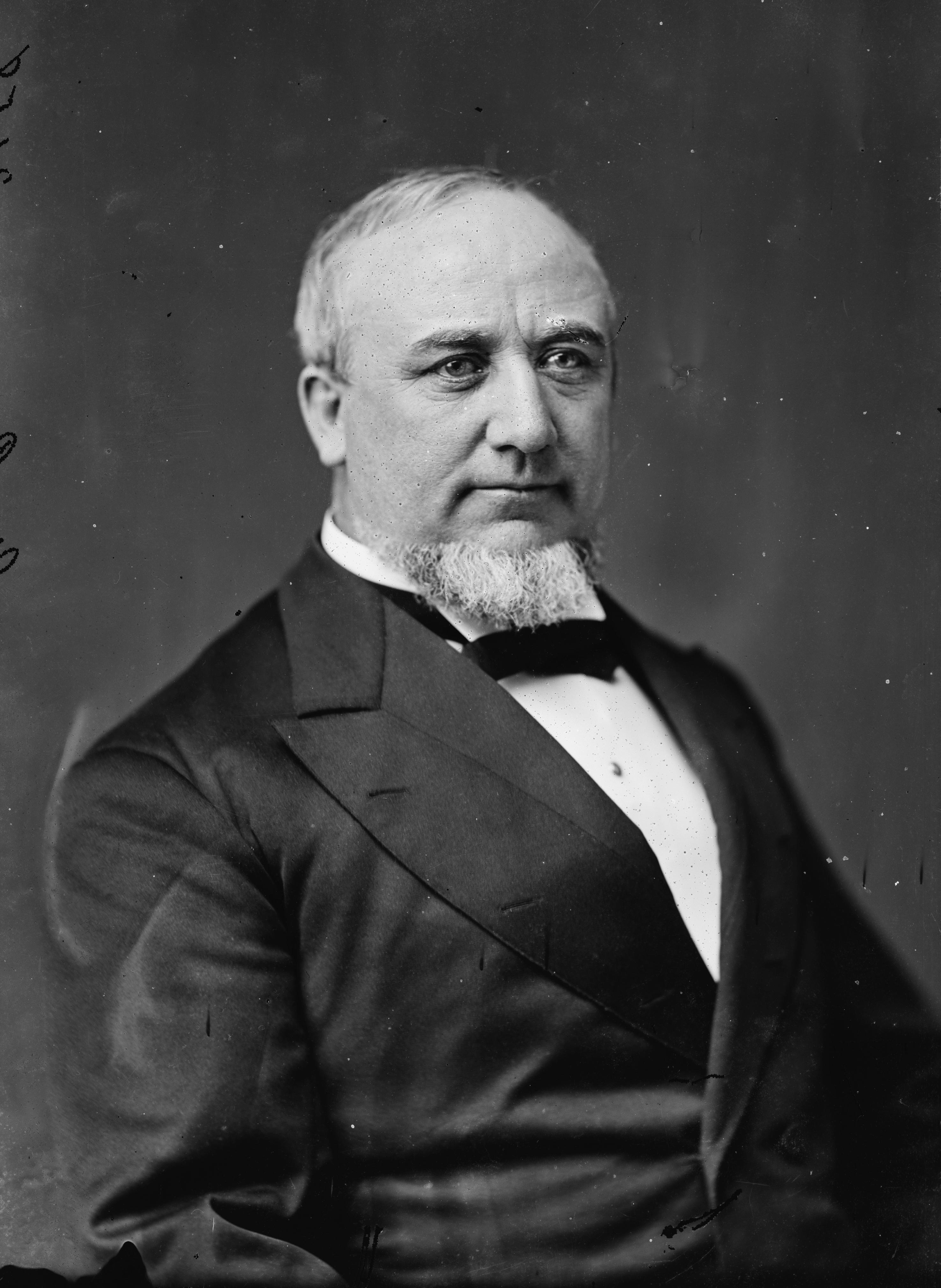
"Cannon, Hon. Geo. Q. of Utah" c. 1873-1881, from Brady-Handy Collection, Library of Congress. He was of Manx parentage

- John Thomas Caine (January 8, 1829 – September 20, 1911), was a delegate to the United States House of Representatives who was born in the parish of Patrick and attended the common schools in Douglas.
- The Cannon family is a prominent U.S. political family in the states of Utah, Nevada and Idaho which descends from the 19th-century marriage of George Cannon and Ann Quayle before their emigration from Peel, Isle of Man. The family's most notable member was their oldest son George Quayle Cannon. The family is connected by marriage to the Bennion, Taylor, Wells and Young political families.

== Sources ==
- Evans, Richard L. (1984) [1937], A Century of "Mormonism" in Great Britain, Salt Lake City: Publishers Press, ISBN 978-0916095079, OCLC 866138200
- Rasmussen, Matthew L. (2016) [2016]. Mormonism and the Making of a British Zion. Salt Lake City: University of Utah Press. ISBN 978-1607814870. OCLC 975271934.
