= Winifred Graham =

English novelist and anti-Mormon activist

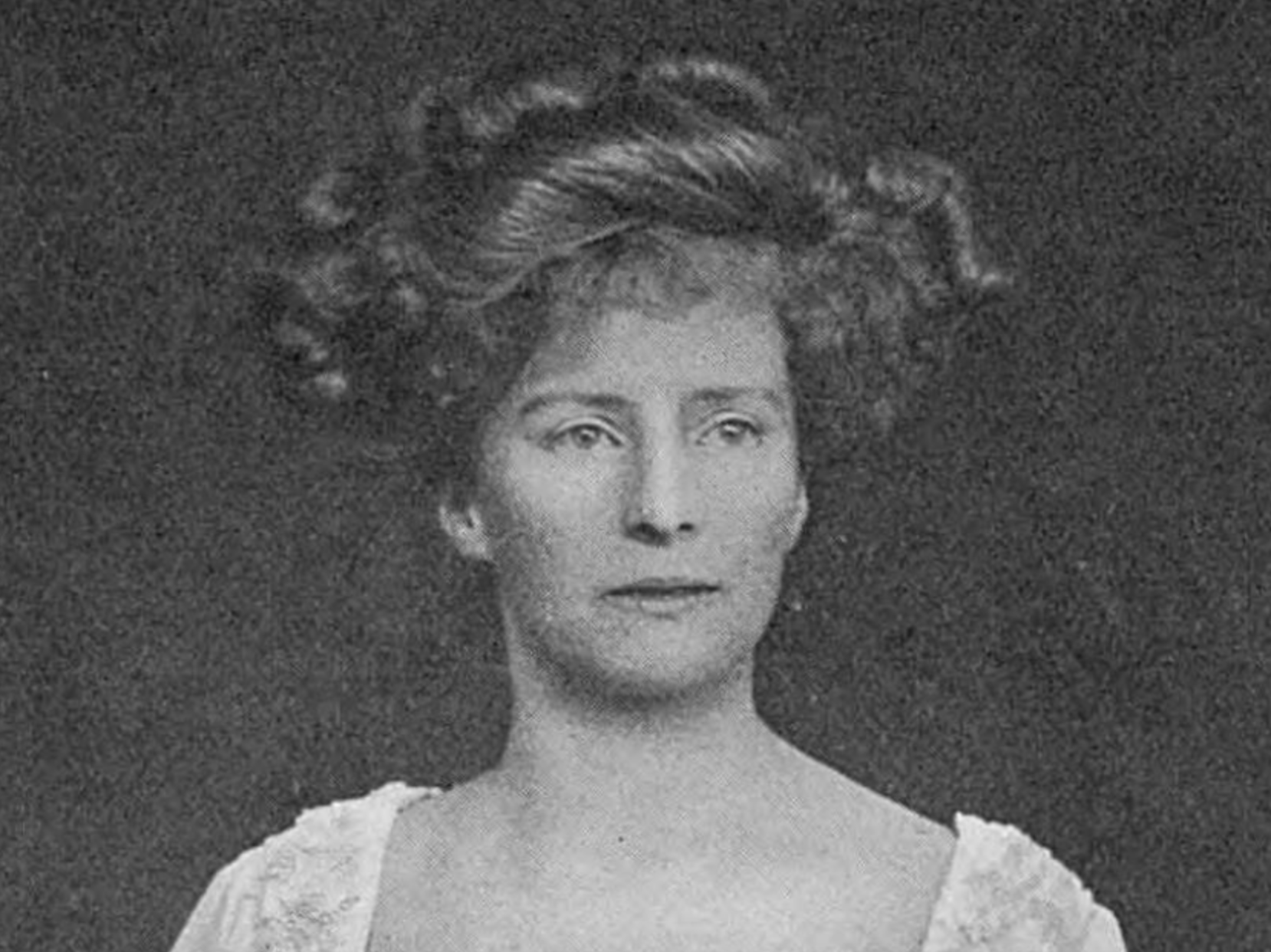
- Born: Matilda Winifred Muriel Graham; 21 April 1873; London
- Died: 5 February 1950 (aged 76); Hampton-on-Thames, Middlesex
- Other names: Mrs Theodore Cory
- Occupations: Novelist, writer
- Known for: Anti-Mormon activism
- Father: Robert George Graham

Winifred Graham (born London 21 April 1873; died Hampton-on-Thames 5 February 1950) was an English novelist and anti-Mormon activist.

== Childhood ==
Matilda Winifred Muriel Graham was born on 21 April 1873 in South Kensington, London. She was baptized in Barnes in June of that year. The daughter of Robert Graham, a wealthy stockbroker, she enjoyed a privileged upbringing in Hampton-on-Thames, displaying literary and dramatic talent from an early age.

== Career ==
Graham's career as an author began in the 1890s. Her short story "Through the Multitude of Business", published in the summer 1894 issue of Belgravia magazine, described the revenge of a beautiful heiress on a man who had taken advantage of her. Her first book-length novel, On the Down Grade, was published in 1896.

Graham was a prolific writer, producing eighty-eight books during her lifetime, as well as several short stories published in newspapers and magazines. In addition to the romantic novels and thrillers which constituted the vast majority of her output, she also wrote a highly critical popular history of Mormonism, two volumes supposedly communicated by her father after his death via automatic writing, and a three-volume autobiography.

Between 1908 and 1924, Graham led a campaign to ban Mormon missionaries from the United Kingdom. Her novel The Love Story of a Mormon (1911) was adapted into the silent film Trapped by the Mormons (1922).

In addition to her criticisms of Mormonism, Graham also published works critical of Zionism (The Zionists), Christian Science (Christian Murderers), Roman Catholicism (Mary), and the women's suffrage movement (The Enemy of Woman).

== Family ==
In 1906, Graham married Theodore Cory, wealthy son of a Welsh mine-owner. She continued to use the name "Winifred Graham" professionally, but was known as "Mrs Theodore Cory" in other contexts. She died in 1950 after an illness of several months, and was survived by her husband Theodore. They had no children.

== Books ==
- Graham, Winifred (1896). On the Down Grade. London: Chapman & Co.
- Graham, Winifred (1896). A Strange Solution. London: Chapman & Co.
  - Reprinted in 1914 by C. Arthur Pearson
- Graham, Winifred (1896). When the Birds Begin to Sing. London: C. A. Pearson.
- Graham, Winifred (1898). Meresia. London: Hurst & Blackett.
- Graham, Winifred (1896). The Star Child. London: Hurst & Blackett.
- Graham, Winifred (1898). The Great House of Castleton, and Patricia. London: C. Arthur Pearson.
- Graham, Winifred (1900). The Beautiful Mrs Leach. London: Ward, Lock, & Co.
- Graham, Winifred (1901). Beautiful Mamma, and other stories. London: George Newnes.
- Graham, Winifred (1901). A Social Pretender. London: John Long.
- Graham, Winifred (1902). A Child at the Helm. London: George Newnes.
- Graham, Winifred (1902). The Zionists. London: Hutchinson & Co.
- Graham, Winifred (1904). Angels, and Devils, and Man. London: Cassell & Co.
- Graham, Winifred (1905). Wickedness in High Places. London: F. V. White & Co.
- Graham, Winifred (1905). The Vision at the Savoy. London: F. V. White & Co.
  - Reprinted in 1905 by Fleming H. Revell
- Graham, Winifred (1906). Emma Hamilton's Miniature. London: F. V. White & Co.
- Graham, Winifred (1907). World Without End. London: Alston Rivers. hdl:2027/coo1.ark:/13960/t7sn0r536.
- Graham, Winifred (1908). Christian Murderers. London: Everett & Co.
  - Reprinted under the title Child of the Wilderness in 1910
- Graham, Winifred (1908). Ezra the Mormon. London: Everett & Co.
- Graham, Winifred (1909). Mayfair. London: Greening & Co.
- Graham, Winifred (1909). A Miracle of the Turf. London: Greening & Co.
- Graham, Winifred (1909). Mary. London: Mills & Boon.
  - Reprinted by Mitchell Kennerley, New York, 1910
- Graham, Winifred (1910). The Enemy of Woman. London: Mills & Boon.
  - Reprinted in 1914 by Mitchell and Kennerley, New York
- Graham, Winifred (1911). The Love Story of a Mormon. London: Mills & Boon.
- Graham, Winifred (1911). The Needlewoman. London: Mills & Boon.
- Graham, Winifred (1912). The Gods of the Dead. London: William Rider & Son.
- Graham, Winifred (1912). Sons of State. London: Mills & Boon.
- Graham, Winifred (1912). The Sin of Utah. London: Everett & Co.
- Graham, Winifred (1912). Her Husband's Secret. London: C. Arthur Pearson.
- Graham, Winifred (1913). The Pit of Corruption. London: Stanley Paul & Co.
  - New and revised edition published by Hutchinson & Co., 1934
- Graham, Winifred (1913). The Mormons: a Popular History, from Earliest Times to the Present Day. London: Hurst and Blackett.
- Graham, Winifred (1915). The Imperial Malefactor. London: T. W. Laurie.
- Graham, Winifred (1916). Crossroads. London.
- Graham, Winifred (1916). Judas of Salt Lake. London: Eveleigh Nash & Co.
- Graham, Winifred (1917). Spectres of the Past. London.
- Graham, Winifred (1919). Falling Waters. London: Hutchinson & Co.
- Graham, Winifred (1921). The Daughter Terrible. London: Hutchinson & Co.
- Graham, Winifred (1921). Breakers on the Sand. London: Hutchinson & Co.
- Graham, Winifred (1922). John Edgar's Angels. London: Hutchinson & Co.
- Graham, Winifred (1922). Sealed Women. London: Hutchinson & Co.
- Graham, Winifred (1923). And It Was So. London: Hutchinson & Co.
- Graham, Winifred (1923). My Letters from Heaven: Being Messages from the Unseen World Given in Automatic Writing to Winifred Graham by Her Father, Robert George Graham. London: Hutchinson & Co.
- Graham, Winifred (1923). The Highway of God: Notes of Twenty-Four Lessons for Adolescents. London: Sunday School Institute.
- Graham, Winifred (1924). Ninety and Nine Just Persons. London: Hutchinson & Co.
- Graham, Winifred (1924). Eve and the Elders. London: Hutchinson & Co.
- Graham, Winifred (1925). In Fear of a Woman. London: Hutchinson & Co.
- Graham, Winifred (1925). The Night Adventures of Alexis. London: Faber & Gwyer.
- Graham, Winifred (1926). The Diamond Heels. London: Hutchinson & Co.
- Graham, Winifred (1926). A Sinner in a Surplice. London: Hutchinson & Co.
- Graham, Winifred (1927). Fame and Shame. London: Hutchinson & Co.
- Graham, Winifred (1927). Unholy Matrimony. London: Hutchinson & Co.
- Graham, Winifred (1927). More Letters from Heaven: Being Messages from the Unseen World Given in Automatic Writing to Winifred Graham by Her Father, Robert George Graham. London: Hutchinson & Co.
- Graham, Winifred (1928). After Hell. London: Hutchinson & Co.
- Graham, Winifred (1928). Till Divorce Us Do Part. London: Hutchinson & Co.
- Graham, Winifred (1929). Tumbling Out of Windows. London: Hutchinson & Co.
- Graham, Winifred (1929). Consummated. London: Hutchinson & Co.
- Graham, Winifred (1930). The Last Laugh. London: Hutchinson & Co.
- Graham, Winifred (1930). A Wolf of the Evenings. London: Hutchinson & Co.
- Graham, Winifred (1931). Wolf-Net. London: Hutchinson & Co.
- Graham, Winifred (1931). The Power Behind the Throne. London: Hutchinson & Co.
- Graham, Winifred (1932). Vacant Possession. London: Ernest Benn.
- Graham, Winifred (1932). The Life of a Nobody. London: Hutchinson & Co.
- Graham, Winifred (1933). Slightly Imperfect. London: Ernest Benn.
- Graham, Winifred (1933). Experimental Child. London: Hutchinson & Co.
- Graham, Winifred (1933). Identity. London: Hutchinson & Co.
- Graham, Winifred (1933). In the Toils of the Mormons. London: Mellifont Press.
- Graham, Winifred (1934). Tongues in Trees. London: Hutchinson & Co.
- Graham, Winifred (1935). Hallowmas Abbey. London: Hutchinson & Co.
- Graham, Winifred (1935). The Man Behind the Chair. London: Hutchinson & Co.
- Graham, Winifred (1936). Ghostly Strength. London: Hutchinson & Co.
- Graham, Winifred (1936). What Thinkest Thou, Simon?. London: Hutchinson & Co.
- Graham, Winifred (1937). Dr. Julian. London: Hutchinson & Co.
- Graham, Winifred (1937). The Wise Man Hath Said. London: Hutchinson & Co.
- Graham, Winifred (1938). Glenvirgin's Ghost. London: Hutchinson & Co.
- Graham, Winifred (1938). The Frozen Death. London: Hutchinson & Co.
- Graham, Winifred (1939). All Fires Go Out. London: Hutchinson & Co.
- Graham, Winifred (1940). Sacrifice & Co. London: Hutchinson & Co.
- Graham, Winifred (1941). The River of Thought. London: Hutchinson & Co.
- Graham, Winifred (1942). Christopher Carol. London: Hutchinson & Co.
- Graham, Winifred (1944). A Spider Never Falls. London: Hutchinson & Co.
- Graham, Winifred (1945). What Next?. London: Hutchinson & Co.
- Graham, Winifred (1945). That Reminds Me. London: Skeffington & Son.
- Graham, Winifred (1947). Observations, Casual and Intimate: Being the Second Volume of "That Reminds Me". London: Skeffington & Son.
- Graham, Winifred (1948). I Introduce. Being the companion volume of "That Reminds Me" and "Observations", the Trinity of an Autobiography. London: Skeffington & Son.

== Short stories, etc., first published in periodicals ==
- Graham, Winifred (1894). "Through the Multitude of Business". Belgravia. lxxxiv (Holiday number). London: F. W. White: 52–74. hdl:2027/inu.30000080763760.
- Graham, Winifred (1895). "Once Loved". Belgravia. lxxxvi. London: F. W. White: 34. hdl:2027/njp.32101065270629.
- Graham, Winifred (1896). "A Heroine in Bib and Tucker". Pearson's Magazine. i. London: C. Arthur Pearson: 452–459. hdl:2027/inu.30000093231268. (republished in Beautiful Mamma and Other Stories)
- Graham, Winifred (1897). "A Modern Martyr". The English Illustrated Magazine. xvi (160). London: Illustrated London News: 467–472. hdl:2027/mdp.39015056059861.
- Graham, Winifred (1900). "The Fairy with the Grey Beard". The Strand. xix. London: George Newnes: 689–695. (republished in Beautiful Mamma and Other Stories)
- Graham, Winifred (1900). "In Painted Muslin". The Strand. xx (118). London: George Newnes: 401–409.
- Graham, Winifred (1900). "Hidden in China". The Strand. xx (120). London: George Newnes: 741–747. (republished in Beautiful Mamma and Other Stories)
- Graham, Winifred (1900). "The Other Miss Seabroke". The English Illustrated Magazine. xxiii. London: Ingram Brothers: 282–288.
- Graham, Winifred (1901). "There were Giants in Those Days". The Strand. xxii (127). London: George Newnes: 86–93. (republished in Beautiful Mamma and Other Stories)
- Graham, Winifred (1901). "Beautiful Mamma". The Strand. xxii (129). London: George Newnes: 312–317. (republished in Beautiful Mamma and Other Stories)
- Graham, Winifred (1902). "A New Year's Gift". The Strand. xxiii (133). London: George Newnes: 24–31.
- Graham, Winifred (1904). "Diamond Darling". The Strand. xxviii (168). London: George Newnes: 745–750.
- Graham, Winifred (1905). "Story-Telling". The Strand. xxix (174). London: George Newnes: 679–684.
- Graham, Winifred (1905). "Portrait of a Spanish Lady". The Strand. xxx (179). London: George Newnes: 541–545.
- Graham, Winifred (1907). "The Stranger's Room". The Strand. xxxiv (201). London: George Newnes: 323–328.
- Graham, Winifred (1909). "King of the Castle". The Strand. xxxviii (225). London: George Newnes: 328–334.
- Graham, Winifred (1911). "Boaz Tucker's Miracle". The Strand. xliii (247). London: George Newnes: 174–180.

== Stories serialized in periodicals ==
- Through the Valley (1895) (serialized in Pearson's Story Teller)
- Six First-Class Passengers (1895) (serialized in Pearson's Weekly)
- Closer than a Brother (1896) (serialized in Home Notes)
- Pauper Blue Blood (1896) (serialized in Short Stories)

Can A man be True (1906) serialized in 'Adventure Magazine', vol 1
