= London England Temple =

Church in Surrey, England

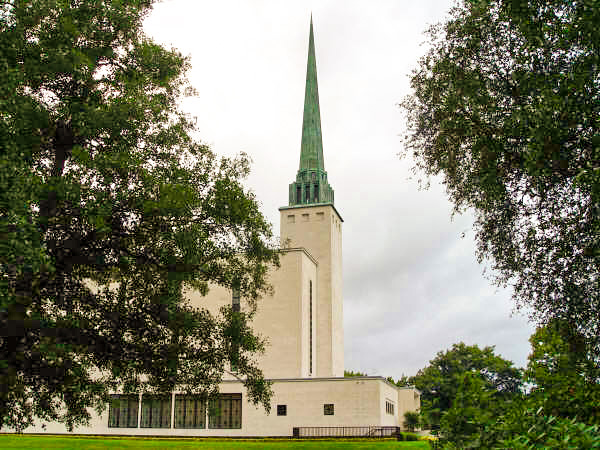
- Interactive map of London England Temple
- Number: 12
- Dedication: 7 September 1958, by David O. McKay
- Site: 32 acres (13 ha)
- Floor area: 42,652 ft^{2} (3,962.5 m^{2})
- Height: 190 ft (58 m)
- Official website • News & images

Church chronology
← Hamilton New Zealand Temple	London England Temple	→ Oakland California Temple

Additional information
- Announced: 17 February 1955, by David O. McKay
- Groundbreaking: 27 August 1955, by David O. McKay
- Open house: 16 August – 3 September 1958; 8–14 October 1992
- Rededicated: 18 October 1992, by Gordon B. Hinckley
- Current president: Julian Jones
- Designed by: Edward O. Anderson
- Location: Newchapel, Surrey, England
- Coordinates: 51°9′45.23759″N 0°3′7.851599″W
- Exterior finish: brick masonry faced with white Portland limestone; the spire is lead-coated copper
- Design: Modern contemporary, single spire
- Baptistries: 1
- Ordinance rooms: 4 (stationary)
- Sealing rooms: 7
- Clothing rental: Yes
- Visitors' center: Yes

The London England Temple (formerly the London Temple) is the twelfth operating temple of the Church of Jesus Christ of Latter-day Saints (LDS Church) and is located in Newchapel, Surrey, England. The temple serves church members in southern and central England, and south Wales. Despite its name, it is not located in London or Greater London.

The intent to build the temple was announced on 10 August 1953, by the church's First Presidency. A groundbreaking ceremony, to signify the beginning of construction, was held on 27 August 1955, conducted by church president David O. McKay.

== History ==
The site of the original 34,000 square foot building, located twenty-five miles south of London, was selected in 1952 by McKay and Stayner Richards. The 10-acre site was announced on 10 August 1953, by McKay. The preliminary plans called for a three-story structure with a perforated aluminum spire, similar to the Oakland California Temple.

A groundbreaking ceremony on 27 August 1955, presided over by McKay, signified the commencement of construction. The temple was then dedicated on 7 September 1958. Over 76,000 people toured the building during the public open house before its dedication. It was the church's first temple built in the United Kingdom. Its construction was part of a growth in the number of temples, led by McKay, who performed the dedication.

After thirty-two years, the temple was closed in 1990 for remodeling and refurbishing. An additional 8,500 square feet (790 m^{2}) were added, as well as a fourth floor. In October 1992, Gordon B. Hinckley rededicated the London England Temple, after a two-week public open house. A second British temple was built in 1998 in Chorley, Lancashire.

A statue of the angel Moroni was placed atop the temple at the conclusion of the Jubilee Celebration. Included in the Jubilee project was the restoring the Manor House and the visitors' center, adding new mission offices to the temple site and renovating the accommodation center for temple patrons.

In 2020, like all the church's other temples, the London England Temple was closed for a time in response to the coronavirus pandemic.

== Design and architecture ==
The 42,775-square-foot (3,974 m^{2}) temple is constructed of concrete and steel, with brick walls faced with white Portland stone. The 165 ft (50 m) spire is sheathed in copper and the building includes a baptistry, four instruction rooms and eight sealing rooms. Like others of the church's temples, a temple recommend is required for church members to enter. Surrounding the temple is a forty-room mansion, named the Manor House, ten acres of formal grounds, and a large pond.

The building has a modern-contemporary style, coupled with a traditional Latter-day Saint temple design. Designed by Edward O. Anderson, the temple’s architecture reflects both the cultural heritage of Surrey County.

Site

The temple sits on a 10-acre plot, and the landscaping around the temple features large trees, flowers, shrubbery, and a large pond with a walking path that leads to the front doors of the temple. Notably, the site features several oak trees so old that in 1958 a local paper claimed that they had been planted before 1492 and discovery of the Americas by Christopher Columbus. These landscaping elements are designed to provide a tranquil setting that enhances the sacred atmosphere of the site.

Exterior

The structure stands four stories tall, constructed with white Portland stone. The exterior is characterized by a copper-plated spire and a statue of the angel Moroni, each chosen for their symbolic significance and alignment with temple traditions. The design incorporates elements that are reflective of both the local culture and broader church symbolism.

Interior

The interior features chandeliers and cream-colored carpet, centered around the celestial room, which is decorated in a French Second Empire style and features a ceiling painted with images of the sky. The temple includes a baptistry, four endowment rooms, and eight sealing rooms, each purposefully arranged for ceremonial use. Symbolic elements are integrated into the design, providing deeper meaning to the temple's function and aesthetics.

Symbols

The design includes symbolic elements representing Latter-Day Saint symbols and symbols from the Bible, both of which provide deeper spiritual meaning to the temple's appearance and function. Symbolism is an important subject to members of the church. One of the most important symbols is the celestial room, which is meant to represent heaven on earth through its beautiful interior decoration and peaceful atmosphere.

The temple is both a place of worship and an architectural landmark in Surrey, consistent with the church's commitment to creating sacred and aesthetically inspiring spaces.

== Renovations ==
Over the years, the London England Temple has undergone several renovations to preserve its structural integrity, update facilities, and enhance its spiritual and aesthetic appeal. The most significant renovation project commenced in 1990.

The renovations focused on enlarging the building’s capacity. A fourth floor was added and a single large ordinance room was converted into four smaller endowment rooms. Four more sealing rooms were also added. The renovations accommodated the church's growing needs. In addition to increasing the capacity of the temple, the changes also made scheduling more convenient. The renovation also included the complete interior redecoration.

The renovated London England Temple was rededicated in ten sessions from 18-20 October 1992, by Gordon B. Hinckley.

Additional renovations and updates to the temple site took place as part of the Jubilee Celebration of the London Temple, which took place in 2008 to commemorate its 50 years of use. As part of the Jubilee project, the Manor House and the visitors’ center were restored, new mission offices were added to temple grounds, and the accommodation center for temple patrons was updated. Additionally, on 15 December 2008, fifty years after the first dedication of the temple, an angel Moroni statue was added to the temple’s spire.

== Cultural and community impact ==
When the London England Temple was announced in 1953, it had an enormous impact on the Latter-day Saint community in Great Britain. The announcement led to a surge in genealogical research among British church members as they prepared for the temple, and church members repeatedly demonstrated their willingness to fund its construction and maintenance, through both fundraising drives and regular tithing contributions. The temple is both an indicator of the faith of church members and a symbol of the future of the church in England.

The temple also draws in non-members, even outside of the open houses. Throughout the years, many visitors have gone to spend time in the gardens on the temple grounds, which were once featured in the English guidebook The Gardens of England and Wales.

== Temple presidents ==
Since its dedication in 1958, the temple has been overseen by a series of temple presidents and matrons, who typically serve for a term of three years. The temple president and matron have stewardship for the administration of its operations and provide spiritual guidance for temple patrons and staff.

The first temple president was Selvoy Jarrett Boyer, with Mary Gladys Sessions Boyer as matron. They served from 1958-1964. As of 2024, Roderick K. Anatsui and Josephine A. Anatsui are the president and matron.

== Admittance ==
Prior to the temple’s first dedication, a public open house was held from 16 August – 3 September 1958 (excluding Sundays). During the open house, between 75,000 and 80,000 people visited the temple. The temple was dedicated from 7-9 September 1958, by David O. McKay.

When the temple reopened after its 1990-1992 renovation period, an open house was held from 8-14 October 1992. Following the open house, the temple was rededicated in 10 sessions from 18-20 October 1992, by Gordon B. Hinckley. Approximately 13,100 church members attended the rededication ceremonies.

Like all the church's temples, it is not used for Sunday worship services. To members of the church, temples are regarded as sacred houses of the Lord. Once dedicated, only church members with a current temple recommend can enter for worship.

== See also ==
- Comparison of temples of The Church of Jesus Christ of Latter-day Saints
- List of temples of The Church of Jesus Christ of Latter-day Saints
- List of temples of The Church of Jesus Christ of Latter-day Saints by geographic region
- List of places of worship in Tandridge (district)
- Temple architecture (Latter-day Saints)

== Gallery ==
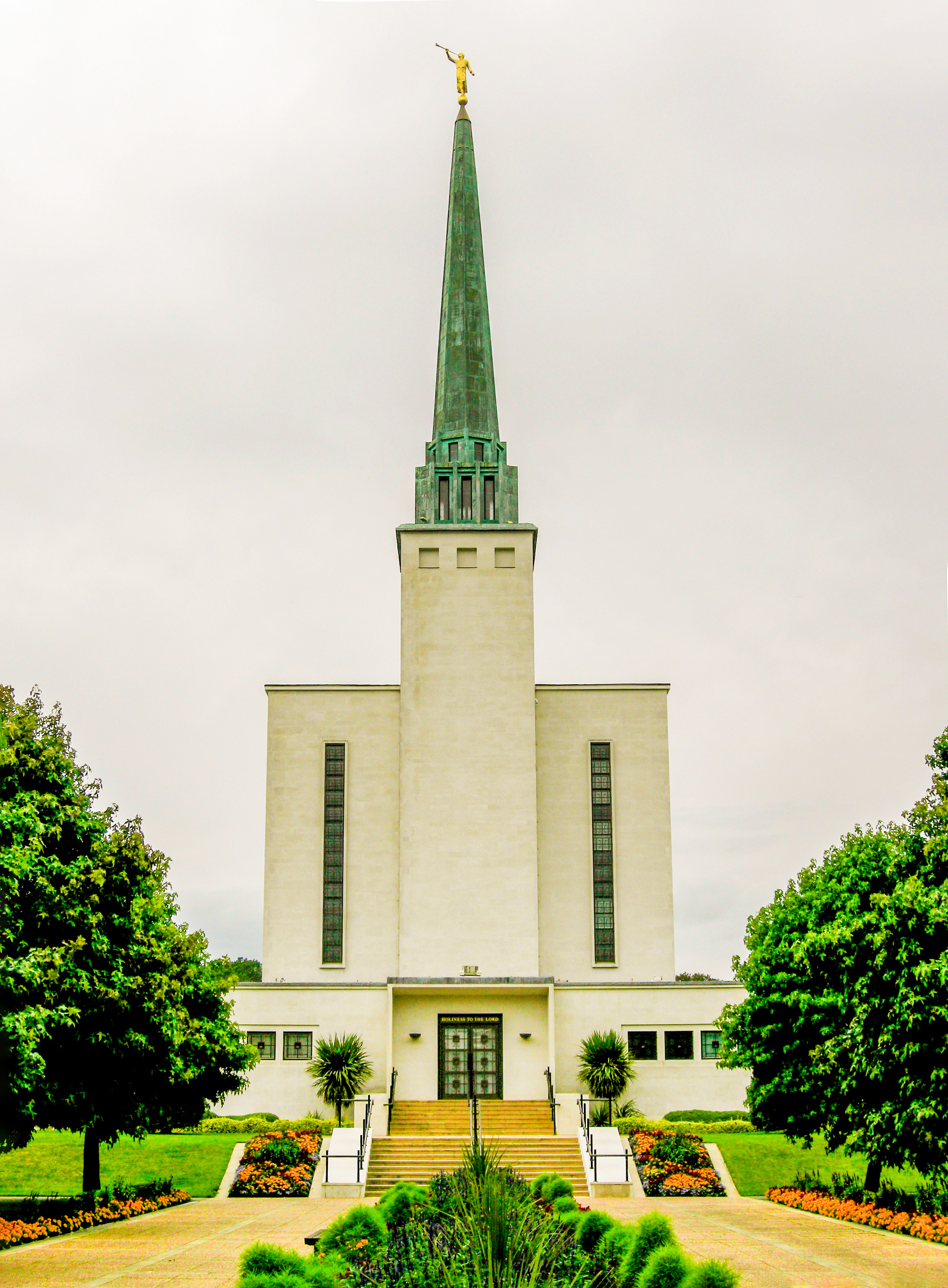
View of temple from front gate

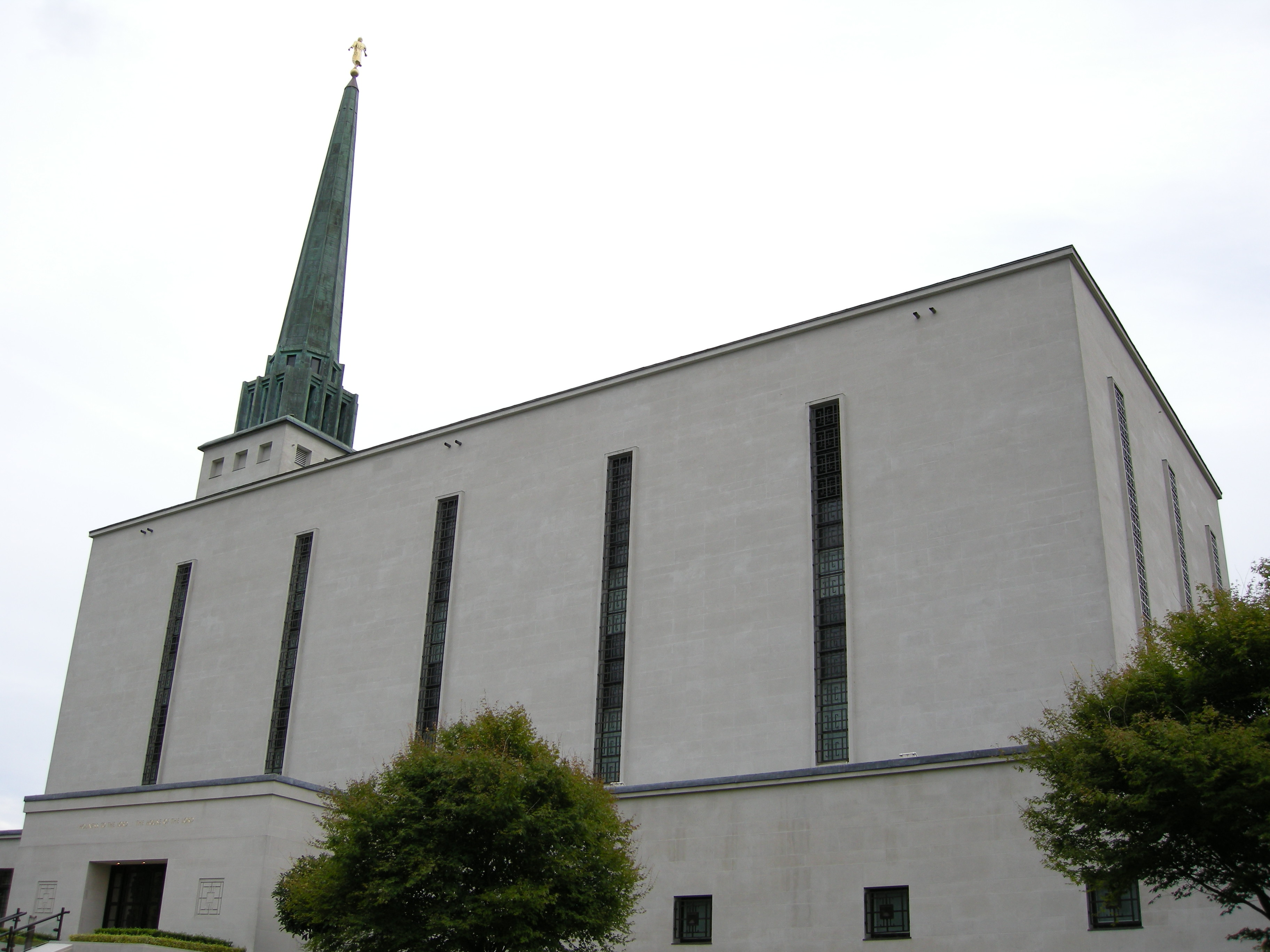
Side view of temple

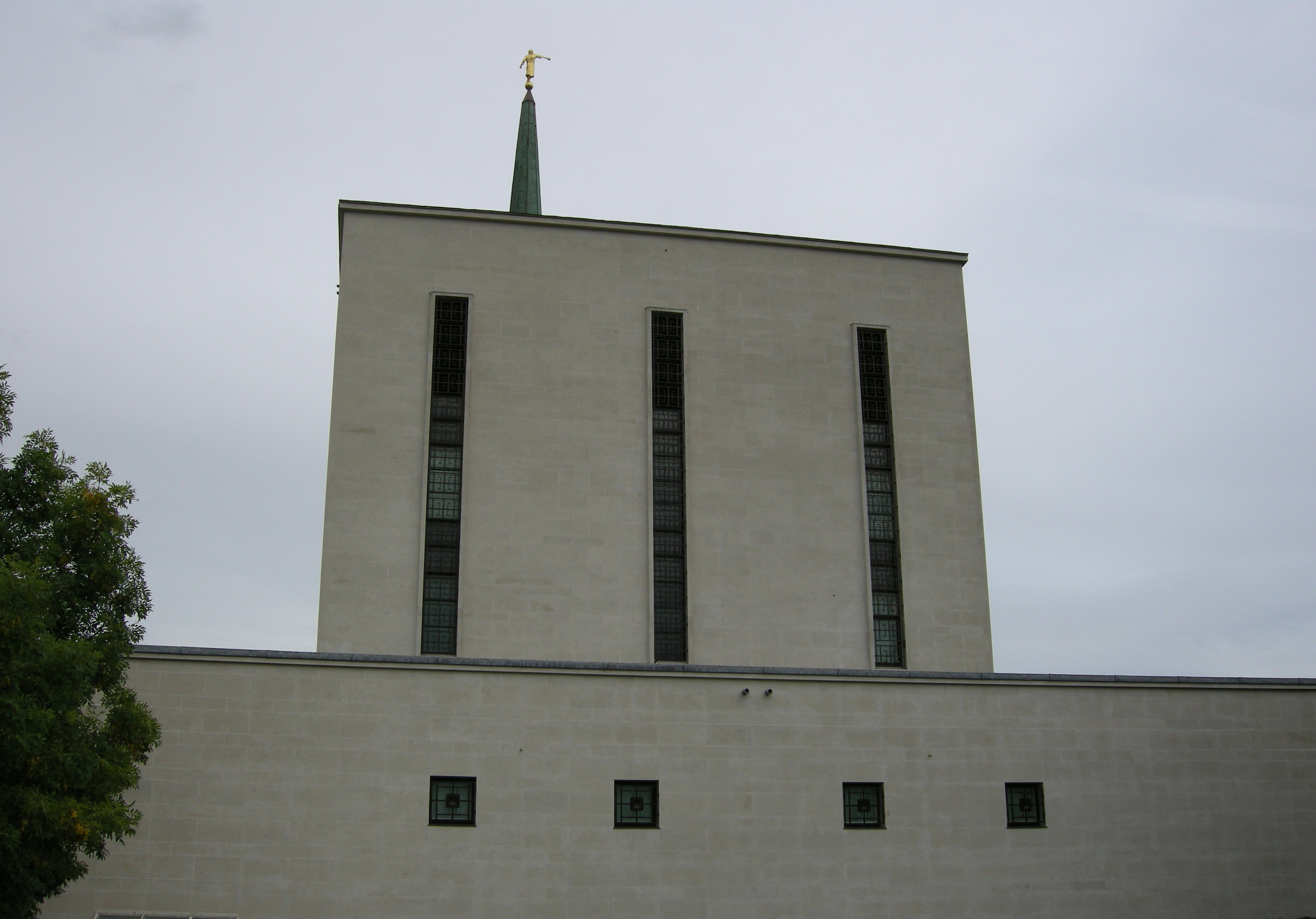
Back view of temple

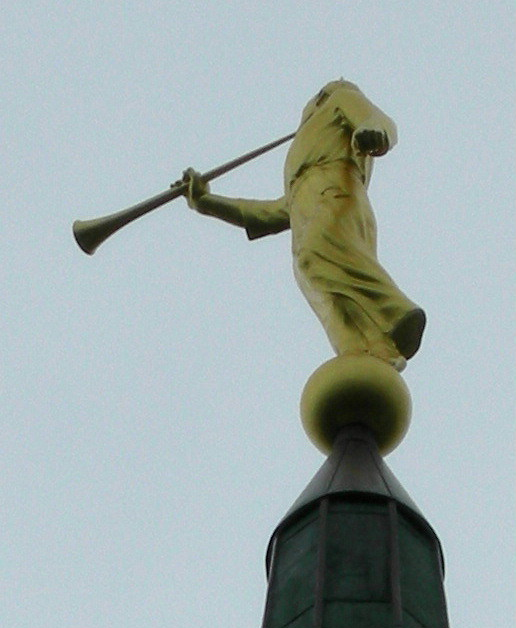
Angel Moroni statue on spire
