= Trapped by the Mormons =

1922 film

- Directed by: H. B. Parkinson
- Written by: Winifred Graham
- Produced by: H. B. Parkinson
- Starring: Evelyn Brent
- Release date: March 1922
- Running time: 97 minutes
- Country: United Kingdom
- Language: Silent

Trapped by the Mormons (also released as The Mormon Peril) is a 1922 silent British drama film directed by H. B. Parkinson and starring Evelyn Brent. This anti-Mormon film involves the taking of young virginal English women to Utah to become wives. The film survives in several archives, and a copy of the film has been released on video.

== Cast ==
- Evelyn Brent as Nora Prescott
- Louis Willoughby as Isoldi Keene
- Ward McAllister as Elder Kayler
- Olaf Hytten as Elder Marz
- Olive Sloane as Sadie Keane
- George Wynn as Jim Foster
- Cecil Morton York as Mr. Prescott

== See also ==
- Married to a Mormon
