= The Church of Jesus Christ of Latter-day Saints in France =

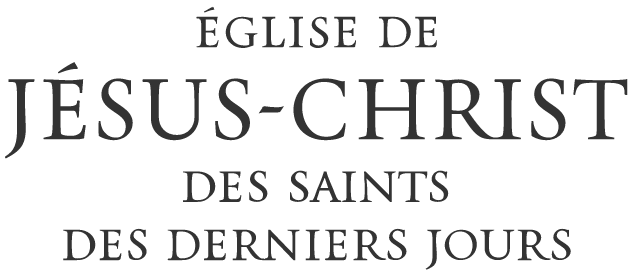
- (Logo in French)

- The Paris France Temple
- Area: Europe Central
- Members: 40,546 (2025)
- Stakes: 10
- Wards: 70
- Branches: 39
- Total congregations: 109
- Missions: 2
- Temples: 1 operating
- FamilySearch Centers: 71

The Church of Jesus Christ of Latter-day Saints has had a presence in France since 1849, and the first Latter-day Saint convert in the country was Augustus Saint d'Anna, in Le Havre. The Church claims a membership of about 40,546 in the country, representing less than 0.1% of the population.

== History ==
Membership in France
Year	Members
1909*	50
1930	645
1940*	600
1950	829
1960	1,509
1970	8,606
1980	11,198
1989*	21,000
1999	30,541
2009	34,906
2019	39,930
2025	40,546
*Membership was published as a rounded number. Source: Windall J. Ashton; Jim M. Wall, Deseret News, various years, Church Almanac Country Information: France

The first Latter-Day Saint missionary to preach in France was John Pack, who entered the country in 1849 with John Taylor. William Howells, who entered the country in 1849, was soon joined in his preaching by his daughter, and later by William C. Dunbar. In April 1850, the first congregation was composed of six members in the city of Boulogne-sur-Mer. Elder John Taylor, a Quorum of the Twelve Apostles member at the time, presided over the first mission in France. In 1853, there were only 337 members of the French mission. In 1863, Louis A. Bertrand, an early convert to the church involved in its establishment, wrote to Brigham Young that France was not a good field mission for the church. The mission was closed between 1864 and 1912, and between 1914 and 1923. The first place of worship was erected in 1962 in Nantes. There were only 77 people baptized in 1933 and 116 in 1951, but the number of baptisms increased from 1960.

The first French-language edition of the Book of Mormon was printed on January 28, 1852. A second edition was printed in 1907 in Zurich by Serge Ballif, a third in 1952 in Lyon, a fourth in 1962 by Marcel Kahne (a young missionary and L’Étoile du Déséret editor, who also revised Doctrine and Covenants and the Pearl of Great Price), and a fifth in 1977. From May 29, 1851 to April 1852, the Étoile periodical was printed. In 1861, Jules Rémy published a book entitled Journey to the land of Mormons. As response to this book, Louis Bertrand published several articles in La Revue contemporaine, and the following year, gathered his articles under the title Memoirs of a Mormon.

The Tabernacle Choir at Temple Square performed in Paris's Palais de Chaillot in 1955, in Strasbourg in 1991, and in Marseille in 1998.

Several presidents of the church have visited France, including Lorenzo Snow in February 1851, Quorum of the Twelve member David O. McKay in July 1952, and Gordon B. Hinckley on 4 June 1998.

== Temples ==
On July 15, 2011, plans to build the Paris France Temple were announced by President Thomas S. Monson. The temple, dedicated on May 21, 2017, was then one of the church's 156 operating temples.

156. Paris France Temple; Official website; News & images	
Location: Announced: Groundbreaking: Dedicated: Size:	Le Chesnay, France; 15 July 2011 by Thomas S. Monson; No formal groundbreaking 21 May 2017 by Henry B. Eyring; 44,175 sq ft (4,104.0 m^{2}) on a 2.26-acre (0.91 ha) site

== Status and membership ==
In 1952, the church was registered as a voluntary association (French 1901 law), and on July 4, 2009, officially became a religious association, as reported in the Official Journal.

=== Membership Statistics ===
As of June 2022, branches in French Guiana, Guadeloupe, and Martinique were located in the Guadeloupe District of the Barbados Bridgetown Mission. The Guadeloupe District office is located in Les Abymes, Guadeloupe. Branches in Réunion are located in the St Denis Reunion District of the Madagascar Antananarivo Mission. Regardless of their size, all congregations which are not part of a stake are called branches.

Country, Territory	Membership (2022)	Congregations	Family History Centers
Metropolitan France (Includes Corsica)	38,634	108	73
French Guiana	500	1	1
French Polynesia (Includes Tahiti)	29,397	97	29
Guadeloupe	550	3	1
Martinique	258	1	1
New Caledonia	2,494	9	3
Reunion	836	4	5

Table and membership information as of December 31, 2022.

=== Stakes ===
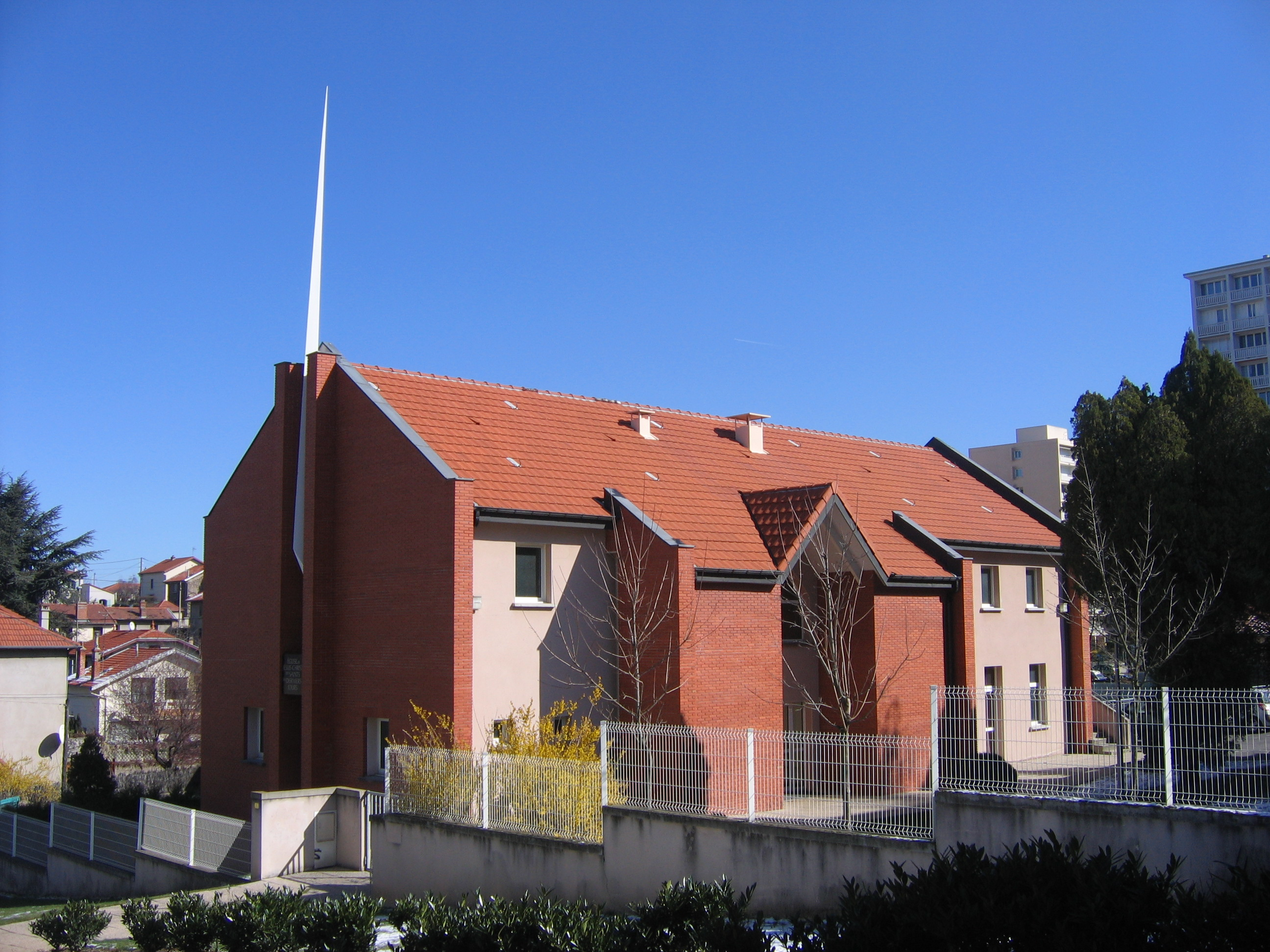
Meeting house of The Church of Jesus Christ of Latter-day Saints in Saint-Étienne, France

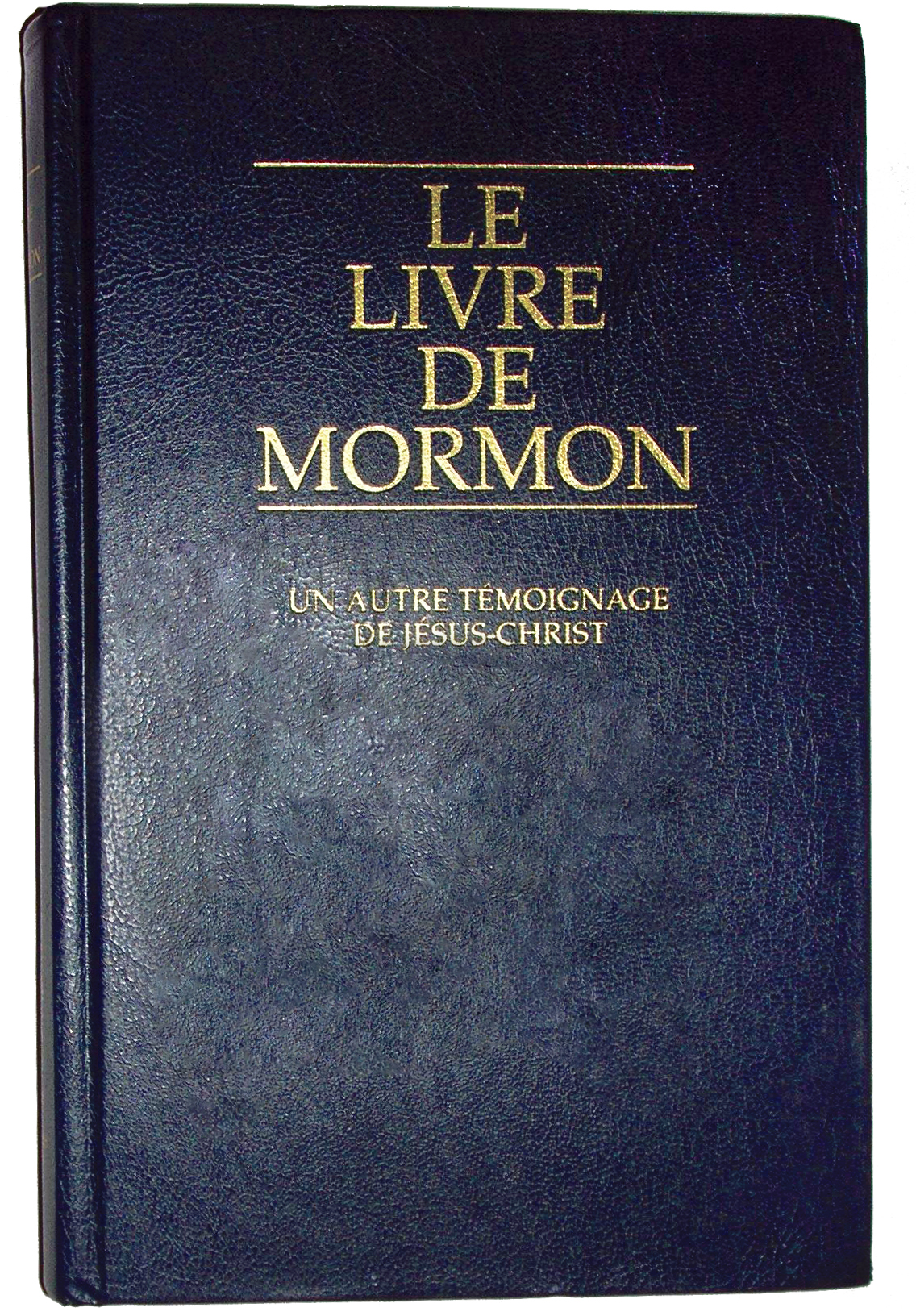
French-language Book of Mormon

As of December 2025, the LDS Church has 10 stakes centered in metropolitan France:

Stake	Organized	Mission
Bordeaux France	24 May 1992	France Paris South
Brussels Belgium^{a}	20 Feb 1977	France Paris North
Geneva Switzerland^{b}	20 Jun 1982	France Lyon
Lille France	17 Jan 1988	France Paris North
Lausanne Switzerland^{b}	28 Aug 2005	France Lyon
Lyon France	9 Sep 1990	France Lyon
Nancy France	24 Apr 1983	France Paris North
Nice France	11 May 1980	France Lyon
Paris France	16 Nov 1975	France Paris North
Paris France East	8 Mar 1992	France Paris North
Paris France South	15 Sep 2013	France Paris South
Rennes France	14 Dec 2003	France Paris South
Toulouse France	22 Sep 2002	France Paris South

^{a} Stake centered outside of France, no congregations in France, but in a French mission
^{b} Stake centered outside of France, but has congregations in France

=== Missions ===
Mission	Organized	Areas covered
France Lyon	1 Jul 1991	Southeast and eastern France and French-speaking areas of Switzerland
France Paris	18 Jun 1850	Northern France, Luxemburg, and parts of Belgium (namely Brussels and Wallonia)
France Paris South	1 Jul 2026	Western France

See Stakes section for list of stakes in each mission.

=== Luxembourg ===
The Church of Jesus Christ of Latter-day Saints in Luxembourg
- Area: Europe Central
- Members: 526 (2025)
- Wards: 2
- FamilySearch Centers: 1

In 2025, there are 526 members in 2 congregations in Luxembourg namely:

- Luxembourg 1st Ward (English/French speaking)
- Luxembourg 2nd Branch (Portuguese speaking)

Luxembourg congregations are part of the Nancy France Stake and in the France Paris North Mission and Paris France Temple District.

== Sociological profile ==
In 2000, a study led by Professor Bernadette Rigal-Cellier indicated that the majority of LDS members in France appeared to be former Catholics. LDS church members felt then that the non-conversion of French people to their church stemmed from a lack of interest in spiritual matters and mistrust in new beliefs. The LDS members surveyed thought that their church's growth would accelerate and that prejudice against them would disappear in the future. The author concluded that the church had become well-established in France and that its French members showed the same attachment to their country as other French people.

In 2009, an investigation directed by writer, religious sociologist and philosopher Christian Euvrard, also an LDS member, concluded that Mormons in France are demographically and politically similar to other French people. 30% were regular churchgoers, and their marriage and birth rates were higher than the national average. Primarily made up of urban dwellers and recent immigrants, LDS members considered the hardest doctrine of their religion to be the proscription on alcohol, coffee and tea. Only 30% of them were involved in an association and 83% believed that all religions hold some truth. However, LDS members differed from other French people in their moral codes: 93% of them were opposed to same-sex marriage.

== Reception ==
The LDS church was not mentioned in the list of dangerous cults in reports established by the Parliamentary Commission on Cults in France in 1995 and 1999. As there were no complaints from former members, the MILS deemed in 2000 that the church was "a religious group that does not generate problems in France". In its 2001 report, it stated that "seeing the definition of cultist nature of an association by the exclusive examination of its behavior in the light of human rights and public policy (...), the LDS Church shouldn't be considered as a cult". However, in its 2006 report, the MIVILUDES monitoring agency expressed concerns over the Calvin Thomas society, specialized in organizing linguistic travels, "as children have been placed in LDS families. The file of this society (...) is the subject of an investigation".

In a 2002 periodical, anti-cult association ADFI stated that it is "regularly contacted by families or individuals facing conflictual and painful situations because of the membership of a relative into this movement". Criticisms include methods of evangelism, gradual split with family and friends, women's status, lack of free thought, and children's education considered as indoctrination. The Lille chapter of the ADFI felt that "it is unhelpful to try to classify this church as cult or non-cult", and that "the likelihood is high that the genealogy becomes a major means of Mormon proselytizing". It also described English courses offered by the church as a "disguised way of recruiting new followers". To ADFI president Catherine Picard, the LDS church was "a movement with cultist deviancy". And for Marie Drilhon of the Yvelines ADFI chapter, the Mormonism was "a demanding church for the faithful", describing the pressure placed on some former members to return to the church, and considering that "people who are more fragile don't do well in this church."

== See also ==
- The Church of Jesus Christ of Latter-day Saints membership statistics
- The Church of Jesus Christ of Latter-day Saints in French Polynesia
- The Church of Jesus Christ of Latter-day Saints in New Caledonia
