= The Church of Jesus Christ of Latter-day Saints in Connecticut =

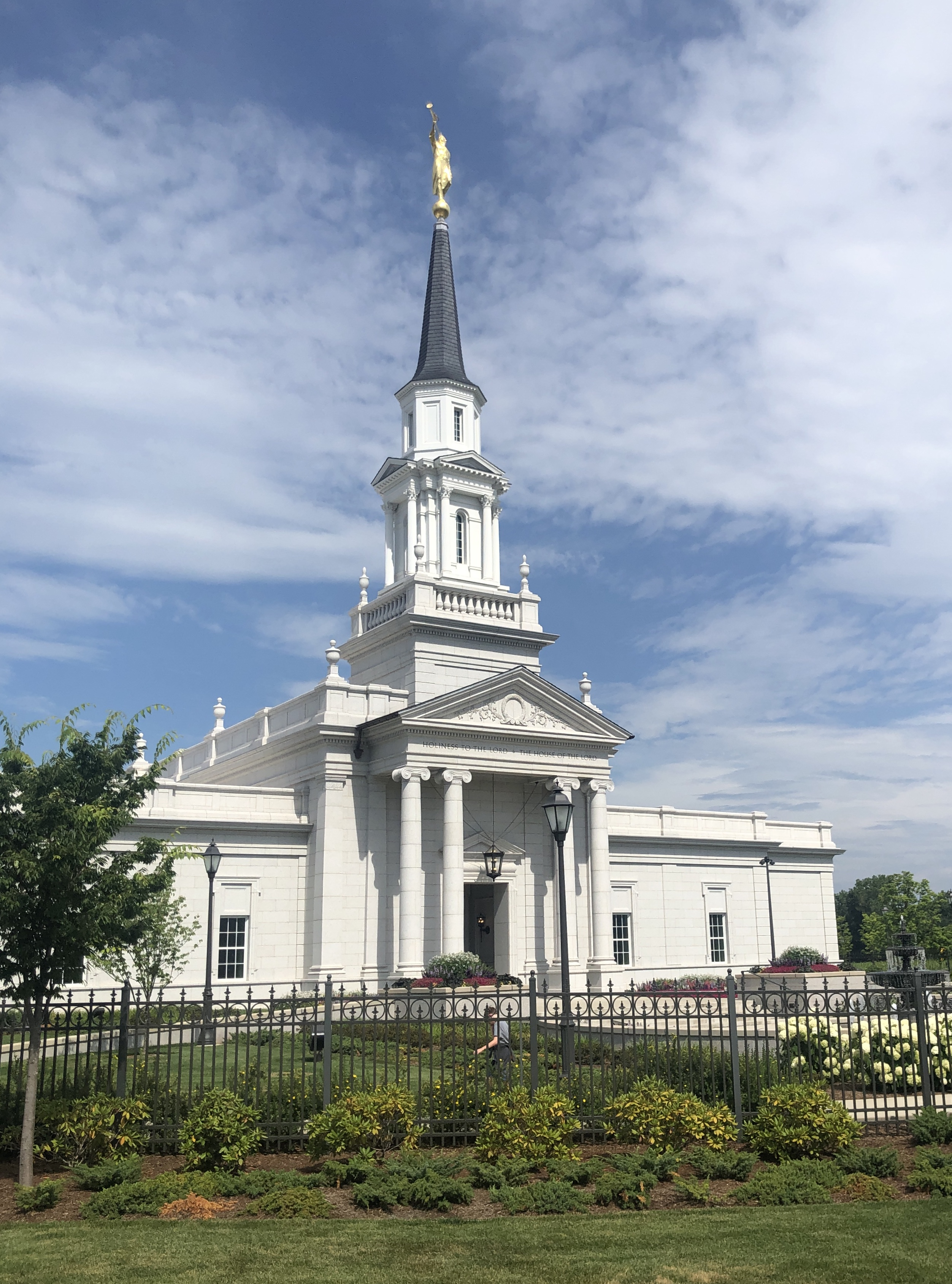
- The Hartford Connecticut Temple.
- Area: US Northeast
- Members: 16,442 (2025)
- Stakes: 3
- Wards: 25
- Branches: 6
- Total Congregations: 31
- Temples: 1
- FamilySearch Centers: 10

The Church of Jesus Christ of Latter-day Saints in Connecticut refers to the Church of Jesus Christ of Latter-day Saints (LDS Church) and its members in Connecticut. As of 2025, the LDS Church reported 16,442 members in 31 congregations.

Official church membership as a percentage of general population was 0.43% in 2014. TAccording to the 2014 Pew Forum on Religion & Public Life survey, roughly 1% of Connecticuters self-identify themselves most closely with the LDS Church. The LDS Church is the 10th largest denomination in Connecticut.

== History ==
Membership in Connecticut
Year	Membership
1930	198
1967	3,000
1980	6,300
1989	9,900
1999	12,163
2009	14,579
2019	15,946
2024	16,366
*Membership was published as a rounded number. Source: Wendall J. Ashton; Jim M. Wall, Deseret News, various years, Church Almanac State Information: Connecticut

The first missionaries arrived in the state in Salisbury in 1832, only two years after the church was founded by Joseph Smith.

In 2010, an estimated 40,000 people—over the course of its month-long open house—visited the new Hartford Connecticut Temple.

== Stakes ==
As of July 2026, the following stakes are in Connecticut:

Stake	Organized	Mission
Fairfield Connecticut	30 Apr 1978	New York New York City
Hartford Connecticut	18 Sep 1966	Massachusetts Boston
New Haven Connecticut	30 Aug 1981	Massachusetts Boston
New London Connecticut	12 Jun 2016	Massachusetts Boston
Springfield Massachusetts Stake (Note: Stake located outside Connecticut with congregation(s) meeting in Connecticut)	28 Jun 1987	New Hampshire Manchester

== Missions ==
The following table lists missions that have served Connecticut and the dates they were organized or consolidated:

Mission Serving Connecticut	Organized/Consolidated
Eastern States	May 6, 1839
Eastern States	January 1893
New England	September 24, 1937
Massachusetts Boston	June 20, 1974
Connecticut Hartford	July 1, 1979
Massachusetts Boston	July 1, 2011

- The Eastern States Mission was discontinued in April 1850. It was reopened in January 1893. Little missionary work was done between 1850 and 1893.
- On June 20, 1974, the name of the New England Mission was changed to the Massachusetts Boston Mission. No new mission was created.
- The Connecticut Hartford Mission was consolidated into the Massachusetts Boston Mission on July 1, 2011.

== Temples ==
On October 2, 2010 the Hartford Connecticut Temple was announced by church president Thomas S. Monson. He later broke ground for the temple in August 2013. The temple was later dedicated in November 2016 following a public open house.

155. Hartford Connecticut Temple; Official website; News & images	
Location: Announced: Groundbreaking: Dedicated: Size: Notes:	Farmington, Connecticut, United States; October 2, 2010 by Thomas S. Monson; August 17, 2013 by Thomas S. Monson; November 20, 2016 by Henry B. Eyring; 32,246 sq ft (2,995.8 m^{2}) on a 11.3-acre (4.6 ha) site On October 2, 2010, Thomas S. Monson announced that the Hartford, Connecticut temple would be built. Originally a temple in Harrison, New York was announced in the early 90s; however, in 1995 efforts towards construction were abandoned and it was announced that 2 temples would be built instead: the Boston Massachusetts Temple and the White Plains New York Temple.
