= Hartford Connecticut Temple =

Temple of the LDS church

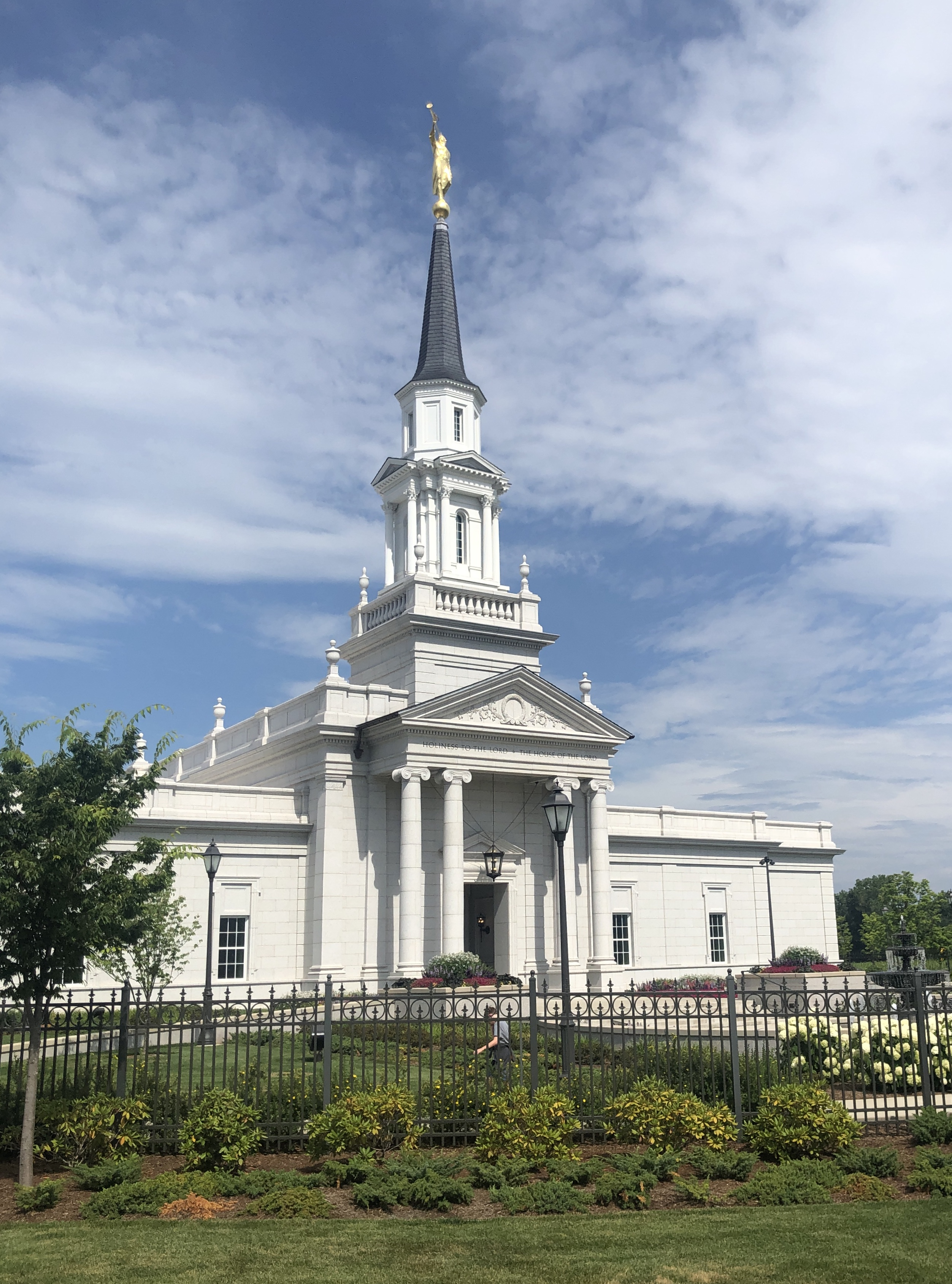
- Hartford Connecticut Temple, 2019
- Interactive map of Hartford Connecticut Temple
- Number: 155
- Dedication: November 20, 2016, by Henry B. Eyring
- Site: 11.3 acres (4.6 ha)
- Floor area: 32,246 ft^{2} (2,995.8 m^{2})
- Height: 117.2 ft (35.7 m)
- Official website • News & images

Church chronology
← Star Valley Wyoming Temple	Hartford Connecticut Temple	→ Paris France Temple

Additional information
- Announced: October 2, 2010, by Thomas S. Monson
- Groundbreaking: August 17, 2013, by Thomas S. Monson
- Open house: Friday, September 30, 2016-Saturday, October 22, 2016
- Current president: William Sowa
- Location: Farmington, Connecticut, United States
- Coordinates: 41°44′14″N 72°50′38″W
- Baptistries: 1
- Ordinance rooms: 2 (two-stage progressive)
- Sealing rooms: 2
- Notes: On October 2, 2010, Thomas S. Monson announced that the Hartford, Connecticut temple would be built. Originally a temple in Harrison, New York was announced in the early 90s; however, in 1995 efforts towards construction were abandoned and it was announced that 2 temples would be built instead: the Boston Massachusetts Temple and the White Plains New York Temple.

The Hartford Connecticut Temple is a temple of the Church of Jesus Christ of Latter-day Saints (LDS Church) in Farmington, Connecticut. The intent to build the temple was announced on October 2, 2010, by church president Thomas S. Monson, during general conference. It is the church's first in Connecticut and second in New England, following the Boston Massachusetts Temple.

The temple is located at the intersection of Melrose Drive and Farmington Avenue. It has a single attached end spire with a statue of the angel Moroni. This temple was designed by FFKR Architects, using a Neo-Classical architectural style with a Federal influence. A groundbreaking ceremony, to signify the beginning of construction, was held on August 17, 2013, conducted by Monson.

== History ==
On October 3, 1992, during the church's general conference, Gordon B. Hinckley, First Counselor in the First Presidency, announced plans for a temple in Hartford. However, three years later, plans for this temple were replaced with plans for the Boston and White Plains New York temples (later to be renamed the Harrison New York Temple).

In the October 1995 general conference, Hinckley explained,

After working for years to acquire a suitable site in the Hartford area, during which time the Church has grown appreciably in areas to the north and south, we have determined that we will not at this time build a temple in the immediate area of Hartford.

Hinckley apologized to the members of Hartford, who had joyed in the announcement of this temple, by saying,

We apologize to our faithful Saints in the Hartford area. We know you will be disappointed in this announcement. You know that we, and your local officers, have spent countless hours searching for a suitable location that would handle the needs of the Saints in New York and New England. While we deeply regret disappointing the people in the Hartford area, we are satisfied that we have been led to the present decision, and that temples will be located in such areas that our Saints in the Hartford area will not have to drive unreasonable distances.

Construction on the temple in Boston was completed in October 2000. However, construction of a temple in White Plains, on a 24-acre site for the temple at the intersection of Interstate 287 and Hutchinson River Parkway, was never started and eventually suspended. Reportedly, efforts had been underway until 2004, but construction was delayed by lawsuits and objections by local officials, and this temple was removed from the list on the church's official temple website soon after the Manhattan New York Temple dedication.

=== Second Announcement ===
On October 2, 2010, during general conference, church president Thomas S. Monson announced plans for the construction of a temple in Hartford, 18 years after the original announcement by Hinckley.

In May 2012, the church released a rendering of the temple and announced it would be built in Farmington. The temple was planned to be approximately 25,000 square feet and the site plan was approved by the town planning and zoning commission in June 2012.

Ground was broken for the new temple by Monson on August 17, 2013. After construction was completed, a public open house was held from September 30 through October 22, 2016, excluding October 1 and Sundays. The temple was dedicated by Henry B. Eyring on November 20, 2016.

In 2018, Architectural Digest chose the temple as the most beautiful place of worship in Connecticut.

== Design and architecture ==
The temple was built in “the Neo-Classical revival style of American Georgian architecture, with a Federal influence.” Designed by David Rees of FFKR Architects, its architecture reflects the cultural heritage of New England and its spiritual significance to the church.

The temple is on an 11.3-acre plot, and the landscaping around the temple features a large lawn and numerous trees. This is designed to provide a tranquil setting to enhance the sacred atmosphere of the site.

The structure stands one story tall, and is constructed with granite cladding. The exterior has a steeple designed to imitate that of Farmington’s First Church of Christ Congregational, a church designed in 1772 by the great-uncle of church president Wilford Woodruff. Beneath the steeple is a triangular tympanum, which depicts an oak-leaf wreath and acanthus scrolls. The exterior also features art glass inspired by historic divided light fixtures.

The interior has art glass, original wall murals, and hand-tufted carpets. Oak leaves and acorns are used as design motifs throughout the temple. The temple includes two sealing rooms, two instruction rooms, and a baptistry, each arranged for ceremonial use.

The design uses symbolic elements representing the heritage of the Hartford area, to provide spiritual meaning to its appearance and function. Symbolism is important to church members and include the oak leaf and acorn motifs used in the temple’s interior design, which represent “the beauty of the oak trees throughout the state and the famous Charter Oak in particular.”

== Temple presidents ==
The church's temples are directed by a temple president and matron, each serving for a term of three years. The president and matron oversee the administration of temple operations and provide guidance and training for both temple patrons and staff.

Serving from 2016 to 2019, the first president of the Hartford Connecticut Temple was Wayne S. Taylor, with the matron being Carol J. Taylor. As of 2024, James C. Forsberg is the president, with Roberta J. Forsberg serving as matron.

== Admittance ==
After construction finished, a public open house was held from September 30–October 22, 2016 (excluding Sundays). The temple was dedicated by Henry B. Eyring on November 20, 2016, in three sessions.

Like all the church's temples, it is not used for Sunday worship services. To members of the church, temples are regarded as sacred houses of the Lord. Once dedicated, only church members with a current temple recommend can enter for worship.

== See also ==
Temples in the Northeastern United States
- = Operating
- = Under construction
- = Announced
- = Temporarily Closed
- Comparison of temples of The Church of Jesus Christ of Latter-day Saints
- List of temples of The Church of Jesus Christ of Latter-day Saints
- List of temples of The Church of Jesus Christ of Latter-day Saints by geographic region
- Temple architecture (Latter-day Saints)
- The Church of Jesus Christ of Latter-day Saints in Connecticut
