= Lee Greene Richards =

American painter (1878-1950)

- Self-Portrait
- Born: Levi Greene Richards; July 27, 1878
- Died: February 20, 1950 (aged 71)
- Education: Académie Julian, École des Beaux-Arts
- Known for: Portraiture, Landscapes, Murals
- Spouse: Mary Jane Eldredge
- Relatives: Levi Richards (grandfather); Willard Richards (great uncle)

Lee Greene Richards (July 27, 1878 – February 20, 1950) was a famous Utah portrait artist. Many of his works can be found at the City and County Building in Salt Lake City, Utah.

== Biography ==
Richards was the son of Levi W. and Lula Greene Richards. His father was the son of Levi Richards who was the brother of Joseph Smith's physician (Willard Richards) in Nauvoo, Illinois. He was actually named Levi after his father but went by Lee. Levi W. Richards and his mother Sarah Griffith Richards had been painters. Lee Richards was raised as a member of the Church of Jesus Christ of Latter-day Saints (LDS Church) and in 1895 he served as an LDS missionary in England. Richards went to Paris in 1901 where he studied at the Académie Julian and the École des Beaux-Arts. In 1904 he returned to Utah where he started an art studio. In 1908 Richards married Mary Jane Eldredge, whose father was a wealthy banker. They spent over a year on their honeymoon in Paris.

Richards was known best for his portraiture, but he also painted landscapes. Some of his murals are featured inside the Utah Capitol Building. He worked alongside Alma B. Wright in 1916 to paint the mural "Utah Lake" on a wall of the capitol. He also painted portraits of Utah governors, featured in the Hall of Governors. These portraits included governors William Spry, Charles Rendell Mabey, and Herbert Brown Maw. The Rotunda in the Utah Capitol building was left unfinished for many years until the Public Works of Art Project (PWAP) funded art commissions for the Capitol. He also finished a mural "Great Men of Knowledge" in 1940 in the University of Utah Park Building which was modified in 2000 due to the objections of Muslim student of it depicting Muhammad. Richards planned and sketched the paintings, and then worked with artists Gordon Cope and Henry Rasmussen to complete the project. The paintings were completed in 1934 and installed in the Capitol the following year to mark the opening of the Utah Arts Institute annual exhibition. Richards painted portraits of many presidents and leaders of the LDS Church, a number of which are now displayed in the Church History Museum in Salt Lake City, murals for the Cardston Alberta Temple, and one for the Mesa Arizona Temple. The Utah Museum of Fine Arts has a large collection of his portraits and murals. In 1921 Richards was the only American to serve as a judge at the Salon d'Automne.

From 1938 to 1947 Richards was an art professor at the University of Utah.

== Locations of works ==
Lee Greene Richards' paintings are featured throughout the United States. The following are known locations of his works.

=== In the Utah Museum of Fine Arts (UMFA) ===
- A Grandson of Utah Pioneers (1945)
- After The Hunt (1911)
- Artists Daughter Holding a Globe of The World (1916)
- Below the Hills (1931)
- Breton Fisher Boy (1903)
- Fields of Hurricane (1928)
- French Farm House
- Harold Eldridge
- Indian Paint Brush (1929)
- Iris (1910)
- Lady Cutting Cabbage (1923)
- Mountain Scene
