= Flandin =

Flandin is a French surname. Notable people with the surname include:

- Eugène Flandin (1809–1889), French painter
- Hervé Flandin (born 1965), French biathlete
- Pierre-Étienne Flandin (1889–1959), French politician

== See also ==
- Louis A. Bertrand (1808–1875), leader of the Church of Jesus Christ of Latter-day Saints, was born John Francis Elias Flandin
