= Herald Building =

Herald Building may refer to:

- New York Herald Building at Herald Square, New York City
- New York Herald Building (Broadway and Ann Street), New York City
- Herald Building (Salt Lake City)
