= Herald Building (Salt Lake City) =

Historic building in Salt Lake City, Utah, U.S.

- U.S. National Register of Historic Places
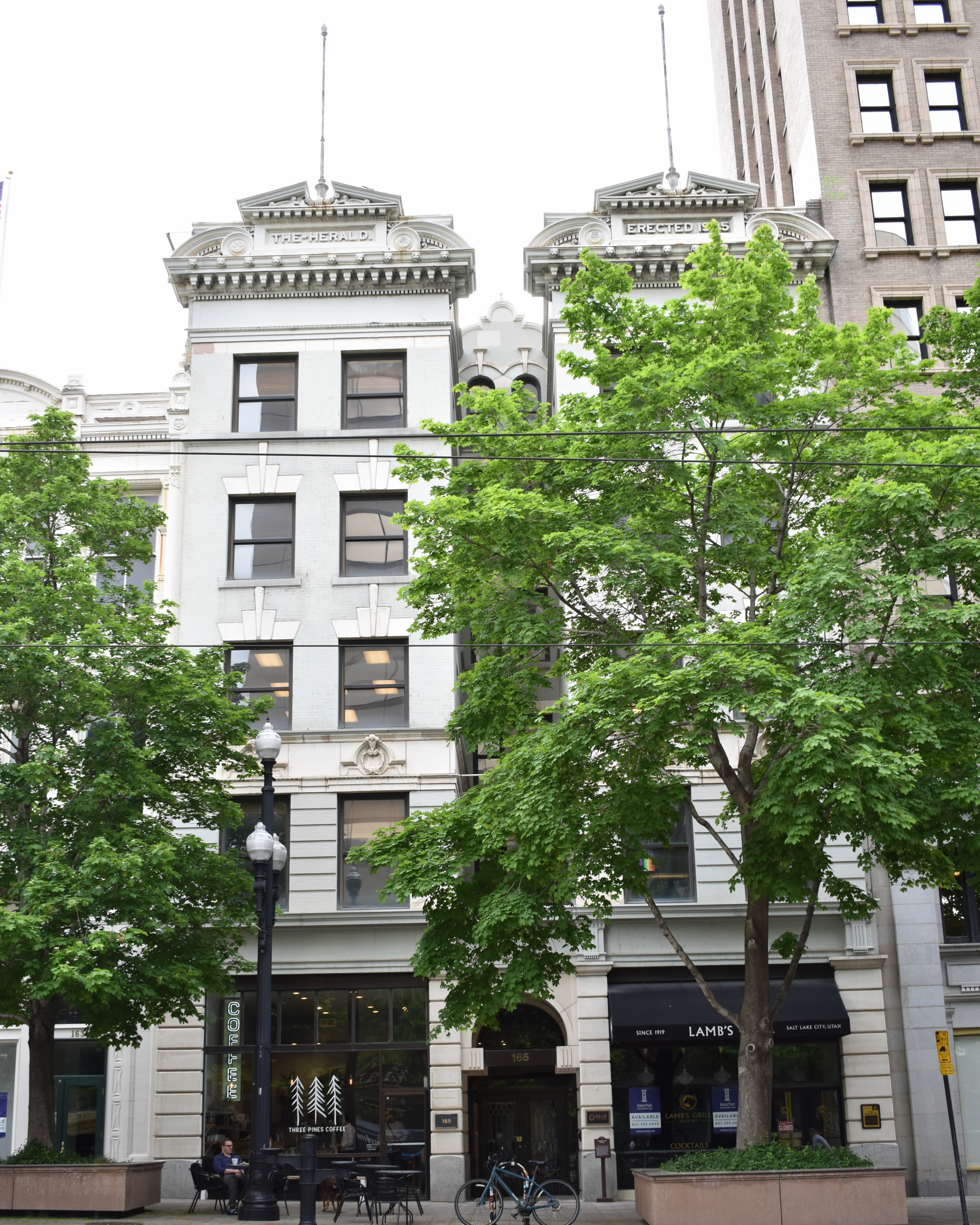
- The Herald Building in 2019

- Location within Utah Location within the United States
- Location: 165-169 S. Main St., Salt Lake City, Utah
- Coordinates: 40°45′56″N 111°53′24″W
- Area: less than one acre
- Built: 1905
- Built by: A. & J. McDonald
- Architect: John C. Craig
- Architectural style: Early Commercial, Classical Revival
- NRHP reference No.: 76001827
- Added to NRHP: July 30, 1976

The Herald Building in Salt Lake City, Utah, is a 5-story brick and stone commercial building designed by Chicago architect John C. Craig and constructed by A. & J. McDonald in 1905. The U-shape building contains two 4-story wings on either side of a narrow light well. Horizontal bands of stone and decorative lintels and keystones separate window fenestrations between floors, and a tin cornice on each wing contains "broken pediments, volutes, lion's heads, cove mouldings, brackets, dentils, and flagpoles." The building was added to the National Register of Historic Places in 1976.

The Salt Lake Daily Herald was a newspaper founded in 1870 by publishers William C. Dunbar and Edward L. Sloan. The Herald ceased publication in 1920. At the time of construction of the Herald Building, the newspaper was owned by William A. Clark, a wealthy entrepreneur and politician from Montana. Clark also owned the Butte Miner. In 1904 Clark formed a realty company with Richard C. Kerens, Thomas Kearns, and David Keith for construction projects in Salt Lake City, including the $100,000 Herald Building.

Construction on the Herald Building included a concrete mixer for the concrete foundation, and the building was the first location in Salt Lake City where either the mixer or the foundation material was used.

In 1905, The Herald installed a custom made, R. Hoe & Company press in the basement of the new building. Capacity of the machine included 24,000 12-page papers or 12,000 24-page papers per hour, and the newspaper could now be printed in three colors and black, no longer limited to black ink alone. The Herald published the city's first colorful Sunday comics section on December 31, 1905.

The Herald occupied the building 1905–1913. Space was leased by The Salt Lake Telegram in 1918, and later the building was converted for use by the Little Hotel. An early tenant of the Herald Building was the Los Angeles and Salt Lake Railroad, and William A. Clark also was a major stockholder in that company. Lamb's Grill occupied space in the building 1939–2017.

Maybe included in Warehouse District NRHP listing.
