= William Howells (Mormon) =

William Howell (September 1816 – 21 November 1851) was a Welsh Mormon missionary. He was the first missionary of the Church of Jesus Christ of Latter-day Saints (LDS Church) to preach in France. Note, due to a flourish in his penmanship, some historians use 'Howells'. However, his descendants use, as is shown through genealogy, the singular version of 'Howell'.

== Early life ==
Howell was born in Penmark, in the Vale of Glamorgan, and was christened at St Donats on 18 September 1816. He was raised as a Baptist and married Martha Williams in September 1839. Howell became a store-owner and was financially successful. For a brief period of time he was a Baptist missionary in Brittany, where he learned to speak French.

== Mormonism ==
In 1847, Howell was intrigued by a vigorous dispute in the area between Mormon missionaries and Baptist ministers. Howell obtained some of the missionaries' pamphlets and came to the determination that the Mormons were correct. He was baptised by Dan Jones. Jones was a fellow Welshman, who had emigrated to the United States, joined the Church of Jesus Christ of Latter-day Saints and had returned in 1845 as a missionary to Wales. By 1849, Howells had baptised 100 of his family and associates into the LDS Church.

In 1849, Howell was ordained a high priest and sent to France as the first missionary for the LDS Church in that country. He preached first in Le Havre, where he baptized Augustus Saint d'Anna as the first French convert. After a month of preaching, Howell returned to Wales to visit his family, returning a few weeks later with his daughter Ann, who preached with him for the next three months. They were joined by William C. Dunbar a Scottish convert who had been sent to France via the Channel Islands to aid in the missionary work. In 1849–50, Howell briefly returned to Wales three more times, each time returning to France to continue his preaching.

Howell completed his mission in 1851, upon which he and his wife decided to immigrate to Utah Territory. They sailed from Liverpool in March 1851 and arrived in Council Bluffs, Iowa in June. Howell opened a store in Council Bluffs and grew sick and died there in November.

== See also ==
- The Church of Jesus Christ of Latter-day Saints in France
