= Lula Greene Richards =

American poet

Louisa Lula Greene Richards
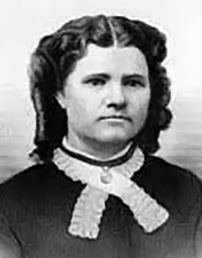
- Born: April 8, 1849; Kanesville, Iowa
- Died: September 9, 1944 (aged 95); Salt Lake City, Utah
- Occupations: Poet and editor
- Spouse: Levi Willard Richards
- Children: 7

Louisa Lula Greene Richards (April 8, 1849 – September 9, 1944) was a poet and the first female periodical editor in Utah Territory. Richards's work was published under a variety of names, including Louisa L. Greene, Louise L. Green, Lula Green, and Lula G. Richards. She was a member of the Church of Jesus Christ of Latter-day Saints (LDS Church).

== Early life and education ==
Louisa Lula Greene was born in Kanesville, Iowa, to Evan M. Greene (a son of John P. Greene) and Susan Kent. Lula was the eighth of their thirteen children. She was born during an outbreak of cholera. Throughout her life, she was a member of the LDS Church. Both of her grandmothers were sisters to LDS Church president Brigham Young. Her family moved to Kanesville in 1846. In 1852, they moved to Salt Lake City, Utah Territory, after Young evacuated Kanesville. Greene later lived in Provo, and her family moved to Grantsville in 1859, and they moved again to and Smithfield in 1864.

Greene began writing poetry as a young girl and there is evidence that she wrote poetry at age fourteen. From 1868 to 1869, Greene attended a private school in Salt Lake City. When Greene was 18, she and her sister began a small school in Cache County, Utah; however, Greene lacked patience with her students and did not have formal training. In 1869, she returned to school at the University of Deseret in Salt Lake City.

== Career ==
In 1869, Greene was the editor of the Smithfield Sunday School Gazette, a small periodical issued to individuals who attended the LDS Church Sunday School in Smithfield for six issues from October to November. However, in 1871, she was required to return to Smithfield due to a family illness. Lacking the money she needed for the trip, Greene submitted a poem to the Salt Lake Daily Herald and asked editor Edward L. Sloan to buy it for $7.50, which was the amount of money she needed to return home. Sloan agreed, and her poem "Tired Out" was published on the front page of the Daily Herald.

Sloan soon contacted Greene in 1872 and asked her if she would be interested in being the editor of a newspaper for Latter-day Saint women called Woman's Exponent. Greene conferred with general Relief Society president Eliza R. Snow, and after receiving her blessing and the approval of Brigham Young, Greene accepted Sloan's offer. In 1872, Women's Exponent began publication in Salt Lake City with Greene as editor. Her name was printed as "L. L. Greene" in the first issue, but due to letters to the editor that assumed she was male, she changed her name to "Louise L. Greene" in subsequent issues. Greene edited the periodical until she was succeeded in 1877 by Emmeline B. Wells, who edited until Women's Exponent was discontinued in 1914. Greene requested to leave her position there due to responsibilities at home and to her family. However, she continued to contribute to the Exponent and other church publications.

In 1873, Greene married Levi Willard Richards, the son of Levi Richards and a nephew of church leader Willard Richards. Levi served in many positions in the LDS Church, including as a member of the general board of the Sunday School and as a patriarch. Lula and Levi had seven children, four of whom lived to adulthood. One of their children was the artist Lee Greene Richards.

In 1883, Louisa Richards became an editor with the Juvenile Instructor, an LDS periodical edited by George Q. Cannon. She wrote and edited the column "Our Little Folks" until 1907, when it was discontinued. Richards wrote poetry, and her poems appeared in Woman’s Exponent, Juvenile Instructor, Improvement Era, Young Woman's Journal, Children’s Friend, and Relief Society Magazine.

== Later life ==
Her husband, Levi, took a plural wife, Persis Louisa Young, who was Greene's niece. They were married on the eleventh anniversary of Lula and Levi's wedding. Persis stayed at the Richards' household and helped with chores. Levi died in 1914.

Richards continued to be an active member of the LDS Church. She helped with the Young Ladies' Mutual Improvement Association and the Relief Society. She was also called by the church to be a member of the General Board of the Primary, a position she held for twenty-five years. She worked in the Salt Lake Temple from its dedication in 1893 until 1934. She continued writing until her death. Richards died on September 9, 1944, in Salt Lake City.

== Publications ==
=== Poetry ===
- Howe, Susan Elizabeth; Bench, Sheree Maxwell, eds. (1890). "An Apology". Discoveries: Two Centuries of Poems by Mormon Women. Salt Lake City, Utah: Joseph Fielding Smith Institute for Latter-day Saint History/Association for Mormon Letters (published 2004). OCLC 55622597.
- Howe, Susan Elizabeth; Bench, Sheree Maxwell, eds. (1890). "On My Fourteenth Birthday". Discoveries: Two Centuries of Poems by Mormon Women. Salt Lake City, Utah: Joseph Fielding Smith Institute for Latter-day Saint History/Association for Mormon Letters (published 2004). OCLC 55622597.
- "Our Work and Our Wealth". The Children's Friend. 1 (1): 1. January 1902.
- "Our Baby". The Children's Friend. 1 (2): 57–58. February 1902.
- "Our Hero Washington". The Children's Friend. 1 (2): 61. February 1902.
- "Angel Guides". The Children's Friend. 1 (6): 192–193. June 1902.
- "Thou Shalt Not Take the Name of the Lord Thy God in Vain". The Children's Friend. 1 (7): 245–247. July 1902.
- "Sacrifice". The Children's Friend. 1 (9): 308–309. September 1902.
- Branches That Run Over the Wall: A Book of Mormon Poem and Other Writings. Salt Lake City: The Magazine Printing Company. 1904. OCLC 682471839.
- "The Bridegroom Cometh". Relief Society Magazine. 2 (7): 311. July 1915.
- "To My Mother". Relief Society Magazine. 3 (7): 361. July 1916.
- "My Friend". Relief Society Magazine. 3 (3): 148. March 1916.
- "A Sure Defense: Prayer and Love". Relief Society Magazine. 3 (10): 546. October 1916.
- "Similitude". Relief Society Magazine. 3 (12): 661. December 1916.
- "Alice". Relief Society Magazine. 4 (3): 137. March 1917.
- "A Bouquet and a Sentiment". Relief Society Magazine. 4 (9): 481. September 1917.
- "To President Joseph F. Smith, His Family and All Mourners". Relief Society Magazine. 5 (3): 123. March 1918.
- "A Lament: For a Tree that was Ruthlessly Spoiled by an Unknown Hand". Relief Society Magazine. 5 (6): 305. June 1918.
- "A Christmas Sonnet". Relief Society Magazine. 5 (12): 690. December 1918.
- "The Blessedness of Pure Young Love: To the Bridegroom and Bride". Relief Society Magazine. 6 (2): 91. February 1919.
- "The Records of the Dead". Relief Society Magazine. 6 (9): 497. September 1919.
- "Our God and Friend". Relief Society Magazine. 6 (11): 621. November 1919.
- "Promoted". Relief Society Magazine. 7 (2): 89. February 1920.
- "We Mothers of Men". Relief Society Magazine. 7 (5): 249. May 1920.
- "Don't Let the Baby Forget Me". Relief Society Magazine. 8 (11): 639. August 1921.
- "A Little Child at the Christmas Tide". Relief Society Magazine. 8 (12): 675. December 1921.
- "Mutual Appreciation". Relief Society Magazine. 9 (10): 503. October 1922.
- "Treasured Works". Relief Society Magazine. 10 (4): 159. April 1923.
- "Aunt Lydia Ann and Aunt Susan A, Wells: Their Testimonies". Relief Society Magazine. 10 (7): 319–320. July 1923.
- "Eliza S. Neslin". Relief Society Magazine. 12 (2): 62. February 1925.
- "Mother's Answer". Relief Society Magazine. 12 (5): 117. May 1925.
- "Beatitudes". Relief Society Magazine. 12 (9): 475. September 1925.
- "To President Heber J. Grant on his Seventieth Birthday, Monday, November 22, 1926". Relief Society Magazine. 14 (1): 3. January 1927.
- "Mary". Relief Society Magazine. 14 (4): 117. April 1927.
- "To Dr. Ellis R. Shipp on her Eightieth Birthday". Relief Society Magazine. 14 (5): 260. May 1927.
- "A Treasured Volume". Relief Society Magazine. 14 (9): 433–434. September 1927.
- "Retrospect". Relief Society Magazine. 16 (4): 186. April 1929.
- "Emily". Relief Society Magazine. 16 (10): 526. October 1929.
- "Greetings and Praise". Relief Society Magazine. 17 (1): 3. January 1930.
- Canon, Annie Wells, ed. (1941). "Apostrophe". Our legacy: Relief Society centennial anthology of verse by Latter-day Saint women, 1835-1942. Salt Lake City, Utah: General Board of Relief Society. OCLC 4262352.
- Canon, Annie Wells, ed. (1941). "The Sego Lily". Our legacy: Relief Society centennial anthology of verse by Latter-day Saint women, 1835-1942. Salt Lake City, Utah: General Board of Relief Society. OCLC 4262352.
- Canon, Annie Wells, ed. (1941). "Thank God". Our legacy: Relief Society centennial anthology of verse by Latter-day Saint women, 1835-1942. Salt Lake City, Utah: General Board of Relief Society. OCLC 4262352.

=== Fiction ===
- "Jared of Nain: A Romance". Relief Society Magazine. 5 (7): 389–399. August 1918.
- "Jerusalem, the City of Cities". Relief Society Magazine. 5 (8): 435–438. August 1918.
- "After Awhile". The Improvement Era. 36: 226. 1933.
