= John C. Craig =

American architect

John Charles Craig (born 1865) was an architect in Salt Lake City, Utah.

He was born in 1865 in Iowa. He worked for several years in Denver, Seattle and Chicago, moving to Salt Lake City in 1902, where he designed several prominent works.

Works include:

- Bransford Apartments (1903), also known as Louise Grace Emery Apartments and Eagle Gate Apartments, Salt Lake City. Demolished.
- Herald Building (1905), 165-169 S. Main St., Salt Lake City
- Salt Lake Stock and Mining Exchange Building (1908–09), 39 Exchange Pl., Salt Lake City
- Moxum Hotel (1908), 90 E. 400 South, Salt Lake City. Demolished.
- New Grand Hotel (1910), 385 S. Main Street, Salt Lake City.
- Shubrick Apartment Hotel (1912), 72 West 400 South, Salt Lake City. Demolished.
