= Paris France Temple =

LDS Church temple in Le Chesnay, Paris, France

- Interactive map of Paris France Temple
- Number: 156
- Dedication: 21 May 2017, by Henry B. Eyring
- Site: 2.26 acres (0.91 ha)
- Floor area: 44,175 ft^{2} (4,104.0 m^{2})
- Official website • News & images

Church chronology
← Hartford Connecticut Temple	Paris France Temple	→ Tucson Arizona Temple

Additional information
- Announced: 15 July 2011, by Thomas S. Monson
- Groundbreaking: No formal groundbreaking
- Open house: 22 April - 13 May 2017
- Current president: Jean-Christophe Seube
- Location: Le Chesnay, France
- Coordinates: 48°49′4.41″N 2°7′23.42″E
- Exterior finish: Warm-toned limestone with character reflective of limestone used in the Le Chesnay and Versailles regions
- Baptistries: 1
- Ordinance rooms: 2 (two-stage progressive)
- Sealing rooms: 3
- Clothing rental: Yes
- Visitors' center: Yes

The Paris France Temple is a temple of the Church of Jesus Christ of Latter-day Saints in Le Chesnay, a suburb of Paris, France. The temple was officially announced on October 1, 2011, by church president Thomas S. Monson during general conference.

== History ==
One of the first mentions of a temple in France was in 1976, when church president Spencer W. Kimball told members that one day a temple would be built in their country. In 1998, French church members were again assured that they would one day have a temple in their country by church president Gordon B. Hinckley, who said in a meeting that the church would begin looking for a site to build a temple.

On 15 July 2011, church president Monson announced that a temple would be constructed in France. New temples are generally announced during a church general conference. However, French newspapers reported the church's plans to build the temple at Le Chesnay, which prompted the early announcement, three months prior to the October 2011 general conference.

Local opposition initially included Mayor Philippe Brillault who opposed the temple—planned on a site for an abandoned, asbestos-choked power plant—and proclaimed, "We weren’t overjoyed, because Mormons have an image that’s pretty much negative." After learning more about the LDS Church and talking with presiding bishop Gérald Caussé, a fellow Frenchman, Brillault eventually supported the idea. Caussé later called Brillault "a true friend of the church."

Ground was broken for the temple on August 24, 2012. No groundbreaking ceremony was held. The temple was dedicated on 21 May 2017 by Henry B. Eyring.

== Design and architecture ==
The building's architectural design uses surrounding French monuments and the nearby Palace of Versailles, as well as traditional Latter-day Saint temple design.

The temple is on a 2.26-acre plot, with surrounding landscaping of gardens and courtyards, along with a visitors' center. The gardens include a reproduction of Bertel Thorvaldsen’s Christus statue.

The structure is constructed with limestone which is similar to the stone used for other buildings in the area, including Versailles. The exterior has flat roof, which is an uncommon for the church's temples. At the time of its construction, it was one of only four temples without a steeple or an angel Moroni statue. The other three were the Cardston Alberta, Laie Hawaii, and Mesa Arizona temples.

The interior has art-glass windows with floral patterns, including a large stained-glass skylight that sits above the baptistry. The temple’s furnishings are in French Classical and Art Nouveau styles, with artwork throughout the temple. In addition to the baptistry, the temple also has two ordinance rooms and three sealing rooms.

The design uses symbolic elements representing French art and culture. The floral motifs in the art-glass windows "are reflective of plants native to France and are based on the floral designs of artist Claude Monet's gardens such as lilies, cornflower, lilacs and hollyhocks." The temple’s decorative motifs were also inspired by the fleur-de-lis, which is France’s national symbol and represents purity and virtue.

The adjacent visitors' center has interactive displays and a 3D cut-out model of the temple, providing information for both members and non-members on the role temples play in the lives of church members.

== Gallery ==
Exterior of the temple

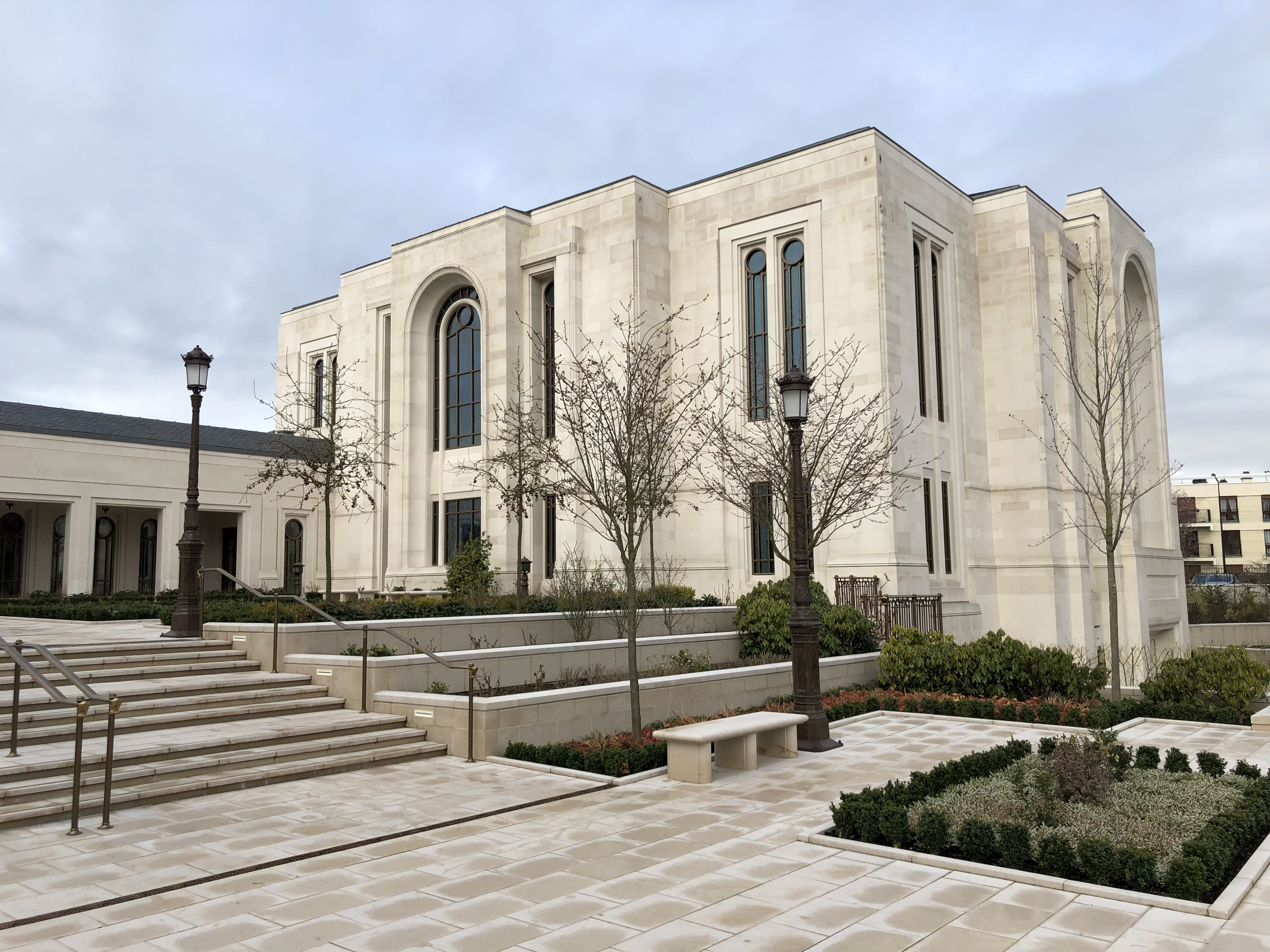
Temple courtyard

== See also ==
- List of temples of The Church of Jesus Christ of Latter-day Saints
- The Church of Jesus Christ of Latter-day Saints in France
