= Edward L. Sloan =

Irish publisher (1830–1874)

Edward Lennox Sloan (1830–1874) was a Latter-day Saint editor and publisher. He also was the arranger of the text of the hymn "For the Strength of the Hills" into the version currently contained in the hymnal of the Church of Jesus Christ of Latter-day Saints (LDS Church).

Sloan was born in Bangor, Ireland and was trained as a weaver. At some point in his teens, he joined the LDS Church. He was ordained an elder in the church at age 18 and then served as a missionary in Ireland, Wales, England and Scotland. At this time he published a volume of poetry he had written entitled The Bard's Offering.

In 1851, Sloan married Mary Wallace, who was also a native of Ireland.

After having served as editor of the Millennial Star, Sloan immigrated to Utah Territory in 1863. He crossed the ocean on the Amazon on which he served as the first counselor in the presidency over the Latter-day Saints on board.

In Utah, Sloan was the founder of the Salt Lake Daily Herald in 1870, which he ran with William C. Dunbar. When his efforts to get a column on women's issues included in the Herald were defeated by Dunbar, Sloan went ahead and organized the Woman's Exponent with Lula Greene as editor. Sloan also published the first city directory of Salt Lake City.

Sloan also served as secretary of the Deseret Sunday School Union at the time of its organization in 1872.

Prior to the founding of the Herald, Sloan had assisted George Q. Cannon in editing the Deseret News. He was also the recorder of many of the discourses included in the Journal of Discourses.

Sloan practiced plural marriage and had three wives and 15 children.
