= Intermountain Stock Exchange =

Defunct stock exchange

- Salt Lake Stock Exchange
- Type: Regional stock exchange
- Location: Salt Lake City, Utah, United States
- Founded: 1888
- Closed: 1972

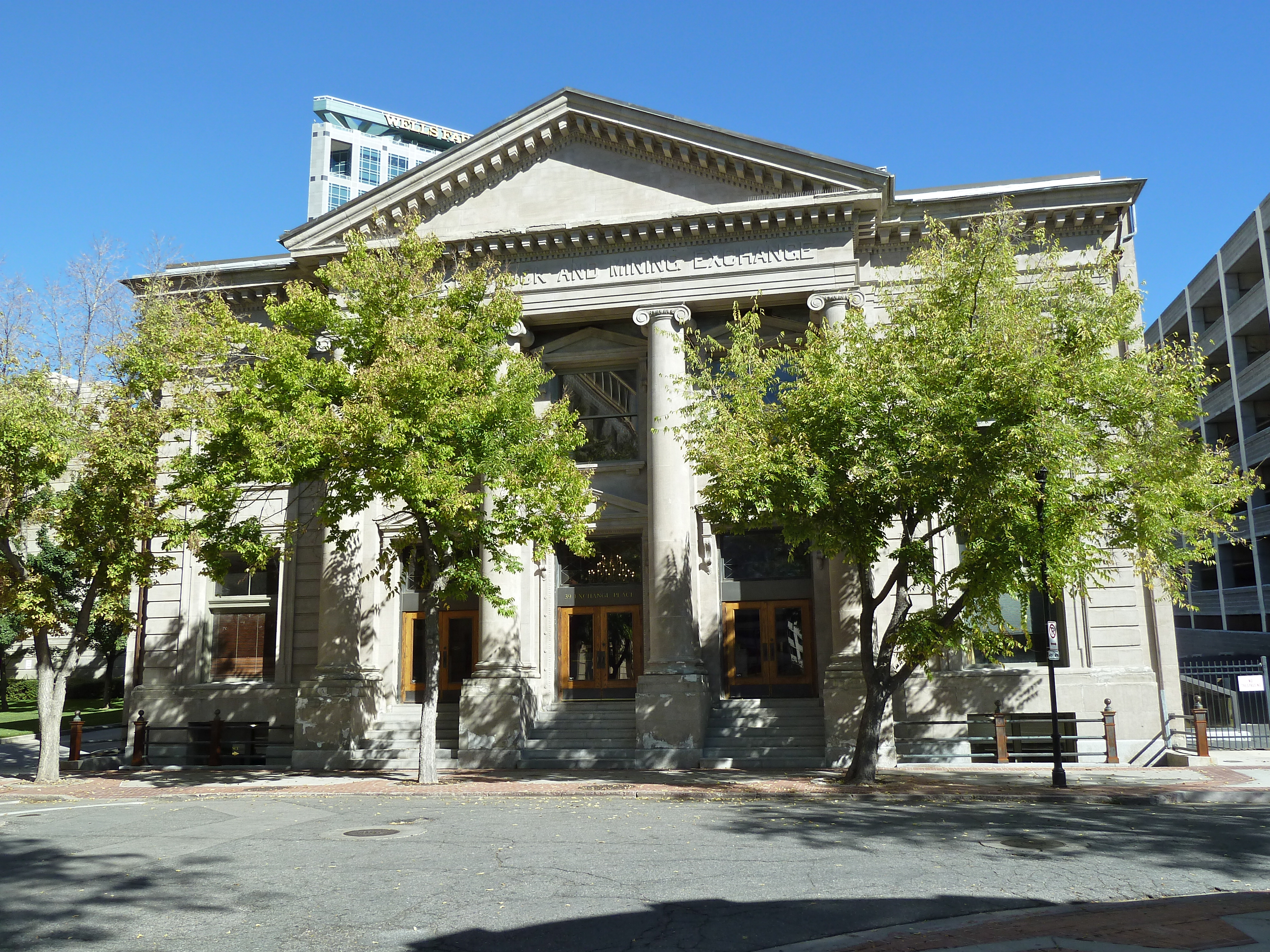
The Salt Lake Stock and Mining Exchange building

Intermountain Stock Exchange ("ISE") (formerly the Salt Lake Stock Exchange) is a defunct stock exchange that formerly operated in Salt Lake City, Utah. Named the Salt Lake Stock and Mining Exchange from its 1888 founding until 1972, the company was acquired by Commodity Exchange, Inc. (COMEX) in 1986, ceased operating and became dormant.

== History ==
The company was organized in 1888, and incorporated in 1899 as the Salt Lake Stock and Mining Exchange to provide capital for the area's mines. The property for the Exchange building at 39 Exchange Place in Salt Lake City was donated in 1908 by Utah mining magnate Samuel Newhouse. In 1900, future Salt Lake City mayor John S. Bransford was elected the president of the Salt Lake Stock and Mining Exchange. The Exchange had its largest trading volumes during the 1920s, and particularly during the uranium boom of the 1950s. The companies listed on the Exchange tended to be speculative oil and mining penny stocks.

The Exchange changed its name to Intermountain Stock Exchange in May 1972 to reflect a larger geographic area. At that time it was the second smallest exchange in the United States, next to the Spokane Stock Exchange. Despite renewed optimism by management, trading volumes continued to dwindle until the Exchange was acquired in 1986 and all ISE-listed securities were delisted. The company was acquired by Commodity Exchange, Inc. (COMEX) in 1986, ceased operating and became dormant.

== See also ==
- List of former stock exchanges in the Americas
- List of stock exchange mergers in the Americas
- Regional stock exchange
- List of stock exchanges
- Salt Lake Stock and Mining Exchange Building
