= Salt Lake Stock and Mining Exchange Building =

Historic building in Salt Lake City, Utah, U.S.

- U.S. National Register of Historic Places
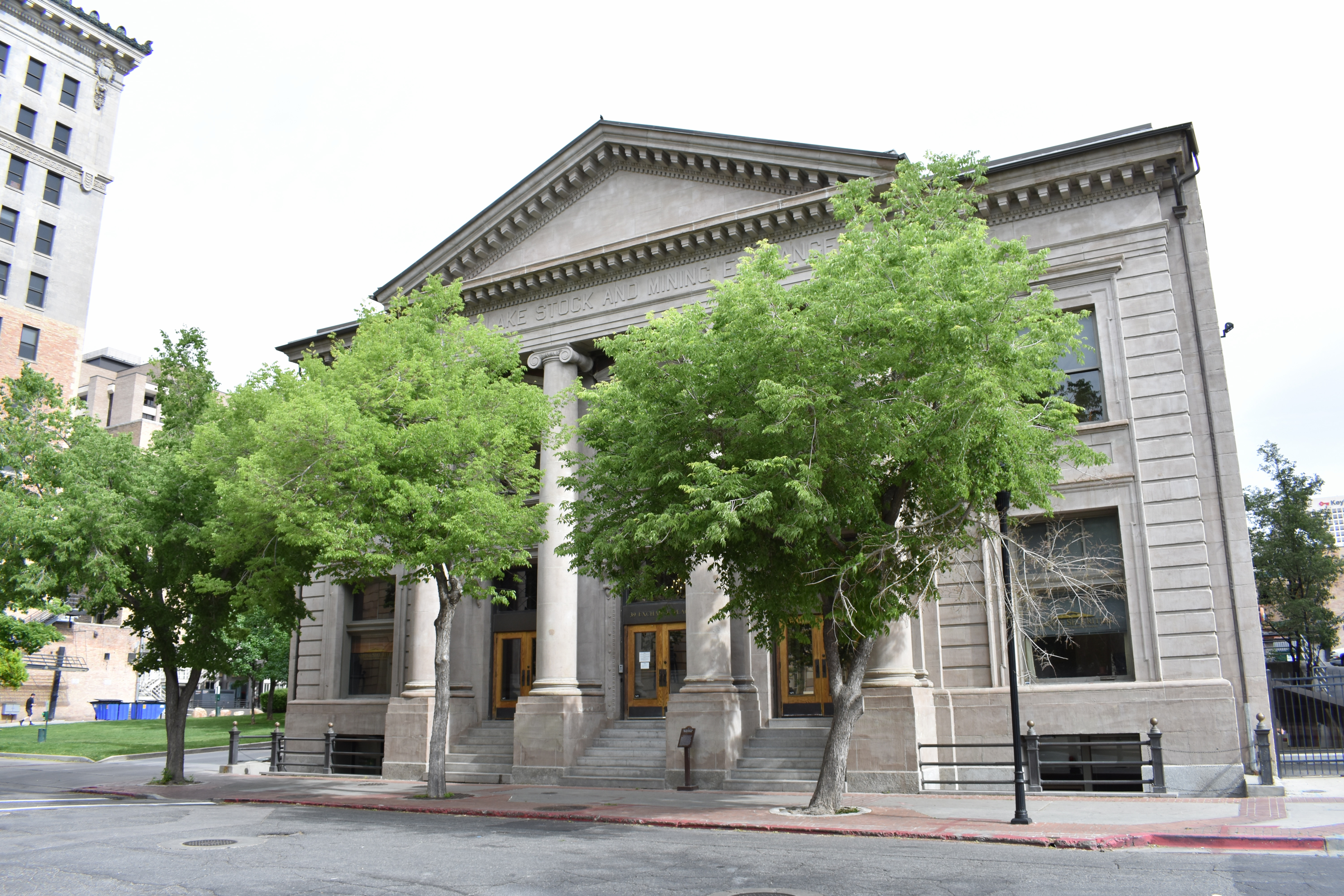
- The Salt Lake Stock and Mining Exchange Building in 2019

- Location within Utah Location within the United States
- Location: 39 Exchange Pl., Salt Lake City, Utah
- Coordinates: 40°45′42″N 111°53′21″W
- Area: less than one acre
- Built: 1908-09
- Architect: John C. Craig
- Architectural style: Classical Revival
- NRHP reference No.: 76001830
- Added to NRHP: July 30, 1976

The Salt Lake Stock and Mining Exchange Building in Salt Lake City, Utah, is a 2-story Classical Revival building designed by John C. Craig and constructed in 1909. The sandstone, brick, and cement building that housed the Salt Lake Stock and Mining Exchange includes four large Ionic columns supporting a pediment above a denticulated cornice, and the pedimental imagery is reflected in lintels above the six central door and window fenestrations. The building was added to the National Register of Historic Places in 1976. It is also a contributing resource in the Exchange Place Historic District.

The Salt Lake Stock and Mining Exchange Building was constructed on a site donated by Samuel Newhouse in 1908. Newhouse intended to develop a major financial center that would rival other exchanges in larger cities, and some members of the Salt Lake financial community did not support a shift from the 19th century roots of the exchange. During construction of the new exchange building, a competing exchange was organized and operated briefly in the Atlas Block (demolished) under the name, Utah Stock and Mining Exchange. The Salt Lake Stock and Mining Exchange occupied its new building from 1909 until the exchange became defunct in 1986. In 1972 the exchange was renamed the Intermountain Stock Exchange.
