= Penmark =

Village in the Vale of Glamorgan, Wales

Coordinates: 51.41078°N 3.35507°W

Penmark: Welsh: Pen-marc
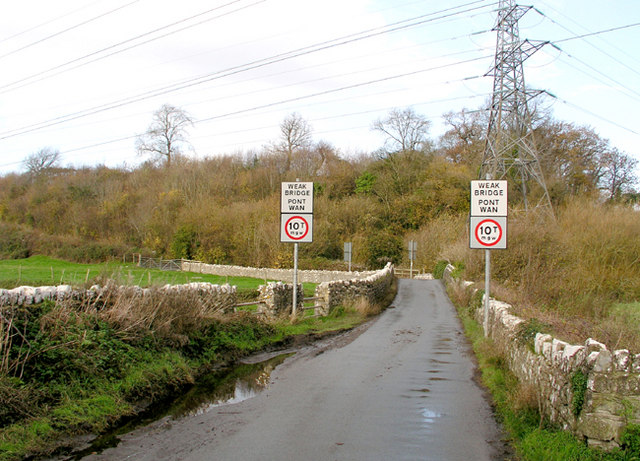

- Location within the Vale of Glamorgan
- OS grid reference: ST058688
- Community: Rhoose
- Principal area: Vale of Glamorgan
- Preserved county: South Glamorgan
- Country: Wales
- Sovereign state: United Kingdom
- Post town: Barry
- Postcode district: CF62
- Dialling code: 01446
- Police: South Wales
- Fire: South Wales
- Ambulance: Welsh
- UK Parliament: Vale of Glamorgan

Penmark (Welsh: Pen-marc) is a rural village south-west of Barry near Rhoose in the Vale of Glamorgan, in South Wales. The village is a parish and is a linear village. It has a parish church along the main road running through the village.

Penmark is located near the international airport for Wales, Cardiff International Airport.

== Penmark Castle ==
The village has the remains of a 13th-century castle.

== Gallery ==
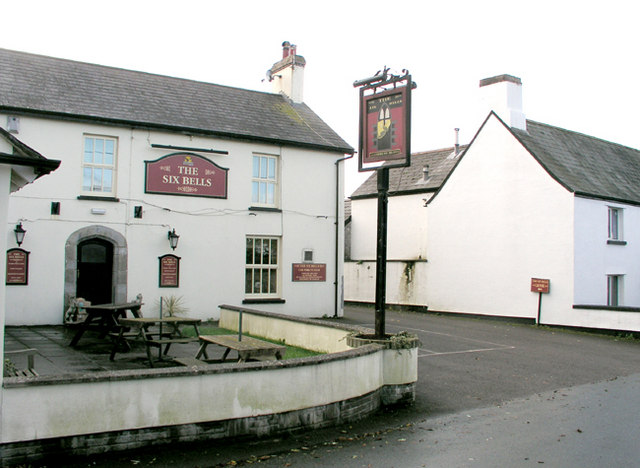
Six Bells Pub

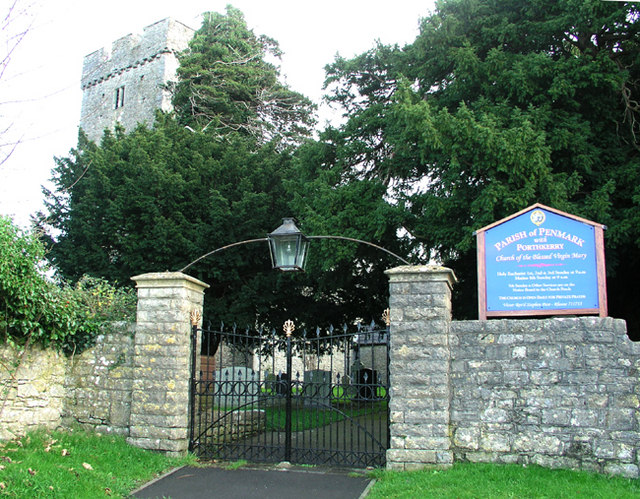
Penmark Church

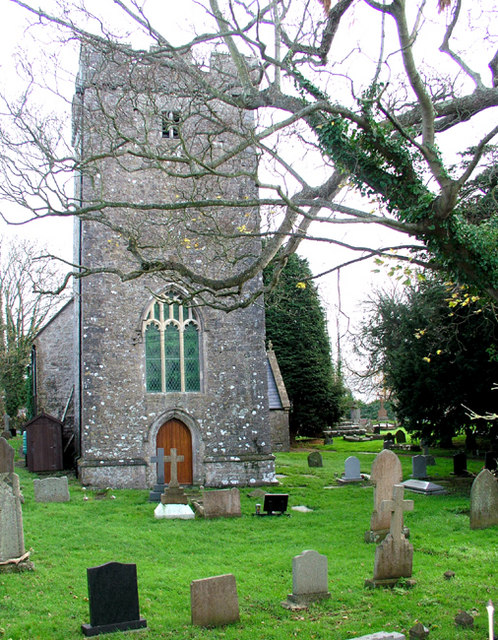
Penmark Church

== See also ==
- William Howells, the first Mormon missionary in France
