= Salt Lake Daily Herald =

Newspaper published in Salt Lake City, Utah

- The January 1, 1880 edition of the Salt Lake Daily Herald
- Type: Daily newspaper
- Founder(s): William C. Dunbar; Edward L. Sloan
- Founded: 1870
- Ceased publication: 1920
- Language: English
- Headquarters: Herald Building (Salt Lake City)
- City: Salt Lake City, Utah
- OCLC number: 12099350

The Salt Lake Daily Herald was a daily newspaper in Salt Lake City, Utah. It may also be known as the Salt Lake Herald or Salt Lake City Herald. The paper was published from 1870 to 1920, and was succeeded by the Telegram, which ceased in 1952.

== History ==
On June 5, 1870, William C. Dunbar and Edward L. Sloan published the first edition of the morning Salt Lake Herald. On September 1, 1870, John T. Caine bought an interest in the business. Sloan continued as editor and Dunbar worked as business manager. On August 3, 1874, Sloan died at age 43.

In July 1901, business manager William Iglehart acquired the Herald with the financial backing of William A. Clark from Alfred W. McCune and the estate of R. C. Chambers. In January 1908, Clark sold the Herald to Samuel Newhouse and Col. E.A. Will. In July 1909, Daniel C. Jackling and the other owners of the Inter-mountain Republican purchased the Herald and merged the two papers to form the Salt Lake Herald Republican.

In February 1918, the owners of the Salt Lake Telegram leased the Herald Republican and its printing plant. The two plants and papers were consolidated to form the Salt Lake Herald-Republican-Telegram. That July, the Herald Republican owners ended the lease agreement and relaunched the paper. James P. Casey soon became general manager and the paper was renamed to The Herald.

In February 1920, the Herald owners acquired the Telegram, and merged the two under the Telegram masthead. In September 1930, company president Arthur L. Fish announced the paper had been acquired by the Kearns family, owners of The Salt Lake Tribune. In August 1952, the Telegram was acquired by the Deseret News and absorbed into that paper.

== See also ==
- Daily Herald (Utah)
- List of newspapers in Utah
