= Harrison New York Temple =

Suspended construction of LDS Church temple

- Efforts suspended in 2006
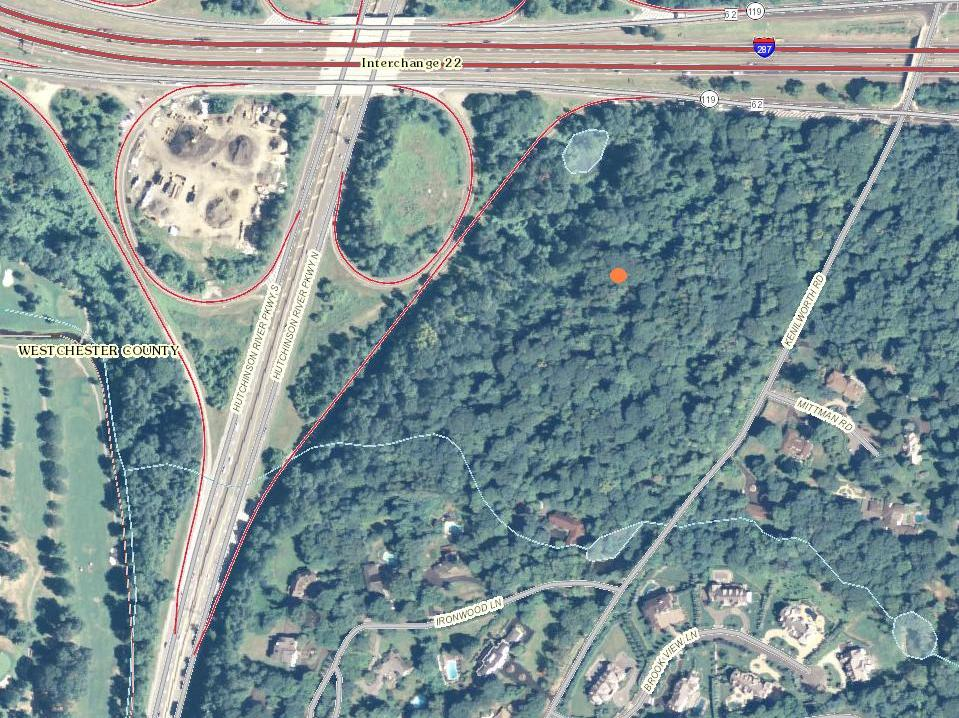
- 24-acre temple location site
- Interactive map of Harrison New York Temple
- Site: 24 acres (9.7 ha)
- Floor area: 28,400 ft^{2} (2,640 m^{2})
- • News & images

Additional information
- Announced: September 30, 1995, by Gordon B. Hinckley
- Location: Harrison, New York, U.S.
- Coordinates: 41°0′45.88″N 73°42′49.58″W
- Notes: Originally named the White Plains New York Temple the temple was renamed as the Harrison New York Temple. Along with the Boston Massachusetts Temple, it was to be built instead of the Hartford Connecticut Temple announced in October 1992. Reportedly, efforts were still underway in 2004, though delayed by lawsuits and objections by local officials. According to a Deseret News article about the Manhattan Temple. However, this temple was removed from the list on the Church's official temple website soon after the dedication of the Manhattan New York Temple.

The Harrison New York Temple, previously known as the White Plains New York Temple, was a planned temple of the Church of Jesus Christ of Latter-day Saints (LDS Church) that was to be constructed in Harrison, New York. Construction of the temple was to take place on a 24-acre site purchased by the LDS Church at the intersection of Interstate 287 and Hutchinson River Parkway. Reportedly, efforts had been underway until 2004, but construction was never started and eventually suspended. After delays by lawsuits and objections by local officials, this temple was removed from the list on the LDS Church's official temple website soon after the dedication of the Manhattan New York Temple. Any decision to build a temple on this site would constitute a new announcement.

== History ==
On Saturday, October 3, 1992, during the afternoon session of the church's 162nd Semiannual general conference, Gordon B. Hinckley, at the time First Counselor in the First Presidency, announced plans for the Hartford Connecticut Temple. However, three years later, plans for this temple were replaced with plans for the Boston Massachusetts Temple and the White Plains New York Temple (later to be renamed the Harrison New York Temple).

=== Lot purchase ===
On March 8, 1996, the LDS Church purchased a 24-acre site for the temple at the intersection of Interstate 287 and Hutchinson River Parkway. The location of the site in Harrison was reflected in a name change, renaming the White Plains New York Temple as the Harrison New York Temple. The name change was made during a major renaming of many of the church's temples to a uniform guidelines in October 1999.

=== Legal issues ===
Plans for a 44-foot-high temple came before the Harrison Zoning Board of Appeals on Thursday, September 28, 2000. The temple's height required the church to apply for a variance to the 30-foot height limit. In a 5–2 vote, the Board denied the variance.

On March 10, 2001, New York State Supreme Court Justice Peter Leavitt overturned the decision of the Harrison Board of Appeals and ordered a variance to be issued to allow construction of the temple. The Board countered by filing its own appeal. Despite the pending lawsuit, the church attended a public meeting with the Harrison Town Board on June 11, 2001. The church requested a special exception permit, which specified how the temple would be used. Overwhelming opposition was expressed by neighbors, including concerns over traffic, size of the building, height of the steeple, and nighttime flood lighting of the exterior.

This meeting started eight months of negotiations between the church and residents. This included public hearings, four traffic studies, and environmental reports. Having exhausted any administrative options, the church filed suit on December 17, 2001, accusing the town of infringing on freedom of religion and assembly.

On April 30, 2002, members of the Harrison Town Board then voted unanimously to approve a proposed settlement with the church. It appeared that the town would likely lose in court and spend millions of dollars if legal action were pursued. The agreement resulted in numerous concessions by the church. This included, but was not limited to, reducing the building size, height and capacity.

=== Plans suspended ===
The seven-year dispute contributed to the decision by the church to build the Manhattan New York Temple inside an existing church-owned building. The church had not indicated how the opening of the temple in Manhattan would affect the temple in Harrison. James Staudt, a White Plains lawyer representing the church said "It will be built." He explained that the church was working to connect the property to a sewer line and that, once completed, the church would move on to the next phase of construction.

However, by 2006, after the temple opened in Manhattan, work at the Harrison site stopped and the Harrison New York Temple was removed from the church's official list of announced temples.

== See also ==
- Comparison of temples of The Church of Jesus Christ of Latter-day Saints
- List of temples of The Church of Jesus Christ of Latter-day Saints
- List of temples of The Church of Jesus Christ of Latter-day Saints by geographic region
- Temple architecture (LDS Church)
