= Robert S. Wood =

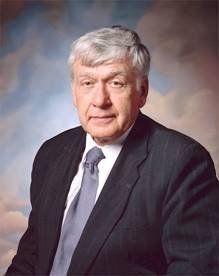

Second Quorum of the Seventy
- April 3, 1999 – October 3, 2009
- Called by: Gordon B. Hinckley
- End reason: Honorably released

Personal details
- Born: December 25, 1936 (age 88); Idaho Falls, Idaho, United States

Robert S. Wood (born December 25, 1936) has had a career in the dual areas of state and religion, both as a leader and advisor to senior civilian and military officials of the United States Government in the area of National security affairs, and as a leader in the Church of Jesus Christ of Latter-day Saints (LDS Church).

== Personal life ==
The youngest of four children, Wood was born in Idaho Falls, Idaho, to Blanche and John Albert (Jack) Wood. He was baptized as a child, received the Aaronic priesthood in his youth, and the Melchizedek priesthood as a young man. He was selected as a delegate from Idaho to the international YMCA Centennial Conference, traveling from Canada, through the Panama Canal, and throughout Europe.

After high school, Wood began studies at Stanford University, where he met Dixie Leigh Jones. He served in the French Mission from 1957 to 1959, and when he returned to the United States to complete his degree in history, he and Dixie began dating. He recalls, "Probably the most significant question she asked after we had been dating for a while was when she looked me straight in the eye and said, 'Robert, are you going to stay active?' " His answer was clear, and they were married in the Idaho Falls Temple on 27 March 1961.

At Stanford, Wood became interested in international affairs, particularly European affairs. While he was writing his honors thesis he came across the book, A World Restored, by Henry Kissinger. Because of the impact the book had on him, he applied to Harvard, to study at the school where Kissinger was teaching.

The Woods are the parents of four daughters and the grandparents of thirteen grandchildren. According to Wood, "Two things explain our family … First, Heavenly Father just sent us four terrific kids. And second, their mother … I would never have been able to do anything that I've done professionally or in the Church had I not married the right woman who asked the question, 'Are you going to stay active?'"

== National Security Affairs ==
Wood was the holder of the Chester W. Nimitz Chair of National Security at the United States Naval War College in Newport, Rhode Island, where he also served as Dean of the Chief of Naval Operations Strategic Studies Group, and Dean (later, Dean Emeritus) of the Center for Naval Warfare Studies, a focal point of strategic and campaign thought in the naval services and a major research group in the national security field.

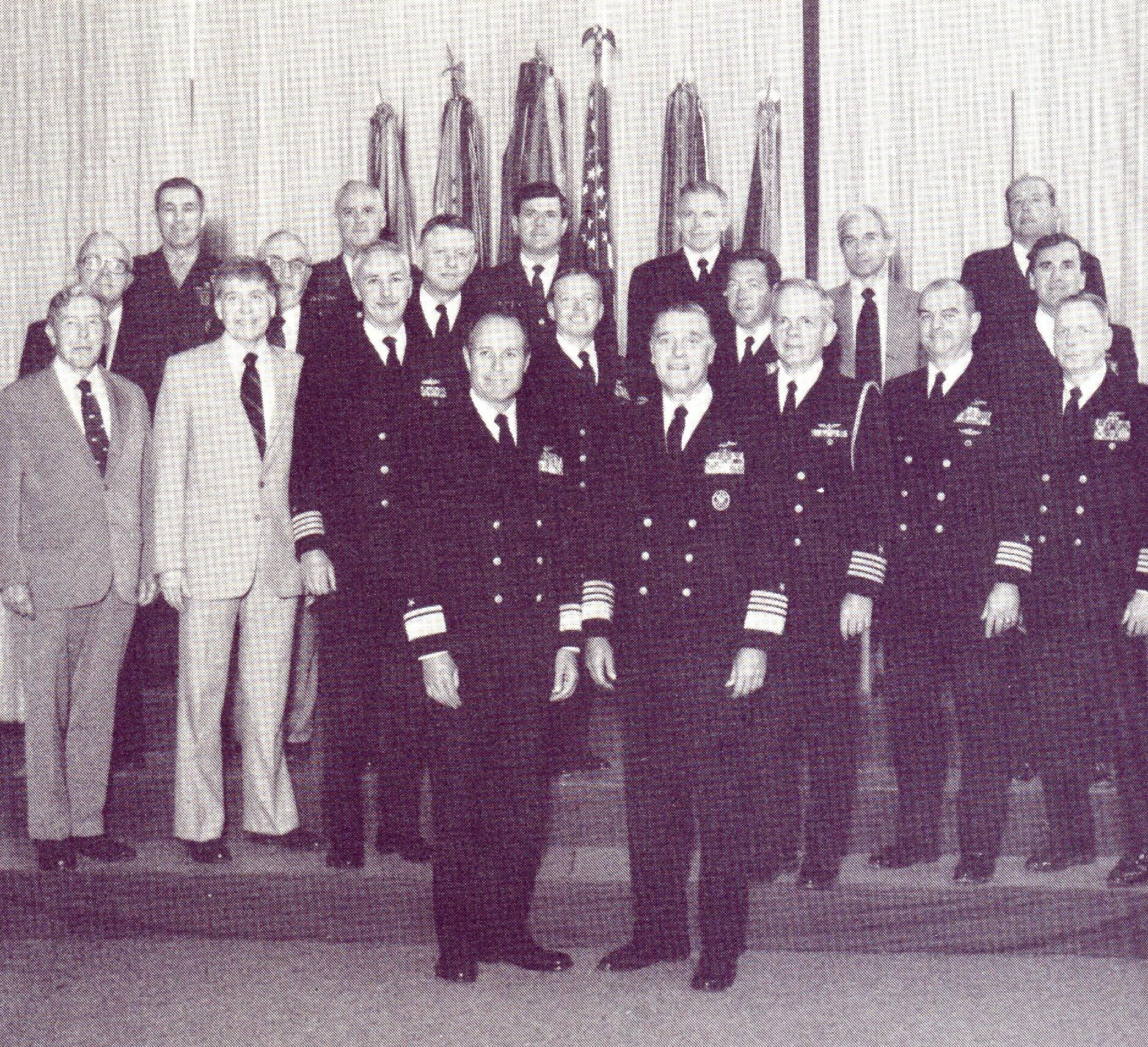
Naval War College Strategic Studies Group (Chief of Naval Operations's "Thinktank"), May 1984. Front Row, left to right: Rear Admiral James Service, NWC President, and Admiral James D. Watkins, CNO. Robert Wood, Dean of Naval Warfare Studies: second row, second from left.

As part of his responsibilities at the Naval War College, and to the larger military and civilian infrastructure, he has directed war gaming, research, and analysis, for decision makers at the senior levels of the U.S. government, earning his reputation as one of the world's leading authorities on gaming and simulations as an aid to decision-making. After serving as Dean of the Naval War College Strategy Department from 1980 to 1983 Wood was appointed as Dean of the Center for Naval Warfare Studies in 1983. During his time in this position, the four elements of the Center - wargaming, advanced research, the Strategic Studies Group, and the Naval War College Press-- "were integrated to become the Chief of Naval Operations's think tank of first resort." During this period, in his capacity as Director of the Center for Naval Warfare Studies, he oversaw the largest gaming series in U.S. history, "The Global War Games" which included hundreds of senior military and civilian leaders who came together for a two- to three-week period to explore conflict and crisis scenarios, and to explore alternative strategies, policies, and operational plans. During the course of his career he has provided advice on a number of occasions to the White House, the Congress, and the Department of Defense, and represent the United States in meetings with Soviet and British officials during the Cold War.

Wood received a bachelor's degree in history from Stanford University and master's and Ph.D. in political science from Harvard University. In addition to teaching the Naval War College, Wood has held faculty positions at Harvard University, Bentley College, the University of Virginia, the University of Tilburg and the University of Groningen. Additionally, he has served as visiting professor and lecturer at many prominent universities and institutions at home and abroad, and has been a frequent lecturer at the National Defense University and at all of the U.S. Military Senior Service Schools, the NATO Defense College, and the Federal Executive Institute. He has also authored, co-authored, edited, or contributed to 21 other books and numerous articles on public affairs, executive development, international affairs, and national security policy.

== LDS Church service ==
From 1957 to 1959, Wood served as a missionary in the church's French Mission. Prior to his call as a general authority, his other church leadership positions included area seventy, regional representative, stake president, and bishop. In April 1999, he was appointed as a general authority, serving in the Second Quorum of the Seventy, at the church's general conference in Salt Lake City, Utah. His assignments included being sent to South America, where he was responsible for overseeing social, humanitarian and ecclesiastical affairs for Northern Brazil.

In 2009, Wood was called as president of the Boston Massachusetts Temple, succeeding Kenneth G. Hutchins. His wife, Dixie Jones Wood, served as temple matron. He held this position until 2012.

Wood has represented the LDS Church in many interfaith organizations and events, including the Council on Foreign Relations (CFR) Religious Advisory Committee.

== Views ==
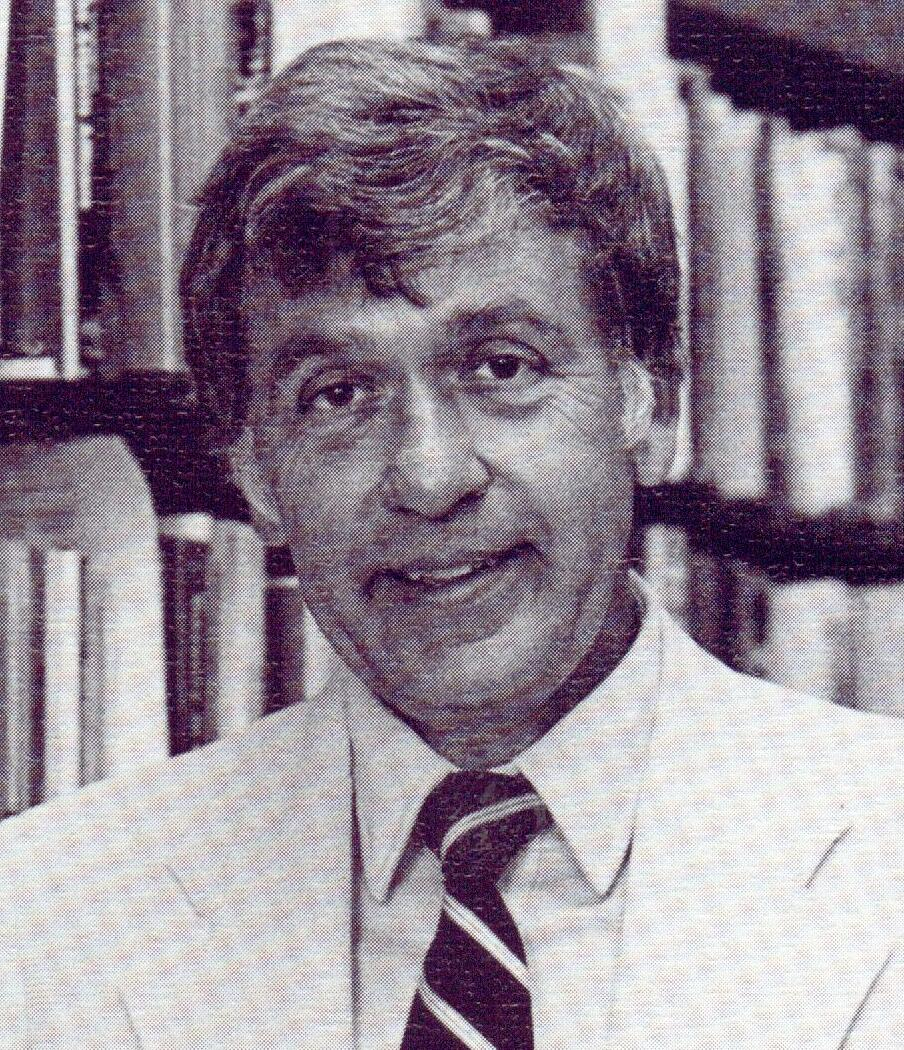
Wood at the Naval War College, 1985.

Wood's career, both in church and state, was based on his strong belief that the United States was the model for the world in terms of how a separation of church and state — no state run or state established church — was good for both the church and the state, allowing a variety of religions to flourish. Speaking at the Toronto-based Center for New Religions, Wood said that the freedom of conscience and assembly allowed under such a system has led to a "remarkable religiosity" in the United States that isn't present in other industrialized nations.

Wood believes that the U.S. operates on "a sort of civic religion," which includes a generally shared belief in a creator who "expects better of us." Beyond that, individuals are free to decide how they want to believe and fill in their own creeds and express their conscience. He calls this approach the "genius of religious sentiment in the United States."

== Works ==
- Wood, Robert S. (2007). The Complete Christian. Deseret Book. ISBN 978-1-59038-750-4. OCLC 85766155. ISBN 1-59038-750-3
- Boyer, Pelham G.; Wood, Robert S., eds. (1998). Strategic Transformation and Naval Power in the 21st Century. Naval War College Press. ISBN 1-884733-11-5. OCLC 39538962. ISBN 978-1-884733-11-6.
- Fry, Earl H.; Taylor, Stan A.; Wood, Robert S. (1994). America the Vincible: U.S. Foreign Policy for the 21st Century. Englewood Cliffs: Prentice Hall. ISBN 978-0-13-028457-0. OCLC 28547121.
- Wood, Robert S. (2002) [1990]. Shuman, Howard E; Thomas, Walter R (eds.). "The Constitution, Congressional Government, and the Imperial Republic". The Constitution and National Security: A Bicentennial View. University Press of the Pacific [National Defense University Press]: 73–89. ISBN 978-0-89875-920-4. OCLC 60547677.

== Notes and references ==
- 2008 Deseret Morning News Church Almanac (Salt Lake City, Utah: Deseret Morning News, 2007) p. 59
