= L'Étoile du Déséret =

French newspaper of the Church of Jesus Christ of Latter-day Saints

L'Étoile du Déséret (French pronunciation: [letwal dy dezeʁɛ], "The Star of Deseret") was a monthly French language newspaper published in France by Church of Jesus Christ of Latter-day Saints apostle John Taylor beginning in May 1851 and was printed in Paris. It continued until April 1852. On August 22, 1852, Taylor discussed the newspaper in his European mission report delivered in Salt Lake City, Utah Territory:

We also publish there a paper called L'Étoile du Déséret (The Star of Deseret.) It is got up in good style, and printed in new type. It is also stereotyped, and most of it is new matter. I have given an account of the organization of the Church, and a brief history of it; of the coming forth of the Book of Mormon, and the evidences of it; of the doctrines of the Church, and the position of things in this country, &c., &c. These are some of the leading items of this publication. Instead of filling it with the news of the day, we have filled it with all that is good for the people to read, that it may be a standing work for years to come. It contains articles written on baptism, the Gift of the Holy Ghost, the necessity of gathering together, and all the leading points associated with the religion we believe in, that there may be evidence forthcoming at anytime and place, in the hands of the inquirer. If men should be there, not acquainted with the language, and individuals should make inquiries of them relating to the doctrines of their religion, they have nothing to do but hand them this Number or that Number of the "Star of Deseret", containing the information they wish. This will save them a great deal of trouble in talking.

== See also ==
- List of Latter Day Saint periodicals
- Louis A. Bertrand
