= Levi Richards =

American physician

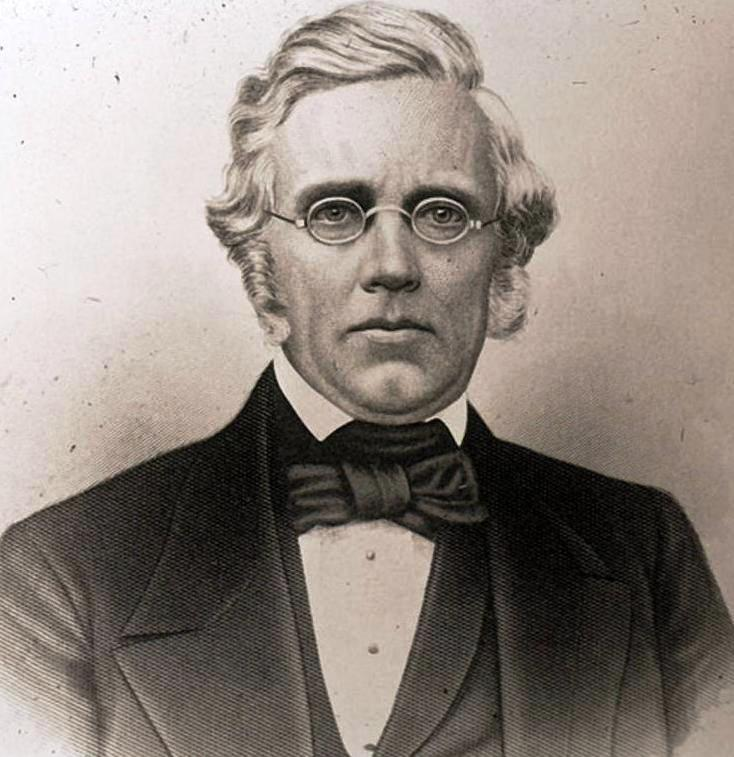

Physician for Joseph Smith

Member of the Council of Fifty

Personal details
- Born: April 14, 1799; Hopkinton, Massachusetts, United States
- Died: June 18, 1876 (aged 77); Salt Lake City, Utah Territory, United States
- Resting place: Salt Lake City Cemetery; 40.7772°N 111.8580°W
- Signature

Levi Richards (April 14, 1799 – June 18, 1876) was an early leader in the Latter Day Saint movement and a missionary for the Church of Jesus Christ of Latter-day Saints. He was a member of the Council of Fifty and Anointed Quorum and served as a medical doctor for movement founder Joseph Smith and others during the years the Latter Day Saints were established in Nauvoo, Illinois. Richards was an older brother of church apostle Willard Richards.

Levi Richards was born in Hopkinton, Massachusetts and trained as a botanical physician. He joined the Church of the Latter Day Saints in 1836 and moved to Kirtland, Ohio to join the main gathering of Latter Day Saints.

In the late 1830s, Richards served as a counselor to Joseph Fielding in the presidency of the church's British Mission. In 1840, Richards was still serving as a missionary in the British Mission.

Richards married Sarah Griffith on December 25, 1843, with Brigham Young performing the marriage.

Richards served as a member of the Nauvoo City Council.

Richards served another mission in Britain from 1848 to 1853 along with his wife. They left their only child, Levi W. Richards, in care of family members on the advice of Brigham Young. For part of this mission, the Richards served in Wales, which was where Sarah Griffith had been born. For part of this time Richards served as the general supervisor of missionary work in Wales, which for all intents and purposes made him the mission president in Wales.

After completing their mission, the Richards returned to the United States and headed on Utah Territory where they joined their son Levi W., who was by this time eight years old. Richards lived for several years in downtown Salt Lake City on the block where Crossroads Plaza Mall was later built. In the early 1870s, he moved to the Avenues area of Salt Lake City. He became a patriarch in the church in 1873, and died at Salt Lake City on June 18, 1876.
