= Louis A. Bertrand =

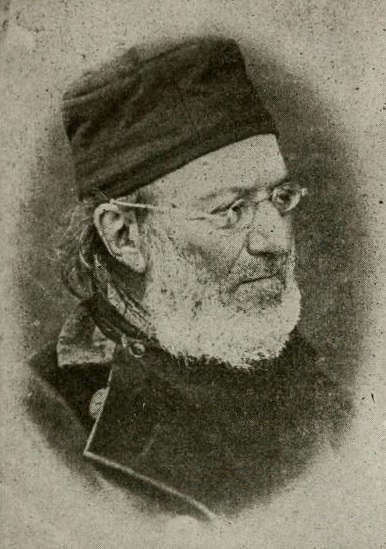

Louis Auguste Bertrand (French pronunciation: [lwi oɡyst bɛʁtʁɑ̃]; January 8, 1808 – March 21, 1875), born John Francis Elias Flandin, was an early leader of the Church of Jesus Christ of Latter-day Saints (LDS Church) in France.

Bertrand was born near Marseilles, France. He early went into trade and traveled abroad. In 1848, he was in Paris and a member of the Revolutionary Committee of 1848. He was then sent into prison for three months. At this time he changed his name to protect his wife and child.

After the revolution Bertrand edited Le Populaire. In 1850, he met John Taylor and shortly thereafter was baptized a member of the LDS Church. He then worked on the translation of the Book of Mormon into French.

Bertrand was involved in the publication of the church periodical L'Etoile du Deseret. In 1853, he was serving as a missionary in Jersey. While there he taught Victor Hugo, but in Bertrand's assessment Hugo was "too full of revolution to think much about the gospel of Jesus Christ". Despite earnest efforts, the work began to decline after 1855 under the pressure of continual political turmoil. Laws under Louis Napoleon hampered publication and limited the size of public gatherings; police were instructed to be especially vigilant in routing Mormon meetings. Louis Bertrand wrote an appeal for tolerance to the emperor, but, as Bertrand reported later, "His majesty read my address, laughed at it and tore it to pieces." Not many French were receptive to the gospel message, and the few converts there were mostly resident aliens.

In 1855 Bertrand emigrated to Utah Territory. In 1859, he returned to France as the LDS Church mission president. In 1863, Bertrand wrote Brigham Young that the French were "every one spiritually dead," and although he stayed for another year to "prepare the ground" for a time when better conditions would favor missionary work, he left in 1864 for Utah. With his departure the mission was officially closed for forty-eight years. His wife did not join the LDS Church and remained in France. Bertrand died in the Salt Lake City Insane Asylum on March 21, 1875. Deseret News, March 24, 1875, "Local and Other Matters."
