= William C. Dunbar =

William Cameron Dunbar (26 October 1822 – 8 June 1905) was a Scottish Mormon missionary and a Mormon pioneer. He was one of the first missionaries of the Church of Jesus Christ of Latter-day Saints (LDS Church) in France and one of the first in Jersey.

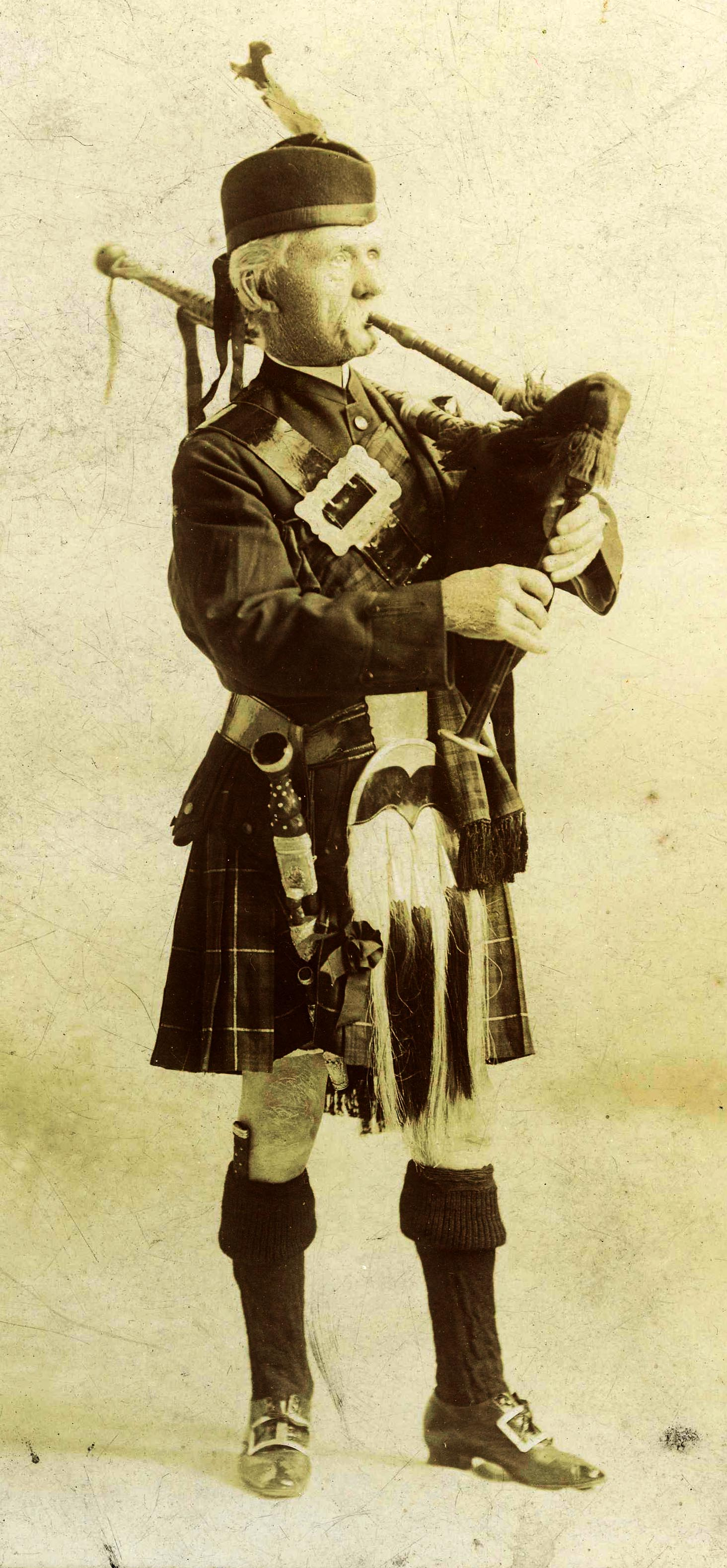
William Cameron Dunbar, Salt Lake City, UT, ca. 1880s

Dunbar was born in Inverness, Scotland. He became a Latter Day Saint in 1840 and was a missionary for the LDS Church in England and France from 1846 to 1852. In 1849, he joined William Howells and his daughter in France and thus became the third Mormon missionary to preach in that country. On his way to France, Dunbar stopped to preach in Jersey, reporting that when he arrived there were 44 Latter Day Saints, and that he baptized an additional 60.

At the conclusion of his mission, in 1852, Dunbar immigrated to Utah Territory. His wife and 2 children were killed en route, and he was injured, when their steamboat on the Missouri River, the Saluda, suffered an explosion of its steam engine. He became a Seventy in the LDS Church and was sent back to France to be the mission president in 1854 and 1855.

Dunbar was one of the founding publishers of the Salt Lake Herald and was a popular comedian, vocalist, and bagpiper in Utah. He died in Salt Lake City, Utah.
