= Boston Massachusetts Temple =

Temple of the LDS Church

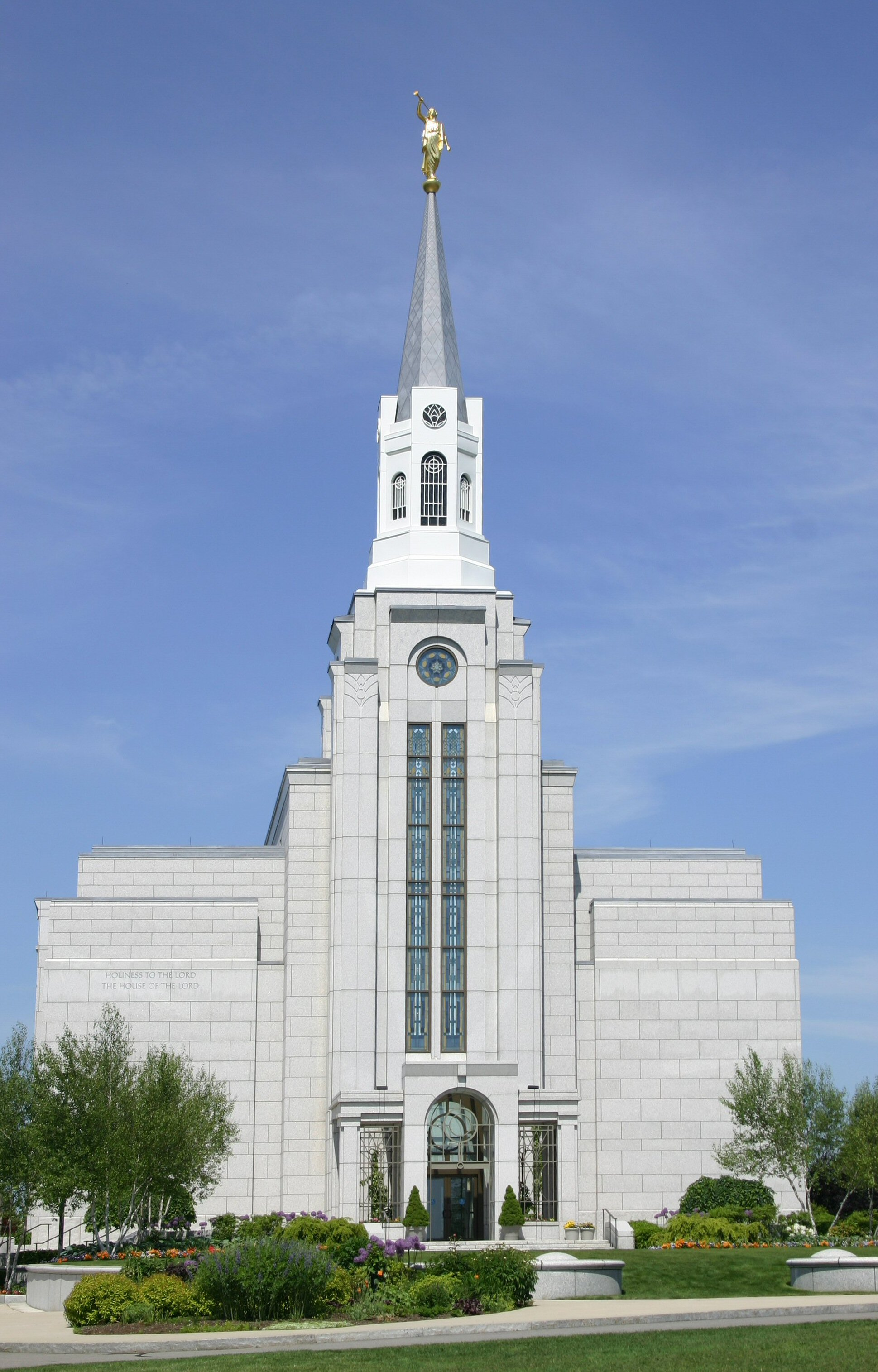
- Interactive map of Boston Massachusetts Temple
- Number: 100
- Dedication: October 1, 2000, by Gordon B. Hinckley
- Site: 8 acres (3.2 ha)
- Floor area: 69,600 ft^{2} (6,470 m^{2})
- Height: 139 ft (42 m)
- Official website • News & images

Church chronology
← Santo Domingo Dominican Republic Temple	Boston Massachusetts Temple	→ Recife Brazil Temple

Additional information
- Announced: September 30, 1995, by Gordon B. Hinckley
- Groundbreaking: June 13, 1997, by Richard G. Scott
- Open house: August 29 – September 23, 2000
- Current president: Kevin B. Rollins
- Designed by: Tsoi/Kobus & Associates and Church A&E Services
- Location: Belmont, Massachusetts, United States
- Coordinates: 42°24′43.20720″N 71°11′17.1276″W
- Exterior finish: Olympia white granite
- Design: Classic modern, single-spire design
- Baptistries: 1
- Ordinance rooms: 4 (two-stage progressive)
- Sealing rooms: 4
- Clothing rental: Yes

The Boston Massachusetts Temple is the 100th operating temple of the Church of Jesus Christ of Latter-day Saints (LDS Church).

The intent to build the temple was announced on September 30, 1995, by church president Gordon B. Hinckley during the church's general conference. The temple was the first to be built in Massachusetts.

The temple has a single attached end spire with a statue of the angel Moroni. The temple reflects a classic New England influence. A groundbreaking ceremony, to signify the beginning of construction, was held on June 13, 1997, conducted by Richard G. Scott of the church's Quorum of the Twelve Apostles.

== History ==
The Boston Massachusetts Temple is located in the suburb of Belmont, Massachusetts and was dedicated on October 1, 2000. When church president Hinckley announced the building of smaller temples in April 1998, he also spoke of a goal to have 100 temples built by the end of 2000. The Boston Massachusetts Temple marked the completion of that goal.

Richard G. Scott presided over the groundbreaking on June 13, 1997, and the building was completed three years later. About 82,600 visitors toured the temple during an open house prior to its dedication. A local radio station and newspaper working together produced the first on-line tours of a temple. It included narration accompanied by photographs of the temple's interior.

Because of a lawsuit filed by neighbors of the temple site, the temple was dedicated without the planned steeple. Hinckley remained optimistic and said the temple work would commence with or without a steeple. The Supreme Court of Massachusetts ruled in favor of the church the following May. Previously, a judge had ruled that the building's steeple was not a "necessary element of the Mormon religion." Therefore, under the law the building height limit could be enforced. But the Supreme Court overruled the earlier ruling saying, "A rose window at Notre Dame Cathedral, a balcony at St. Peter's Basilica, are judges to decide whether these architectural elements are 'necessary' to the faith served by those buildings?" The judges concluded that, "It is not for judges to determine whether the inclusion of a particular architectural feature is 'necessary' for a particular religion." On September 21, 2001, the steeple, including the angel Moroni statue was set in place, completing the temple.

The Boston Massachusetts Temple is large relative to many other Latter-day Saint temples, with a total of 69,600 square feet (6,470 m^{2}), four ordinance rooms, and four sealing rooms. The exterior is finished with olympia white granite.

In 2020, like all the others in the church, the Boston Massachusetts Temple was closed in response to the COVID-19 pandemic.

Temples in the Northeastern United States
- = Operating
- = Under construction
- = Announced
- = Temporarily Closed

== Design and architecture ==
The building has a classic New England-inspired architectural style, coupled with a traditional Latter-day Saint temple design. The temple's architecture reflects both the cultural heritage of the Boston area and the spiritual significance to the church.

=== Site ===
The temple sits on an 8-acre plot, and the landscaping around the temple features trees and walking paths. These elements are designed to provide a tranquil setting that enhances the sacred atmosphere of the site.

=== Exterior ===
The structure stands 139 feet tall, constructed with Olympia white granite. The exterior includes a single spire topped with a statue of the angel Moroni, chosen for their symbolism and consistent with temple traditions. The exterior also features blue stained-glass windows. The design includes elements that reflect both local culture and church symbolism.

=== Interior ===
The interior design has a classic New England style and color scheme, with “light carpet and marble floors, crystal chandeliers, and finely crafted, light-colored woodwork.” The temple is centered around the baptistry, which is designed to foster a spiritually uplifting environment. In addition to the baptistry, the temple includes four ordinance rooms, four sealing rooms, and a celestial room, each arranged for ceremonial use.

=== Symbols ===
The design has elements representing Latter-day Saint symbolism to provide spiritual meaning to the temple's appearance and function. Symbolism is an important subject to church members, including the steeple. In an interview with the Boston Globe, Gordon B. Hinckley said that the temple’s steeple “represents an upward reach to heaven. It carries with it the spirit and attitude of looking heavenward.”

== Temple presidents ==
The church's temples are each directed by a temple president and matron, each serving for a term of three years. The president and matron oversee the administration of temple operations and provide guidance and training for both temple patrons and staff.

The first president of the Boston Massachusetts Temple was Loren C. Dunn, with the matron being Sharon L. Dunn. They served from 2000 to 2001. As of 2024, Lee R. LaPierre is the president, with Dorothy U. LaPierre serving as matron. Other notable presidents include Robert S. Wood (2009–12) and Steven C. Wheelwright (2015–2018).

== Admittance ==
Upon completion of the temple, the church announced that a public open house would be held from August 23-September 29, 2000 (excluding Sundays). Around 72,000 people visited the temple during the open house. The temple was dedicated by Gordon B. Hinckley in four sessions on October 1, 2000. Like all the church's temples, it is not used for Sunday worship services. To members of the church, temples are regarded as sacred houses of the Lord. Once dedicated, only church members with a current temple recommend can enter for worship.

== See also ==
- Comparison of temples of The Church of Jesus Christ of Latter-day Saints
- Dover Amendment
- Temple architecture (LDS Church)
- List of temples of The Church of Jesus Christ of Latter-day Saints
- List of temples of The Church of Jesus Christ of Latter-day Saints by geographic region
- The Church of Jesus Christ of Latter-day Saints in Massachusetts

== Additional reading ==
- "Ground broken for Boston temple", Church News, June 21, 1997
- "Superior court rules on steeple for new temple in Boston", Church News, March 4, 2000
- Stahle, Shaun (July 22, 2000), "Boston temple to become 100th edifice", Church News
- "Construction doesn't deter Boston temple open house", Church News, September 9, 2000
- Stahle, Shaun D. (September 23, 2000), "Boston temple will be ready for dedication — as No. 100", Church News
- Stahle, Shaun D. (October 7, 2000), "'This has been a banner year'", Church News
- "Boston Massachusetts: 'We dedicate it as being complete'", Church News, October 7, 2000
- "Facts and figures; Boston Massachusetts Temple", Church News, October 7, 2000
- "Sacred roots, heritage combine in 100th temple", Church News, October 14, 2000
- Stahle, Shaun D. (January 13, 2001), "Court upholds Boston temple zoning case", Church News
- "United States information: Massachusetts", Church News, February 2, 2010
