= List of temples in the United States (LDS Church) =

In The Church of Jesus Christ of Latter-day Saints (LDS Church), a temple is a building dedicated to be a House of the Lord. Church members consider temples to be the most sacred structures on earth.

The LDS Church has 385 temples in various phases, which includes 222 dedicated temples (216 operating, 6 undergoing renovations), 13 with dedications scheduled, 53 under construction, 7 with groundbreaking ceremonies scheduled, and 90 others announced (not yet under construction). There are temples in most U.S. states, Puerto Rico, and Guam.

== Map ==
Temples in the contiguous United States.

Temples outside the U.S. with districts extending into the U.S. are also displayed on the map (but not included in the table).

Temples destroyed, operated by others, or with plans that were suspended/canceled are not displayed on the map (but are included in the table).

- = Operating
- = Under construction
- = Announced
- = Temporarily Closed

== Contents ==
List of temples by state

- Alabama
- Alaska
- Arizona
- Arkansas
- California
- Colorado
- Connecticut
- Florida
- Georgia
- Hawaii
- Idaho
- Illinois
- Iowa
- Indiana
- Kansas
- Kentucky
- Louisiana
- Maine
- Maryland
- Massachusetts
- Michigan
- Minnesota
- Missouri
- Montana
- Nebraska
- Nevada
- New Jersey
- New Mexico
- New York
- North Carolina
- North Dakota
- Ohio
- Oklahoma
- Oregon
- Pennsylvania
- South Carolina
- South Dakota
- Tennessee
- Texas
- Utah
- Virginia
- Wisconsin
- Washington
- Wyoming

== Table ==
Map	Temple		Location	Dedication/Status	Floor area
List of temples in the United States (LDS Church) is located in Alabama	=== Alabama ===				
List of temples in the United States (LDS Church) is located in Alabama	Birmingham Alabama	edit	Gardendale, Alabama, United States	September 3, 2000	10,700 sq ft 990 m^{2}
List of temples in the United States (LDS Church) is located in Alabama	Huntsville Alabama	edit	southeast corner of Gillespie and Browns Ferry Road, Madison Madison County, Alabama, United States	Under construction	22,681 sq ft 2,107.1 m^{2}
Temples in Alaska	=== Alaska ===				
Temples in Alaska	Anchorage Alaska Temple	edit	Anchorage, Alaska, United States	January 9, 1999	11,937 sq ft 1,109.0 m^{2}
Temples in Alaska	Anchorage Alaska (New)	edit	Anchorage, Alaska, United States	Dedication scheduled for 13 June 2027	30,000 sq ft 2,800 m^{2}
Temples in Alaska	Fairbanks Alaska Temple	edit	Fairbanks, Alaska	Under construction	10,000 sq ft 930 m^{2}
Temples in Arizona ()	=== Arizona ===				
Temples in Arizona ()	Flagstaff Arizona Temple	edit	Flagstaff, Arizona	Site announced	19,000 sq ft 1,800 m^{2}
Temples in Arizona ()	Gila Valley Arizona Temple	edit	Central, Arizona, United States	May 23, 2010	18,561 sq ft 1,724.4 m^{2}
Temples in Arizona ()	Gilbert Arizona Temple	edit	Gilbert, Arizona, U.S.	March 2, 2014	85,326 sq ft 7,927.0 m^{2}
Temples in Arizona ()	Mesa Arizona Temple	edit	Mesa, Arizona, United States	October 23, 1927	113,916 sq ft 10,583.1 m^{2}
Temples in Arizona ()	Phoenix Arizona Temple	edit	Phoenix, Arizona, U.S.	November 16, 2014	64,870 sq ft 6,027 m^{2}
Temples in Arizona ()	Queen Creek Arizona	edit	Queen Creek, Arizona, United States	Site announced	82,000 sq ft 7,600 m^{2}
Temples in Arizona ()	Snowflake Arizona Temple	edit	Snowflake, Arizona, U.S.	March 3, 2002	18,621 sq ft 1,729.9 m^{2}
Temples in Arizona ()	Tucson Arizona Temple	edit	Catalina Foothills, Arizona, U.S.	August 13, 2017	38,216 sq ft 3,550.4 m^{2}
Temples in Arizona ()	Yuma Arizona	edit	Yuma, Arizona, United States	Site announced	18,500 sq ft 1,720 m^{2}
List of temples in the United States (LDS Church) is located in Arkansas	=== Arkansas ===				
List of temples in the United States (LDS Church) is located in Arkansas	Bentonville Arkansas	edit	Bentonville, Arkansas, United States	September 17, 2023	28,472 sq ft 2,645.1 m^{2}
Temples in California Temples in the Los Angeles metropolitan area	=== California ===				
Temples in California Temples in the Los Angeles metropolitan area	Bakersfield California	edit	Bakersfield, California, United States	Site announced	30,000 sq ft 2,800 m^{2}
Temples in California Temples in the Los Angeles metropolitan area	Feather River California Temple	edit	Yuba City, California, United States	October 8, 2023	41,665 sq ft 3,870.8 m^{2}
Temples in California Temples in the Los Angeles metropolitan area	Fresno California Temple	edit	Fresno, California, United States	April 9, 2000	10,700 sq ft 990 m^{2}
Temples in California Temples in the Los Angeles metropolitan area	Los Angeles California Temple	edit	Los Angeles, California, United States	March 11, 1956	190,614 sq ft 17,708.6 m^{2}
Temples in California Temples in the Los Angeles metropolitan area	Modesto California	edit	Modesto, California	Dedication scheduled for 22 November 2026	30,000 sq ft 2,800 m^{2}
Temples in California Temples in the Los Angeles metropolitan area	Newport Beach California Temple	edit	Newport Beach, California, United States	August 28, 2005	17,800 sq ft 1,650 m^{2}
Temples in California Temples in the Los Angeles metropolitan area	Oakland California Temple	edit	Oakland, California, United States	November 17, 1964	80,157 sq ft 7,446.8 m^{2}
Temples in California Temples in the Los Angeles metropolitan area	Redlands California Temple	edit	Redlands, California, United States	September 14, 2003	17,300 sq ft 1,610 m^{2}
Temples in California Temples in the Los Angeles metropolitan area	Sacramento California Temple	edit	Rancho Cordova, California, U.S.	September 3, 2006	19,500 sq ft 1,810 m^{2}
Temples in California Temples in the Los Angeles metropolitan area	San Diego California Temple	edit	San Diego, California, United States	April 25, 1993	58,005 sq ft 5,388.8 m^{2}
Temples in California Temples in the Los Angeles metropolitan area	Sunnyvale California	edit	Sunnyvale, California, United States	Site announced	30,000 sq ft 2,800 m^{2}
Temples in California Temples in the Los Angeles metropolitan area	Yorba Linda California Temple	edit	Yorba Linda, California, United States	June 7, 2026	30,872 sq ft 2,868.1 m^{2}
Temples in Colorado	=== Colorado ===				
Temples in Colorado	Denver Colorado Temple	edit	Centennial, Colorado, United States	October 24, 1986	29,177 sq ft 2,710.6 m^{2}
Temples in Colorado	Fort Collins Colorado Temple	edit	Fort Collins, Colorado, United States	October 16, 2016	42,000 sq ft 3,900 m^{2}
Temples in Colorado	Grand Junction Colorado Temple	edit	Grand Junction, Colorado, United States	October 19, 2025	29,630 sq ft 2,753 m^{2}
Temples in Colorado	Colorado Springs Colorado	edit	Colorado Springs, Colorado	Under construction	45,000 sq ft 4,200 m^{2}
List of temples in the United States (LDS Church) is located in Connecticut	=== Connecticut ===				
List of temples in the United States (LDS Church) is located in Connecticut	Hartford Connecticut Temple	edit	Farmington, Connecticut, United States	November 20, 2016	32,246 sq ft 2,995.8 m^{2}
Temples in Florida	=== Florida ===				
Temples in Florida	Lauderdale Florida	edit	Davie, Florida, U.S.	May 4, 2014	30,500 sq ft 2,830 m^{2}
Temples in Florida	Jacksonville Florida	edit	Jacksonville, Florida	Under construction	29,000 sq ft 2,700 m^{2}
Temples in Florida	Orlando Florida	edit	Windermere, Florida, United States	Closed for renovation	70,000 sq ft 6,500 m^{2}
Temples in Florida	Tallahassee Florida	edit	Tallahassee, Florida, United States	December 8, 2024	29,225 sq ft 2,715.1 m^{2}
Temples in Florida	Tampa Florida	edit	Riverview, Florida	Under construction	29,000 sq ft 2,700 m^{2}
List of temples in the United States (LDS Church) is located in Georgia	=== Georgia ===				
List of temples in the United States (LDS Church) is located in Georgia	Atlanta Georgia	edit	Sandy Springs, Georgia, United States	June 1, 1983	34,500 sq ft 3,210 m^{2}
Temples in Hawaii	=== Hawaii ===				
Temples in Hawaii	Kona Hawaii Temple	edit	Kailua-Kona, Hawaii, United States	Closed for renovation	12,325 sq ft 1,145.0 m^{2}
Temples in Hawaii	Laie Hawaii	edit	Laie, Hawaii, United States	November 27, 1919	42,100 sq ft 3,910 m^{2}
Temples in Hawaii	Kahului Hawaii	edit	Kahului, Hawaii	Site announced	19,000 sq ft 1,800 m^{2}
Temples in Hawaii	Honolulu Hawaii	edit	Honolulu, Hawaii, United States	Announced; 7 April 2024	TBD
List of temples in the United States (LDS Church) is located in Idaho List of temples in the United States (LDS Church) is located in Idaho East List of temples in the United States (LDS Church) is located in Boise	=== Idaho ===				
List of temples in the United States (LDS Church) is located in Idaho List of temples in the United States (LDS Church) is located in Idaho East List of temples in the United States (LDS Church) is located in Boise	Boise Idaho Temple	edit	Boise, Idaho, United States	May 25, 1984	35,868 sq ft 3,332.2 m^{2}
List of temples in the United States (LDS Church) is located in Idaho List of temples in the United States (LDS Church) is located in Idaho East List of temples in the United States (LDS Church) is located in Boise	Burley Idaho Temple	edit	Burley, Idaho, United States	January 11, 2026	45,300 sq ft 4,210 m^{2}
List of temples in the United States (LDS Church) is located in Idaho List of temples in the United States (LDS Church) is located in Idaho East List of temples in the United States (LDS Church) is located in Boise	Caldwell Idaho	edit	Caldwell, Idaho	Site announced	82,000 sq ft 7,600 m^{2}
List of temples in the United States (LDS Church) is located in Idaho List of temples in the United States (LDS Church) is located in Idaho East List of temples in the United States (LDS Church) is located in Boise	Coeur d'Alene Idaho	edit	Coeur d'Alene, Idaho, United States	Under construction	29,630 sq ft 2,753 m^{2}
List of temples in the United States (LDS Church) is located in Idaho List of temples in the United States (LDS Church) is located in Idaho East List of temples in the United States (LDS Church) is located in Boise	Idaho Falls Idaho Temple	edit	Idaho Falls, Idaho, United States	September 23, 1945	116,250 sq ft 10,800 m^{2}
List of temples in the United States (LDS Church) is located in Idaho List of temples in the United States (LDS Church) is located in Idaho East List of temples in the United States (LDS Church) is located in Boise	Meridian Idaho Temple	edit	Meridian, Idaho, U.S.	November 19, 2017	67,331 sq ft 6,255.3 m^{2}
List of temples in the United States (LDS Church) is located in Idaho List of temples in the United States (LDS Church) is located in Idaho East List of temples in the United States (LDS Church) is located in Boise	Montpelier Idaho	edit	Montpelier, Idaho	Dedication scheduled for 18 October 2026	34,730 sq ft 3,227 m^{2}
List of temples in the United States (LDS Church) is located in Idaho List of temples in the United States (LDS Church) is located in Idaho East List of temples in the United States (LDS Church) is located in Boise	Pocatello Idaho Temple	edit	Pocatello, Idaho, United States	November 7, 2021	71,125 sq ft 6,607.7 m^{2}
List of temples in the United States (LDS Church) is located in Idaho List of temples in the United States (LDS Church) is located in Idaho East List of temples in the United States (LDS Church) is located in Boise	Rexburg Idaho Temple	edit	Rexburg, Idaho, U.S.	February 10, 2008	57,504 sq ft 5,342.3 m^{2}
List of temples in the United States (LDS Church) is located in Idaho List of temples in the United States (LDS Church) is located in Idaho East List of temples in the United States (LDS Church) is located in Boise	Teton River Idaho	edit	Rexburg, Idaho, U.S.	Under construction	100,000 sq ft 9,300 m^{2}
List of temples in the United States (LDS Church) is located in Idaho List of temples in the United States (LDS Church) is located in Idaho East List of temples in the United States (LDS Church) is located in Boise	Twin Falls Idaho Temple	edit	Twin Falls, Idaho, U.S.	August 24, 2008	31,245 sq ft 2,902.8 m^{2}
List of temples in the United States (LDS Church) is located in Illinois	=== Illinois ===				
List of temples in the United States (LDS Church) is located in Illinois	Chicago Illinois Temple	edit	Glenview, Illinois, United States	August 9, 1985	37,062 sq ft 3,443.2 m^{2}
List of temples in the United States (LDS Church) is located in Illinois	Nauvoo Temple	edit	Nauvoo, Illinois, United States	Destroyed	54,000 sq ft 5,000 m^{2}
List of temples in the United States (LDS Church) is located in Illinois	Nauvoo Illinois Temple	edit	Nauvoo, Illinois, U.S.	June 27, 2002	54,000 sq ft 5,000 m^{2}
List of temples in the United States (LDS Church) is located in Indiana	=== Indiana ===				
List of temples in the United States (LDS Church) is located in Indiana	Indianapolis Indiana Temple	edit	Carmel, Indiana, U.S.	August 23, 2015	34,000 sq ft 3,200 m^{2}
List of temples in the United States (LDS Church) is located in Iowa	=== Iowa ===				
List of temples in the United States (LDS Church) is located in Iowa	Des Moines Iowa	edit	Johnston, Iowa, U.S.	Site announced	18,850 sq ft 1,751 m^{2}
List of temples in the United States (LDS Church) is located in Kansas	=== Kansas ===				
List of temples in the United States (LDS Church) is located in Kansas	Wichita Kansas	edit	Wichita, Kansas	Dedication scheduled for 1 November 2026	9,950 sq ft 924 m^{2}
List of temples in the United States (LDS Church) is located in Kentucky	=== Kentucky ===				
List of temples in the United States (LDS Church) is located in Kentucky	Louisville Kentucky	edit	Peewee Valley, Kentucky, United States	March 19, 2000	10,700 sq ft 990 m^{2}
List of temples in the United States (LDS Church) is located in Louisiana	=== Louisiana ===				
List of temples in the United States (LDS Church) is located in Louisiana	Baton Rouge Louisiana	edit	Baton Rouge, Louisiana, United States	July 16, 2000	10,890 sq ft 1,012 m^{2}
List of temples in the United States (LDS Church) is located in Maine	=== Maine ===				
List of temples in the United States (LDS Church) is located in Maine	Portland Maine	edit	Portland	Announced; 14 December 2025	TBD
List of temples in the United States (LDS Church) is located in Maryland	=== Maryland ===				
List of temples in the United States (LDS Church) is located in Maryland	Washington D.C. Temple	edit	Kensington, Maryland, United States	November 19, 1974	156,558 sq ft 14,544.7 m^{2}
List of temples in the United States (LDS Church) is located in Massachusetts	=== Massachusetts ===				
List of temples in the United States (LDS Church) is located in Massachusetts	Boston Massachusetts Temple	edit	Belmont, Massachusetts, United States	October 1, 2000	69,600 sq ft 6,470 m^{2}
List of temples in the United States (LDS Church) is located in Michigan	=== Michigan ===				
List of temples in the United States (LDS Church) is located in Michigan	Detroit Michigan Temple	edit	Bloomfield Hills, Michigan, United States	October 23, 1999	10,700 sq ft 990 m^{2}
List of temples in the United States (LDS Church) is located in Michigan	Grand Rapids Michigan	edit	Kentwood, Michigan	Under construction	20,123 sq ft 1,869.5 m^{2}
List of temples in the United States (LDS Church) is located in Minnesota	=== Minnesota ===				
List of temples in the United States (LDS Church) is located in Minnesota	St. Paul Minnesota Temple	edit	Oakdale, Minnesota, United States	January 9, 2000	10,700 sq ft 990 m^{2}
Temples in Missouri: = Operating; = Under construction; = Announced; = Temporarily Closed; = Construction suspended	=== Missouri ===				
Temples in Missouri: = Operating; = Under construction; = Announced; = Temporarily Closed; = Construction suspended	Adam-ondi-Ahman	edit	Adam-ondi-Ahman, Daviess County, Missouri, United States	Efforts halted in 1830s	TBD
Temples in Missouri: = Operating; = Under construction; = Announced; = Temporarily Closed; = Construction suspended	Far West	edit	Far West, Caldwell County, Missouri, United States	Efforts halted in 1830s	TBD
Temples in Missouri: = Operating; = Under construction; = Announced; = Temporarily Closed; = Construction suspended	Independence / New Jerusalem	edit	Independence, Missouri, U.S.	Efforts halted in 1830s	TBD
Temples in Missouri: = Operating; = Under construction; = Announced; = Temporarily Closed; = Construction suspended	Kansas City Missouri Temple	edit	Kansas City, Missouri, United States	May 6, 2012	32,000 sq ft 3,000 m^{2}
Temples in Missouri: = Operating; = Under construction; = Announced; = Temporarily Closed; = Construction suspended	St. Louis Missouri	edit	Town and Country, Missouri, United States	June 1, 1997	58,749 sq ft 5,458.0 m^{2}
Temples in Missouri: = Operating; = Under construction; = Announced; = Temporarily Closed; = Construction suspended	Springfield Missouri	edit	Springfield, Missouri, United States	Under construction	29,000 sq ft 2,700 m^{2}
Temples in Montana	=== Montana ===				
Temples in Montana	Billings Montana Temple	edit	Billings, Montana, United States	November 20, 1999	33,800 sq ft 3,140 m^{2}
Temples in Montana	Helena Montana Temple	edit	Helena, Montana, United States	June 18, 2023	9,794 sq ft 909.9 m^{2}
Temples in Montana	Missoula Montana	edit	Missoula, Montana	Under construction	19,000 sq ft 1,800 m^{2}
List of temples in the United States (LDS Church) is located in Nebraska	=== Nebraska ===				
List of temples in the United States (LDS Church) is located in Nebraska	Winter Quarters Nebraska Temple	edit	Omaha, Nebraska, U.S.	April 22, 2001	16,000 sq ft 1,500 m^{2}
List of temples in the United States (LDS Church) is located in Nevada	=== Nevada ===				
List of temples in the United States (LDS Church) is located in Nevada	Elko Nevada Temple	edit	Elko, Nevada, United States	October 12, 2025	12,901 sq ft 1,198.5 m^{2}
List of temples in the United States (LDS Church) is located in Nevada	Las Vegas Nevada Temple	edit	Sunrise Manor, Nevada, United States	December 16, 1989	80,350 sq ft 7,465 m^{2}
List of temples in the United States (LDS Church) is located in Nevada	Lone Mountain Nevada Temple	edit	Las Vegas, Nevada, United States	Under construction	70,194 sq ft 6,521.2 m^{2}
List of temples in the United States (LDS Church) is located in Nevada	Reno Nevada Temple	edit	Reno, Nevada, United States	April 23, 2000	10,700 sq ft 990 m^{2}
List of temples in the United States (LDS Church) is located in New Jersey	=== New Jersey ===				
List of temples in the United States (LDS Church) is located in New Jersey	Summit New Jersey	edit	Summit, New Jersey, United States	Announced; 6 October 2024	TBD
List of temples in the United States (LDS Church) is located in New Mexico	=== New Mexico ===				
List of temples in the United States (LDS Church) is located in New Mexico	Albuquerque New Mexico Temple	edit	Albuquerque, New Mexico, United States	March 5, 2000	34,245 sq ft 3,181.5 m^{2}
List of temples in the United States (LDS Church) is located in New Mexico	Farmington New Mexico Temple	edit	Farmington, New Mexico, United States	August 17, 2025	29,066 sq ft 2,700.3 m^{2}
Temples in New York	=== New York ===				
Temples in New York	Harrison New York	edit	Harrison, New York, U.S.	Efforts suspended	28,400 sq ft 2,640 m^{2}
Temples in New York	Manhattan New York	edit	New York City, U.S.	Closed for renovation	20,630 sq ft 1,917 m^{2}
Temples in New York	Palmyra New York Temple	edit	Manchester and Palmyra, New York, United States	April 6, 2000	10,900 sq ft 1,010 m^{2}
Temples in North Carolina	=== North Carolina ===				
Temples in North Carolina	Charlotte North Carolina	edit	Weddington, North Carolina, United States	Site announced	37,000 sq ft 3,400 m^{2}
Temples in North Carolina	Raleigh North Carolina	edit	Apex, North Carolina, United States	December 18, 1999	12,864 sq ft 1,195.1 m^{2}
List of temples in the United States (LDS Church) is located in North Dakota	=== North Dakota ===				
List of temples in the United States (LDS Church) is located in North Dakota	Bismarck North Dakota Temple	edit	Bismarck, North Dakota, United States	September 19, 1999	10,700 sq ft 990 m^{2}
List of temples in the United States (LDS Church) is located in Ohio	=== Ohio ===				
List of temples in the United States (LDS Church) is located in Ohio	Cincinnati Ohio	edit	Mason, Ohio, United States	Groundbreaking scheduled for 7 November 2026	29,630 sq ft 2,753 m^{2}
List of temples in the United States (LDS Church) is located in Ohio	Cleveland Ohio	edit	Independence, Ohio, United States	August 16, 2026	9,950 sq ft 924 m^{2}
List of temples in the United States (LDS Church) is located in Ohio	Columbus Ohio Temple	edit	Columbus, Ohio, United States	September 4, 1999	11,745 sq ft 1,091.1 m^{2}
List of temples in the United States (LDS Church) is located in Ohio	Kirtland Temple	edit	Kirtland, Ohio, United States	Historic site	15,000 sq ft 1,400 m^{2}
Temples in and near Oklahoma	=== Oklahoma ===				
Temples in and near Oklahoma	Oklahoma City Oklahoma Temple	edit	Yukon, Oklahoma, U.S.	July 30, 2000	10,890 sq ft 1,012 m^{2}
Temples in and near Oklahoma	Tulsa Oklahoma	edit	Tulsa, Oklahoma	Under construction	29,600 sq ft 2,750 m^{2}
Temples in and near Oregon	=== Oregon ===				
Temples in and near Oregon	Medford Oregon Temple	edit	Central Point, Oregon, United States	April 16, 2000	10,700 sq ft 990 m^{2}
Temples in and near Oregon	Portland Oregon Temple	edit	Lake Oswego, Oregon, United States	August 19, 1989	80,500 sq ft 7,480 m^{2}
Temples in and near Oregon	Willamette Valley Oregon Temple	edit	Springfield, Oregon, U.S.	June 7, 2026	30,635 sq ft 2,846.1 m^{2}
Temples in and near Pennsylvania	=== Pennsylvania ===				
Temples in and near Pennsylvania	Harrisburg Pennsylvania	edit	Harrisburg, Pennsylvania, United States	Site announced	20,000 sq ft 1,900 m^{2}
Temples in and near Pennsylvania	Philadelphia Pennsylvania Temple	edit	Philadelphia, Pennsylvania, U.S.	September 18, 2016	61,466 sq ft 5,710.4 m^{2}
Temples in and near Pennsylvania	Pittsburgh Pennsylvania Temple	edit	Cranberry Township, Pennsylvania, United States	September 15, 2024	32,240 sq ft 2,995 m^{2}
List of temples in the United States (LDS Church) is located in South Carolina	=== South Carolina ===				
List of temples in the United States (LDS Church) is located in South Carolina	Columbia South Carolina	edit	Hopkins, South Carolina, United States	October 16, 1999	10,700 sq ft 990 m^{2}
List of temples in the United States (LDS Church) is located in South Carolina	Greenville South Carolina	edit	Greenville, South Carolina	Site announced	18,850 sq ft 1,751 m^{2}
List of temples in the United States (LDS Church) is located in South Dakota	=== South Dakota ===				
List of temples in the United States (LDS Church) is located in South Dakota	Rapid City South Dakota	edit	Rapid City, South Dakota	Site announced	11,800 sq ft 1,100 m^{2}
Temples in and near Tennessee	=== Tennessee ===				
Temples in and near Tennessee	Knoxville Tennessee	edit	Farragut, Tennessee	Dedication scheduled for 7 March 2027	30,000 sq ft 2,800 m^{2}
Temples in and near Tennessee	Memphis Tennessee	edit	Bartlett, Tennessee, United States	April 23, 2000	10,890 sq ft 1,012 m^{2}
Temples in and near Tennessee	Nashville Tennessee	edit	Franklin, Tennessee, United States	May 21, 2000	10,700 sq ft 990 m^{2}
List of temples in the United States (LDS Church) is located in Texas List of temples in the United States (LDS Church) is located in DFW	=== Texas ===				
List of temples in the United States (LDS Church) is located in Texas List of temples in the United States (LDS Church) is located in DFW	Austin Texas Temple	edit	Cedar Park, Texas	Under construction	30,000 sq ft 2,800 m^{2}
List of temples in the United States (LDS Church) is located in Texas List of temples in the United States (LDS Church) is located in DFW	Dallas Texas Temple	edit	Dallas, Texas, United States	October 19, 1984	44,207 sq ft 4,107.0 m^{2}
List of temples in the United States (LDS Church) is located in Texas List of temples in the United States (LDS Church) is located in DFW	El Paso Texas Temple	edit	El Paso, Texas	Announced; 6 October 2024	TBD
List of temples in the United States (LDS Church) is located in Texas List of temples in the United States (LDS Church) is located in DFW	Fort Worth Texas	edit	Burleson, Texas, United States	Dedication scheduled for 10 January 2027	30,000 sq ft 2,800 m^{2}
List of temples in the United States (LDS Church) is located in Texas List of temples in the United States (LDS Church) is located in DFW	Houston Texas Temple	edit	Spring, Texas, United States	August 26, 2000	33,970 sq ft 3,156 m^{2}
List of temples in the United States (LDS Church) is located in Texas List of temples in the United States (LDS Church) is located in DFW	Fort Bend Texas	edit	Missouri City, Texas, United States	Site announced	46,000 sq ft 4,300 m^{2}
List of temples in the United States (LDS Church) is located in Texas List of temples in the United States (LDS Church) is located in DFW	Lubbock Texas Temple	edit	Lubbock, Texas, U.S.	April 21, 2002	16,498 sq ft 1,532.7 m^{2}
List of temples in the United States (LDS Church) is located in Texas List of temples in the United States (LDS Church) is located in DFW	McAllen Texas Temple	edit	McAllen, Texas, United States	October 8, 2023	27,897 sq ft 2,591.7 m^{2}
List of temples in the United States (LDS Church) is located in Texas List of temples in the United States (LDS Church) is located in DFW	Fairview Texas Temple	edit	Fairview, Texas	Under construction	30,742 sq ft 2,856.0 m^{2}
List of temples in the United States (LDS Church) is located in Texas List of temples in the United States (LDS Church) is located in DFW	San Antonio Texas Temple	edit	San Antonio, Texas, U.S.	May 22, 2005	16,800 sq ft 1,560 m^{2}
Temples in Utah Temples along the Wasatch Front = Operating = Under construction = Announced = Temporarily Closed	=== Utah ===				
Temples in Utah Temples along the Wasatch Front = Operating = Under construction = Announced = Temporarily Closed	Bountiful Utah Temple	edit	Bountiful, Utah, United States	January 8, 1995	104,000 sq ft 9,700 m^{2}
Temples in Utah Temples along the Wasatch Front = Operating = Under construction = Announced = Temporarily Closed	Brigham City Utah Temple	edit	Brigham City, Utah, United States	September 23, 2012	36,000 sq ft 3,300 m^{2}
Temples in Utah Temples along the Wasatch Front = Operating = Under construction = Announced = Temporarily Closed	Cedar City Utah Temple	edit	Cedar City, Utah, United States	December 10, 2017	42,657 sq ft 3,963.0 m^{2}
Temples in Utah Temples along the Wasatch Front = Operating = Under construction = Announced = Temporarily Closed	Deseret Peak Utah Temple	edit	Tooele, Utah, United States	November 10, 2024	71,998 sq ft 6,688.8 m^{2}
Temples in Utah Temples along the Wasatch Front = Operating = Under construction = Announced = Temporarily Closed	Draper Utah Temple	edit	Draper, Utah, U.S.	March 20, 2009	58,300 sq ft 5,420 m^{2}
Temples in Utah Temples along the Wasatch Front = Operating = Under construction = Announced = Temporarily Closed	Ephraim Utah	edit	Ephraim, Utah, United States	Dedication scheduled for 11 October 2026	41,680 sq ft 3,872 m^{2}
Temples in Utah Temples along the Wasatch Front = Operating = Under construction = Announced = Temporarily Closed	Heber Valley Utah	edit	Heber City, Utah, United States	Under construction	88,000 sq ft 8,200 m^{2}
Temples in Utah Temples along the Wasatch Front = Operating = Under construction = Announced = Temporarily Closed	Jordan River Utah Temple	edit	South Jordan, Utah, United States	November 16, 1981	148,236 sq ft 13,771.6 m^{2}
Temples in Utah Temples along the Wasatch Front = Operating = Under construction = Announced = Temporarily Closed	Layton Utah Temple	edit	Layton, Utah, United States	June 16, 2024	93,539 sq ft 8,690.1 m^{2}
Temples in Utah Temples along the Wasatch Front = Operating = Under construction = Announced = Temporarily Closed	Lehi Utah	edit	Lehi, Utah, United States	Site announced	85,000 sq ft 7,900 m^{2}
Temples in Utah Temples along the Wasatch Front = Operating = Under construction = Announced = Temporarily Closed	Lindon Utah Temple	edit	Lindon, Utah, United States	May 3, 2026	83,140 sq ft 7,724 m^{2}
Temples in Utah Temples along the Wasatch Front = Operating = Under construction = Announced = Temporarily Closed	Logan Utah	edit	Logan, Utah, United States	May 17, 1884	119,619 sq ft 11,113.0 m^{2}
Temples in Utah Temples along the Wasatch Front = Operating = Under construction = Announced = Temporarily Closed	Manti Utah	edit	Manti, Utah, United States	May 21, 1888	74,792 sq ft 6,948.4 m^{2}
Temples in Utah Temples along the Wasatch Front = Operating = Under construction = Announced = Temporarily Closed	Monticello Utah Temple	edit	Monticello, Utah, United States	July 26, 1998	11,225 sq ft 1,042.8 m^{2}
Temples in Utah Temples along the Wasatch Front = Operating = Under construction = Announced = Temporarily Closed	Mount Timpanogos Utah Temple	edit	American Fork, Utah, United States	October 13, 1996	107,240 sq ft 9,963 m^{2}
Temples in Utah Temples along the Wasatch Front = Operating = Under construction = Announced = Temporarily Closed	Ogden Utah Temple	edit	Ogden, Utah, United States	January 18, 1972	112,232 sq ft 10,426.7 m^{2}
Temples in Utah Temples along the Wasatch Front = Operating = Under construction = Announced = Temporarily Closed	Oquirrh Mountain Utah Temple	edit	South Jordan, Utah, United States	August 21, 2009	60,000 sq ft 5,600 m^{2}
Temples in Utah Temples along the Wasatch Front = Operating = Under construction = Announced = Temporarily Closed	Orem Utah Temple	edit	Orem, Utah, United States	January 21, 2024	71,998 sq ft 6,688.8 m^{2}
Temples in Utah Temples along the Wasatch Front = Operating = Under construction = Announced = Temporarily Closed	Payson Utah Temple	edit	Payson, Utah, U.S.	June 7, 2015	96,630 sq ft 8,977 m^{2}
Temples in Utah Temples along the Wasatch Front = Operating = Under construction = Announced = Temporarily Closed	Price Utah Temple	edit	Price, Utah, United States	Announced; 6 October 2024	TBD
Temples in Utah Temples along the Wasatch Front = Operating = Under construction = Announced = Temporarily Closed	Provo Utah Temple	edit	Provo, Utah, United States	Closed for renovation	128,325 sq ft 11,921.8 m^{2}
Temples in Utah Temples along the Wasatch Front = Operating = Under construction = Announced = Temporarily Closed	Provo City Center Temple	edit	Provo, Utah, U.S.	March 20, 2016	85,084 sq ft 7,904.6 m^{2}
Temples in Utah Temples along the Wasatch Front = Operating = Under construction = Announced = Temporarily Closed	Red Cliffs Utah Temple	edit	St. George, Utah, United States	March 24, 2024	96,277 sq ft 8,944.4 m^{2}
Temples in Utah Temples along the Wasatch Front = Operating = Under construction = Announced = Temporarily Closed	Spanish Fork Utah Temple	edit	Spanish Fork	Site announced	80,000 sq ft 7,400 m^{2}
Temples in Utah Temples along the Wasatch Front = Operating = Under construction = Announced = Temporarily Closed	St. George Utah	edit	St. George, Utah, United States	April 6, 1877	143,969 sq ft 13,375.2 m^{2}
Temples in Utah Temples along the Wasatch Front = Operating = Under construction = Announced = Temporarily Closed	Salt Lake	edit	Salt Lake City, Utah, United States	Closed for renovation	382,207 sq ft 35,508.2 m^{2}
Temples in Utah Temples along the Wasatch Front = Operating = Under construction = Announced = Temporarily Closed	Saratoga Springs Utah Temple	edit	Saratoga Springs, Utah, United States	August 13, 2023	97,836 sq ft 9,089.3 m^{2}
Temples in Utah Temples along the Wasatch Front = Operating = Under construction = Announced = Temporarily Closed	Smithfield Utah	edit	Smithfield, Utah, United States	Dedication scheduled for 18 April 2027	83,000 sq ft 7,700 m^{2}
Temples in Utah Temples along the Wasatch Front = Operating = Under construction = Announced = Temporarily Closed	Syracuse Utah Temple	edit	Syracuse, Utah, United States	June 8, 2025	90,526 sq ft 8,410.1 m^{2}
Temples in Utah Temples along the Wasatch Front = Operating = Under construction = Announced = Temporarily Closed	Taylorsville Utah Temple	edit	Taylorsville, Utah, United States	June 2, 2024	73,492 sq ft 6,827.6 m^{2}
Temples in Utah Temples along the Wasatch Front = Operating = Under construction = Announced = Temporarily Closed	Vernal Utah Temple	edit	Vernal, Utah, United States	November 2, 1997	38,771 sq ft 3,601.9 m^{2}
Temples in Utah Temples along the Wasatch Front = Operating = Under construction = Announced = Temporarily Closed	West Jordan Utah	edit	West Jordan, Utah, United States	Site announced	85,000 sq ft 7,900 m^{2}
Temples in Virginia	=== Virginia ===				
Temples in Virginia	Norfolk Virginia	edit	Norfolk, Virginia	Site announced	18,650 sq ft 1,733 m^{2}
Temples in Virginia	Richmond Virginia Temple	edit	Glen Allen, Virginia, United States	May 7, 2023	39,202 sq ft 3,642.0 m^{2}
Temples in Virginia	Roanoke Virginia	edit	Roanoke, Virginia	Announced; 1 October 2023	TBD
Temples in Virginia	Winchester Virginia	edit	Winchester, Virginia, United States	Under construction	30,000 sq ft 2,800 m^{2}
Temples in and near Washington	=== Washington ===				
Temples in and near Washington	Columbia River Washington Temple	edit	Richland, Washington, United States	November 18, 2001	16,880 sq ft 1,568 m^{2}
Temples in and near Washington	Marysville Washington Temple	edit	Marysville, Washington	Announced; 19 April 2026	TBD
Temples in and near Washington	Moses Lake Washington Temple	edit	Moses Lake, Washington, United States	September 17, 2023	28,933 sq ft 2,688.0 m^{2}
Temples in and near Washington	Seattle Washington Temple	edit	Bellevue, Washington, United States	November 17, 1980	110,000 sq ft 10,000 m^{2}
Temples in and near Washington	Spokane Washington Temple	edit	Spokane Valley, Washington, United States	August 21, 1999	10,700 sq ft 990 m^{2}
Temples in and near Washington	Tacoma Washington	edit	Federal Way, Washington	Site announced	45,000 sq ft 4,200 m^{2}
Temples in and near Washington	Vancouver Washington Temple	edit	Camas, Washington, United States	Under construction	43,000 sq ft 4,000 m^{2}
List of temples in the United States (LDS Church) is located in Wisconsin	=== Wisconsin ===				
List of temples in the United States (LDS Church) is located in Wisconsin	Milwaukee Wisconsin	edit	Milwaukee, Wisconsin, United States	Announced; 6 October 2024	TBD
Temples in Wyoming	=== Wyoming ===				
Temples in Wyoming	Casper Wyoming Temple	edit	Casper, Wyoming, U.S.	November 24, 2024	9,950 sq ft 924 m^{2}
Temples in Wyoming	Cody Wyoming	edit	Cody, Wyoming, United States	Dedication scheduled for 25 October 2026	9,950 sq ft 924 m^{2}
Temples in Wyoming	Star Valley Wyoming Temple	edit	Afton, Wyoming, United States	October 30, 2016	18,609 sq ft 1,728.8 m^{2}
List of temples in the United States (LDS Church) is located in Earth	=== US Territories ===				
List of temples in the United States (LDS Church) is located in Earth	San Juan Puerto Rico Temple	edit	San Juan, Puerto Rico	January 15, 2023	6,988 sq ft 649.2 m^{2}
List of temples in the United States (LDS Church) is located in Earth	Yigo Guam Temple	edit	Yigo, Guam	May 22, 2022	6,861 sq ft 637.4 m^{2}

== See also ==
Worldwide Temples
- List of temples by geographic region (LDS Church)
- List of temples (LDS Church)
- Comparison of temples (LDS Church)
- Temple architecture (LDS Church)
