= McAllen Texas Temple =

LDS Church temple in McAllen, Texas, USA

- Interactive map of McAllen Texas Temple
- Number: 183
- Dedication: 8 October 2023, by Dieter F. Uchtdorf
- Site: 10.61 acres (4.29 ha)
- Floor area: 27,897 ft^{2} (2,591.7 m^{2})
- Height: 108 ft (33 m)
- Official website • News & images

Church chronology
← Moses Lake Washington Temple	McAllen Texas Temple	→ Feather River California Temple

Additional information
- Announced: 5 October 2019, by Russell M. Nelson
- Groundbreaking: 21 November 2020, by Art Rascon
- Open house: 25 August-9 September 2023
- Current president: Carlos Villarreal
- Location: McAllen, Texas, United States
- Coordinates: 26°16′03″N 98°12′41″W
- Baptistries: 1
- Ordinance rooms: 2
- Sealing rooms: 2
- Visitors' center: No

The McAllen Texas Temple is a temple of the Church of Jesus Christ of Latter-day Saints in McAllen, Texas. The intent to construct the temple was announced on October 5, 2019 by church president Russell M. Nelson during general conference, concurrently with 7 others.

The temple was dedicated on October 8, 2023, by Dieter F. Uchtdorf of the Quorum of the Twelve Apostles. The temple serves church members in southern Texas and northern Mexico. It is the fifth in Texas, joining the temples in Dallas, Houston, Lubbock, and San Antonio. It is the church's southernmost temple in the contiguous United States. As of 2019, the Latter-day Saint community in Texas had grown significantly since 1990, from over 154,000 members to more than 350,000, with nearly 700 wards and branches across the state.

== History ==
The presence of the church in South Texas dates back to the 1920s, when Dan Smith and his family were baptized, becoming some of the first members in the region. Although they did not speak Spanish, the Smith family traveled across the U.S.-Mexico border to attend services in Matamoros, Mexico. By the 1940s, the Latter-day Saint population in the area was about 20 members, and in the 1950s, the Rio Grande Valley Branch was established. Over subsequent decades, church membership reached approximately 378,000 members across 78 stakes and 744 congregations by the 2020s.

The temple was announced during general conference, on October 5, 2019, along with 7 other temples. On December 11, 2019, the church announced that the temple would be built on a 10.6-acre site located on the northwest corner of Second Street and West Trenton Road in McAllen. Plans called for a single-story temple of approximately 25,000 square feet, with a center spire, and 107 feet high.

A groundbreaking ceremony, to signify beginning of construction was held on November 21, 2020, with Art Rascon, an area seventy, presiding. Following a public open house from August 25 to September 9, 2023, the temple was dedicated by Dieter F. Uchtdorf on October 8, 2023.

== Design and impact ==
The temple is on a 10.6-acre site on the northwest corner of Second Street and West Trenton Road in McAllen, a city just a few miles from the U.S.-Mexico border. With a center spire, the single-story temple covers a total area of 27,897 square feet, alongside a meetinghouse and a distribution center for temple garments and clothing.

=== Exterior ===
The temple's exterior uses Spanish colonial architecture. Constructed from beige precast concrete panels by Gate Precast in Hillsboro, Texas, the temple has a 107-foot central spire with a design reminiscent of traditional church bell towers. The design includes barbed quatrefoils, shell niches, and scrolls. The structure's blue, gold, and green accents symbolize Texas' bluebonnets, Gulf waters, and landscapes.

Art glass created by Bovard Studio, in collaboration with VCBO Architecture and Holdman Studios, is used in windows throughout the temple. Landscape architect Heffner Design Team of McAllen used local plants and concrete pavers in designing the grounds.

=== Interior ===
The general interior areas have gold broadloom carpeting. Some rooms have area rugs in shades of blues, golds, and greens and the temple's doors are made of mahogany with bronze handles. The main spaces of the temple include two instruction rooms, two sealing rooms, and a baptistry.

Marble for various areas comes from Spain, with scroll shapes similar to Spanish colonial patterns, especially in the baptistry's decorative border. VCBO Architecture and Dale Gierisch of Finessed Finishes Inc. in Springville, Utah, designed and installed decorative paintings throughout the temple, including ceilings, hallways, and the celestial room.

The lighting is a mix of acrylic, bronze, and crystal fixtures, made by Preciosa Lighting and BNA Consulting, while the temple's carved millwork and furniture reflect local motifs like citrus blossoms.

=== Location and impact ===
Located just a few miles from the U.S.-Mexico border, the temple's presence is intended to emphasize unity, togetherness, and faith in a region with a substantial Hispanic population. It creates connection and shared purpose, serving church members unable to travel north due to immigration status or south to Mexico. Its bilingual monument sign contains inscriptions in both English and Spanish.

The temple's architectural and decorative elements include local symbolism of the culture and landscape of the Rio Grande Valley. Citrus blossom motifs are used throughout the exterior and interior.

== Temple leadership and admittance ==
The church's temples are directed by a temple president and matron, each serving for a term of three years. The president and matron oversee the administration of temple operations and provide guidance and training for both temple patrons and staff. As of the dedication in 2023, the first president of the temple is Carlos Villarreal, with Myrna A. Villarreal serving as matron.

=== Admittance ===
Prior to its dedication, a public open house was held. Like all the church's temples, it is not used for Sunday worship services. To members of the church, temples are regarded as sacred houses of the Lord. Once dedicated, only church members with a current temple recommend can enter for worship.

== See also ==
Dallas-Fort Worth Temples

Temples in Texas and Oklahoma

- = Operating
- = Under construction
- = Announced
- = Temporarily Closed

- The Church of Jesus Christ of Latter-day Saints in Texas
- Comparison of temples (LDS Church)
- List of temples (LDS Church)
- List of temples by geographic region (LDS Church)
- Temple architecture (LDS Church)
