= Dallas Texas Temple =

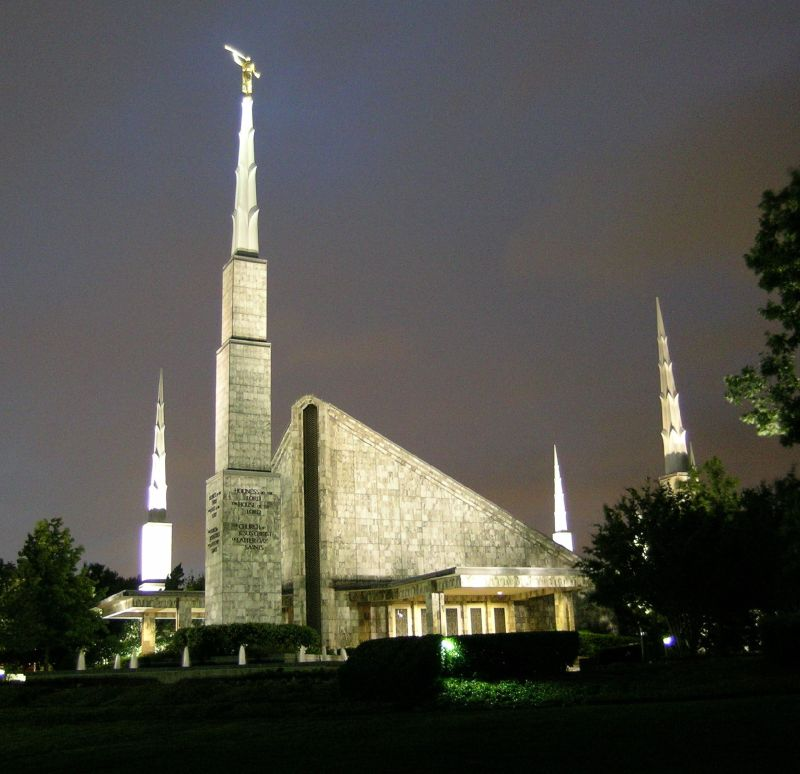
- Interactive map of Dallas Texas Temple
- Number: 30
- Dedication: October 19, 1984, by Gordon B. Hinckley
- Site: 6 acres (2.4 ha)
- Floor area: 44,207 ft^{2} (4,107.0 m^{2})
- Height: 95 ft (29 m)
- Official website • News & images

Church chronology
| ← Manila Philippines Temple | Dallas Texas Temple | → Taipei Taiwan Temple |

Additional information
- Announced: April 1, 1981, by Spencer W. Kimball
- Groundbreaking: January 22, 1983, by Gordon B. Hinckley
- Open house: September 7–26, 1984
- Rededicated: March 5, 1989, by Gordon B. Hinckley
- Current president: Stuart Alleman
- Designed by: Church A&E Services and West & Humphries
- Location: Dallas, Texas, United States
- Coordinates: 32°54′51″N 96°47′48″W
- Exterior finish: Marble tile
- Design: Sloping roof, six spire
- Baptistries: 1
- Ordinance rooms: 5 (stationary)
- Sealing rooms: 4
- Clothing rental: Yes
- Notes: The rededication in 1989 was for the addition only

The Dallas Texas Temple is the 30th operating temple of the Church of Jesus Christ of Latter-day Saints, located in Dallas, Texas. Announced on April 1, 1981, by church president Spencer W. Kimball during a press conference on Temple Square in Salt Lake City, it was one of nine temples announced that day—the largest number ever announced at once at the time. Dedicated on October 19, 1984, by Gordon B. Hinckley, it became the first temple built in Texas and the South Central United States.

The temple is on a 6-acre (24,000 m²) site and has a total floor area of 46,956 square feet (4,362 m²). It has five ordinance rooms and four sealing rooms. When it was dedicated, it served nearly 120,000 Latter-day Saints in most of Texas, all of Oklahoma, and parts of Arkansas, Louisiana, and Missouri. In 2024, it is one of eight temples in Texas, along with those in Austin, Fort Worth, Lubbock, San Antonio, Houston, and McAllen.

== History ==
The Dallas Texas Temple was announced on April 1, 1981, by church president Spencer W. Kimball during a press conference on Temple Square in Salt Lake City. It was part of a historic day, with nine new temples announced—the largest number at one time up to that point.

A groundbreaking ceremony, to signify beginning of construction, took place on January 22, 1983, with Gordon B. Hinckley, then serving as second counselor in the First Presidency, presiding. The invitation-only event was attended by approximately 90 guests, including church leaders serving as regional representatives or stake presidents, and their wives. From October 19 to October 24, 1984, Hinckley dedicated the temple in 23 sessions.

Due to the rapid increase in attendance, remodeling began in 1987 to expand the temple’s capacity. This included relocating and enlarging the baptistry, adding both an ordinance and a sealing room, along with other facilities. This increased its size from 17,850 square feet to 44,207 square feet. Hinckley, then serving as first counselor in the First Presidency, dedicated these new areas on March 5, 1989. In the rededication prayer, he expressed gratitude for the faith and dedication of the Latter-Day Saints that necessitated the expansion.

A renovation of the grounds was completed in June 2006. A sign was relocated outside the adjusted fence-line. The entry plaza was enlarged, stairs were added to improve accessibility, and the water feature was replaced with a cascading fountain. Flower beds were expanded and replanted, and additional lighting and seating areas were installed along widened walkways.

In 1986, ordinance work was performed for individuals involved in the Battle of the Alamo on March 6, 1836. Additionally, temple work was completed for 1,500 Choctaw Indians who perished during the Trail of Tears.

In 2020, like all the church's other, the Dallas Texas Temple was closed for a time in response to the COVID-19 pandemic.

== Design and architecture ==
The Dallas Texas Temple is on a 6-acre (24,000 m²) site in a wooded residential area of northern Dallas. Originally built at 17,850 square feet (1,700 m²) at its dedication in 1984, the temple underwent significant expansions prior to being rededicated in 1989, increasing its total floor area to 44,207 square feet (4,107 m²). Surrounding landscaping includes trees, grass fields, and flower gardens, contributing to a peaceful and reverent atmosphere.

The temple has a light-colored hand-polished marble facade and has a dark gray slate roof. The building has six detached spires, a design similar to earlier temples in Boise, Idaho, and Manila, Philippines. The tallest of these spires is 95 feet (29.0 meters) and has a statue of the angel Moroni.

The temple's interior has five ordinance rooms, four sealing rooms, and a baptistry, each used for religious ordinances and ceremonies performed by church members.

According to the church, "[t]he temple’s architectural features, including its spires and sloping roof, are designed to draw the eye heavenward, reflecting its divine purpose. The carefully maintained grounds, with their trimmed hedges and colorful flowerbeds, add to the temple's quiet environment."

== Temple presidents ==
The church's temples are directed by a temple president and matron, each serving for a term of three years. The president and matron oversee the administration of temple operations and provide guidance and training for both temple patrons and staff.

Serving from 1984 to 1987, the first president of the Dallas Texas Temple was Ivan L. Hobson, with Ruth R. Hobson as matron. L. Lionel Kendrick, an emeritus general authority, was the president from 1993 to 1995. As of 2025, Robert R. Bluth is the president, with Becky J. Bluth serving as matron.

== Admittance ==
After construction was completed, a public open house was held from September 7 to September 24, 1984. During the 20-day open house, approximately 88,430 visitors toured the temple, with about 56% of them being non-Latter-day Saints. The busiest day of the open house was Saturday, September 22, when 12,093 visitors attended, some waiting in line for up to two hours to enter.

Like all the church's temples, it is not used for Sunday worship services. To members of the church, temples are regarded as sacred houses of the Lord. Once dedicated, only church members with a current temple recommend can enter for worship.

== See also ==
Dallas-Fort Worth Temples

Temples in Texas and Oklahoma

- = Operating
- = Under construction
- = Announced
- = Temporarily Closed

- Comparison of temples of The Church of Jesus Christ of Latter-day Saints
- List of temples of The Church of Jesus Christ of Latter-day Saints
- List of temples of The Church of Jesus Christ of Latter-day Saints by geographic region
- Temple architecture (Latter-day Saints)
- The Church of Jesus Christ of Latter-day Saints in Texas
- "Dallas Texas Temple", by Hobson, p. 191
