= San Antonio Texas Temple =

Temple of the Church of Jesus Christ of Latter-day Saints

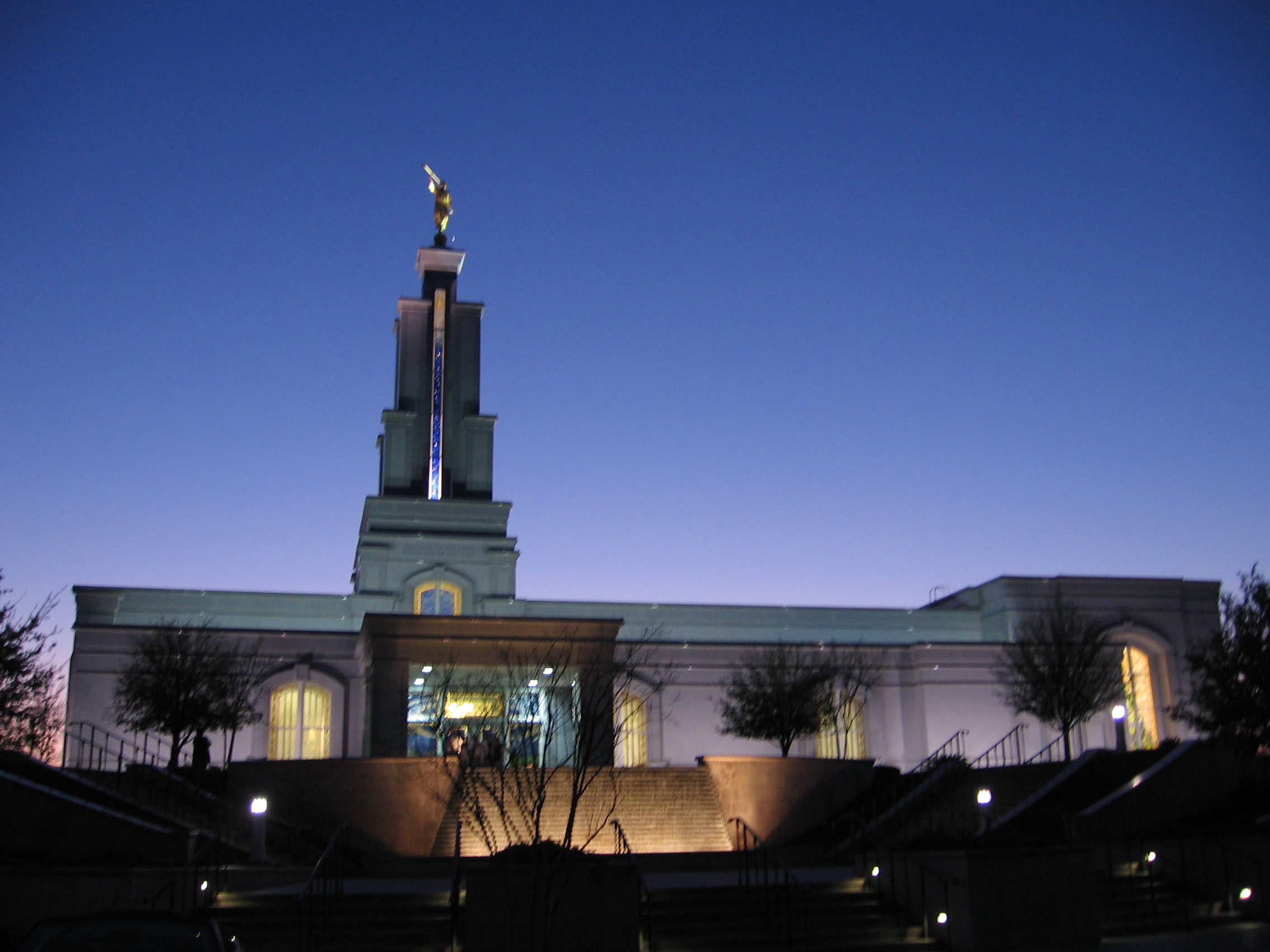
- Interactive map of San Antonio Texas Temple
- Number: 120
- Dedication: May 22, 2005, by Gordon B. Hinckley
- Site: 5.5 acres (2.2 ha)
- Floor area: 16,800 ft^{2} (1,560 m^{2})
- Height: 115 ft (35 m)
- Official website • News & images

Church chronology
← Manhattan New York Temple	San Antonio Texas Temple	→ Aba Nigeria Temple

Additional information
- Announced: June 24, 2001, by Gordon B. Hinckley
- Groundbreaking: March 29, 2003, by H. Bruce Stucki
- Open house: April 16 – May 7, 2005
- Current president: Rodney James Larsen
- Designed by: Rehler, Vaughn & Koone
- Location: San Antonio, Texas, U.S.
- Coordinates: 29°38′29″N 98°29′20″W
- Exterior finish: Granite
- Design: Classic modern, single-spire design
- Baptistries: 1
- Ordinance rooms: 2 (two-stage progressive)
- Sealing rooms: 2

The San Antonio Texas Temple is the 120th operating temple of the Church of Jesus Christ of Latter-day Saints. The intent to build the temple was announced on June 24, 2001, by church president Gordon B. Hinckley, during a devotional in San Antonio. The temple is the fourth in Texas, following the Dallas, Houston, and Lubbock temples.

The temple has a single attached spire with a statue of the angel Moroni. The temple was designed by the firm Rehler, Vaughn & Koone, using a traditional architectural style. A groundbreaking ceremony, to signify the beginning of construction, was held on March 29, 2003, conducted by H. Bruce Stucki, a general authority.

== History ==
On June 24, 2001, the church announced it would build a temple in San Antonio, Texas, making it the state's fourth. Within ten years, the number of church members in the area grew from 9,000 to 12,000. Until the San Antonio Texas Temple was completed, Latter-day Saints in the area travelled 200 miles (320 km) to reach the nearest temple, near Houston.

On March 29, 2003, a site dedication and groundbreaking ceremony was held to signify beginning of construction, and was attended by 450 members. As the temple neared completion in September 2004, a ceremony was held to place a thirteen-foot, gold leafed angel Moroni statue on the temple's spire.

After the building's completion, a public open house was held April 16 through May 7, 2005. During these three weeks, more than 65,000 people toured the newly finished temple.

Church president Gordon B. Hinckley dedicated the temple on May 22, 2005. A celebration was held at the Alamodome the night before the dedication. More than 20,000 people attended to watch the event, which featured over 4,000 singers and dancers, horses, fireworks, and presentations of Texas history, family values, and Latter-day Saint beliefs. Hinckley said his remarks were directly to the youth gathered at the event, as he spoke about the temple. He stated that if the adults wanted to hear from him, they needed to attend the temple's dedication the next day. Other speakers spoke on the temple pointing to the atonement and resurrection of Jesus Christ.

At the time of its completion, the San Antonio Texas Temple served about 45,000 church members in an area spanning from Killeen to Brownsville. It has a total of 16,800 square feet (1,560 m^{2}), with two ordinance rooms, two sealing rooms, and a baptistry (used for baptisms for the dead). Landscaping around the temple includes shrubbery, trees, a water feature and walkways. The temple is on a 5.5-acre site and is 16,800 square feet. A single spire marks the center, and the temple uses art glass for the exterior. The interior features paintings of the life of Jesus Christ, along with other murals in ordinance rooms. The celestial room features a floor to ceiling art glass pieces depicting the tree of life (as found in the Book of Mormon). Gordon B. Hinckley said that "There is no other temple in all of the Church in all of the world that is more beautiful than San Antonio in its interior designs."

In 2020, like all others in the church, the San Antonio Texas Temple was closed for a time in response to the COVID-19 pandemic.

== Design and architecture ==
The building has a traditional Latter-day Saint temple design. Designed by Rehler, Vaughn & Koone, the temple's architecture reflects both the cultural heritage of San Antonio and its spiritual significance to the church.

The temple is on a 5.5-acre plot, and its landscaping has walkways, shrubs, trees, and water features. These elements are designed to invoke “the rugged beauty of South Texas.”

The structure stands 115 feet tall and is constructed with granite. The exterior uses art glass windows designed by Tom Holdman, who has designed many art-glass windows for the church's temples. In addition to glass, its windows use agate, fossilized red coral, and carbuncle.

The temple’s interior “is beautifully furnished with African Cherrywood, stained glass windows, paintings of Christ’s life, and a mural by San Antonio artist Keith Bond. The use of color in the stained glass windows, in a slightly muted southwest style, and the indigo and star motif inside the central spire sets this edifice apart from most other temples.” The temple includes two instruction rooms, two sealing rooms, and a baptistry. The instruction rooms are decorated with murals, and the celestial room has art-glass windows depicting the tree of life.

The design has elements representing Latter-day Saint symbolism to provide deeper spiritual meaning to its appearance and function. Symbolism is important to church members and include the art-glass tree of life in the temple’s celestial room. The tree of life is a common church symbol, and represents eternal life and the love of God.

== Temple presidents ==
The church's temples are directed by a temple president and matron, each serving for a term of three years. The president and matron oversee the administration of temple operations and provide guidance and training for both temple patrons and staff.

Serving from 2005 to 2008, the first president of the San Antonio Texas Temple was Alfred R. Otte, with the matron being Sonya S. Otte. As of 2024, Rodney J. Larsen is the president, with Diane B. Larsen serving as matron.

== Admittance ==
On December 4, 2004, the church announced the public open house that was held from April 16-May 2, 2005 (excluding Sundays). The temple was dedicated by Gordon B. Hinckley on May 22, 2005, in four sessions.

Like all the church's temples, it is not used for Sunday worship services. To members of the church, temples are regarded as sacred houses of the Lord. Once dedicated, only church members with a current temple recommend can enter for worship.

== Gallery ==
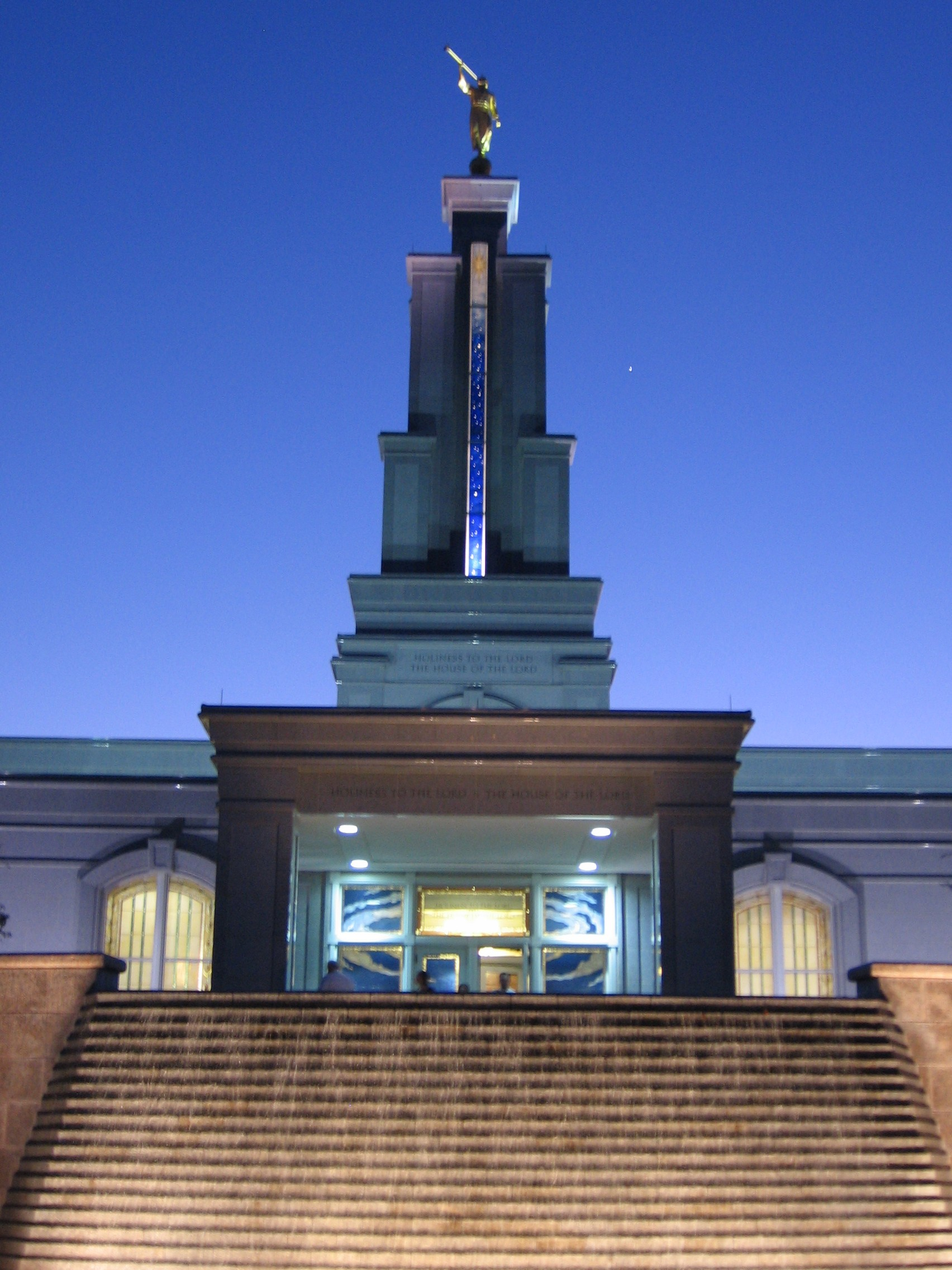
Waterfall steps in front of the Temple.

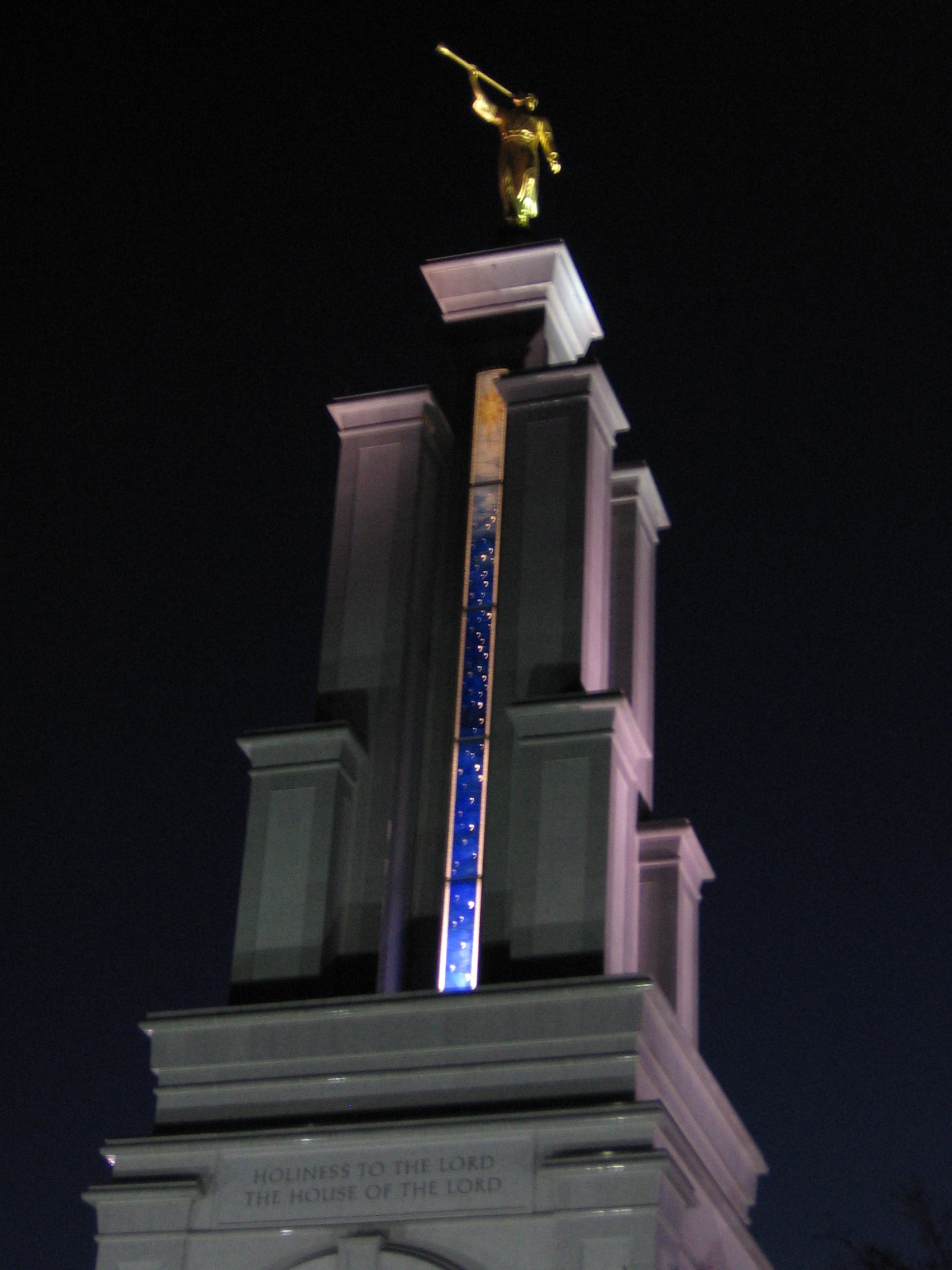
Temple spire with night star motif.

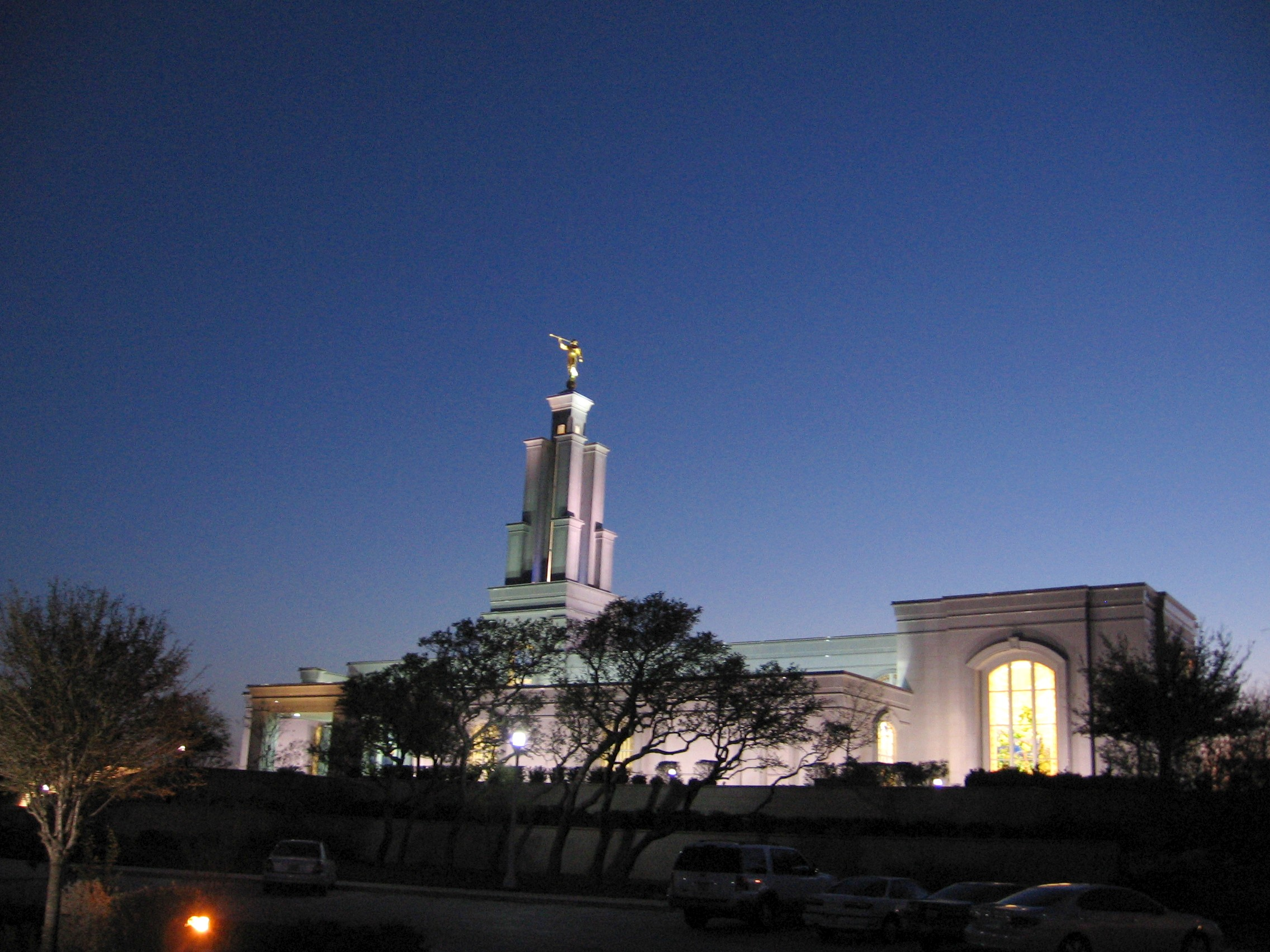
San Antonio Temple at night.

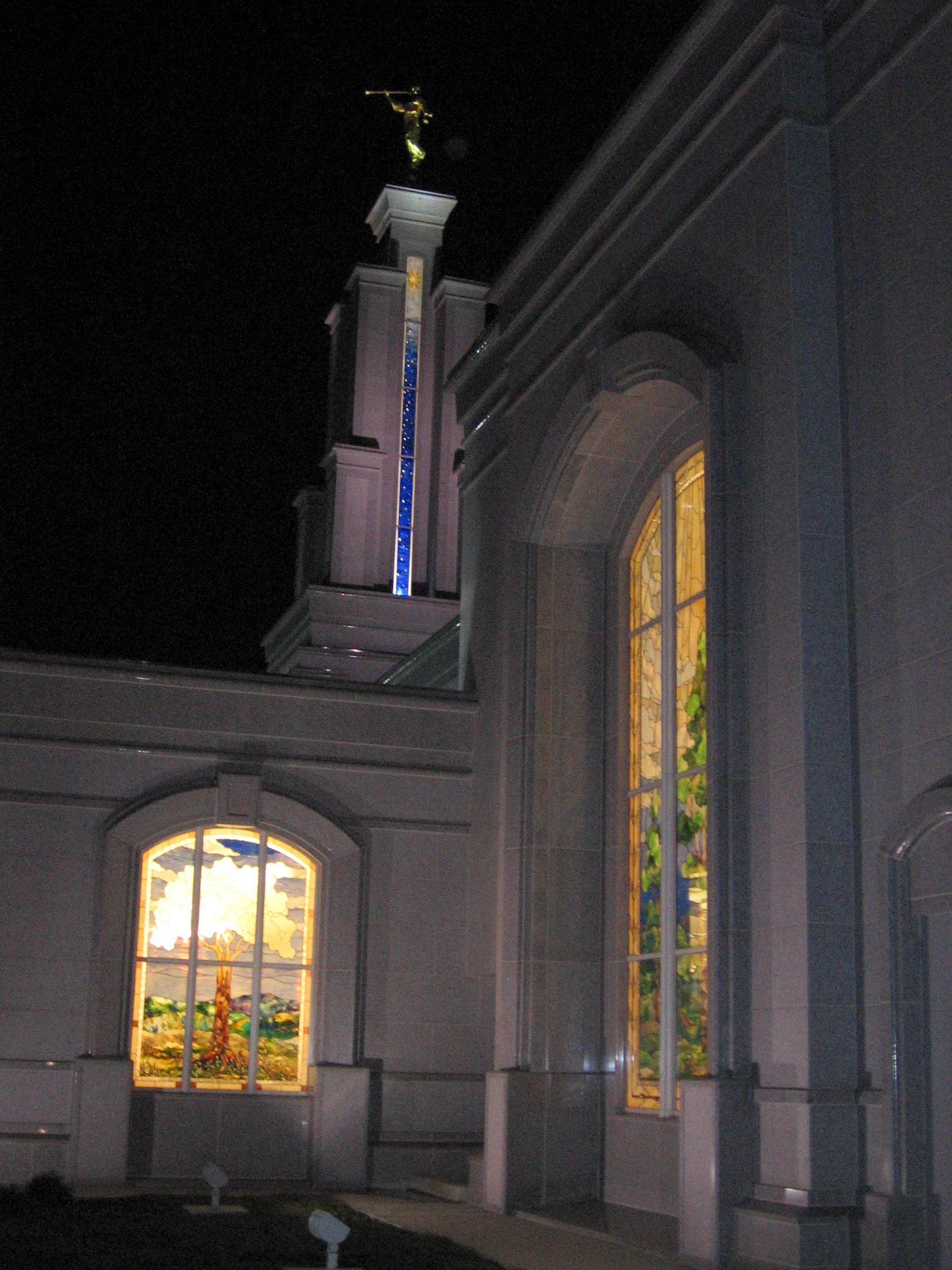
Colored stained glass and spire.

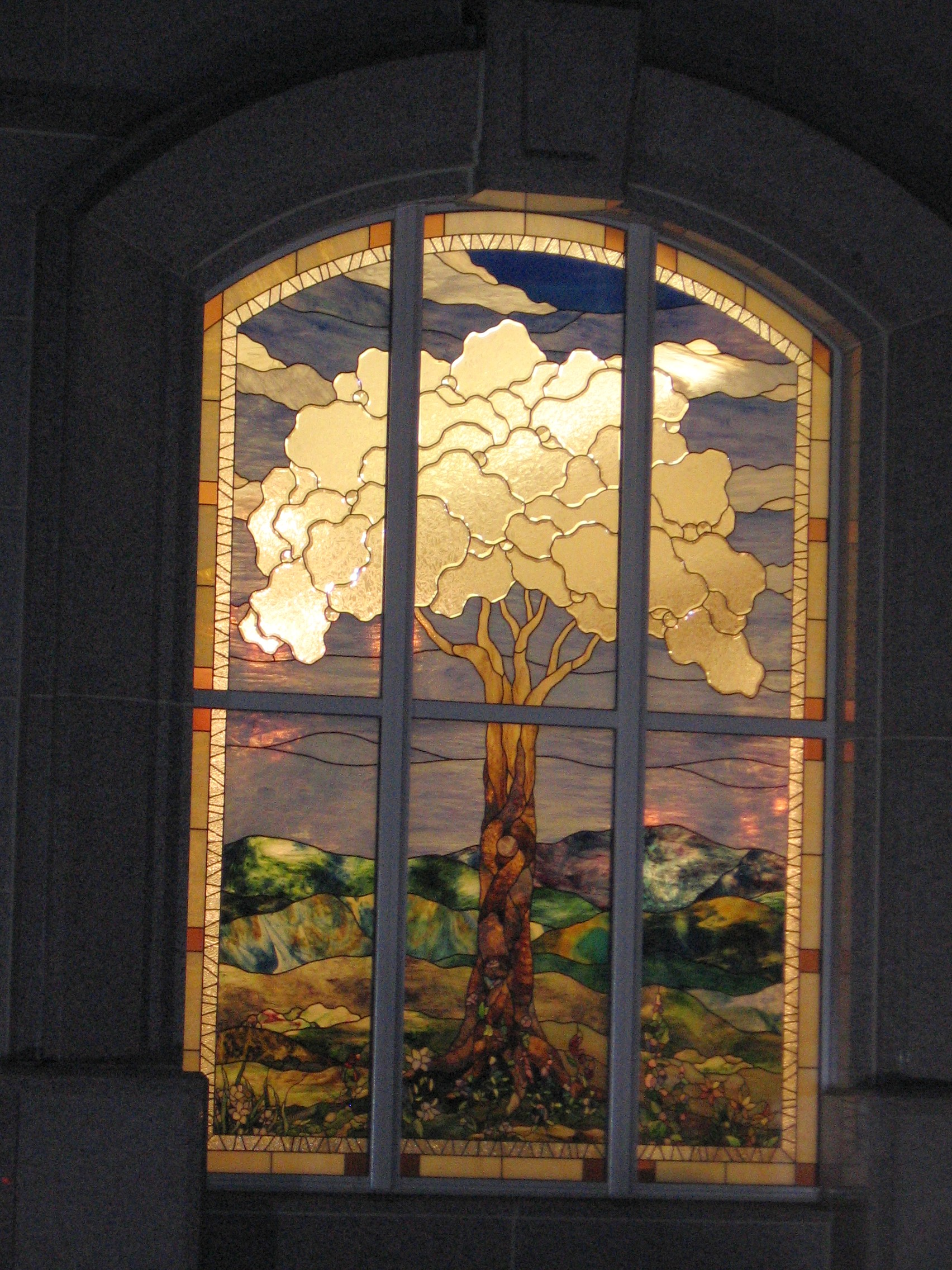
Stained glass northeast facade.

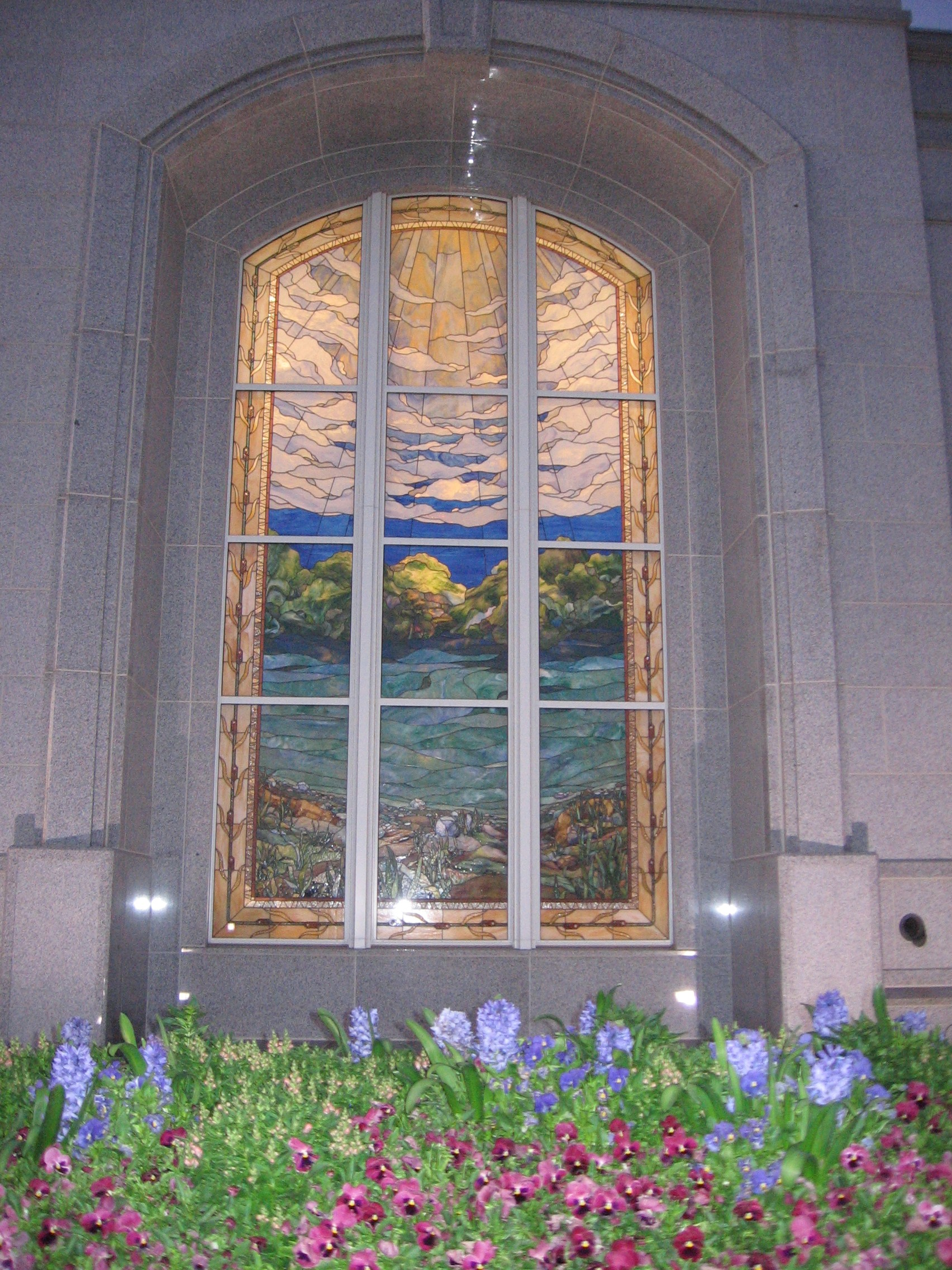
Stained glass, south facade.

== See also ==
Dallas-Fort Worth Temples

Temples in Texas and Oklahoma

- = Operating
- = Under construction
- = Announced
- = Temporarily Closed

- Comparison of temples of The Church of Jesus Christ of Latter-day Saints
- List of temples of The Church of Jesus Christ of Latter-day Saints
- List of temples of The Church of Jesus Christ of Latter-day Saints by geographic region
- Temple architecture (Latter-day Saints)
- The Church of Jesus Christ of Latter-day Saints in Texas
