= Fairview Texas Temple =

Planned temple of the Church of Jesus Christ of Latter-day Saints

- Under construction
- Interactive map of Fairview Texas Temple
- Number: 276
- Site: 8.16 acres (3.30 ha)
- Floor area: 30,742 ft^{2} (2,856.0 m^{2})
- Height: 120 ft (37 m)
- Official website • News & images

Additional information
- Announced: 2 October 2022, by Russell M. Nelson
- Groundbreaking: 21 February 2026, by Jonathan S. Schmitt
- Location: Fairview, Texas
- Coordinates: 33°07′48″N 96°37′40″W
- Baptistries: 1
- Ordinance rooms: 2 (stationary)
- Sealing rooms: 2
- Notes: Revised name and site announced on December 4, 2023.

The Fairview Texas Temple is a planned temple of the Church of Jesus Christ of Latter-day Saints in Fairview, Texas. When completed it will be the tenth in Texas and the third in the Dallas–Fort Worth metroplex. The intent to build the temple was announced on October 2, 2022, by church president Russell M. Nelson during general conference. The temple gained national attention due to a high-profile zoning dispute with the city of Fairview over its height and scale, which led to public protests, legal threats, and ultimately a redesign.

The most recent design plans on the 8.16-acre site anticipate a one-story, 30,000-square-foot structure with a 120-foot spire, using contemporary Latter-day Saint architectural style. Its exterior would include white stone and art-glass windows, with landscaping of trees and flower beds. Once completed, the temple will serve Latter-day Saints in the northern Dallas suburbs.

== History ==
The intent to construct a temple in or near Prosper, Texas was announced by church president Russell M. Nelson on October 2, 2022, during general conference. It was originally announced as the Prosper Texas Temple.

On December 4, 2023, the church announced that the temple would be constructed on an 8.16-acre (3.30 ha) property located at Stacy Road and Meandering Way, adjacent to an existing Latter-day Saint meetinghouse in Fairview, Texas, a northern suburb in the Dallas–Fort Worth metroplex. In the same announcement, the church said it would be renamed the McKinney Texas Temple, and would be multistory and approximately 44,000 square feet.

On February 26, 2024, the church released a rendering of the temple, showing a white building with vertical windows and a golden spire on a rectangular tower above the main entrance.

=== Planning and permitting controversy ===
On May 9, 2024, following a three-hour public hearing attended by dozens of residents, the Fairview Planning and Zoning Commission voted to recommend denial of the church's conditional use permit for the temple. The church had requested an exemption from the local 35-foot height limit for residential zones, which would have allowed nearly double the standard height. Residents also raised concerns about nighttime lighting, increased traffic, and the temple's visual dominance over neighboring homes.

On August 6, 2024, after a four-hour meeting, the city council decided against voting on the permit request, instead urging the church to submit “a proposal more reasonable in size.” Mayor Henry Lessner publicly stated his opposition to the 173-foot steeple, calling the original design “grossly out of proportion” with the town's character, and that he would “never approve that.” In response, church representatives reportedly offered to reduce the height of the spire by 15 feet, though that compromise was not supported, with the mayor stating he wanted the building to reach 42 feet, and the spire to be 68 feet tall (same as the current meetinghouse on the property), which was not accepted either. On August 6, 2024, the Fairview City Council unanimously denied the permit request.

Fearing legal action under the federal Religious Land Use and Institutionalized Persons Act (RLUIPA) and the Texas Religious Freedom Restoration Act, the city established a legal defense fund. On November 18, 2024, the church and the city of Fairview entered into mediation to avoid litigation and reach a mutually acceptable design, The Deseret News reported that the church had reached an agreement in November, but that Mayor Lessner and the town council were looking for additional concessions. Of the November meeting, Lessner said that this was just “the first inning.” The Dallas News stated that two church members, but not the church itself, planned to file a lawsuit against the town (and these two lawsuits were not filed, as of October 16, 2024). A church area seventy, Art Rascon, stated that at the time the church had not taken official action against Fairview, and was still considering all options.

The mediation process resulted in a tentative agreement, but the church later stated that Fairview officials sought additional concessions beyond what had been agreed.

On January 13, 2025, the church released a letter to Fairview from a lawyer, Eric Pinker, in which he expressed that town officials referred to the church in negative ways, characterizing it as a bully, and that the town broke the agreement by seeing it as ongoing, instead of an established compromise. The letter from Pinker reiterated that if the council would not keep its commitment, the church would have no choice but to proceed with litigation for their rights in court, but kept open the future possibility of reconciliation. On January 28, 2025, the church confirmed its intent to sue the town, citing repeated delays and changes to what they had considered a final compromise. In March, a local stake president in Allen sent a letter to the city council, asking them to honor their compromise to make “judicial assistance” unnecessary.

On March 25, 2025, the church submitted a new application for a smaller temple. The new plan called for a one-story building of approximately 30,000 square feet with a maximum spire height of 120 feet, substantially reduced from the original 173 feet. Both parties felt that they had sacrificed much from their original desires, but in mediation, they had come to an agreement due to the other party's sacrifice. The church stated that the revised proposal was based on its understanding that the City Council would support such a plan, as discussed during prior mediation.

On April 28, 2025, the name was changed to the Fairview Texas Temple. The next day, the Fairview city council approved a conditional use permit allowing the church to build the temple with a steeple and spire that will rise to 120 feet above ground.

== Design and architecture ==
The planned temple combines a contemporary architectural style with traditional elements characteristic of Latter-day Saint design. The design was created under the direction of the church's temple department and was released in a rendering on February 26, 2024.

The temple is planned for an 8.16-acre (3.30 ha) plot located on the southeast corner of Stacy Road and Meandering Way in Fairview, near the border with Allen. The site is adjacent to an existing meetinghouse and surrounded by residential neighborhoods, with proximity to commercial developments and major transportation routes. Landscaping around the temple is expected to include flower beds, ornamental shrubs, and 180 trees to create an environment consistent with other church temple grounds.

The temple is expected to be a one-story structure, as revised in March 2025, with a projected area of approximately 30,000 square feet. It is anticipated the building will have a rectangular base with vertical emphasis from its central tower and tall, narrow windows. A gold-colored spire coming up from a square tower over the main entrance is expected, reaching a total height of up to 120 feet, including both the steeple and the structure below. The original two-story proposal featured a much taller spire at 173 feet, but community feedback led to this significant height reduction.

The temple is expected to include soft nighttime illumination, designed to highlight the architectural lines and spire while minimizing light pollution. Lighting concerns were raised during planning hearings, and church representatives stated the temple would comply with Fairview's requirements for directional lighting and brightness limits. The spire lighting is intended to be subtle, contributing to the sacred ambiance without overwhelming the surrounding neighborhood.

In a May 2024 public meeting, church representatives explained that every element of the temple's design has religious significance, and that the structure is meant to be both spiritually inspiring and respectful of the local environment.

== Groundbreaking ==
A private groundbreaking ceremony took place on February 21, 2026. Construction is now in progress.

== See also ==
Dallas-Fort Worth Temples

Temples in Texas and Oklahoma

- = Operating
- = Under construction
- = Announced
- = Temporarily Closed

- Comparison of temples (LDS Church)
- List of temples (LDS Church)
- List of temples by geographic region (LDS Church)
- Temple architecture (LDS Church)
- Architecture of the LDS Church
- The Church of Jesus Christ of Latter-day Saints in Texas
