= Fort Worth Texas Temple =

LDS Church temple in Fort Worth, Texas, U.S.

- Dedication scheduled
- Interactive map of Fort Worth Texas Temple
- Number: 233
- Dedication: 10 January 2027, by TBA
- Site: 9.3 acres (3.8 ha)
- Floor area: 29,630 ft^{2} (2,753 m^{2})
- Official website • News & images

Additional information
- Announced: 3 October 2021, by Russell M. Nelson
- Groundbreaking: 28 October 2023, by Jose L. Alonso
- Open house: 5-21 November 2026
- Current president: Tommy Lawrence Hamilton
- Location: Burleson, Texas, United States
- Coordinates: 32°31′01″N 97°21′28″W
- Baptistries: 1
- Ordinance rooms: 2
- Sealing rooms: 2

The Fort Worth Texas Temple is a temple of the Church of Jesus Christ of Latter-day Saints awaiting dedication in Burleson, Texas, just south of Fort Worth. The intent to construct the temple was announced on October 3, 2021, by church president Russell M. Nelson during general conference. It will be the church's second temple in the greater metropolitan area, following the one in Dallas, and the sixth in Texas.

The temple is a single-story building of approximately 30,000 square feet (2,787 m²), located on a 9.37-acre (3.79 ha) site. Designed by CKG Architecture Inc., the building has arched windows, a multilevel tower with a domed cupola, and five arches surrounding the main entrance. A groundbreaking ceremony was held on October 28, 2023, with Jose L. Alonso, a church general authority, presiding. The temple is scheduled to be dedicated on January 10, 2027.

== History ==
The Fort Worth Texas Temple was one of 13 announced on October 3, 2021, by church president Russell M. Nelson during general conference. At the time, Texas had more than 360,000 Latter-day Saints.

A groundbreaking ceremony was held on October 28, 2023, marking the beginning of construction. The ceremony was presided over by Jose L. Alonso, a General Authority Seventy and first counselor in the church's North America Southwest Area, who offered the dedicatory prayer. Because of rainy weather, the ceremony was held at a local meetinghouse, with church leaders and invited guests then going to the construction site for the symbolic turning of the soil. The ceremony was attended by local religious, government, and community representatives, including Burleson Mayor and Fort Worth City Councilman, along with members of the Burleson City Council. A youth choir performed during the ceremony, and local Latter-day Saint youth also participated.

The temple is the second Latter-day Saint temple in the Dallas–Fort Worth–Arlington metropolitan area, following the Dallas Texas Temple, which was dedicated in 1984. Before construction of the Fort Worth temple, members in the greater Fort Worth area traveled to the Dallas temple to participate in temple ordinances. At the time of the October 2023 groundbreaking, the Dallas Fort Worth area had approximately 83,000 Latter-day Saints, including about 33,000 members in the Fort Worth area.

On August 10, 2026, the church announced that the temple would be dedicated on January 10, 2027, becoming the church's sixth in Texas. A media day was held on November 2, 2026, followed by tours for invited guests on November 3 and 4. A public open house is being held from November 5 through 21, excluding Sundays. The dedication will be in a single session, with the ceremony broadcast to congregations in the temple district.

== Design and architecture ==
The Fort Worth Texas Temple was designed by Chandler Growald of CKG Architecture Inc. It is located at 1851 Greenridge Drive in Burleson, Texas, near the intersection of Southwest Hulen Street and Greenridge Drive, just south of Fort Worth's city limits. The temple is on a 9.37-acre (3.79 ha) property and is a single-story building of approximately 30,000 square feet (2,787 m²). The grounds include grassy areas and flower gardens.

The temple is constructed of white limestone in a Spanish Colonial architectural style. Its exterior features arched window frames and five arches surrounding the main entrance doors. A multilevel tower rises above the building, with a square base, eight arched windows, and a domed cupola topped by a gold dome.

The interior is predominantly white, with cream-colored marble accents, dark wood doorways, and stained-glass windows. Oil paintings primarily depict biblical scenes and events from the life of Jesus Christ, while original works portray local landscapes, including longhorn cattle in a field of wildflowers and a sunset over the nearby Paluxy River.

The baptistry has a font supported by 12 bronze oxen, representing the Twelve Tribes of Israel. The temple also has other ordinance and sealing rooms

== Temple presidents ==
The church's temples are directed by a temple president and matron, each typically serving for a term of three years. The president and matron oversee the administration of temple operations and provide guidance and training for both temple patrons and staff. On May 4, 2026, the church announced that Tommy L. Hamilton and Debbie Hamilton had been called as the temple president and matron.

== Admittance ==
On August 10, 2026, the church announced the temple's public open house which started on November 5 and goes through November 21, 2026, excluding Sundays. A media day was held on November 2, with tours for invited guests on November 3 and 4. The public tours allow visitors to view the temple's interior and grounds and learn about its religious purpose before its dedication.

The temple is scheduled to be dedicated on January 10, 2027, in a single session. The dedication will be broadcast to congregations within the temple district. Like all the church's temples, it is not used for Sunday worship services. To members of the church, temples are regarded as sacred houses of the Lord. Once dedicated, only church members with a current temple recommend can enter for worship.

== See also ==
Dallas-Fort Worth Temples

Temples in Texas and Oklahoma

- = Operating
- = Under construction
- = Announced
- = Temporarily Closed

- Comparison of temples (LDS Church)
- List of temples (LDS Church)
- List of temples by geographic region (LDS Church)
- Temple architecture (LDS Church)
- The Church of Jesus Christ of Latter-day Saints in Texas
