= The Church of Jesus Christ of Latter-day Saints in Texas =

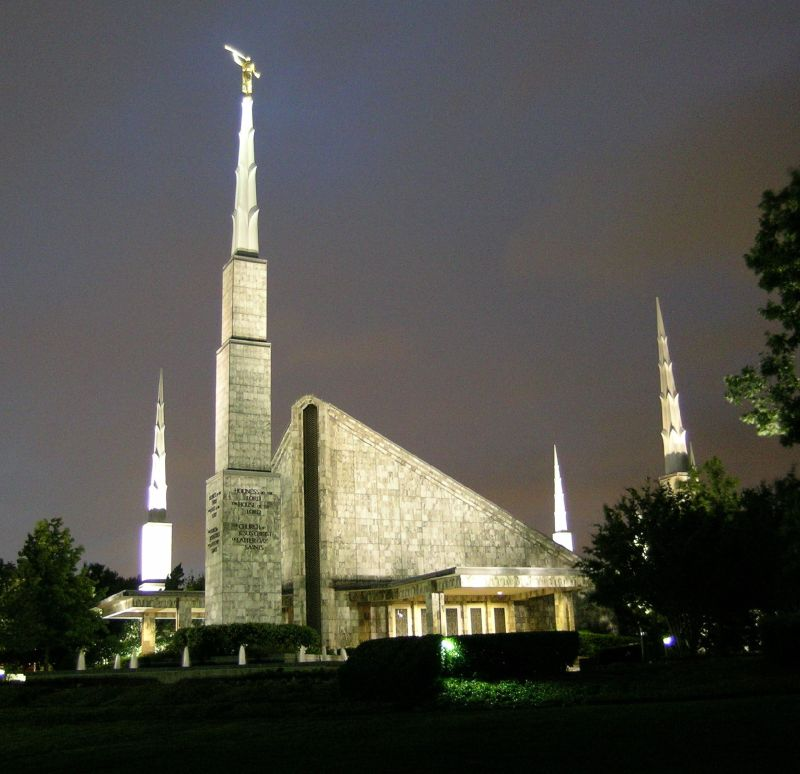
- The Dallas Texas Temple
- Area: US Southwest
- Members: 395,964 (2025)
- Stakes: 83
- Districts: 1
- Wards: 633
- Branches: 123
- Total Congregations: 756
- Missions: 12
- Temples: 5 operating 2 under construction 3 announced 10 total
- FamilySearch Centers: 138

The Church of Jesus Christ of Latter-day Saints in Texas refers to the Church of Jesus Christ of Latter-day Saints (LDS Church) and its members in Texas. Official church membership as a percentage of general population was 1.13% in 2007 and 1.21% in 2014. According to the 2014 Pew Forum on Religion & Public Life survey in both years, roughly 1% of Texans self-identify themselves most closely with the LDS Church.

Texas has the 5th most members of the LDS Church in the United States, and the most members east of the Rocky Mountains. The LDS Church is the 6th largest denomination in Texas.

== History ==
Membership in Texas
Year	Membership
1893	64
1898*	300
1906*	1,000
1930	3,840
1977*	50,000
1984*	120,000
1990*	154,000
1999	210,892
2009	286,902
2019	362,037
2025	395,964
*Membership was published as a rounded number.

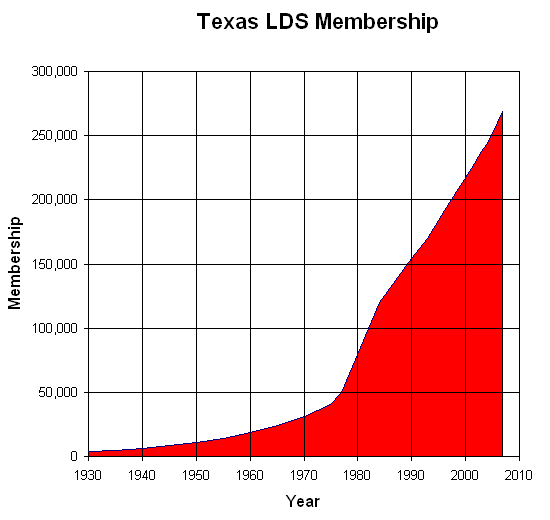
Texas LDS membership history

=== 1844 consideration for Latter Day Saint settlement ===
Increased persecution around Nauvoo in 1844 led Joseph Smith to consider relocating the church outside the borders of the United States. The Republic of Texas, along with other areas in the western United states, were considered by Smith as a place where the church members would be able to peacefully practice their religion. That year, Smith started negotiations with Sam Houston, president of the Republic of Texas, for the southern and western portions of Texas to be the future home of the Latter Day Saints. Smith sent Lucien Woodworth to Austin to meet with Houston.

After Smith's death, negotiations with Houston were abandoned.

=== 2008 Hurricane Ike ===
In response to Hurricane Ike in 2008, members of the LDS Church across Texas and other parts of the country volunteered relief and service.

Total LDS Church response to Hurricane Ike included:

- 80,640 hygiene kits (six truckloads).
- 8.064 cleaning kits (four truckloads).
- 4 truckloads of water.
- 11,520 blankets (two truckloads).
- 4,800 food boxes (four truckloads) which included rice, vegetable oil, peanut butter, fruit drink mix, and assorted canned goods. Each food box could feed a family of four for a week to 10 days.
- Food, water, generators, sleeping bags, tools, chain saws, tarps and other items.

In addition to this aid, thousands of church members came into the area as volunteers to assist in clean up efforts.

== Church units and creation dates ==
=== Stakes and Districts ===
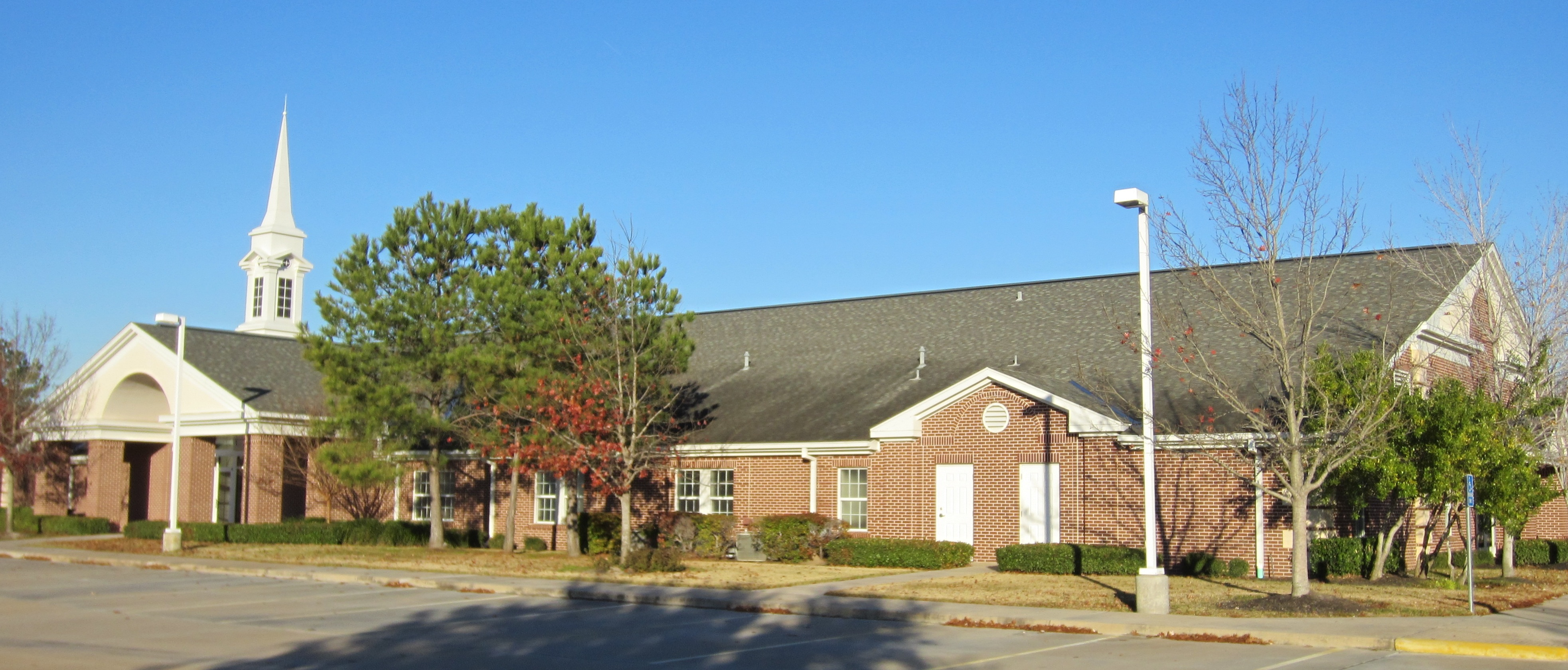
A meetinghouse in Northwest Houston

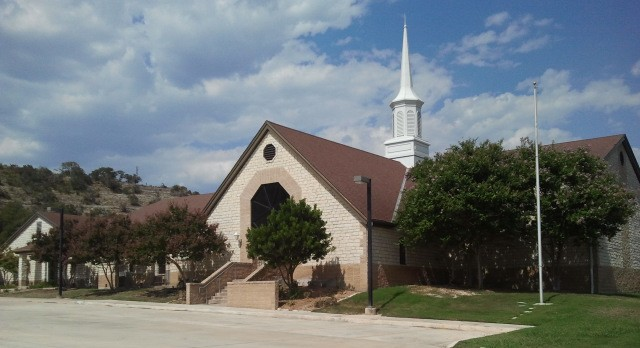
A meetinghouse in Canyon Lake

Stake	Organized	Mission	Temple District
Abilene Texas	3 May 1981	Texas Lubbock	Lubbock Texas
Allen Texas	26 Aug 2007	Texas Dallas East	Dallas Texas
Alliance Texas	16 Feb 2014	Texas Dallas West	Dallas Texas
Amarillo Texas	31 May 1981	Texas Lubbock	Lubbock Texas
Amarillo Texas East	13 Aug 2023	Texas Lubbock	Lubbock Texas
Amistad Texas	8 Jun 2025	Texas San Antonio South	San Antonio Texas
Arlington Texas	13 Apr 1986	Texas Fort Worth	Dallas Texas
Austin Texas	14 Oct 1973	Texas Austin	San Antonio Texas
Austin Texas Oak Hills	1 Dec 1991	Texas Austin	San Antonio Texas
Austin Texas West	15 Sep 2019	Texas Austin	San Antonio Texas
Bay City Texas	13 Oct 1991	Texas Houston South	Houston Texas
Beaumont Texas	3 Sep 1961	Texas Houston East	Houston Texas
Bridgeland Texas (Note: Originally called Houston Texas Bear Creek Stake and renamed to Bridgeland Texas Stake August 22, 2021)	22 Feb 2015	Texas Houston West	Houston Texas
Burleson Texas	11 Sep 2016	Texas Fort Worth	Dallas Texas
Carrollton Texas	9 Dec 2001	Texas Dallas West	Dallas Texas
Cedar Park Texas	5 Jun 2016	Texas Austin	San Antonio Texas
College Station Texas	28 Oct 1979	Texas Houston West	Houston Texas
Colleyville Texas	13 Apr 1997	Texas Dallas West	Dallas Texas
Conroe Texas	30 Apr 2017	Texas Houston North	Houston Texas
Corpus Christi Texas	31 May 1964	Texas San Antonio South	McAllen Texas
Cypress Texas	6 Nov 1983	Texas Houston West	Houston Texas
Dallas Texas	18 Oct 1953	Texas Dallas South	Dallas Texas
Dallas Texas East	15 May 1977	Texas Dallas South	Dallas Texas
Denton Texas	2 May 1992	Texas Dallas North	Dallas Texas
El Paso Texas	21 Sep 1952	Texas El Paso	Ciudad Juárez Mexico
El Paso Texas Mount Franklin	29 Aug 1982	Texas El Paso	Ciudad Juárez Mexico
El Paso Texas Chamizal	17 Jan 2016	Texas El Paso	Ciudad Juárez Mexico
Forney Texas	8 Dec 2024	Texas Dallas South	Dallas Texas
Fort Stockton Texas District	7 Sep 2003	Texas El Paso	Lubbock Texas
Fort Worth Texas	24 Sep 1967	Texas Fort Worth	Dallas Texas
Fort Worth Texas North	6 Nov 2016	Texas Fort Worth	Dallas Texas
Friendswood Texas	29 May 1977	Texas Houston South	Houston Texas
Frisco Texas	4 May 2008	Texas Dallas North	Dallas Texas
Gilmer Texas	16 Jan 1983	Texas Dallas East	Dallas Texas
Harlingen Texas	22 Mar 1981	Texas McAllen	McAllen Texas
Heath Texas	20 May 2012	Texas Dallas East	Dallas Texas
Houston Texas	October 11, 1953	Texas Houston South	Houston Texas
Houston Texas East	May 5, 1968	Texas Houston East	Houston Texas
Houston Texas North	16 Nov 1975	Texas Houston North	Houston Texas
Houston Texas South	30 Nov 1980	Texas Houston South	Houston Texas
Houston Texas Summerwood	3 Jun 2012	Texas Houston East	Houston Texas
Houston Texas West	8 Jan 2006	Texas Houston West	Houston Texas
Hurst Texas	14 Nov 1976	Texas Fort Worth	Dallas Texas
Irving Texas	7 Feb 2016	Texas Dallas West	Dallas Texas
Justin Texas	23 Aug 2026	Texas Dallas West	Dallas Texas
Katy Texas	1 Dec 1991	Texas Houston West	Houston Texas
Killeen Texas	26 Nov 1978	Texas Austin	San Antonio Texas
Kingwood Texas	18 Apr 1982	Texas Houston East	Houston Texas
Klein Texas	2 Nov 2003	Texas Houston North	Houston Texas
Kyle Texas	4 May 2008	Texas Austin	San Antonio Texas
Lawton Oklahoma (Note: Stake located outside Texas with congregation(s) meeting in Texas)	31 Oct 1976	Oklahoma Oklahoma City	Oklahoma City Oklahoma
Laredo Texas (Note: Organized as Laredo Texas Stake December 2, 2018)	31 Oct 1995	Texas San Antonio South	McAllen Texas
League City Texas	25 Oct 2009	Texas Houston South	Houston Texas
Lewisville Texas	12 Apr 1981	Texas Dallas West	Dallas Texas
Little Elm Texas	25 Aug 2019	Texas Dallas North	Dallas Texas
Longview Texas	9 Nov 1969	Texas Dallas South	Dallas Texas
Lubbock Texas	26 Nov 1967	Texas Lubbock	Lubbock Texas
Lubbock Texas North	14 Sep 2014	Texas Lubbock	Lubbock Texas
McAllen Texas	4 May 1975	Texas McAllen	McAllen Texas
McKinney Texas	11 Sep 1994	Texas Dallas North	Dallas Texas
Mission Texas	7 Sep 2008	Texas McAllen	McAllen Texas
Odessa Texas	15 Dec 1968	Texas Lubbock	Lubbock Texas
Orange Texas	29 Aug 1982	Texas Houston East	Houston Texas
Plano Texas	27 May 1973	Texas Dallas East	Dallas Texas
Prosper Texas (Note: Originally Frisco Texas Shawnee Trail, Renamed to Prosper Texas, August 25, 2019)	4 May 2014	Texas Dallas North	Dallas Texas
Richardson Texas	30 Jan 1983	Texas Dallas East	Dallas Texas
Richmond Texas	7 May 2006	Texas Houston South	Houston Texas
Round Rock Texas	6 Jun 1999	Texas Austin	San Antonio Texas
Round Rock Texas East	24 Nov 2013	Texas Austin	San Antonio Texas
Royse City Texas	18 Oct 2026	Texas Dallas East	Dallas Texas
San Antonio Texas	19 Jan 1958	Texas San Antonio South	San Antonio Texas
San Antonio Texas Cibolo Valley	10 Jan 2016	Texas San Antonio North	San Antonio Texas
San Antonio Texas East	30 May 1976	Texas San Antonio North	San Antonio Texas
San Antonio Texas Hill Country	27 Jan 2008	Texas San Antonio North	San Antonio Texas
San Antonio Texas La Cantera	24 Jan 2016	Texas San Antonio North	San Antonio Texas
San Antonio Texas North	19 Oct 1997	Texas San Antonio North	San Antonio Texas
San Antonio Texas Pecan Valley	13 Sep 2020	Texas San Antonio South	San Antonio Texas
San Antonio Texas West	5 Jun 1983	Texas San Antonio North	San Antonio Texas
Sherman Texas	20 Mar 2016	Texas Dallas North	Dallas Texas
Shreveport Louisiana	26 Jan 1958	Mississippi Jackson	Dallas Texas
Spring Texas	8 Nov 2009	Texas Houston North	Houston Texas
Temple Texas	14 Sep 2025	Texas Austin	Dallas Texas
The Woodlands Texas	12 Oct 2014	Texas Houston North	Houston Texas
Tomball Texas	21 May 2017	Texas Houston West	Houston Texas
Tyler Texas	22 Jan 2005	Texas Dallas South	Dallas Texas
Waco Texas	17 Oct 2010	Texas Austin	Dallas Texas
Weatherford Texas	30 Apr 2006	Texas Fort Worth	Dallas Texas
Weslaco Texas	15 Sep 2024	Texas McAllen	McAllen Texas

Two congregations in Southern Texas are not part of a stake or district. These congregations are the Rio Grande City and Roma Branches and are directly administered by the Texas McAllen Mission and part of the McAllen Texas Temple District.

=== Missions ===
Responsibility for Texas has been shared by several different missions. Originally in the Southern States Mission, it was transferred to the Indian Territory Mission, which later changed its name to the Southwestern States Mission and, in 1904, it became the Central States Mission. Texas remained in the Central States Mission until the Texas Mission was organized in 1931. Texas and Louisiana were combined to form the Texas-Louisiana Mission in 1945. Texas was part of the Gulf States Mission from 1955 to 1960.

In 1961, a new Texas Mission was organized. This became the Texas Dallas Mission in 1974. As the church grew, other missions in Texas were organized.

Mission	Organized
Texas Austin Mission	30 June 2020
Texas Dallas East Mission	28 June 2020
Texas Dallas North Mission	1 July 2026
Texas Dallas South Mission	1 July 2024
Texas Dallas West Mission (Note: The Texas Dallas West Mission was originally named the Texas Mission in 1961. It was renamed the Texas North Mission on June 10, 1970, the Texas Dallas Mission on June 20, 1974, and ultimately the Texas Dallas West Mission on July 1, 2020.)	16 February 1961
Texas El Paso Mission	1 July 2024
Texas Fort Worth Mission (Note: The Texas Fort Worth Mission was originally named the Texas Lubbock Mission in 1986. It was renamed the Texas Fort Worth Mission on January 20, 1988.)	1 July 1986
Texas Houston East Mission	1 July 1990
Texas Houston North Mission	1 July 2026
Texas Houston South Mission	1 July 1997
Texas Houston West Mission	1 July 1976
Texas Lubbock Mission	1 July 2002
Texas McAllen Mission (Note: The Texas McAllen Mission was originally named the Texas Corpus Christi Mission in 1989. It was renamed the Texas McAllen Mission on February 24, 1994.)	1 July 1989
Texas San Antonio North Mission (Note: The Texas San Antonio Mission was originally named the Texas South Mission in 1967. It was renamed the Texas San Antonio Mission on June 20, 1974.)	10 December 1967
Texas San Antonio South Mission	1 July 2026

== Temples ==

Temples in Texas and Oklahoma
= Operating
= Under construction
= Announced
= Temporarily Closed

As of August 2026, Texas has 5 temples located in the state, with 3 under construction, and 2 more announced. The far western portion of the state is located in the Ciudad Juárez Mexico Temple District. A few congregations in and around Wichita Falls, TX are in the Lawton Oklahoma Stake and are part of the Oklahoma City Oklahoma Temple District.

30. Dallas Texas Temple; Official website; News & images	
Location: Announced: Groundbreaking: Dedicated: Rededicated: Size: Style: Notes:	Dallas, Texas, United States; April 1, 1981 by Spencer W. Kimball; January 22, 1983 by Gordon B. Hinckley; October 19, 1984 by Gordon B. Hinckley; March 5, 1989 by Gordon B. Hinckley; 44,207 sq ft (4,107.0 m^{2}) on a 6-acre (2.4 ha) site Sloping roof, six spire - designed by Church A&E Services and West & Humphries; The rededication in 1989 was for the addition only
97. Houston Texas Temple; Official website; News & images	
Location: Announced: Groundbreaking: Dedicated: Rededicated: Size: Style: Notes:	Spring, Texas, United States; September 30, 1997 by Gordon B. Hinckley; June 13, 1998 by Lynn A. Mickelsen; August 26, 2000 by Gordon B. Hinckley; April 22, 2018 by M. Russell Ballard; 33,970 sq ft (3,156 m^{2}) on a 11-acre (4.5 ha) site Classic modern, single-spire design - designed by Spencer Partnership Architects and Church A&E Services; Rededicated after repairing damage from Hurricane Harvey
109. Lubbock Texas Temple; Official website; News & images	
Location: Announced: Groundbreaking: Dedicated: Size: Style:	Lubbock, Texas, U.S. April 2, 2000 by Gordon B. Hinckley; November 4, 2000 by Rex D. Pinegar; April 21, 2002 by Gordon B. Hinckley; 16,498 sq ft (1,532.7 m^{2}) on a 2.7-acre (1.1 ha) site Classic modern, single-spire design - designed by Tisdel Minckler and Associates.
120. San Antonio Texas Temple; Official website; News & images	
Location: Announced: Groundbreaking: Dedicated: Size: Style:	San Antonio, Texas, U.S. June 24, 2001 by Gordon B. Hinckley; March 29, 2003 by H. Bruce Stucki; May 22, 2005 by Gordon B. Hinckley; 16,800 sq ft (1,560 m^{2}) on a 5.5-acre (2.2 ha) site Classic modern, single-spire design - designed by Rehler, Vaughn & Koone
183. McAllen Texas Temple; Official website; News & images	
Location: Announced: Groundbreaking: Dedicated: Size:	McAllen, Texas, United States; 5 October 2019 by Russell M. Nelson; 21 November 2020 by Art Rascon; 8 October 2023 by Dieter F. Uchtdorf; 27,897 sq ft (2,591.7 m^{2}) on a 10.61-acre (4.29 ha) site
233. Fort Worth Texas Temple (Dedication scheduled); Official website; News & images	
Location: Announced: Groundbreaking: Open House: Dedicated: Size:	Burleson, Texas, United States; 3 October 2021 by Russell M. Nelson; 28 October 2023 by Jose L. Alonso; 5-21 November 2026 scheduled for 10 January 2027; 30,000 sq ft (2,800 m^{2}) on a 9.37-acre (3.79 ha) site
250. Austin Texas Temple (Under construction); Official website; News & images	
Location: Announced: Groundbreaking: Size:	Cedar Park, Texas; 3 April 2022 by Russell M. Nelson; 17 August 2024 by Michael A. Dunn; 30,000 sq ft (2,800 m^{2}) on a 10.6-acre (4.3 ha) site
276. Fairview Texas Temple (Under construction); Official website; News & images	
Location: Announced: Groundbreaking: Size: Notes:	Fairview, Texas; 2 October 2022 by Russell M. Nelson; 21 February 2026 by Jonathan S. Schmitt; 30,742 sq ft (2,856.0 m^{2}) on a 8.16-acre (3.30 ha) site Revised name and site announced on December 4, 2023.
348. Fort Bend Texas Temple (Site announced); Official website; News & images	
Location: Announced: Size:	Missouri City, Texas, United States; 7 April 2024 by Russell M. Nelson; 46,000 sq ft (4,300 m^{2}) on a 15.7-acre (6.4 ha) site
364. El Paso Texas Temple (Site announced); Official website; News & images	
Location: Announced: Size:	El Paso, Texas; 6 October 2024 by Russell M. Nelson; 22,300 sq ft (2,070 m^{2}) on a 6.4-acre (2.6 ha) site

== Communities ==
Latter-day Saints have had a significant role in establishing and settling communities within the "Mormon Corridor" and other locations, including the following in Texas:

- Enoch
- Kelsey
- Mormon Mill (Texas)
- Zodiac

== See also ==
- The Church of Jesus Christ of Latter-day Saints membership statistics (United States)
- Religion in Texas
