= Feather River California Temple =

Temple of The Church of Jesus Christ of Latter-day Saints in Yuba City, California

- Interactive map of Feather River California Temple
- Number: 184
- Dedication: 8 October 2023, by Ulisses Soares
- Site: 9.24 acres (3.74 ha)
- Floor area: 41,665 ft^{2} (3,870.8 m^{2})
- Height: 135 ft (41 m)
- Official website • News & images

Church chronology
← McAllen Texas Temple	Feather River California Temple	→ Bangkok Thailand Temple

Additional information
- Announced: 7 October 2018, by Russell M. Nelson
- Groundbreaking: 18 July 2020, by Paul H. Watkins
- Open house: 19 August-9 September 2023
- Current president: John Hoybjerg
- Location: Yuba City, California, United States
- Coordinates: 39°08′47″N 121°38′24″W
- Baptistries: 1
- Ordinance rooms: 4
- Sealing rooms: 3
- Visitors' center: No

The Feather River California Temple is a temple of the Church of Jesus Christ of Latter-day Saints in Yuba City, California. The intent to build the temple was announced on October 7, 2018, by church president Russell M. Nelson, during general conference. The temple is the eighth in California. A groundbreaking ceremony, to signify the beginning of construction, was held on July 18, 2020, conducted by Paul H. Watkins, an area seventy.

== History ==
The intent to construct the temple was announced by church president Russell M. Nelson on October 7, 2018, concurrently with 11 other temples. At the time, the number of operating or announced temples was 201.

On July 18, 2020, a groundbreaking to signify beginning of construction was held, with area seventy Paul H. Watkins presiding. Plans called for a two-story, single-spired, 38,000 square foot temple. The temple is built on a nine-acre site that formerly had a church meetinghouse.

Following its completion, a public open house was held from August 19-September 9, 2023, with over 55,000 people attending. On October 8, 2023, the temple was dedicated by Ulisses Soares of the Quorum of the Twelve Apostles.

== Design and architecture ==
The building has a neo-Byzantine architectural style, together with traditional Latter-day Saint temple design. Its architecture considers both the cultural heritage of the Yuba City region and its spiritual significance to the church.

The temple is on a 9.24-acre plot, and the landscaping around the temple features thousands of plants, including oak, redwood, and hackberry trees, as well as 100-year-old olive trees, which were moved to the site from a nearby orchard. A meetinghouse and distribution center are also located on the site.

The temple has a single attached end tower with an octagonal lantern tower and domed cupola, includes a statue of the angel Moroni, and is 135 feet tall. It is constructed with structural steel and precast concrete panels. The exterior art glass features an almond blossom motif. The design uses elements reflecting both local culture and broader church symbolism.

The interior has elements of early Christian architecture, including millwork with a modified quatrefoil pattern. The carpets include patterns from early Christian architecture, as well as floral designs composed of almond blossoms, the California poppy, and local wildflowers. The temple includes four instruction rooms, three sealing rooms, and one baptistry, each arranged for ceremonial use.

The design uses symbolic elements representing the heritage of Yuba City, to provide spiritual meaning to the temple's appearance and function. Symbolism is important to church members and includes the green color of the carpet, representing the area’s farming communities, and the use of the California state flower, the California poppy, in the design of the carpet.

== Temple presidents ==
The church's temples are directed by a temple president and matron, each serving for a term of three years. The president and matron oversee the administration of temple operations and provide guidance and training for both temple patrons and staff. Since its dedication in 2023, the president and matron are John Hoybjerg and Valerie L. Hoybjerg.

== Admittance ==
On March 20, 2023, the church announced that a public open house would be held from August 19-September 9, 2023 (excluding Sundays). The temple was dedicated by Ulisses Soares on October 8, 2023, in two sessions.

Like all the church's temples, it is not used for Sunday worship services. To members of the church, temples are regarded as sacred houses of the Lord. Once dedicated, only church members with a current temple recommend can enter for worship.

== See also ==
Temples in California
Los Angeles Temples
Temples in the Los Angeles metropolitan
area
- = Operating
- = Under construction
- = Announced
- = Temporarily closed

- The Church of Jesus Christ of Latter-day Saints in California
- Comparison of temples of The Church of Jesus Christ of Latter-day Saints
- List of temples of The Church of Jesus Christ of Latter-day Saints
- List of temples of The Church of Jesus Christ of Latter-day Saints by geographic region
- Temple architecture (Latter-day Saints)
