= Oklahoma City Oklahoma Temple =

LDS Church temple in Yukon, Oklahoma, U.S.

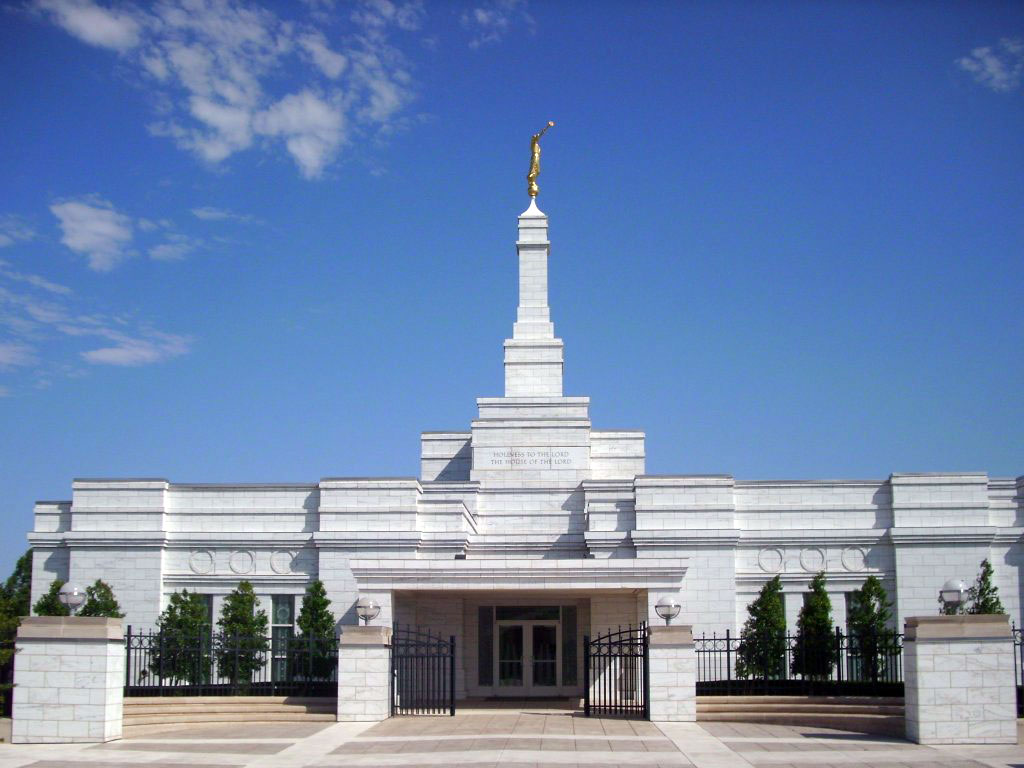
- Interactive map of Oklahoma City Oklahoma Temple
- Number: 95
- Dedication: July 30, 2000, by James E. Faust
- Site: 1 acre (0.40 ha)
- Floor area: 10,890 ft^{2} (1,012 m^{2})
- Height: 71 ft (22 m)
- Official website • News & images

Church chronology
← Baton Rouge Louisiana Temple	Oklahoma City Oklahoma Temple	→ Caracas Venezuela Temple

Additional information
- Announced: March 14, 1999, by Gordon B. Hinckley
- Groundbreaking: July 3, 1999, by Rex D. Pinegar
- Open house: July 8–22, 2000; April 24–May 1, 2019
- Rededicated: May 19, 2019, by Henry B. Eyring
- Current president: Jeffrey Flynn Bellows
- Designed by: Richard Lueb and Church A&E Services
- Location: Yukon, Oklahoma, U.S.
- Coordinates: 35°35′30.64559″N 97°43′36.11999″W
- Exterior finish: White marble quarried in Vermont
- Design: Classic modern, single-spire design
- Baptistries: 1
- Ordinance rooms: 2 (two-stage progressive)
- Sealing rooms: 2
- Clothing rental: Not available

The Oklahoma City Oklahoma Temple is the 95th operating temple of the Church of Jesus Christ of Latter-day Saints (LDS Church) and the first built in the state of Oklahoma. Located in Yukon, a suburb of Oklahoma City, the temple was announced on March 14, 1999, and at the time of its completion served Latter-day Saints across Oklahoma, Arkansas, and Kansas, and Missouri. A Groundbreaking occurred on July 3, 1999, with Rex D. Pinegar, a church general authority, presiding. The temple was dedicated on July 30, 2000, by James E. Faust of the church's First Presidency.

The temple has a single-story design with a four-tiered tower with a gold-colored statue of the angel Moroni on its top. The exterior is composed of light beige limestone, is 10,769 square feet, and has two ordinance rooms, two sealing rooms, and a baptistry. In October 2017, the temple closed for extensive interior and exterior renovations. It was rededicated on May 19, 2019, by Henry B. Eyring of the First Presidency.

== History ==
The Oklahoma City Oklahoma Temple was announced on March 14, 1999, by the church's First Presidency. The temple was constructed on a 1-acre (0.4 ha) property at 12030 North Mustang Road in Yukon, Oklahoma, a suburb of Oklahoma City. The land had been purchased years earlier for the construction of a meetinghouse, along with an additional parcel donated by the sellers. The additional land was originally used as a baseball field by local church members. Preliminary plans called for a single-story structure of more than 10,000 square feet.

The groundbreaking ceremony took place on July 3, 1999, and was presided over by Rex D. Pinegar of the Seventy, then president of the church’s North America Southwest Area, and was attended by local church members and community leaders.

Construction moved forward amid recovery efforts from a devastating tornado that struck the area in May 1999. Pinegar referenced the tornado in his remarks, acknowledging the faith and resilience of the community.

After construction was completed, a public open house was held from July 15 to July 22, 2000, excluding Sunday. Approximately 40,000 visitors toured the temple during the open house.

The temple was dedicated on July 30, 2000, by James E. Faust, second counselor in the First Presidency. It was constructed at a cost of $4.5 million,[23] and contains a total floor area of 10,769 square feet (1,000.5 m²), with two ordinance rooms and two sealing rooms.

On April 10, 2017, the church announced that the temple would close in October 2017 for extensive renovations, with completion anticipated in 2019. On January 16, 2019, the church announced the temple would be rededicated on May 19, 2019. Although it was initially announced that no open house would be held, an update on April 22 confirmed that an open house would occur from April 24 to May 1, excluding Sunday. The temple was rededicated by Henry B. Eyring on May 19, 2019.

In 2020, like all the church's others, the Oklahoma City Oklahoma Temple was closed for a time in response to the COVID-19 pandemic.

== Design and architecture ==
The Oklahoma City Oklahoma Temple is on a 1-acre (0.4 ha) plot at 12030 North Mustang Road in Yukon, Oklahoma, a suburb of Oklahoma City. The landscaping surrounding the temple has lawns and trees, designed to provide a peaceful setting to enhance the sacred atmosphere of the site.

The temple is a single-story structure constructed with light-beige limestone. The exterior has a central spire with a gold-leafed statue of the angel Moroni on its top. The building design is meant to reflect traditional church symbolism while integrating a clean and modest aesthetic that complements the surrounding community. The interior of the temple includes two ordinance rooms and two sealing rooms.

A significant renovation project started in October 2017, as announced by the church on April 10, 2017. The renovations focused on structural upgrades, interior redesign, and technology enhancements. The renovated temple was rededicated on May 19, 2019, by Henry B. Eyring.

=== Temple presidents ===
The church's temples are directed by a temple president and matron, each typically serving for a term of three years. The president and matron oversee the administration of temple operations and provide guidance and training for both temple patrons and staff.

Serving from 2000 to 2005, the first president was Henry J. Chesney, with Peggy J. Chesney serving as matron. As of 2025, Jeffrey F. Bellows is the president, with Marion L. Bellows serving as matron.

=== Admittance ===
Like all the church's temples, it is not used for Sunday worship services. To members of the church, temples are regarded as sacred houses of the Lord. Once dedicated, only church members with a current temple recommend can enter for worship.

== See also ==
Dallas-Fort Worth Temples

Temples in Texas and Oklahoma

- = Operating
- = Under construction
- = Announced
- = Temporarily Closed

- Comparison of temples (LDS Church)
- List of temples (LDS Church)
- List of temples by geographic region (LDS Church)
- Temple architecture (LDS Church)
- The Church of Jesus Christ of Latter-day Saints in Arkansas
- The Church of Jesus Christ of Latter-day Saints in Oklahoma

== Additional reading ==
- "Oklahoma temple dedication in July", Church News, June 3, 2000
- Dockstader, Julie A. (August 5, 2000), "Oklahoma City Temple: A sacred building on sacred ground", Church News
- Dockstader, Julie A. (February 17, 2001), "They're tested in fire; not found wanting", Church News
- "Temple work is a way to say thanks for temple", Church News, December 4, 2004
- "Limited damage for members in wake of Oklahoma tornadoes", Church News, February 11, 2009
