= Lubbock Texas Temple =

Religious building in Texas, United States

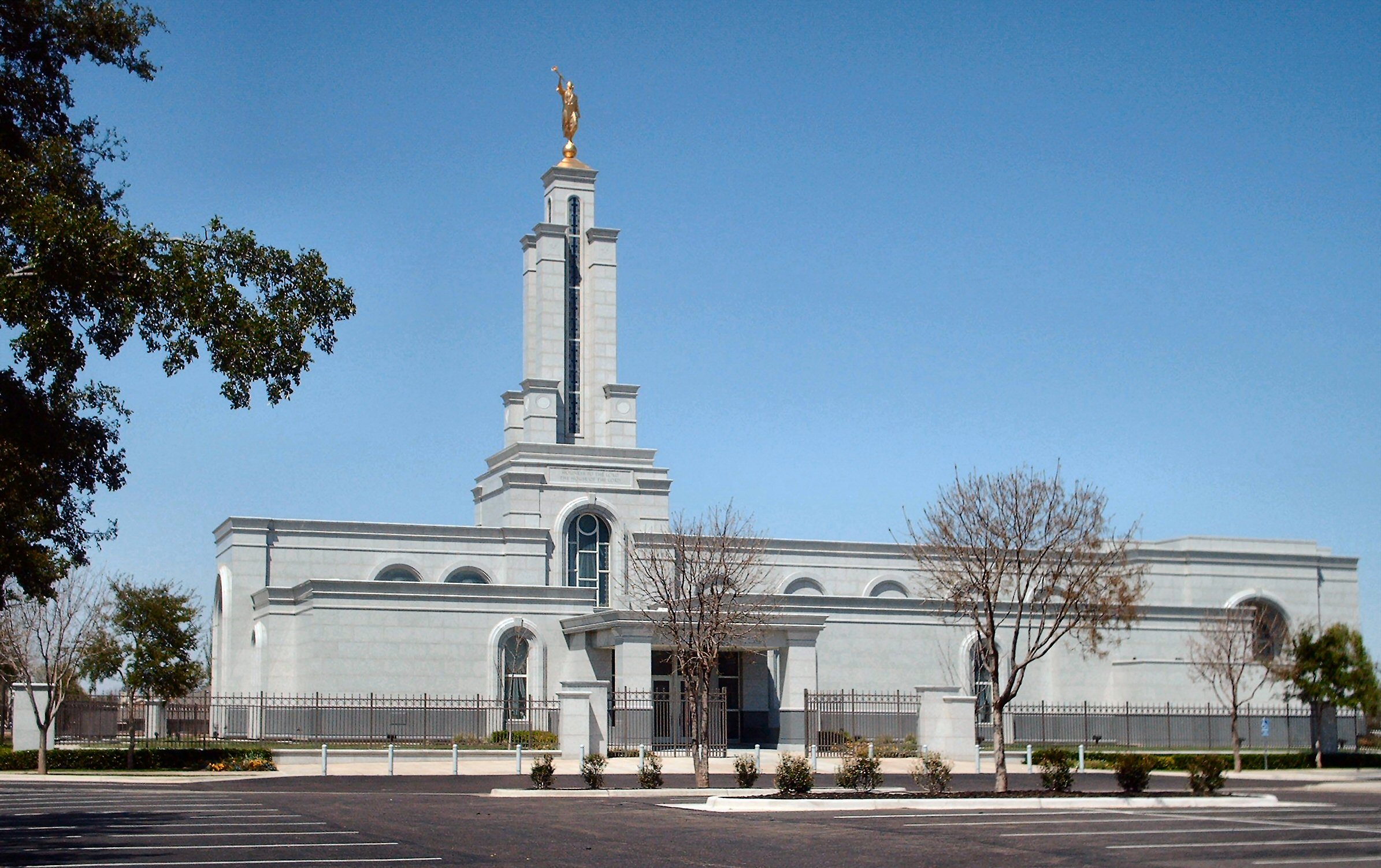
- Interactive map of Lubbock Texas Temple
- Number: 109
- Dedication: April 21, 2002, by Gordon B. Hinckley
- Site: 2.7 acres (1.1 ha)
- Floor area: 16,498 ft^{2} (1,532.7 m^{2})
- Official website • News & images

Church chronology
← Snowflake Arizona Temple	Lubbock Texas Temple	→ Monterrey Mexico Temple

Additional information
- Announced: April 2, 2000, by Gordon B. Hinckley
- Groundbreaking: November 4, 2000, by Rex D. Pinegar
- Open house: March 23–30, 2002
- Current president: Thomas Hill Ashdown
- Designed by: Tisdel Minckler and Associates.
- Location: Lubbock, Texas, U.S.
- Coordinates: 33°31′44″N 101°56′29″W
- Exterior finish: Empress white and majestic gray granite quarried in China
- Design: Classic modern, single-spire design
- Baptistries: 1
- Ordinance rooms: 2 (two-stage progressive)
- Sealing rooms: 2

The Lubbock Texas Temple is the 109th operating temple of the Church of Jesus Christ of Latter-day Saints (LDS Church). The intent to build the temple was announced on April 2, 2000, by church president Gordon B. Hinckley, during general conference. The temple is the third in Texas.

The temple has a single attached central spire with a statue of the angel Moroni. The temple was designed by Tisdale Minckler and Associates, using a traditional architectural style. A groundbreaking ceremony, to signify the beginning of construction, was held on November 4, 2000, conducted by Rex D. Pinegar, a church general authority.

== History ==
The temple was announced by Hinckley on April 2, 2000. Despite a rainstorm, many attended the groundbreaking ceremony held on November 4, 2000. The ceremony was conducted by Rex D. Pinegar, who was president of the church's North America Southwest Area.

During a public open house held from March 23 to 30, 2002, more than 21,500 people toured the building. The Lubbock Texas Temple was dedicated by Hinckley on April 21, 2002.

In 2020, like all the church's others, the Lubbock Texas Temple was closed for a time in response to the COVID-19 pandemic.

== Design and architecture ==
The building has a traditional Latter-day Saint temple design. Designed by Tisdel Minckler and Associates, its architecture reflects both the cultural heritage of Texas and its spiritual significance to the church. The temple is on a 2.7-acre plot, which it shares with a stake center.

The structure was constructed with light colored granite, and has a total floor area of 16,498 square feet. The exterior has the angel Moroni statue on top of the temple’s spire. The temple has two sealing rooms, two ordinance rooms, and a baptistry.

The design uses symbolic elements representing Latter-day Saint symbolism, to provide deeper spiritual meaning its appearance and function. Symbolism is important to church members and includes the angel Moroni statue, which represents “the restoration of the gospel of Jesus Christ.”

== Temple presidents ==
The church's temples are directed by a temple president and matron, each typically serving for a term of three years. The president and matron oversee the administration of temple operations and provide guidance and training for both temple patrons and staff.

Serving from 2002 to 2004, Jay B. Jensen was the first president, with Alice M. Jensen as matron. As of 2024, Thomas H. Ashdown is the president, with Barbara E. Ashdown sering as matron.

== Admittance ==
Following the temple’s completion, the church held a public open house from March 23 to 30, 2002. More than 21,000 people visited the temple during the open house. The temple was dedicated by Gordon B. Hinckley on April 21, 2002, in four sessions.

Like all the church's temples, it is not used for Sunday worship services. To members of the church, temples are regarded as sacred houses of the Lord. Once dedicated, only church members with a current temple recommend can enter for worship.

== See also ==
Dallas-Fort Worth Temples

Temples in Texas and Oklahoma

- = Operating
- = Under construction
- = Announced
- = Temporarily Closed

- Comparison of temples of The Church of Jesus Christ of Latter-day Saints
- List of temples of The Church of Jesus Christ of Latter-day Saints
- List of temples of The Church of Jesus Christ of Latter-day Saints by geographic region
- Temple architecture (Latter-day Saints)
- The Church of Jesus Christ of Latter-day Saints in Texas
