= The Church of Jesus Christ of Latter-day Saints in Oklahoma =

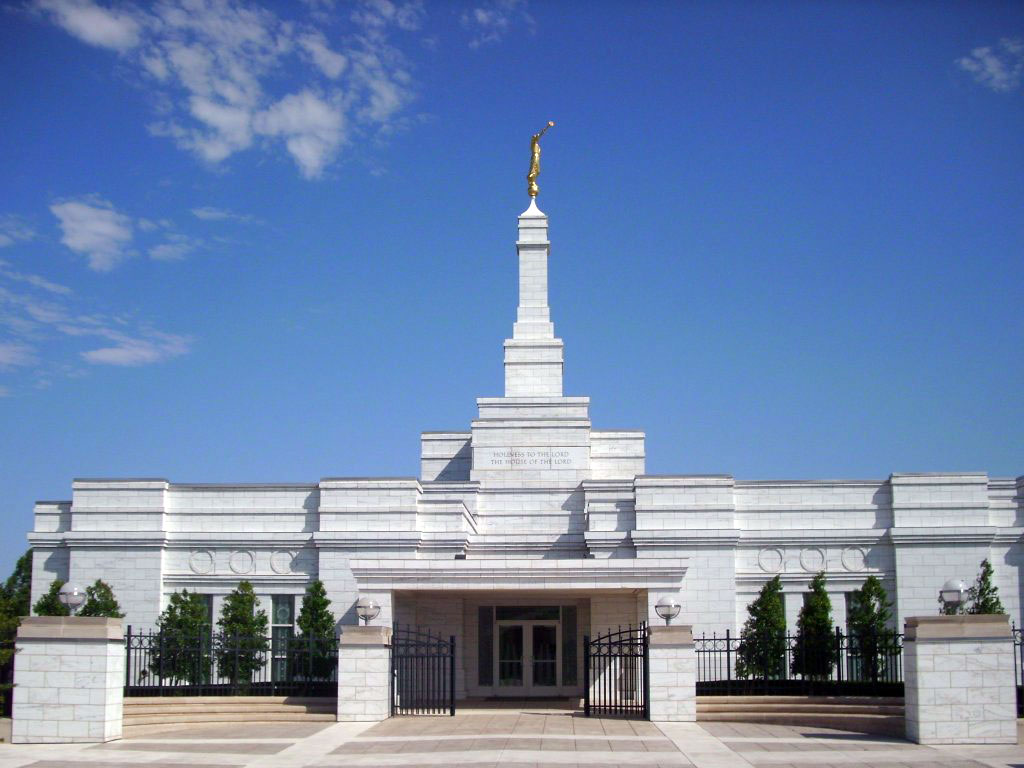
- The Oklahoma City Oklahoma Temple
- Area: US Southwest
- Members: 53,890 (2025)
- Stakes: 13
- Wards: 80
- Branches: 18
- Total Congregations: 98
- Missions: 1
- Temples: 1 operating 1 announced 2 total
- FamilySearch Centers: 30

The Church of Jesus Christ of Latter-day Saints in Oklahoma refers to the Church of Jesus Christ of Latter-day Saints (LDS Church) and its members in Oklahoma. Official church membership as a percentage of general population was 1.20% in 2014. According to the 2014 Pew Forum on Religion & Public Life survey, 1% of Oklahomans self-identify themselves most closely with the LDS Church. The LDS Church is the 8th largest denomination in Oklahoma.

The history of the denomination in what would become Oklahoma begins in the 1840s and the Indian Territory Mission was created and placed under the leadership of George Miller in 1855. The first temple in Oklahoma was dedicated in 2000. The eleven stakes based in Oklahoma are located in Bartlesville, Broken Arrow, Edmond, Gore, Lawton, Norman, Oklahoma City, Owasso, Stillwater and Tulsa.

== History ==
Membership in Oklahoma
Year	Membership
1974	10,105
1980	20,819
1990	26,596
1999	33,721
2009	41,547
2019	49,227
2025	53,890
Source: Windall J. Ashton; Jim M. Wall, Deseret News, various years, Church Almanac State Information: Oklahoma

In the late 1840s, George Miller, a former bishop who delayed going to the West, traveled from Winter Quarters to visit his son in Texas. He and two other members with him, Joseph Kilting and Richard Hewitt, found construction work available in the Cherokee Nation. They arrived in Tahlequah on July 9, 1847, and began to build houses. They also began to teach others about the LDS Church's faith and doctrine, but antagonism forced Miller to leave in December. Hewitt and Kilting remained to work.

In 1855, Orson Spencer and James McGaw visited the Indian Territory from St. Louis, Missouri, and on April 8, five more church missionaries were sent from Salt Lake City, and four from St. Louis. The Indian Territory Mission was created and placed under the leadership of Miller on June 26, 1855.

The missionaries met and reconverted followers of Lyman Wight. One of these was Jacob Croft who had met missionaries earlier and started for Utah. After hearing misconceptions about conditions there, his party settled in Indian Territory and built a gristmill.

As early as July 1855, missionaries preached to about 400 Indians, and the Cherokee Branch was started at Croft's Spavinaw Creek mill. This became mission headquarters. Croft later lead a party of 56 including other former followers of Wight and some re-converted "Strangites" to Utah. Later in the year, missionaries were sent from St. Louis to southern portions of the Cherokee Nations. In 1856, the Princess Creek branch was organized. The Lehi and Nephi branches were organized in 1858. Illness was a problem in the Indian Territory Mission for many years. At least four missionaries died including Orson Spencer.

The Remaining Members Migrated to Utah in 1858 and 1859. By 1860, the missionaries (except John A. Richards, who had married an Indian wife) returned to Utah and the mission was discontinued.

When Matthew Dalton and John Hubbard returned to begin missionary work in 1877, they found Richards was still faithful, and they received assistance from him. Later that year, Hubbard died and the mission was closed. In 1883, Matthew Dalton and George Teasdale of the Quorum of the Twelve reorganized the mission. Tracts in the Cherokee language were printed.

Andrew Kimball, father of future church president Spencer W. Kimball, presided over the mission in 1885. Although he had contracted malaria, he carried on the work and was assisted by John Richards, and later by additional full-time missionaries. In 1892, the first meetinghouse was built in Manard (Cherokee County). Another was built in Massey (Choctaw Nation).

On November 7, 1911, a branch was established at Gore with 113 members but was later dissolved. It was not until May 1, 1960, when the branch was again organized in Gore. A Sunday school that began in Bartlesville in 1924 became a branch on October 13, 1945. Membership increased slowly as many converts moved to Utah. Membership increased in the 1950s and 1960s. Two stakes were created in 1960. The Tulsa Stake was created on May 1, 1960, and the Oklahoma City Stake on October 23, 1960.

The Latter-day Saint community reached out to those in need after the destruction of the Alfred P. Murrah Federal Building in downtown Oklahoma City on April 19, 1995.

In 1999, thousands of Latter-day Saint volunteers from Oklahoma and surrounding areas came to Oklahoma in response to the 1999 Oklahoma tornado outbreak to provide rescue, relief, and recovery for the victims of the storm. Latter-day Saints in Oklahoma provided relief to victims of other disasters including floods in 2007, the Mid-May 2008 tornado outbreak sequence, and provided aid to victims of Hurricane Katrina.

On October 17, 2021, the LDS Church donated $2 million to the First Americans Museum in Oklahoma City. The donation is intended to assist Native Americans in learning about their ancestral past.

== Stakes ==
There are 13 stakes with their stake center located in Oklahoma. All of these thirteen stakes are located in the Oklahoma City Oklahoma Temple district and the Oklahoma Oklahoma City Mission. Five other stakes have congregations in Oklahoma.

As of July 2026, the following stakes had congregations in Oklahoma:

Stake	Organized	Mission	Temple District
Bartlesville Oklahoma	Nov 2, 2014	Oklahoma Tulsa	Oklahoma City Oklahoma
Broken Arrow Oklahoma	Apr 30, 1978	Oklahoma Tulsa	Oklahoma City Oklahoma
Centerton Arkansas (Note: Stake located outside Oklahoma with congregation(s) meeting in Oklahoma)	Sep 14, 2025	Arkansas Bentonville	Bentonville Arkansas
Deer Creek Oklahoma	Mar 30, 2025	Oklahoma Oklahoma City	Oklahoma City Oklahoma
Edmond Oklahoma	Jun 17, 2018	Oklahoma Oklahoma City	Oklahoma City Oklahoma
Garden City Kansas	May 18, 2003	Kansas Wichita	Denver Colorado
Gilmer Texas	Jan 16, 1983	Texas Dallas East	Dallas Texas
Gore Oklahoma	May 7, 2023	Oklahoma Tulsa	Oklahoma City Oklahoma
Joplin Missouri	Aug 28, 1977	Arkansas Bentonville	Bentonville Arkansas
Lawton Oklahoma	Oct 31, 1976	Oklahoma Oklahoma City	Oklahoma City Oklahoma
Noble Oklahoma	Mar 30, 2025	Oklahoma Oklahoma City	Oklahoma City Oklahoma
Norman Oklahoma	Oct 18, 1970	Oklahoma Oklahoma City	Oklahoma City Oklahoma
Oklahoma City	Nov 14, 1982	Oklahoma Oklahoma City	Oklahoma City Oklahoma
Owasso Oklahoma	May 7, 2023	Oklahoma Tulsa	Oklahoma City Oklahoma
Sherman Texas	Mar 20, 2016	Texas Dallas North	Dallas Texas
Stillwater Oklahoma	Jun 14, 1981	Oklahoma Tulsa	Oklahoma City Oklahoma
Tulsa Oklahoma	May 1, 1960	Oklahoma Tulsa	Oklahoma City Oklahoma
Yukon Oklahoma	Oct 23, 1960	Oklahoma Oklahoma City	Oklahoma City Oklahoma

== Missions ==
On March 29, 1898, Oklahoma became part of the Southwestern States Mission, and it was included in the Central States Mission on April 4, 1904. The Oklahoma Mission was created on June 10, 1970, renamed the Oklahoma Tulsa Mission in 1974. The Oklahoma Oklahoma City Mission was created in 1990.

In 2015, at the request of Scott K. Shumway, president of the Oklahoma Tulsa Mission, its headquarters were relocated to Bentonville, Arkansas, which was geographically located in the center of the mission boundaries. In June 2015, business was presented in the units across the mission boundaries sustaining the official name change to the Arkansas Bentonville Mission.

In December 2016, the Tulsa, Tulsa East, and Bartlesville stakes were transferred from the Arkansas Bentonville Mission to the Oklahoma Oklahoma City Mission. With this change, all 8 stakes in the state of Oklahoma were within the same mission boundaries.

Mission	Organized
Oklahoma Oklahoma City Mission	1 July 1990
Oklahoma Tulsa Mission	1 July 2026

== Temples ==
Temples in Oklahoma

= Operating
= Under construction
= Announced
ButtonBlack.svg|10px|link=]] = Temporarily Closed

The Oklahoma City Oklahoma Temple was dedicated on July 30, 2000, by James E. Faust of the First Presidency. The temple was closed for more than two years for an extensive renovation and was rededicated on May 19, 2019, by Henry B. Eyring. An open house was held for the public before the dedication and guests included 20 state legislators.

On October 5, 2019, during the church's general conference, church president Russell M. Nelson announced plans to construct the Bentonville Arkansas Temple, which was dedicated in 2023. This temple district includes congregations in Northeast Oklahoma as part of its district. Then in 2023, Nelson announced a new temple would be built in Tulsa.

95. Oklahoma City Oklahoma Temple; Official website; News & images	
Location: Announced: Groundbreaking: Dedicated: Rededicated: Size: Style:	Yukon, Oklahoma, U.S. March 14, 1999 by Gordon B. Hinckley; July 3, 1999 by Rex D. Pinegar; July 30, 2000 by James E. Faust; May 19, 2019 by Henry B. Eyring; 10,890 sq ft (1,012 m^{2}) on a 1-acre (0.40 ha) site Classic modern, single-spire design - designed by Richard Lueb and Church A&E Services
284. Tulsa Oklahoma Temple (Under construction); Official website; News & images	
Location: Announced: Groundbreaking: Size:	Tulsa, Oklahoma; 1 October 2023 by Russell M. Nelson; 22 August 2026 by Pedro X. Larreal; 29,600 sq ft (2,750 m^{2}) on a 25.7-acre (10.4 ha) site

== See also ==
- The Church of Jesus Christ of Latter-day Saints membership statistics (United States)
- Oklahoma: Religion
