= Protestantism in Colombia =

The National Administrative Department of Statistics (DANE) does not collect religious statistics, and accurate reports are difficult to obtain. However, based on various studies and a survey, about 90% of the population adheres to Christianity, the majority of which (70.9%) are Roman Catholic, while a significant minority (16.7%) adhere to Protestantism (primarily Evangelicalism).

In 2020, figures suggest that Protestants make up 14% of the country's population.

Protestant Christians present in Colombia are Baptists, Lutherans, Mennonites, Nazarenes, Seventh-day Adventists and Pentecostals.

== Denominations ==
- Alianza Cristiana y Misionera
- Assemblies of God
- Asociación de Iglesias Hermanos Menonitas de Colombia: 831 (1998)
- Church of God Ministry of Jesus Christ International
- Church of the Nazarene: 12,860 (1998)
- Hermanos en Cristo
- Iglesia Cruzada Evangélica
- Iglesia de Dios
- Iglesia Evangélica Luterana
- Iglesia Metodista de Colombia
- Misión Evangélica
- Mision Indigena
- Misión Nuevas Tribus
- Presbyterian Church of Colombia
- Unión Misionera Evangélica
- Seventh-day Adventist Church

== Freedom of religion ==
The constitution provides for freedom of religion and the government generally is in support of this. However, international NGOs have stated that indigenous Protestants face threats, harassment and arbitrary detention in their communities due to their religious beliefs; in particular, Indigenous authorities in the Pizarro and Litoral de San Juan municipalities in the Chocó Department have prohibited the practice of Christianity and stated punishments for Protestants.

In 2023, the country was scored 4 out of 4 for religious freedom.

In the same year, the country was rank as the 22nd most difficulty place in the world to be a Christian.

== See also ==
- Religion in Colombia
- Christianity in Colombia
- Pentecostalism in Colombia
- Protestantism by country
- Mennonites in Colombia
