= Christianity in Colombia =

The National Administrative Department of Statistics (DANE) does not collect religious statistics, and accurate reports are difficult to obtain. However, based on various studies and a survey, about 90% of the population adheres to Christianity, the majority of which (70.9%) are Roman Catholic, while a significant minority (16.7%) adhere to Protestantism (primarily Evangelicalism) and other Christian groups.

== Roman Catholic archdioceses and other dioceses (in brackets) ==
1. Barranquilla: (El Banco, Riohacha, Santa Marta, Valledupar)
2. Bogotá: (Engativá, Facatativá, Fontibón, Girardot, Soacha, Zipaquirá)
3. Bucaramanga: (Barrancabermeja, Málaga-Soatá, Socorro y San Gil, Vélez)
4. Cali: (Buenaventura, Buga, Cartago, Palmira)
5. Cartagena: (Magangué, Montelibano, Montería, Sincelejo)
6. Ibagué: (Espinal, Florencia, Garzón, Líbano-Honda, Neiva)
7. Manizales: (Armenia, La Dorada-Guaduas, Pereira)
8. Medellín: (Caldas, Girardota, Jericó, Sonsón-Rionegro)
9. Nueva Pamplona: (Arauca, Cúcuta, Ocaña, Tibú)
10. Popayán: (Ipiales, Mocoa-Sibundoy, Pasto, Tumaco)
11. Santa Fe de Antioquia: (Apartadó, Istmina-Tadó, Quibdó, Santa Rosa de Osos)
12. Tunja: (Chiquinquirá, Duitama-Sogamoso, Garagoa, Yopal)
13. Villavicencio: (Granada en Colombia, San José del Guaviare)

== Other Churches ==
Protestantism, primarily Evangelicalism, represents 14% of the population in 2022; international NGOs have stated that indigenous Protestants face threats, harassment and arbitrary detention in their communities due to their religious beliefs.

The Episcopal Diocese of Colombia is a part of Province 9 of the Episcopal Church in the United States of America.

The Church of Jesus Christ of Latter-day Saints in Colombia claims 209,985 members in Colombia.

There is a small Greek Orthodox community in the country.

== Freedom of religion ==
The constitution provides for freedom of religion. However, international NGOs have noted difficulties for indigenous Christians; in particular, indigenous authorities in the Pizarro and Litoral de San Juan municipalities in the Chocó Department have banned the practice of Christianity, and Protestants in particular face threats, harassment and arbitrary detention in their communities due to their religious beliefs.

In 2023, the country was scored 4 out of 4 for religious freedom.

== See also ==
- Religion in Colombia

== Sources ==
- Status of religious freedom in Colombia article
- Colombia article
- US State Dept 2004 report
- Catholic Hierarchy website
