= Barranquilla Colombia Temple =

Latter-day Saint temple in Colombia

- Interactive map of Barranquilla Colombia Temple
- Number: 161
- Dedication: 9 December 2018, by Dallin H. Oaks
- Site: 5.93 acres (2.40 ha)
- Floor area: 25,349 ft^{2} (2,355.0 m^{2})
- Height: 107 ft (33 m)
- Official website • News & images

Church chronology
← Concepción Chile Temple	Barranquilla Colombia Temple	→ Rome Italy Temple

Additional information
- Announced: 1 October 2011, by Thomas S. Monson
- Groundbreaking: 20 February 2016, by Juan A. Uceda
- Open house: Scheduled for 3-24 November 2018
- Current president: Hernando Camargo Pedraza
- Location: Puerto Colombia, Colombia
- Coordinates: 11°01′00″N 74°51′46″W
- Exterior finish: Limestone
- Baptistries: 1
- Ordinance rooms: 2
- Sealing rooms: 1

The Barranquilla Colombia Temple is the 161st temple of the Church of Jesus Christ of Latter-day Saints, and is located in Puerto Colombia, Colombia. The intent to construct the temple was announced by church president Thomas S. Monson on October 1, 2011, during general conference. It is the second built in Colombia, after the Bogotá Colombia Temple, is the 19th in South America, and is the northernmost temple on the continent.

The temple has a dome, cupola, and a single attached end tower with an angel Moroni statue. It was designed by LAT41 Architects, using the neoclassical architecture of Colombia's Republic period. A groundbreaking ceremony, to signify the beginning of construction, took place on 20 February 2016, with Juan A. Uceda, president of the church's South America Northwest Area, presiding.

== History ==
The Barranquilla Colombia Temple was announced by church president Thomas S. Monson on October 1, 2011, during general conference, and concurrently with the Durban South Africa, Kinshasa Democratic Republic of the Congo, Star Valley Wyoming, and Provo City Center temples.

The groundbreaking ceremony, marking the commencement of construction, took place on February 20, 2016, with general authority Juan A. Uceda presiding. Held during the church’s 50th anniversary year in Colombia, it was attended by local church members, civic leaders, and other dignitaries. In the dedicatory prayer, Uceda asked for the Lord’s blessings on all who would participate in the temple’s construction, including government officials. He encouraged members to make temple worship a family tradition and to engage in family history research.

On July 15, 2019, the church announced that the temple would be constructed on a 5.4-acre property located in the city of Barranquilla, about two miles south of the Caribbean Sea. Preliminary plans called for a three-story structure of more than 25,000 square feet.

Despite the country's historical periods of civil unrest and religious opposition, Colombian Latter-day Saints have remained resilient and devoted since the arrival of the first missionaries in 1966. This faith provided a second temple in their country, nearly two decades after the dedication of the Bogotá Colombia Temple in 1999.

An open house for the Barranquilla Colombia Temple was held from November 3 to November 24, 2018, excluding Sundays, with approximately 35,000 visitors, including community members, leaders, and church members attending.

The Barranquilla Colombia Temple was dedicated on December 9, 2018, by Dallin H. Oaks, first counselor in the First Presidency. He was accompanied by Ulisses Soares of the Quorum of the Twelve Apostles, along with members of the seventy: Enrique R. Falabella, president of the South America Northwest Area; Hugo Montoya, first counselor in the area presidency; and Kevin R. Duncan. The dedication ceremony was broadcast to meetinghouses across Colombia, allowing members throughout the country to participate in the sacred event.

At the time of its dedication, the Barranquilla Colombia Temple served approximately 35,000 Latter-day Saints in seven stakes and two districts headquartered in Colombia’s Caribbean Region.

In 2020, along with all the church's others, the Barranquilla Colombia Temple was closed for a time in response to the COVID-19 pandemic.

== Design and architecture ==
The Barranquilla Colombia Temple uses neoclassical architecture, reflecting Colombia’s Republic period, which followed independence from Spain in the early 19th century. This architectural influence is seen in many historic religious and civic buildings across the country. The temple’s design combines this national architectural heritage with traditional Latter-day Saint temple elements.

The temple is located in the metropolitan area of Barranquilla, in the oceanside community of Puerto Colombia, across from Colegio Alemán, and approximately two kilometers west of Barranquilla. The property sits on a hillside along the highway to Cartagena, offering views of the Magdalena River—Colombia’s largest river—and the nearby Caribbean Sea, which lies about two miles north of the temple. It is also situated roughly seven miles from the Historic Center of Barranquilla.

The site includes a distribution center for purchasing temple clothing and garments, a visitors’ center open to the public, an arrival center, and missionary housing facilities, all connected by a prominent entrance plaza. The landscaping features two rows of palm trees.

The temple is 107 feet (34.5 meters) tall and has a total floor area of approximately 24,000 square feet. The exterior is limestone, sourced from China, and includes architectural features such as carved parapets, a dome, and a cupola—elements typical of the neoclassical style from Colombia’s Republic period. The structure features a single attached end tower, with a statue of the angel Moroni on its top.

The interior includes original art glass, custom rugs featuring blue and gold Colombian motifs, wrought iron and bronze railings, crystal chandeliers, and a grand staircase. One of the most prominent design features is use of the cayena—the rose hibiscus, which is the official flower of Barranquilla City. This floral motif is found throughout the interior, including in the hand-carved woodwork and art glass windows on the upper floor. It also appears in the landscaping surrounding the temple. The temple has two ordinance rooms, a sealing room, and a baptistry.

Symbolism is a central aspect of its design. Architectural and decorative elements such as the cayena flower, palm trees, and angel Moroni statue, each have meaning for church members. The cayena flower is a central decorative and symbolic element within its design. Found in both the interior carvings and art glass, as well as in the exterior landscaping, the motif reflects the temple’s connection to the local culture and geography of Barranquilla City. In Christian tradition, palms represent joy in the Lord and are associated with reverence and celebration, as seen in Christ’s Triumphal Entry into Jerusalem and in scriptural visions of heavenly worship (John 12:13; Revelation 7:9). The angel Moroni statue symbolizes the restoration of the gospel of Jesus Christ.

== Temple presidents ==
The church's temples are directed by a temple president and matron, each serving for a term of three years. The president and matron oversee the administration of temple operations and provide guidance and training for both temple patrons and staff.

Serving from 2018 to 2021, César A. Dávila was the first president, with Miryam H. Dávila serving as matron. As of April 2025, Hernando Camargo is the president, with Claudia de Camargo as the matron.

== Admittance ==
On October 30, 2018, the church announced the public open house that was held from November 3 through November 24, 2018, excluding Sundays. The temple was dedicated by Dallin H. Oaks on December 9, 2018. Like all the church's temples, it is not used for Sunday worship services. To members of the church, temples are regarded as sacred houses of the Lord. Once dedicated, only church members with a current temple recommend can enter for worship. The visitors’ center is open to the public.

== See also ==

Temples in and near Colombia
= Operating
= Under construction
= Announced
= Temporarily Closed

- List of temples of The Church of Jesus Christ of Latter-day Saints
- List of temples of The Church of Jesus Christ of Latter-day Saints by geographic region
- Comparison of temples of The Church of Jesus Christ of Latter-day Saints
- Temple architecture (Latter-day Saints)
- The Church of Jesus Christ of Latter-day Saints in Colombia
