= Rock Church =

Rock Church may refer to a number of different churches including:

== Ethiopia ==
There are numerous rock churches, see under Monolithic church

== Finland ==
- Temppeliaukio Church, a rock-hewn church in Helsinki

== United Kingdom ==
- Church of St Peter and St Paul, Rock, in Worcestershire, England

== United States ==
- Rock Church (Auburn, Wyoming), a historic church building
- Rock Church (San Diego), a megachurch in the Liberty Station neighborhood of San Diego, California
- St. Olaf Kirke, a Lutheran church near Cranfills Gap, Texas
