= Freedom of religion in Colombia =

Freedom of religion in Colombia is enforced by the State and well tolerated in the Colombian culture. The Republic of Colombia has an area of 439,735 square miles (1,138,908 square kilometers) and its population is estimated at 46 million.

Although the government does not keep official statistics on religious affiliation, a 2010 limited survey found

- 70.0% Roman Catholic
- 0.9% Charismatic Catholic
- 14.4% Evangelical Christian
- 1.6% Pentecostal
- 0.3% Charismatic Evangelicals
- 0.4% Protestant
- 2.5% Agnostic
- 2.2% Atheist
- 3.5% Theistic but no religion
- 1.3% Jehovah's Witnesses
- 0.5% Adventist
- 0.1% Muslim
- 2.2% No response

According to Latinobarómetro's 2017 survey, 73% of the population is Roman Catholic, 14% is Protestant, and 11% is atheist/ agnostic.

== Other religious statistics ==
The National Administrative Department of Statistics (DANE) does not collect religious statistics, and accurate reports are difficult to obtain. However, based on various studies and a survey, about 90% of the population adheres to Christianity, the majority of which (70.9%) are Roman Catholic, while a significant minority (16.7%) adhere to Protestantism (primarily Evangelicalism). Some 4.7% of the population is atheist or agnostic, while 3.5% claim to believe in God but do not follow a specific religion. 1.8% of Colombians adhere to Jehovah's Witnesses and Adventism and less than 1% adhere to other religions, such as Islam, Judaism, Buddhism, Mormonism, Hinduism, Indigenous religions, Hare Krishna movement, Rastafari movement, Eastern Orthodox Church, and spiritual studies. The remaining people either did not respond or replied that they did not know. In addition to the above statistics, 35.9% of Colombians reported that they did not practice their faith actively.

== Legal status ==
While Colombia remains a mostly Roman Catholic country by baptism numbers, the 1991 Colombian constitution guarantees freedom and equality of religion.

The Colombian Constitution of 1991 abolished the previous condition of the Roman Catholic Church as state church, and it includes two articles providing for freedom of worship:

- Art. 13: States that "all people are legally born free and equal" and that they will not be discriminated on the basis of "gender, race, national or familial origin, language, religion, political or philosophical opinion".
- Art. 19: Which expressly guarantees freedom of religion. "Freedom of religion is guaranteed. Every individual has the right to freely profess his/her religion and to disseminate it individually or collectively. All religious faiths and churches are equally free before the law."

== Freedom of religion ==
The constitution provides for freedom of religion. However, international NGOs have noted difficulties for indigenous Christians; in particular, indigenous authorities in the Pizarro and Litoral de San Juan municipalities in the Chocó Department have banned the practice of Christianity, and Protestants in particular face threats, harassment and arbitrary detention in their communities due to their religious beliefs.

Armed conflict in the country has also led illegal groups to see the presence of a strong church as a threat to their authority, leading to censorship or a ban on public worship.

In 2023, the country was scored 4 out of 4 for religious freedom.

In the same year, the country was rank as the 22nd most difficult place in the world to be a Christian.

== See also ==
- Religion in Colombia
- Christianity in Colombia
- Islam in Colombia
- Hinduism in Colombia
- Baháʼí Faith in Colombia
- History of the Jews in Colombia
