= Houston Texas Temple =

LDS Church temple in Houston, Texas, US

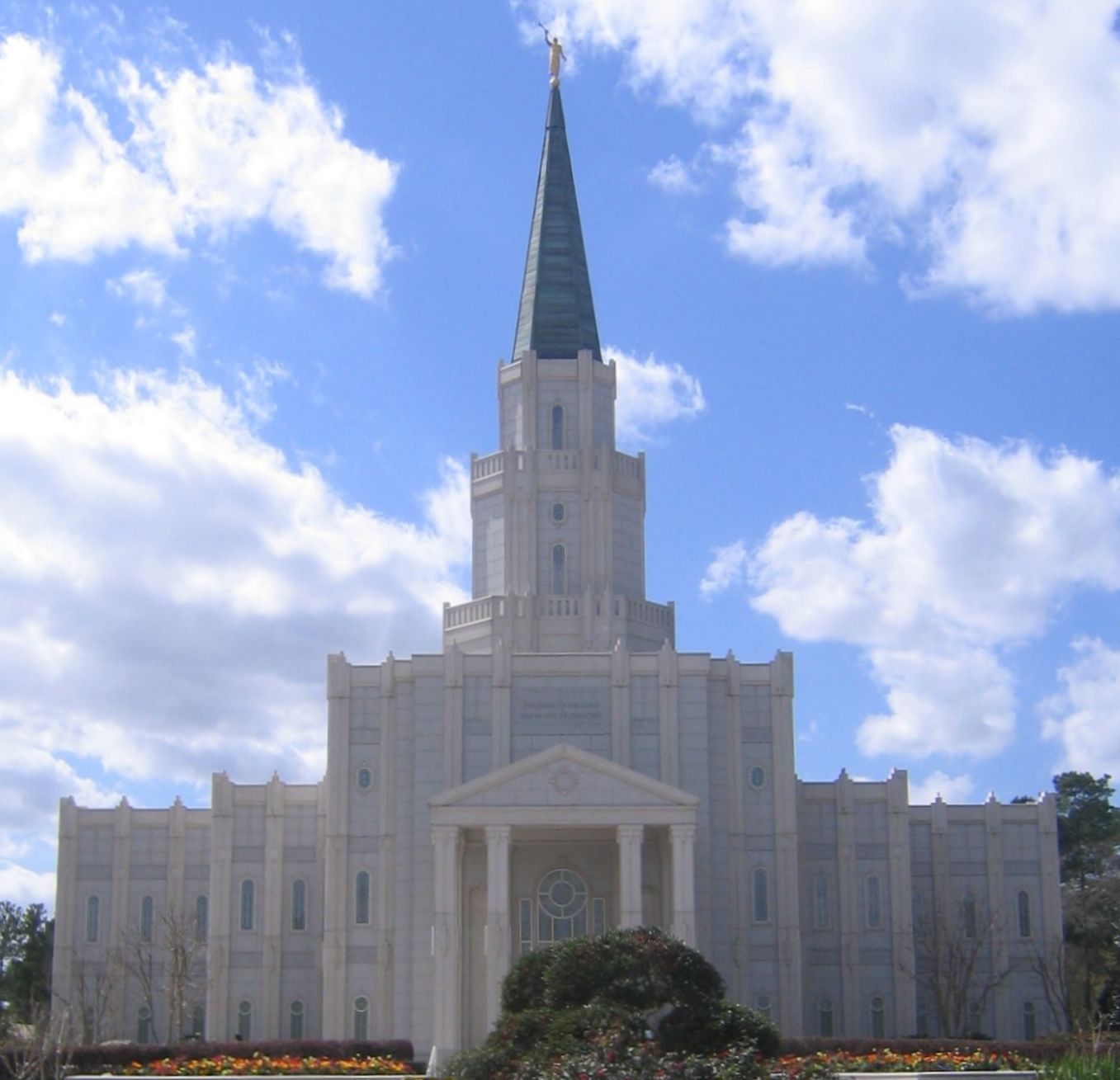
- Interactive map of Houston Texas Temple
- Number: 97
- Dedication: August 26, 2000, by Gordon B. Hinckley
- Site: 11 acres (4.5 ha)
- Floor area: 33,970 ft^{2} (3,156 m^{2})
- Height: 159 ft (48 m)
- Official website • News & images

Church chronology
← Caracas Venezuela Temple	Houston Texas Temple	→ Birmingham Alabama Temple

Additional information
- Announced: September 30, 1997, by Gordon B. Hinckley
- Groundbreaking: June 13, 1998, by Lynn A. Mickelsen
- Open house: August 5–22, 2000
- Rededicated: April 22, 2018, by M. Russell Ballard
- Current president: Randy C Tolman
- Designed by: Spencer Partnership Architects and Church A&E Services
- Location: Spring, Texas, United States
- Coordinates: 29°59′59″N 95°32′00″W
- Exterior finish: Luna pearl granite
- Design: Classic modern, single-spire design
- Baptistries: 1
- Ordinance rooms: 2 (stationary)
- Sealing rooms: 3
- Clothing rental: Yes
- Notes: Rededicated after repairing damage from Hurricane Harvey

The Houston Texas Temple is a temple of the Church of Jesus Christ of Latter-day Saints (LDS Church) in Klein, Texas, a suburb of Houston. The intent to build the temple was announced on September 30, 1997, by church president Gordon B. Hinckley, during general conference. It was the second built in Texas, following Dallas, and is the church's 97th operating temple. The temple has a single spire with a gold statue of the angel Moroni on its top, and was designed by the Spencer Partnership, using a classic modern style combined with traditional Latter-day Saint design.

A groundbreaking ceremony, marking the commencement of construction, was held on June 13, 1998, and was presided over by Lynn A. Mickelsen of the Seventy. The temple was dedicated on August 26, 2000, by Hinckley in three sessions. The structure is 33,970 square feet and includes two ordinance rooms, three sealing rooms, and a baptistry.

In 2017, significant flooding caused by Hurricane Harvey severely damaged parts of the temple, leading to a major renovation project. The temple was closed for repairs, and after extensive restoration work, it was rededicated by M. Russell Ballard on April 22, 2018. During the renovation, 54 new pieces of artwork were added to enhance the spiritual atmosphere of the temple.

The temple serves over forty-four thousand Latter-day Saints in east Texas, and a few congregations in southwest Louisiana.

== History ==
After the September 1997 announcement that the LDS Church would build a temple in Houston, the search began for an appropriate site. The site chosen formerly belonged to a developer unwilling to sell. Years earlier, however, the developer had gone through difficult financial times and had made a promise to God that if God would help him avoid financial ruin, he would someday "pay God back". When the developer learned what was proposed to be built on his land, he decided to sell the land as his way of paying God back.

The Houston Texas Temple was modeled after the old Washington Chapel, a historic building dedicated by church president Heber J. Grant at 2810 16th Street NW in downtown in downtown Washington D.C., on November 5, 1933. As the most visible symbol of the Church's presence in the national capital until the dedication of the Washington D.C. Temple in 1974, the Washington Chapel featured the angel Moroni on top of its spire—a symbol typically reserved for temples. In 1977, the Washington Chapel was sold to Columbia Road Recording Studios, who then sold it to the Unification Church. The angel Moroni statue was removed before the property transferred hands. The chapel was sold 20 years before the Houston Texas Temple was announced.

Following completion of construction, a public open house, held from August 5 through August 22, 2000, drew approximately 27,800 visitors. Church president Gordon B. Hinckley dedicated the Houston Texas Temple on August 26, 2000. In 2017, Hurricane Harvey caused significant flood damage. While the temple had not been in use since August, the church formally announced its closure for renovations in October 2017. Following completion of the renovations, the temple was rededicated by M. Russell Ballard on April 22, 2018.

In 2020, like all the church's others, the Houston Texas Temple was closed for a time in response to the COVID-19 pandemic.

== Design and Architecture ==
The building uses both a classic modern and traditional Latter-day Saint temple design. The temple was designed by the Spencer Partnership in collaboration with the church's in-house architectural team. The temple is on an 8-acre plot, and the landscaping around the temple has gardens and a central fountain.

The structure has multiple stories and is constructed with Luna Pearl granite. The exterior has a single spire with a gold angle Moroni statue. The design uses elements that reflect both the local culture and broader church symbolism.

The interior has elegant design elements, centered around a celestial room to create a spiritually uplifting environment. The temple includes two instruction rooms, three sealing rooms, and a baptistry, each arranged for ceremonial use.

The design has elements representing Latter-day Saint symbolism, to provide deeper spiritual meaning to its appearance and function. Symbolism is important to church members, which includes the angel Moroni statue, representing the restoration of the gospel.

=== Renovations ===
A significant renovation project started in 2017, following severe flooding caused by Hurricane Harvey. On August 26, 2017, floodwaters breached the temple, inundating the basement, main floor, and annex building with over a foot of water. The baptistry was completely submerged, and several inches of water damaged carpets and furniture on the main floor. The second floor remained unaffected. The Church later closed the temple for repairs and refurbishments.

The renovations focused on structural repairs, interior redesign, and the addition of new artwork. The renovation was expedited and was completed in approximately seven months, nearly half the expected duration, and was completed under budget. This swift turnaround was considered “nothing short of a miracle” by church leaders.

The renovated temple was rededicated on April 22, 2018, by M. Russell Ballard, acting president of the Quorum of the Twelve Apostles. The rededication ceremony was a single, invitation-only session without the customary open house or cultural celebrations.

== See also ==
Dallas-Fort Worth Temples

Temples in Texas and Oklahoma

- = Operating
- = Under construction
- = Announced
- = Temporarily Closed

- William R. Bradford, former temple president
- Comparison of temples of The Church of Jesus Christ of Latter-day Saints
- List of temples of The Church of Jesus Christ of Latter-day Saints
- List of temples of The Church of Jesus Christ of Latter-day Saints by geographic region
- Temple architecture (Latter-day Saints)
- The Church of Jesus Christ of Latter-day Saints in Texas

== Additional reading ==
- Holmes, Cecile S. (March 10, 1997), "Mormons plan to build Houston-area temple", Houston Chronicle, p. A-33
- Nielsen, Wendy; Rasmussen, Harriet (June 20, 1998), "Ground broken for temple in Houston", Church News
- Leon and Becky Rowley (July 11, 1998), "On the bright side", Church News
- "Angel Moroni statues placed atop 2 temples", Church News, June 26, 1999
- "Houston Texas Temple dedication dates announced", Church News, June 17, 2000
- Swensen, Jason (September 2, 2000), "Elegant temple is dedicated in Houston", Church News
- Swensen, Jason; Weaver, Sarah Jane (June 16, 2001), "Clean up after tropical storm floods Houston", Church News
