= Star Valley Wyoming Temple =

Temple of The Church of Jesus Christ of Latter-day Saints

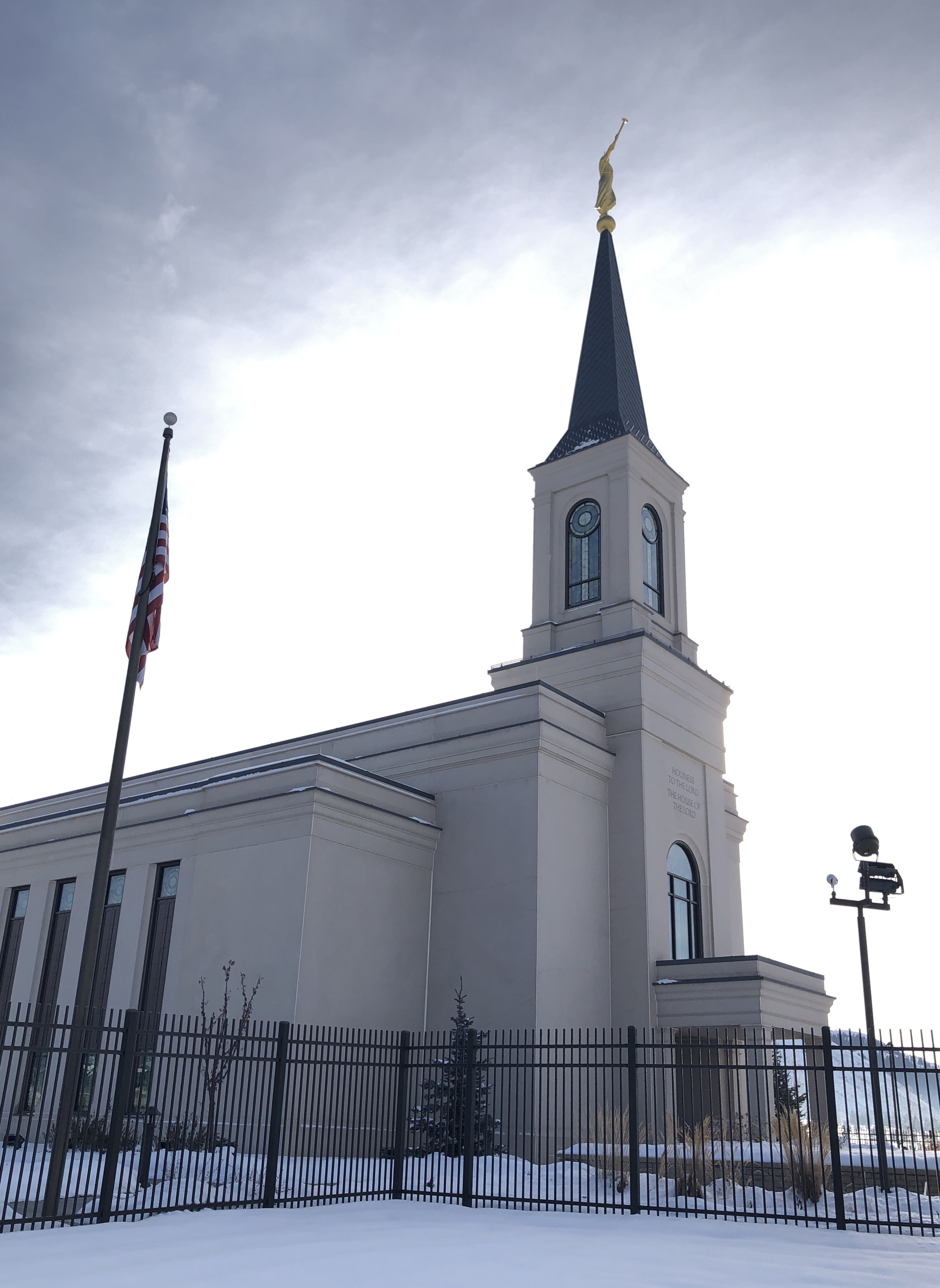
- Star Valley Wyoming Temple Church of Jesus Christ
- Interactive map of Star Valley Wyoming Temple
- Number: 154
- Dedication: October 30, 2016, by David A. Bednar
- Site: 43.6 acres (17.6 ha)
- Floor area: 18,609 ft^{2} (1,728.8 m^{2})
- Height: 123 ft (37 m)
- Official website • News & images

Church chronology
← Fort Collins Colorado Temple	Star Valley Wyoming Temple	→ Hartford Connecticut Temple

Additional information
- Announced: October 1, 2011, by Thomas S. Monson
- Groundbreaking: April 25, 2015, by Craig C. Christensen
- Open house: Friday, September 23, 2016-Saturday, October 8, 2016
- Current president: Mark W. Taylor
- Location: Afton, Wyoming, United States
- Coordinates: 42°42′44″N 110°55′57″W
- Exterior finish: Precast concrete panels
- Baptistries: 1
- Ordinance rooms: 1 (stationary)
- Sealing rooms: 1

The Star Valley Wyoming Temple is a temple of the Church of Jesus Christ of Latter-day Saints in Afton, Wyoming. The intent to build the temple was announced by church president Thomas S. Monson on October 1, 2011. The temple was announced concurrently with the Barranquilla Colombia, Durban South Africa, Kinshasa Democratic Republic of the Congo, and Provo City Center temples. When announced, the total number of temples worldwide increased to 166. When dedicated in 2016, it became the church's 154th operating temple, and the first in Wyoming.

This temple was designed using a classical architectural style. A groundbreaking ceremony, to signify the beginning of construction, was held on April 25, 2015, conducted by Craig C. Christensen, of the Presidency of the Seventy.

== History ==
The temple was announced by Thomas S. Monson on October 1, 2011. On May 25, 2012, the church announced that the temple would be constructed in Afton, Wyoming east of U.S. highway 89. Craig C. Christensen presided at the temple's groundbreaking on April 25, 2015. Star Valley is in Lincoln County, which has the highest percentage of Latter-day Saints in Wyoming.

After construction was completed, a public open house was held from September 23 to October 8, 2016, excluding Sundays. The temple was dedicated by David A. Bednar, of the Quorum of the Twelve Apostles, on October 30, 2016.

In 2020, like all others in the church, the Star Valley Wyoming Temple was closed temporarily in response to the COVID-19 pandemic.

== Design and architecture ==
The building has a classical architectural style, inspired by the Star Valley Tabernacle, a historic building dedicated in 1909 and still stands in Afton. Designed by David Hunter, the temple's architecture reflects both the cultural heritage of the Star Valley region and its spiritual significance to the church.

The temple is on a 43.6-acre plot, and its landscaping features grass, numerous trees, shrubs, and flowers. These elements are designed to provide a tranquil setting that enhances the sacred atmosphere of the site.

The temple has a single attached end spire with a statue of the angel Moroni. The structure was constructed with precast concrete panels. The exterior has the blue spire and art glass windows depicting fireweed, a local wildflower found in the Wyoming mountains.

The interior has decorative paintings which use Victorian era motifs. The temple also includes a stained glass window rescued from a Presbyterian church in New York. The temple has a baptistry, celestial room, and sealing room, each designed for ceremonial use.

The design uses elements representing the heritage of the Star Valley region, providing meaning to the temple's appearance and function. Symbolism is important to church members and includes the use of fireweed, a local flower found in the Wyoming mountains, in the exterior art glass windows.

== Temple presidents ==
The church's temples are directed by a temple president and matron, each serving for a term of three years. The president and matron oversee the administration of temple operations and provide guidance and training for both temple patrons and staff. The first president and matron, serving from 2016 to 2019, McKell W Allred Glenae D. Allred. As of 2024, the temple’s president and matron are Kirk E. Hathaway and Sheree D. Hathaway.

== Admittance ==
Following completion of construction, the church announced the public open house that was held from September 23-October 8, 2016 (excluding Sundays). The temple was dedicated by David A. Bednar on October 30, 2016, in three sessions.

Like all the church's temples, it is not used for Sunday worship services. To members of the church, temples are regarded as sacred houses of the Lord. Once dedicated, only church members with a current temple recommend can enter for worship.

== See also ==
Temples in Wyoming ()

Temples in Wyoming
= Operating
= Under construction
= Announced
= Temporarily Closed

- List of temples of The Church of Jesus Christ of Latter-day Saints
- List of temples of The Church of Jesus Christ of Latter-day Saints by geographic region
- Comparison of temples of The Church of Jesus Christ of Latter-day Saints
- Temple architecture (Latter-day Saints)
- The Church of Jesus Christ of Latter-day Saints in Wyoming
