= The Church of Jesus Christ of Latter-day Saints in Wyoming =

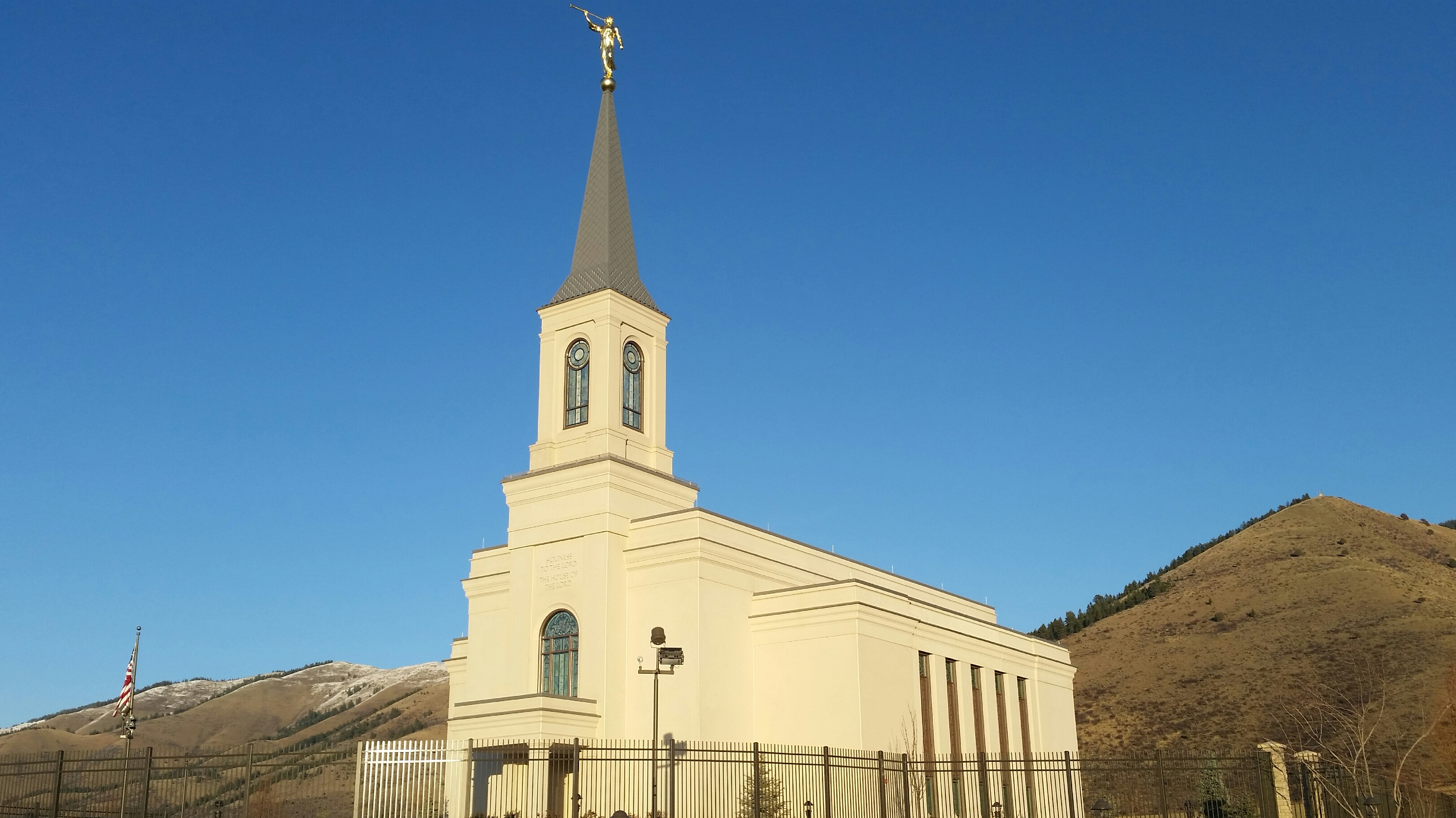
- The Star Valley Wyoming Temple
- Area: US Central
- Members: 66,665 (2025)
- Stakes: 19
- Wards: 143
- Branches: 30
- Total Congregations: 173
- Temples: 2 operating 1 under construction 3 total
- FamilySearch Centers: 46

The Church of Jesus Christ of Latter-day Saints in Wyoming refers to the Church of Jesus Christ of Latter-day Saints (LDS Church) and its members in Wyoming. The church's first congregation in Wyoming was organized in 1877. It has since grown to 66,665 members in 1723 congregations.

Official church membership as a percentage of general population was 11.5% in 2014 which is the third highest in the United States, behind Utah and Idaho. According to the 2014 Pew Forum on Religion & Public Life survey, 9% of Wyomingites self-identify themselves most closely with the LDS Church. The LDS Church is the largest denomination in Wyoming.

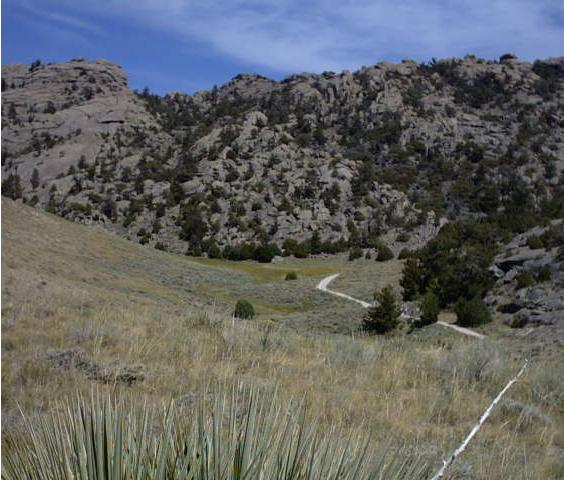
Martin's Cove Wyoming

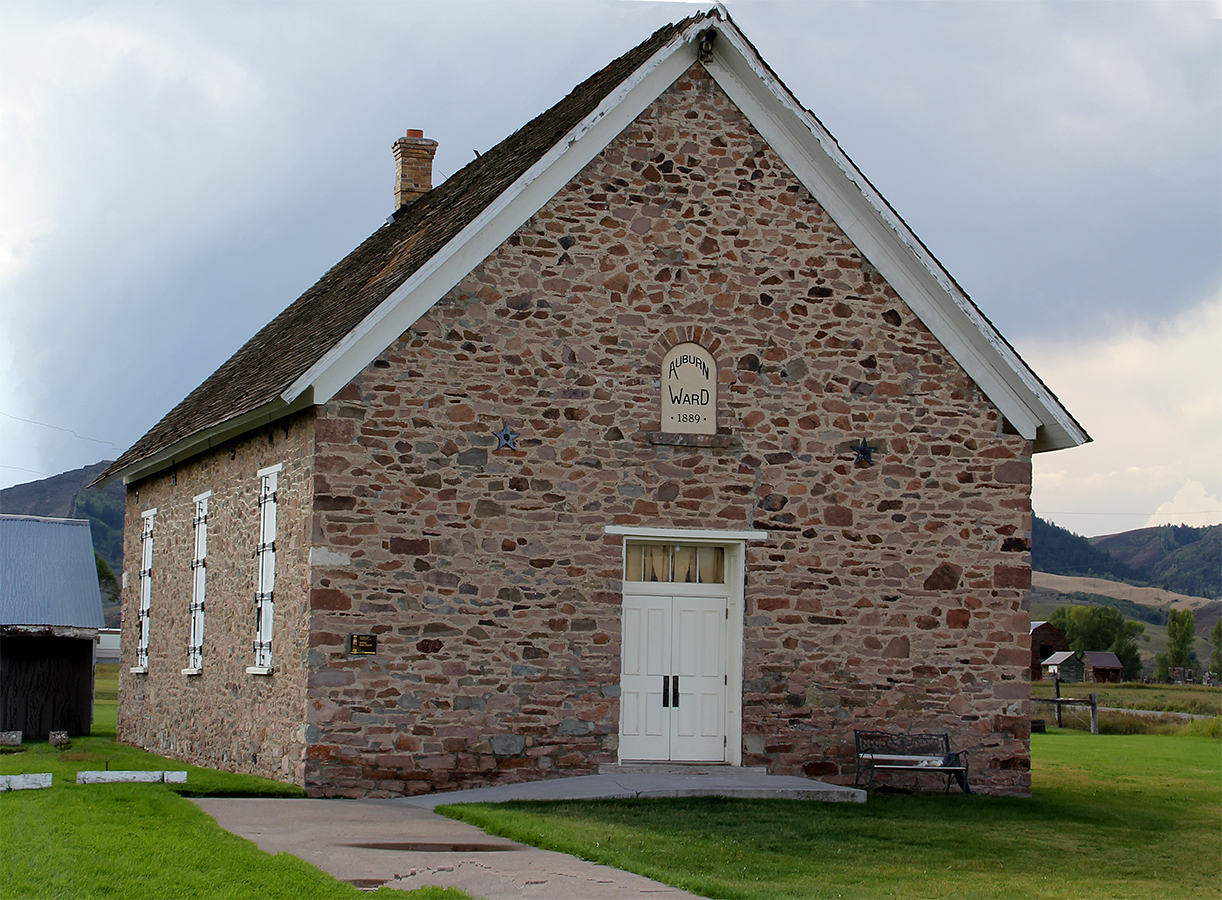
The Rock Church of Auburn, Wyoming

Stakes are located in Afton, Casper (2), Cheyenne (2), Cody, Evanston (2), Gillette, Green River, Kemmerer, Laramie, Lovell, Lyman, Riverton, Rock Springs, Sheridan, Thayne, and Worland.

The Wyoming Mormon Trail Mission was created in 2015 to cover church historical sites in the area, but the mission was discontinued in 2021.

== History ==
Membership in Wyoming
Year	Members
1920	10,764
1930	12,825
1940	17,806
1950	19,477
1960	22,965
1970	27,397
1980	47,314
1990	51,692
1999	54,425
2009	61,430
2019	67,729
2025	66,665
Source: Windall J. Ashton; Jim M. Wall, Deseret News, various years, Church Almanac State Information: Wyoming

The Willie and Martin handcart companies of 1857 became trapped in the winter snows and approximately 200 of the 1,075 in the companies died, but others were saved by Utah rescue parties.

In 1877, members settled the Star Valley area, and in 1878, Brigham Young Jr. dedicated the spot as a gathering place for the members.

== County statistics ==
List of LDS Church adherents in each county as of 2010 according to the Association of Religion Data Archives:

County	Congregations	Adherents	% of Population
Albany	9	2,803	7.7
Big Horn	13	3,901	33.4
Campbell	6	2,247	4.9
Carbon	5	1,538	9.7
Converse	2	723	5.2
Crook	1	128	1.8
Fremont	10	3,618	9.0
Goshen	1	495	3.7
Hot Springs	1	551	11.5
Johnson	1	437	5.1
Laramie	9	4,456	4.9
Lincoln	23	9,556	52.8
Natrona	9	4,809	6.4
Niobrara	1	84	3.4
Park	9	3,180	11.3
Platte	1	308	3.6
Sheridan	5	1,452	5.0
Sublette	2	1,407	13.7
Sweetwater	15	7,972	18.2
Teton	3	1,418	6.7
Uinta	22	10,064	47.7
Washakie	3	1,129	13.2
Weston	1	357	5.0

== Stakes ==
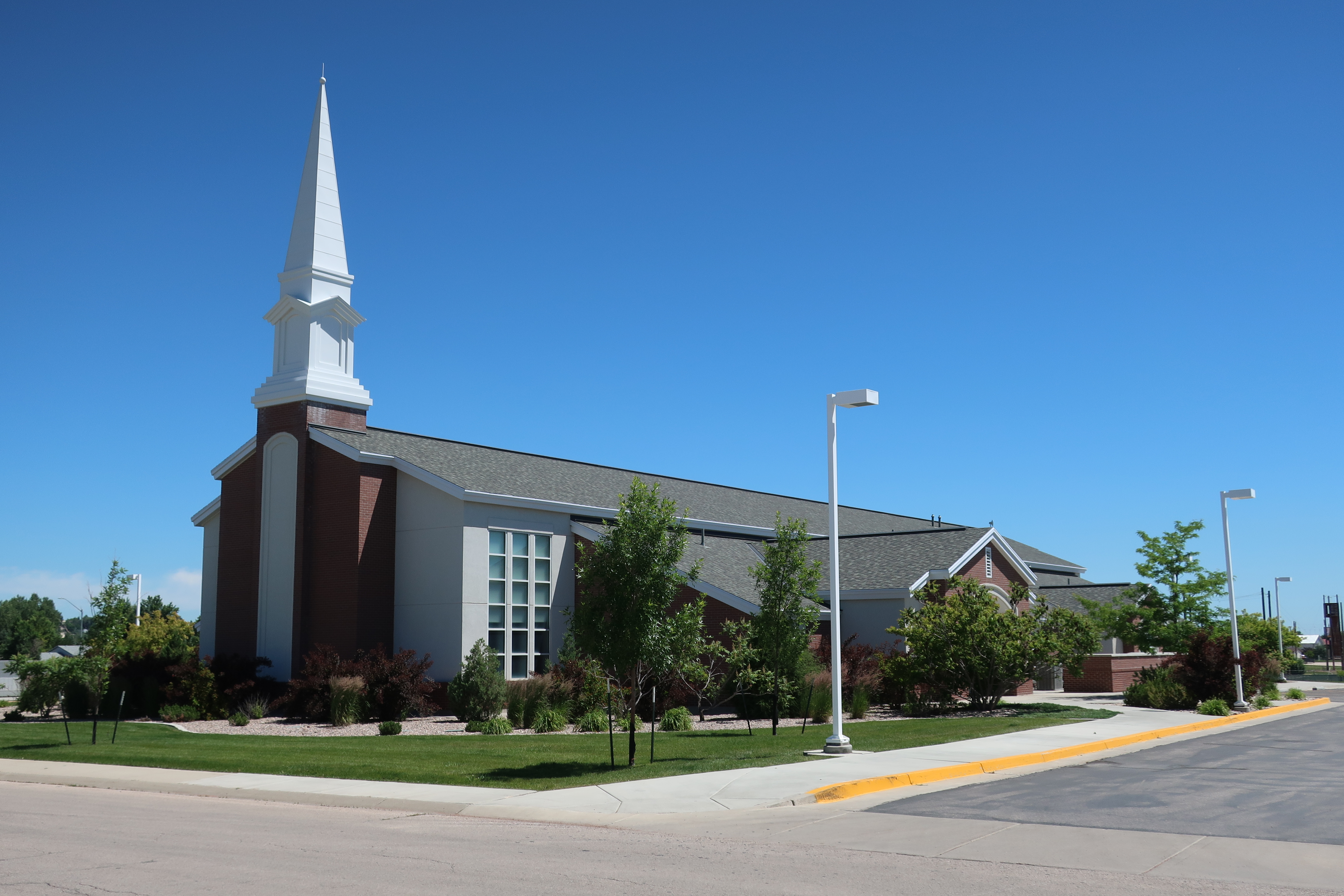
The Gillette Wyoming Stake Center

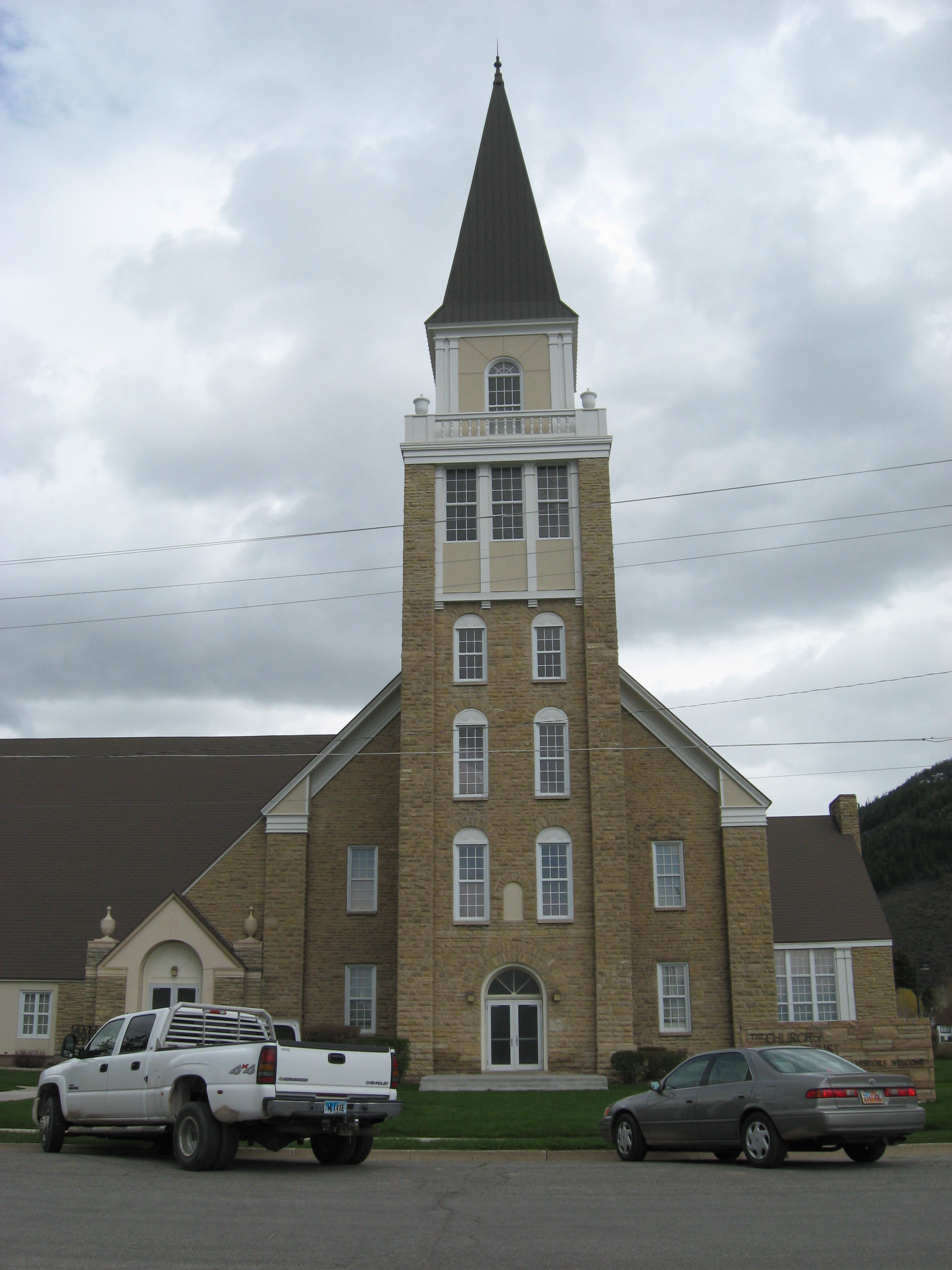
The Star Valley Tabernacle of The Church of Jesus Christ of Latter-day Saints, located in Afton, Wyoming

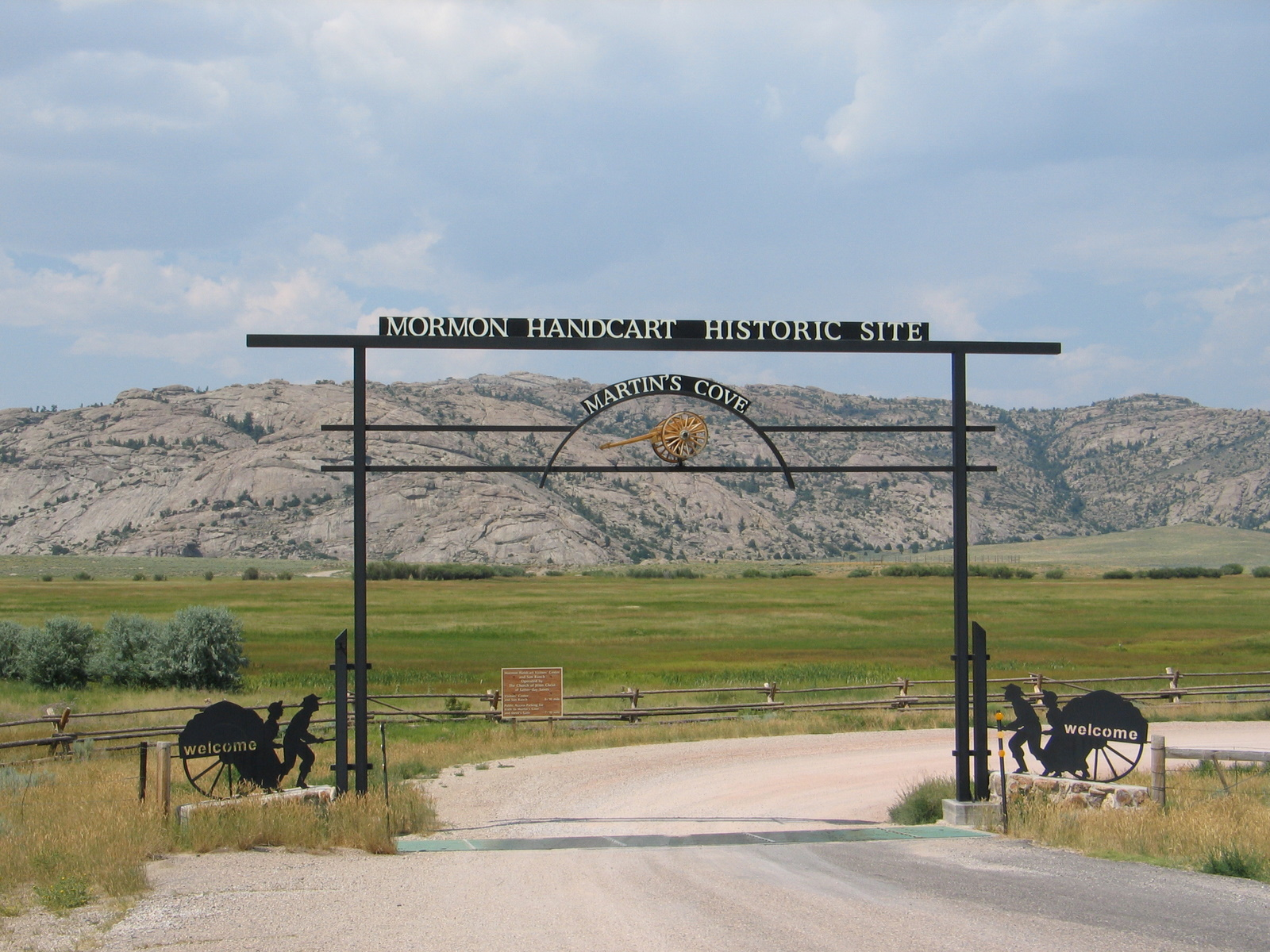
The entrance gate of the Martin's Cove Mormon Handcart Historical Center near Devil's Gate (Wyoming)

As of September 2026, Wyoming was home to the following stakes:

Stake	Organized	Mission	Temple District
Afton Wyoming	14 Aug 1892	Idaho Pocatello	Star Valley Wyoming
Bridger Valley Wyoming	18 Jul 1926	Wyoming Cheyenne	Ogden Utah
Casper Wyoming East	6 Dec 2020	Wyoming Cheyenne	Casper Wyoming
Casper Wyoming	14 Oct 1962	Wyoming Cheyenne	Casper Wyoming
Cheyenne Wyoming East	21 Apr 2013	Wyoming Cheyenne	Fort Collins Colorado
Cheyenne Wyoming	21 Jun 1959	Wyoming Cheyenne	Fort Collins Colorado
Cody Wyoming	7 Jan 1973	Montana Billings	Billings Montana
Craig Colorado (Note: Stake located outside Wyoming with congregation(s) meeting in Wyoming)	15 Oct 2017	Colorado Denver South	Vernal Utah
Driggs Idaho	2 Sep 1901	Idaho Idaho Falls	Rexburg Idaho
Evanston Wyoming South	23 Sep 1984	Wyoming Cheyenne	Ogden Utah
Evanston Wyoming	5 Jun 1898	Wyoming Cheyenne	Ogden Utah
Gillette Wyoming	29 Jun 1980	Montana Billings	Casper Wyoming
Green River Wyoming	23 Sep 1984	Wyoming Cheyenne	Vernal Utah
Kemmerer Wyoming	12 Oct 1975	Wyoming Cheyenne	Star Valley Wyoming
Laramie Wyoming	15 May 1983	Wyoming Cheyenne	Fort Collins Colorado
Lovell Wyoming	26 May 1901	Montana Billings	Billings Montana
Montpelier Idaho South	23 Dec 1917	Idaho Pocatello	Star Valley Wyoming
Riverton Wyoming	14 Oct 1962	Wyoming Cheyenne	Casper Wyoming
Rock Springs Wyoming	18 Jul 1926	Wyoming Cheyenne	Vernal Utah
Salt River Wyoming	23 Aug 2026	Idaho Pocatello	Star Valley Wyoming
Sheridan Wyoming	30 Aug 2020	Montana Billings	Billings Montana
Thayne Wyoming	29 Oct 1978	Idaho Pocatello	Star Valley Wyoming
Worland Wyoming	12 Oct 1980	Montana Billings	Billings Montana

== Missions ==
As of 2023, no missions were headquartered in Wyoming. However, Wyoming is served by four missions headquartered outside the state.

Mission	Organized
Idaho Idaho Falls	1 July 2013
Montana Billings Falls	11 November 1950
Wyoming Cheyenne Mission	1 July 2026

== Temples ==
Temples in Wyoming ()

Temples in Wyoming
= Operating
= Under construction
= Announced
= Temporarily closed

On October 1, 2011, the Star Valley Wyoming Temple was announced by church president Thomas S. Monson. A second temple to be built in Casper was announced on April 4, 2021, by Russell M. Nelson. Nelson announced a third temple, to be built in Cody, on October 3, 2021.

154. Star Valley Wyoming Temple; Official website; News & images	
Location: Announced: Groundbreaking: Dedicated: Size:	Afton, Wyoming, United States; October 1, 2011 by Thomas S. Monson; April 25, 2015 by Craig C. Christensen; October 30, 2016 by David A. Bednar; 18,609 sq ft (1,728.8 m^{2}) on a 43.6-acre (17.6 ha) site
201. Casper Wyoming Temple; Official website; News & images	
Location: Announced: Groundbreaking: Dedicated: Size: Notes:	Casper, Wyoming, U.S. 4 April 2021 by Russell M. Nelson; 9 October 2021 by S. Gifford Nielsen; 24 November 2024 by Quentin L. Cook; 9,950 sq ft (924 m^{2}) on a 9.52-acre (3.85 ha) site The temple's dedication was originally scheduled for October 13, 2024. On August 26, 2024, as the temple's open house began, it was announced the dedication was rescheduled to November 24, 2024.
227. Cody Wyoming Temple (Dedication scheduled); Official website; News & images	
Location: Announced: Groundbreaking: Open House: Dedicated: Size:	Cody, Wyoming, United States; 3 October 2021 by Russell M. Nelson; 27 September 2024 by Steven R. Bangerter; 27 August-12 September 2026 scheduled for 25 October 2026; 9,950 sq ft (924 m^{2}) on a 4.69-acre (1.90 ha) site

== Communities ==
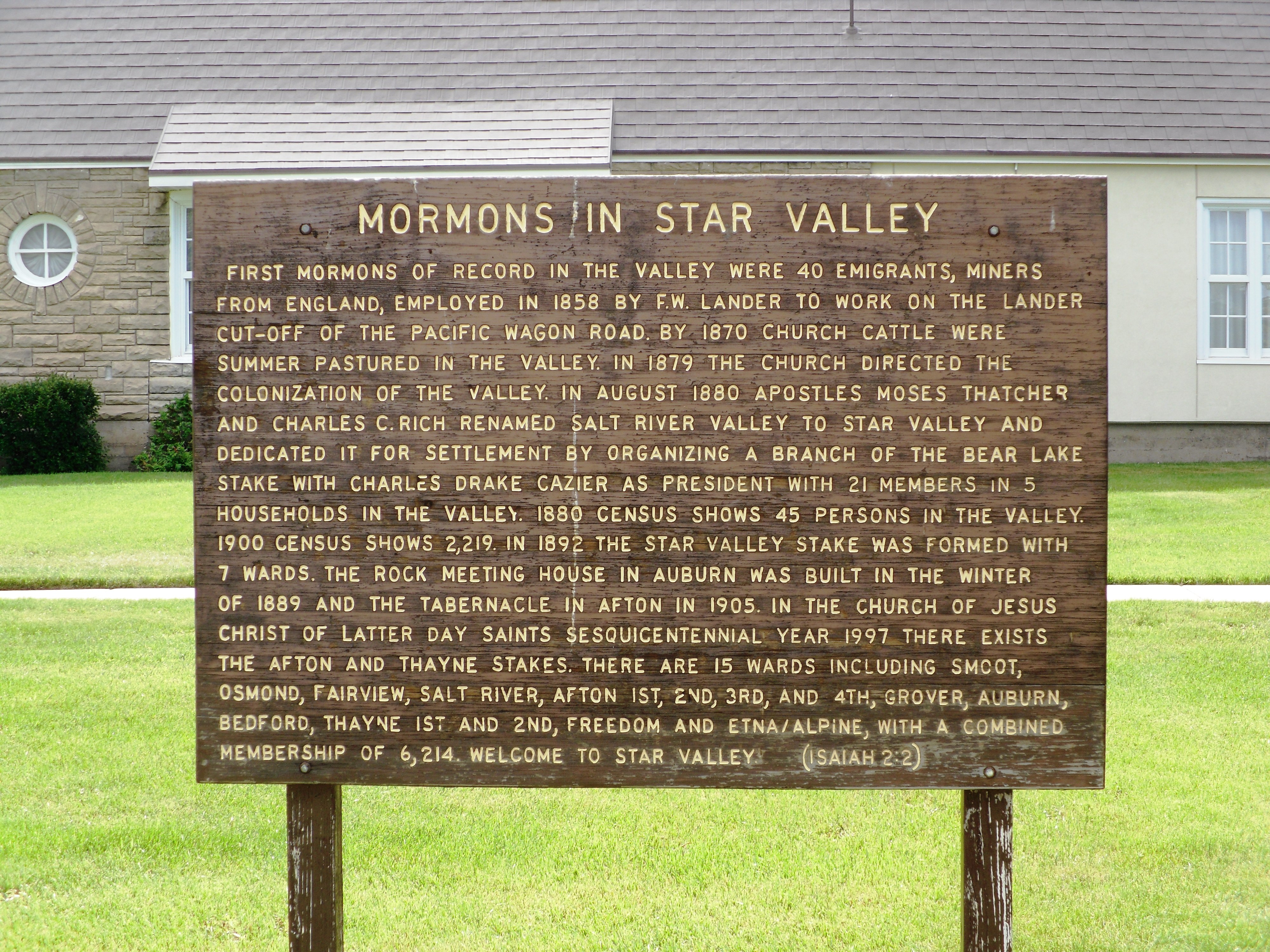

Latter-day Saints had a significant role in establishing and settling several communities within the "Mormon Corridor", including the following in Wyoming:

- Afton
- Auburn
- Bridger Valley (Particularly Lyman and Fort Supply)
- Rock Springs

== See also ==
- Wyoming: Religion
- Bear River
- Devil's Gate
- Fort Bridger
- Fort Laramie
- Green River
- Independence Rock
- Lincoln County, Wyoming
- Martin's Cove
- Mormon Row Historic District
- Mormon Trail
- Pacific Creek
- Rock Church (Auburn, Wyoming)
- South Pass
- Sweetwater River
