= Caracas Venezuela Temple =

Temple in Caracas, Venezuela

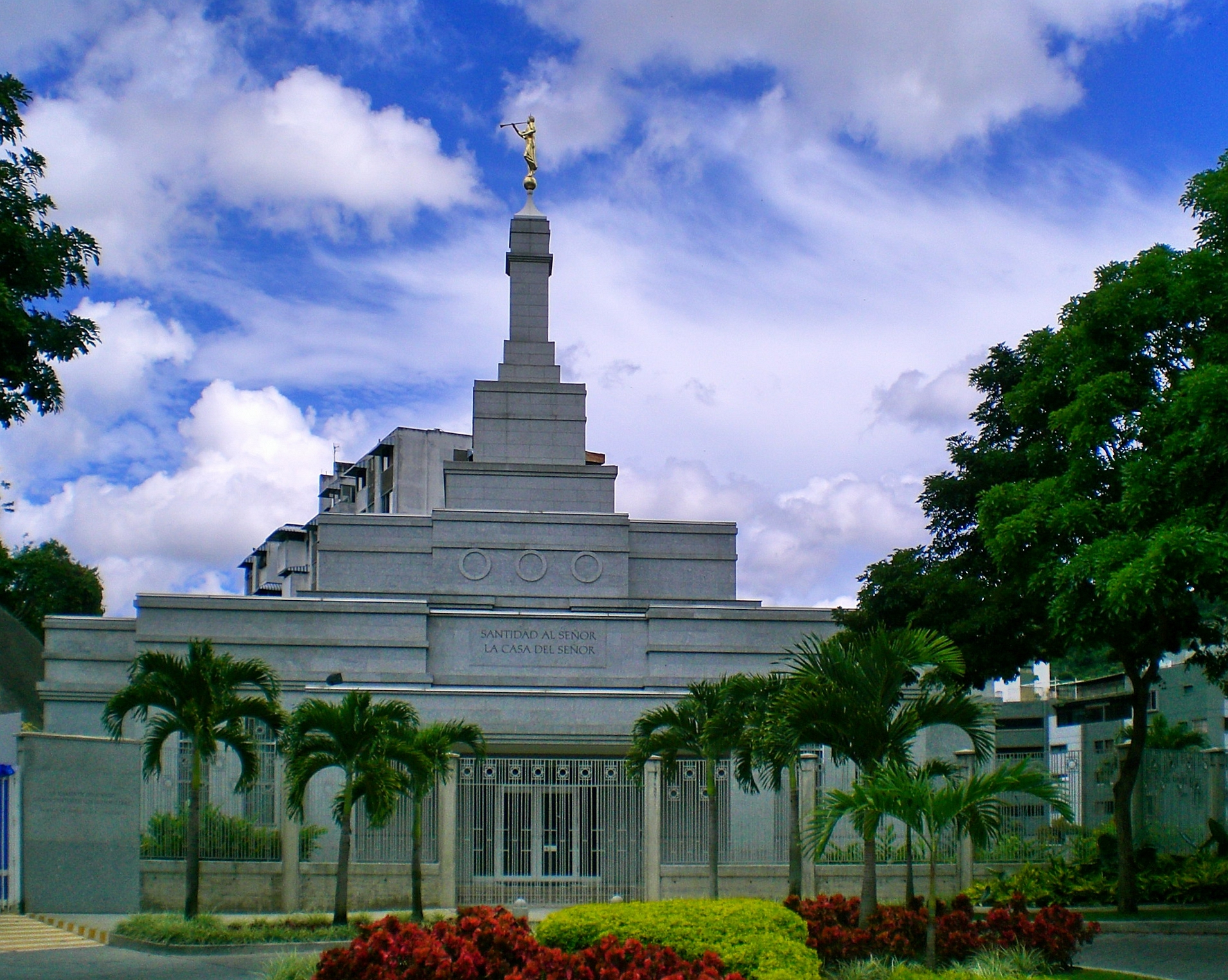
- Interactive map of Caracas Venezuela Temple
- Number: 96
- Dedication: 20 August 2000, by Gordon B. Hinckley
- Site: 0.5 acres (0.20 ha)
- Floor area: 15,332 ft^{2} (1,424.4 m^{2})
- Height: 71 ft (22 m)
- Official website • News & images

Church chronology
← Oklahoma City Oklahoma Temple	Caracas Venezuela Temple	→ Houston Texas Temple

Additional information
- Announced: 30 September 1995, by Gordon B. Hinckley
- Groundbreaking: 10 January 1999, by Francisco J. Viñas
- Open house: 5–12 August 2000
- Current president: Abrahan Eulogio Quero Pernalete
- Designed by: Taller de Arquitectura and Church A&E Services
- Location: Caracas, Venezuela
- Coordinates: 10°28′15.05639″N 66°50′14.25480″W
- Exterior finish: Granite
- Design: Classic modern, single-spire design
- Baptistries: 1
- Ordinance rooms: 2 (two-stage progressive)
- Sealing rooms: 2

The Caracas Venezuela Temple is a temple of the Church of Jesus Christ of Latter-day Saints located in Caracas, Venezuela. Announced on September 30, 1995, by church president Gordon B. Hinckley, it was the church's 96th operating temple and the first in Venezuela, The temple serves members in Venezuela, Trinidad and Tobago, and nearby regions of the Caribbean.

Built on a 0.5-acre site in the Caurimare neighborhood at Avenida C con Calle C-1, the 15,332-square-foot granite structure has a single spire with a statue of the angel Moroni on its top.

== History ==
=== Announcement and planning ===
The church’s presence began in the late 1960s. Church president Gordon B. Hinckley first mentioned the possibility of a temple in Venezuela during the October 1995 general conference — the first broadcast live by satellite in Venezuela. Official plans were later confirmed on May 23, 1998, when church leaders announced the site for construction in Caracas. It was part of Hinckley’s construction of smaller temples worldwide to bring them closer to Latter-day Saints.

At the time of its announcement, the temple served roughly 85,000 members in sixteen stakes and eleven districts, who previously traveled about 2,000 miles (3,200 km) to the Lima Peru Temple.

=== Groundbreaking and construction ===
Groundbreaking took place on January 10, 1999, with Francisco J. Viñas, a general authority and president of the churh's South America North Area, presiding. During the ceremony, Viñas compared the physical foundation of the temple to the spiritual foundation members must build in their own lives, urging preparation for sacred covenants.

The temple’s construction began soon after but was complicated by two landslides caused by an underground spring at the base of the El Ávila mountain range. Despite these challenges, the temple was completed the following year.

=== Public open house and dedication ===
A public open house was held from August 5 to 12, 2000. More than 27,000 visitors toured the temple, with many being exposed to the church for the first time.

The temple was dedicated on August 20, 2000, by church president Gordon B. Hinckley. He was accompanied by M. Russell Ballard of the Quorum of the Twelve Apostles and Robert J. Whetten, president of the South America North Area. Four dedicatory sessions were held, with about 6,000 church members from across Venezuela attending. As Hinckley departed, members gathered outside waving white handkerchiefs and singing “We Thank Thee, O God, for a Prophet” in Spanish. The temple in Caracas was dedicated six days before Hinckley dedicated the Houston Texas Temple, one of several occasions when he dedicated temples on consecutive weekends on different continents.

In 2020, like all the church's others, the Caracas Venezuela Temple was closed for a time in response to the COVID-19 pandemic.

== Design and architecture ==
The Caracas Venezuela Temple is a two-story, 15,332-square-foot structure built on a 0.5-acre site at an elevation of 2,865 feet (873 m). It was designed by Taller de Arquitectura, in collaboration with church architectural and engineering employees. Duane Cheney was the project manager and Jahn was the primary contractor. Its design follows the church’s late-1990s program of smaller, standardized temples with efficient layouts and modern materials. Located in Caurimare, near the base of the El Ávila mountain range, the temple site has a view of Caracas and is about 10 miles (16 km) from the Caribbean Sea.

The exterior has light gray granite and uses a modern classic architecture with a single spire topped by the angel Moroni. It is adjacent to a church meetinghouse and has administrative offices on the same grounds.

The temple’s interior includes two instruction rooms, two sealing rooms, and a baptistry. The interior has marble finishes and local design influences, emphasizing light and reverence.

== Temple leadership and admittance ==
The church's temples are directed by a temple president and matron, each typically serving for a term of three years. The president and matron oversee the administration of temple operations and provide guidance and training for both temple patrons and staff. Luis V. Rodríguez was the first president, with Noris V. de Verguez serving as matron. As of 2024, Abrahan E. Pernalete is the president, with Alirica A. de Quero serving as matron.

ALike all the church's temples, it is not used for Sunday worship services. To members of the church, temples are regarded as sacred houses of the Lord. Once dedicated, only church members with a current temple recommend can enter for worship.

== See also ==

= Operating
= Under construction
= Announced
= Temporarily Closed

- Comparison of temples of The Church of Jesus Christ of Latter-day Saints
- List of temples of The Church of Jesus Christ of Latter-day Saints
- List of temples of The Church of Jesus Christ of Latter-day Saints by geographic region
- Temple architecture (Latter-day Saints)
- The Church of Jesus Christ of Latter-day Saints in Venezuela

== Additional reading ==
- Swensen, Jason (Aug 26, 2000), "Venezuela saints rejoicing at new Caracas temple", Church News
- Swensen, Jason (Oct 28, 2000), "Caracus, city of eternal vision, promise", Church News
- Swensen, Jason (Jan 25, 2003), "Church leaders work to buoy members' spirits: Strife in Venezuela causing political divisiveness", Church News
- "Country information: Venezuela", Church News, Feb 1, 2010
- "'Worth every sacrifice'", Church News, Aug 4, 2012
- Weaver, Sarah Jane (June 16, 2012), "Journey to the temple", Church News
