= The Church of Jesus Christ of Latter-day Saints in Colombia =

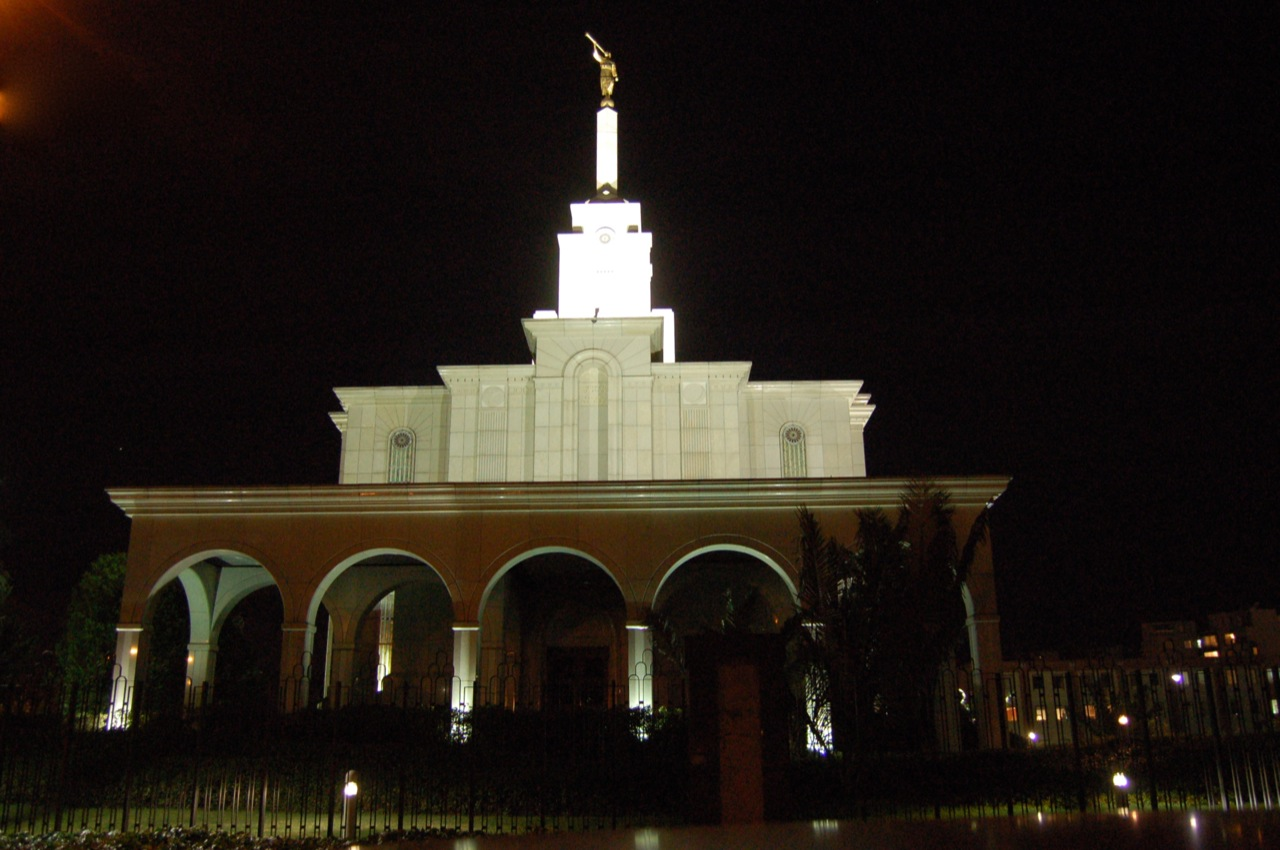
- An LDS temple in Bogotá, Colombia
- Area: South America Northwest
- Members: 223,090 (2025)
- Stakes: 32
- Districts: 9
- Wards: 182
- Branches: 78
- Total congregations: 260
- Missions: 5
- Temples: 2 operating; 1 under construction; 1 announced; 4 total
- FamilySearch Centers: 73

The Church of Jesus Christ of Latter-day Saints in Colombia refers to the Church of Jesus Christ of Latter-day Saints (LDS Church) and its members in Colombia. The first small branch was established in 1966. Since then, the LDS Church in Colombia has grown to more than 200,000 members in 260 congregations, making it the 7th largest body of members in South America and the 11th largest worldwide.

== History ==
Membership in Colombia
Year	Membership
1967	28
1970	1,820
1979	17,507
1989*	76,000
1999	129,105
2009	163,764
2019	209,985
2025	223,090
*Membership was published as an estimate. Source: Wendall J. Ashton; Jim M. Wall, Deseret News, various years, Church Almanac Country Information: Colombia

In May 1966, the first missionaries arrived. Five years later, 27 congregations were established in 10 cities. From 1981 to 1984, Julio E. Dávila served as president of the Colombia Cali Mission of the church. Dávila was the first Colombian to serve as a mission president in the church.

== Stakes and districts ==
Stake/District	Organized	Mission	Temple District
Armenia Colombia District	4 Dec 1981	Colombia Medellin	Barranquilla Colombia
Barranquilla Colombia El Carmen Stake	30 May 1985	Colombia Barranquilla	Barranquilla Colombia
Barranquilla Colombia Hipodromo Stake	31 May 1992	Colombia Barranquilla	Barranquilla Colombia
Barranquilla Colombia Paraiso Stake	31 May 1992	Colombia Barranquilla	Barranquilla Colombia
Bogotá Colombia Ciudad Jardin Stake	2 Mar 1980	Colombia Bogotá South	Bogotá Colombia
Bogotá Colombia El Dorado Stake	18 Oct 1987	Colombia Bogotá North	Bogotá Colombia
Bogotá Colombia El Salitre Stake	16 Mar 1997	Colombia Bogotá North	Bogotá Colombia
Bogotá Colombia Granada Stake	13 Apr 1997	Colombia Bogotá North	Bogotá Colombia
Bogotá Colombia Kennedy Stake	11 Mar 1979	Colombia Bogotá South	Bogotá Colombia
Bogotá Colombia La Libertad Stake	13 Nov 2011	Colombia Bogotá South	Bogotá Colombia
Bogotá Colombia Stake	23 Jan 1977	Colombia Bogotá North	Bogotá Colombia
Bogotá Colombia Suba Stake	16 Mar 1997	Colombia Bogotá North	Bogotá Colombia
Bogotá Colombia Tunjuelito Stake	22 Jun 1997	Colombia Bogotá South	Bogotá Colombia
Boyacá Colombia Stake	28 Jun 2009	Colombia Bogotá North	Bogotá Colombia
Bucaramanga Colombia Stake	22 Nov 1981	Colombia Bogotá North	Bogotá Colombia
Bucaramanga Colombia Terrazas Stake	16 Jan 2005	Colombia Bogotá North	Bogotá Colombia
Cali Colombia Calima Stake	9 Feb 1997	Colombia Cali	Bogotá Colombia
Cali Colombia San Fernando Stake	4 Jun 1978	Colombia Cali	Bogotá Colombia
Cali Colombia Villa Colombia Stake	24 Aug 1979	Colombia Cali	Bogotá Colombia
Cartagena Colombia Los Alpes Stake	18 May 2003	Colombia Barranquilla	Barranquilla Colombia
Cartagena Colombia Stake	15 Jun 1997	Colombia Barranquilla	Barranquilla Colombia
Casanare Colombia District	25 May 2025	Colombia Bogotá North	Bogotá Colombia
Cúcuta Colombia Stake	4 Dec 2005	Colombia Bogotá North	Bogotá Colombia
Florencia Colombia District	29 May 1980	Colombia Bogotá South	Bogotá Colombia
Ibague Colombia Stake	1 Jul 1978	Colombia Bogotá South	Bogotá Colombia
Ipiales Colombia District	8 Jun 1975	Ecuador Quito North	Quito Ecuador
Manizales Colombia District	23 Jan 1981	Colombia Medellin	Bogotá Colombia
Medellin Colombia Centro Stake	10 Dec 2023	Colombia Medellin	Bogotá Colombia
Medellin Colombia North Stake	5 Jun 1988	Colombia Medellin	Bogotá Colombia
Medellin Colombia South Stake	14 Jul 1996	Colombia Medellin	Bogotá Colombia
Montería Colombia Stake	5 Nov 2006	Colombia Medellin	Barranquilla Colombia
Neiva Colombia Stake	25 May 1997	Colombia Bogotá South	Bogotá Colombia
Palmira Colombia Stake	8 Jun 2025	Colombia Cali	Bogotá Colombia
Pasto Colombia Stake	11 Feb 1996	Colombia Cali	Quito Ecuador
Pereira Colombia Stake	19 Dec 1993	Colombia Medellin	Bogotá Colombia
Popayan Colombia District	31 Oct 1989	Colombia Cali	Bogotá Colombia
Santa Marta Colombia District	8 Apr 1985	Colombia Barranquilla	Barranquilla Colombia
Sincelejo Colombia District	10 Sep 1985	Colombia Medellin	Barranquilla Colombia
Soacha Colombia Stake	16 Mar 2003	Colombia Bogotá South	Bogotá Colombia
Valledupar Colombia Stake	12 Nov 2006	Colombia Barranquilla	Barranquilla Colombia
Villavicencio Colombia District	30 May 1980	Colombia Bogotá South	Bogotá Colombia

== Missions ==
Mission	Organized
Colombia Barranquilla	1 Jul 1988
Colombia Bogotá North	1 Jul 1968
Colombia Bogotá South	15 Jan 1992
Colombia Cali	1 Jul 1975
Colombia Medellin	30 Jun 2012

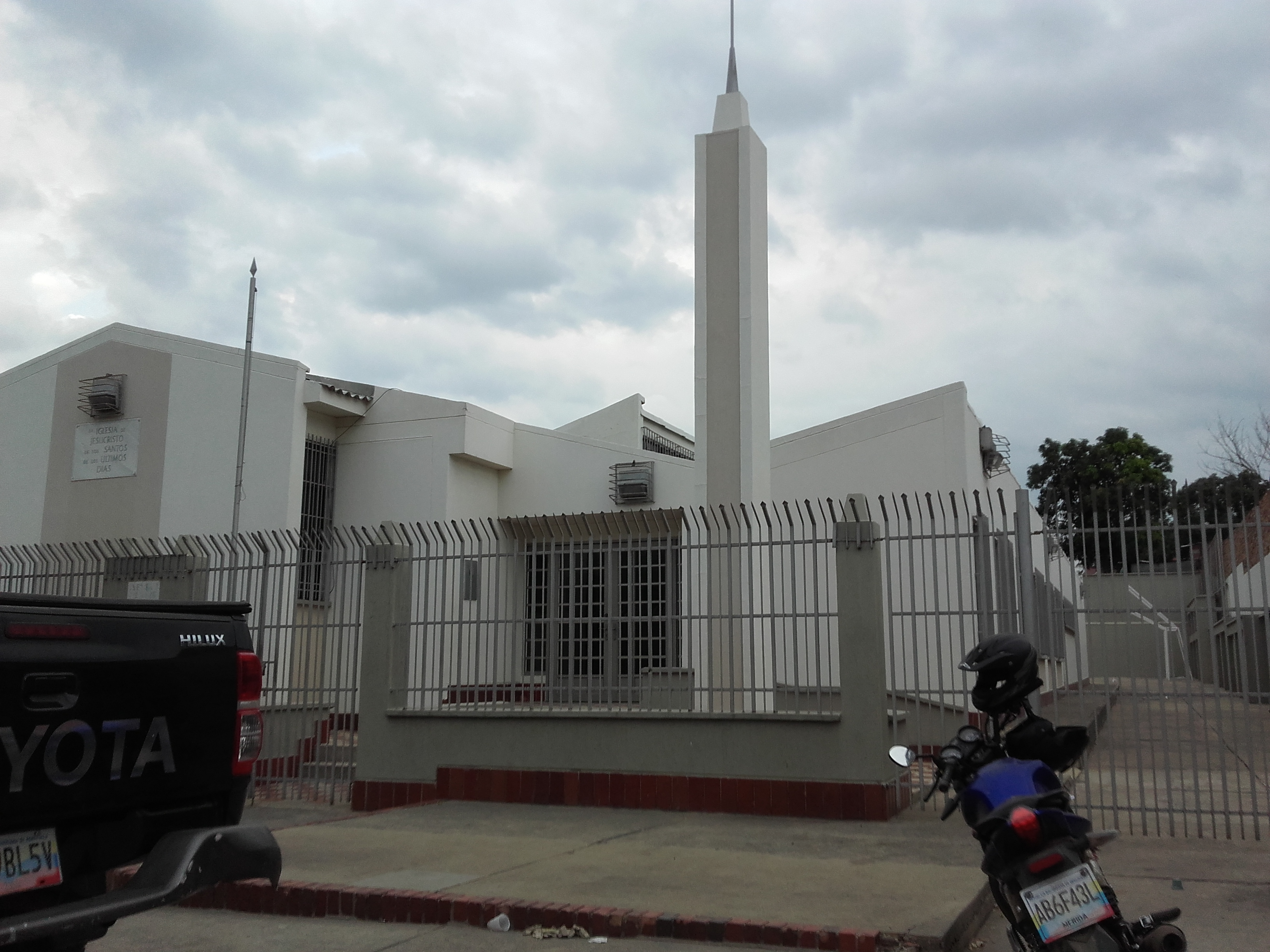
A meetinghouse in Cúcuta

== Temples ==

Temples in and near Colombia
= Operating
= Under construction
= Announced
= Temporarily Closed

57. Bogotá Colombia Temple; Official website; News & images	
Location: Announced: Groundbreaking: Dedicated: Size: Style:	Bogotá, Colombia; 7 April 1984 by Spencer W. Kimball; 26 June 1993 by William R. Bradford; 24 April 1999 by Gordon B. Hinckley; 53,500 sq ft (4,970 m^{2}) on a 3.71-acre (1.50 ha) site Classic modern, single-spire design - designed by Cerrano y Gomez Cuellar
161. Barranquilla Colombia Temple; Official website; News & images	
Location: Announced: Groundbreaking: Dedicated: Size:	Puerto Colombia, Colombia; 1 October 2011 by Thomas S. Monson; 20 February 2016 by Juan A. Uceda; 9 December 2018 by Dallin H. Oaks; 25,349 sq ft (2,355.0 m^{2}) on a 5.93-acre (2.40 ha) site
255. Cali Colombia Temple (Under construction); Official website; News & images	
Location: Announced: Groundbreaking: Size:	Cali, Colombia; 4 April 2021 by Russell M. Nelson; 1 March 2025 by Jorge T. Becerra; 9,500 sq ft (880 m^{2}) on a 3.14-acre (1.27 ha) site
355. Medellín Colombia Temple (Site announced); Official website; News & images	
Location: Announced: Size:	Medellín, Colombia; 6 October 2024 by Russell M. Nelson; 10,741 sq ft (997.9 m^{2}) on a 3.05-acre (1.23 ha) site

== See also ==
- Religion in Colombia
