= Bogotá Colombia Temple =

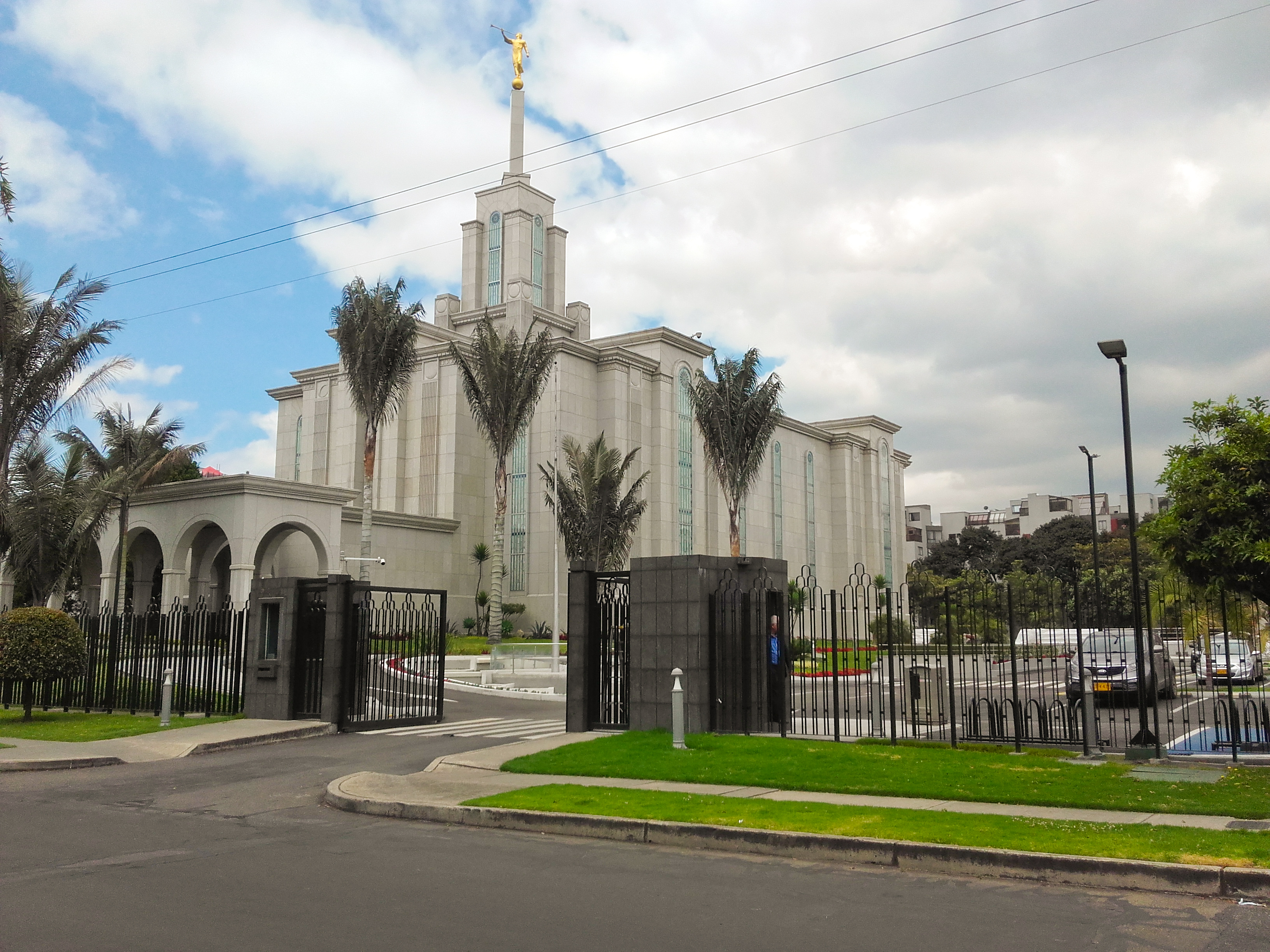
- The Bogotá Colombia Temple
- Interactive map of Bogotá Colombia Temple
- Number: 57
- Dedication: 24 April 1999, by Gordon B. Hinckley
- Site: 3.71 acres (1.50 ha)
- Floor area: 53,500 ft^{2} (4,970 m^{2})
- Height: 124 ft (38 m)
- Official website • News & images

Church chronology
← Madrid Spain Temple	Bogotá Colombia Temple	→ Guayaquil Ecuador Temple

Additional information
- Announced: 7 April 1984, by Spencer W. Kimball
- Groundbreaking: 26 June 1993, by William R. Bradford
- Open house: 27 March – 18 April 1999
- Current president: Edgar Agen Mantilla Vargas
- Designed by: Cerrano y Gomez Cuellar
- Location: Bogotá, Colombia
- Coordinates: 4°42′28.08359″N 74°3′22.48919″W
- Exterior finish: Brazilian granite, Asa Branca
- Design: Classic modern, single-spire design
- Baptistries: 1
- Ordinance rooms: 4 (stationary)
- Sealing rooms: 3
- Clothing rental: Yes

The Bogotá Colombia Temple is a temple of the Church of Jesus Christ of Latter-day Saints in Bogotá, Colombia. A groundbreaking ceremony was held on June 26, 1993 and dedicated on April 24, 1999.

== See also ==

Temples in and near Colombia
= Operating
= Under construction
= Announced
= Temporarily Closed

- List of temples of The Church of Jesus Christ of Latter-day Saints
- The Church of Jesus Christ of Latter-day Saints in Colombia
