= Pentecostalism in Colombia =

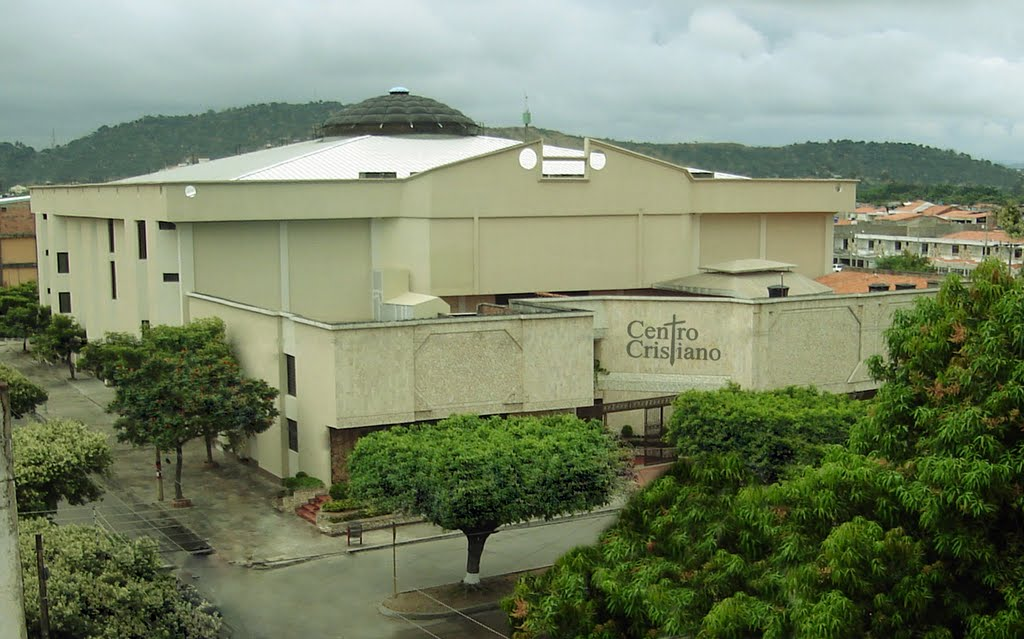
International Christian Center of the Assemblies of God, Cúcuta, Colombia.

The evangelical practices began in the early 1900s in Colombia. Throughout the 20th century, there was a widespread occurrence of Colombians transitioning to Pentecostalism.

== The Beginning of Pentecostalism ==
Pentecostalism was first introduced in Bucaramanga, Colombia, in 1936 by Canadian citizens, Aksel Verner Larsen with his wife and younger son. After two years of evangelizing in Colombia, Larsen had made no progress with converting people to Pentecostalism. Along with his failing work, he has to deal with the trauma of his wife passing away during childbirth leaving him with two children who he sends to other missionaries while he stays in Colombia to continue his work. Despite dealing with life altering events, a small Pentecostal group was started. From this tiny spark, other missionaries from the United States traveled to Colombia to hear the Pentecostal message and spread the word. In Bucaramanga, Larsen and his new wife, Fayette Barnard, founded a new church in a rented house for everyone to practice Pentecostalism in. After some time, the couple decided to travel back to Canada. While making their trip, they missed a flight and got as far as Barranquilla. With this unforeseen opportunity, they began to evangelize on the streets. The results were so promising, they decided to stay in Barranquilla, one of the poorest barrios of the city.

== Social Dislocation ==
After the establishing of two oneness Pentecostal churches by the 1950s, there was a change in Colombia. Starting in 1946, many foreign missionaries began to leave Colombia for their own safety because of La Violencia. With most of the foreign missionaries leaving, Pentecostal religion began to transform into a religion that Colombians could do in private. Rather than drastically changing the public realm it sought to change the private realm, home and family to the centre of both the men and women's lives. Helping to improve the lives of women who were victims of the Machismo and men who were constantly born into the stereotypes. Therefore, with this absence, the time of La Violencia also became the Period of the Awakening. Many people began to secretly follow Pentecostalism. From the 1950s-1970's, Latin America experienced a period of massive urbanization and rapid modernization. With this growth, the socio-economic status of the cities began to change. The Pentecostal churches were on the outside of cities since the first movement. Once people began to move into the city who could afford it, it began to push more to the outskirts of the city. Therefore, more people were being introduced to the Pentecostal churches at this time. The overall message of Pentecostalism and community feel of the churches recreated for the migrants a community or social and material exchange. This community feel and influx of lower-class people created the stereotype that Pentecostalism was for the poor. The appeal of the Pentecostal church for the poor in that it offers practical services that ease the strain of daily life.

== Leadership ==
After the foreign missionaries, national leadership began to emerge, such as pastors Campo Elías Bernal, Domingo Zúñiga, Luis Eduardo Moreno, Sigifredo Valencia and Eliseo Duarte in different denominations.

== Rejection of Catholicism ==
For years leading up to the Evangelical movement, Catholicism had been the primary religion in Colombia. The Pentecostal movement gave people a new idea surrounding religion. "To be Colombian meant one was Catholic." When [La Violencia] began in Colombia, people were looking for outlets or new ways to express themselves which make Pentecostalism more appealing.

== Growing political influence ==
With growing membership, Pentecostal and Neo-charismatic churches have more political power, in Colombia, Latin America in general. The Evangelical opposition in the Colombian peace agreement referendum is considered for many pivotal in its rejection.

== See also ==
- Pentecostalism in Latin America
- Religion in Colombia
