= Religion in Colombia =

Religion in Colombia (CIA World Factbook 2023)
1. Catholicism (63.6%)
2. Protestantism (17.2%)
3. Restorationism (0.70%)
4. Other Christians (0.30%)
5. No religion (16.2%)
6. Other religions (0.30%)
7. Unspecified (1.80%)

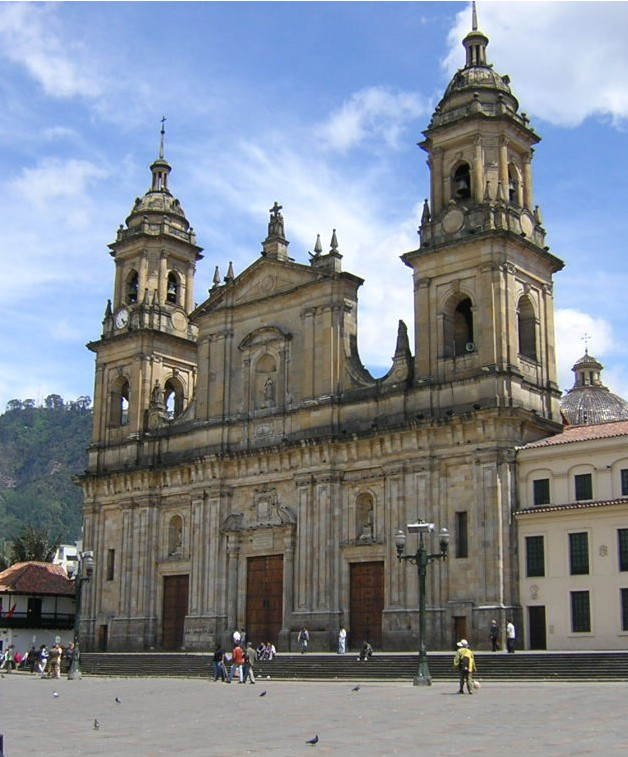
The Primatial Cathedral Basilica of the Immaculate Conception in Bogotá

Religion in Colombia is dominated by various branches of Christianity and is an expression of the different influences in Colombian culture including that of the Spanish, the Indigenous peoples and the Afro-Colombians.

Colombia is a secular country and freedom of religion is enshrined in the nation's constitution. The Ministry of Interior is responsible for formally recognizing churches, religious denominations, religious federations and confederations, and associations of religious ministers.

== Religious freedom ==
The Colombian Constitution of 1991 disestablished the Catholic Church, hitherto the state religion, and includes two articles providing for freedom of worship:

- Article 13 states that "all people are legally born free and equal" and are not to be subjected to discrimination because of their "sex, race, national or familial origin, language, religion, political or philosophical opinion";
- Article 19 expressly guarantees freedom of religion: "Freedom of religion is guaranteed. Every person has the right to freely profess his religion and to disseminate it individually or collectively. All religious confessions and churches are equally free before the law."

In 2023, the country was scored 4 out of 4 for religious freedom by Freedom House.

In the same year, the country was ranked as the 22nd most difficult place in the world to be a Christian by the evangelistic organization Open Doors.

== Christianity ==
=== Catholic Christianity ===
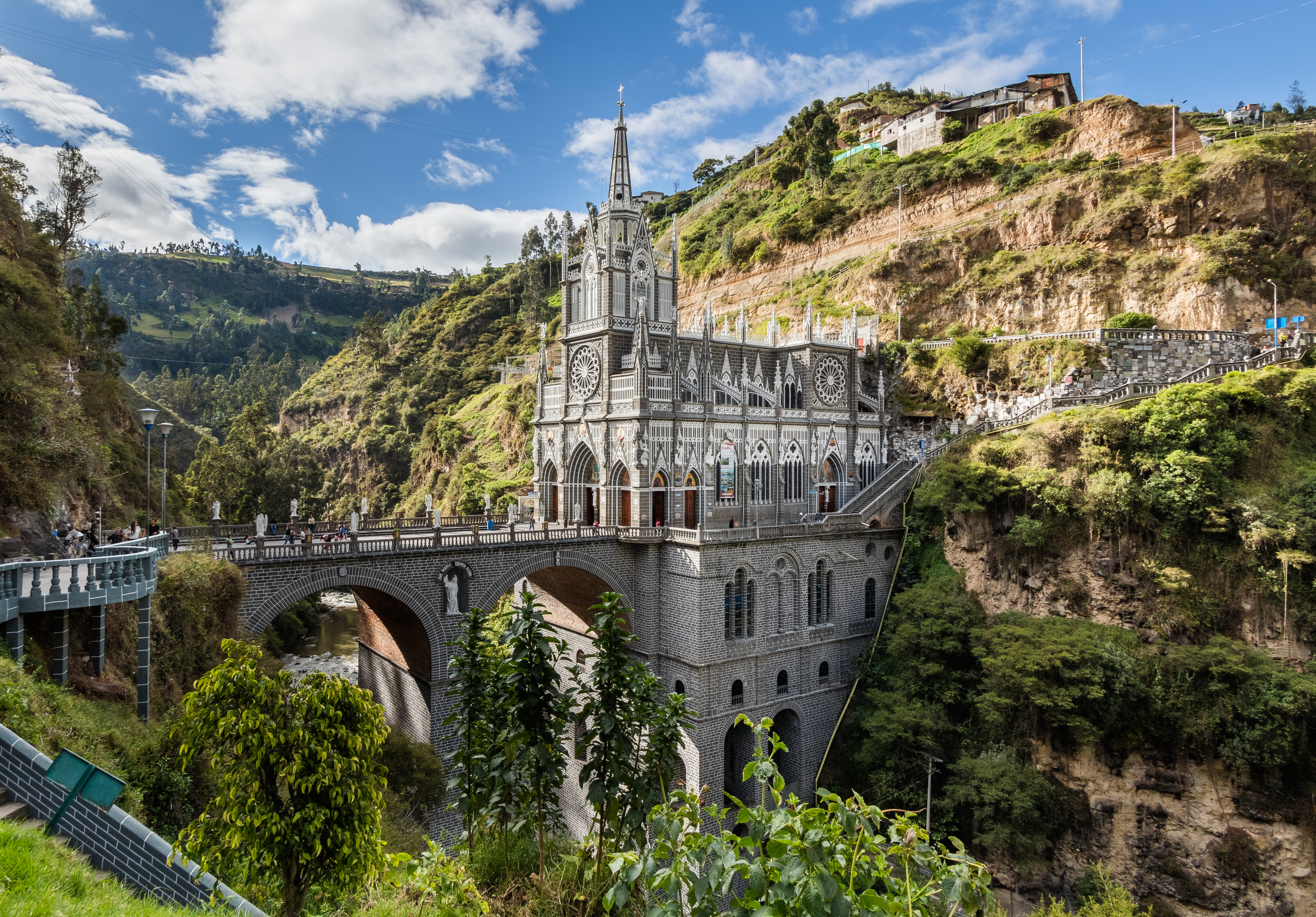
Bridge over the Guáitara at Las Lajas Sanctuary, Ipiales

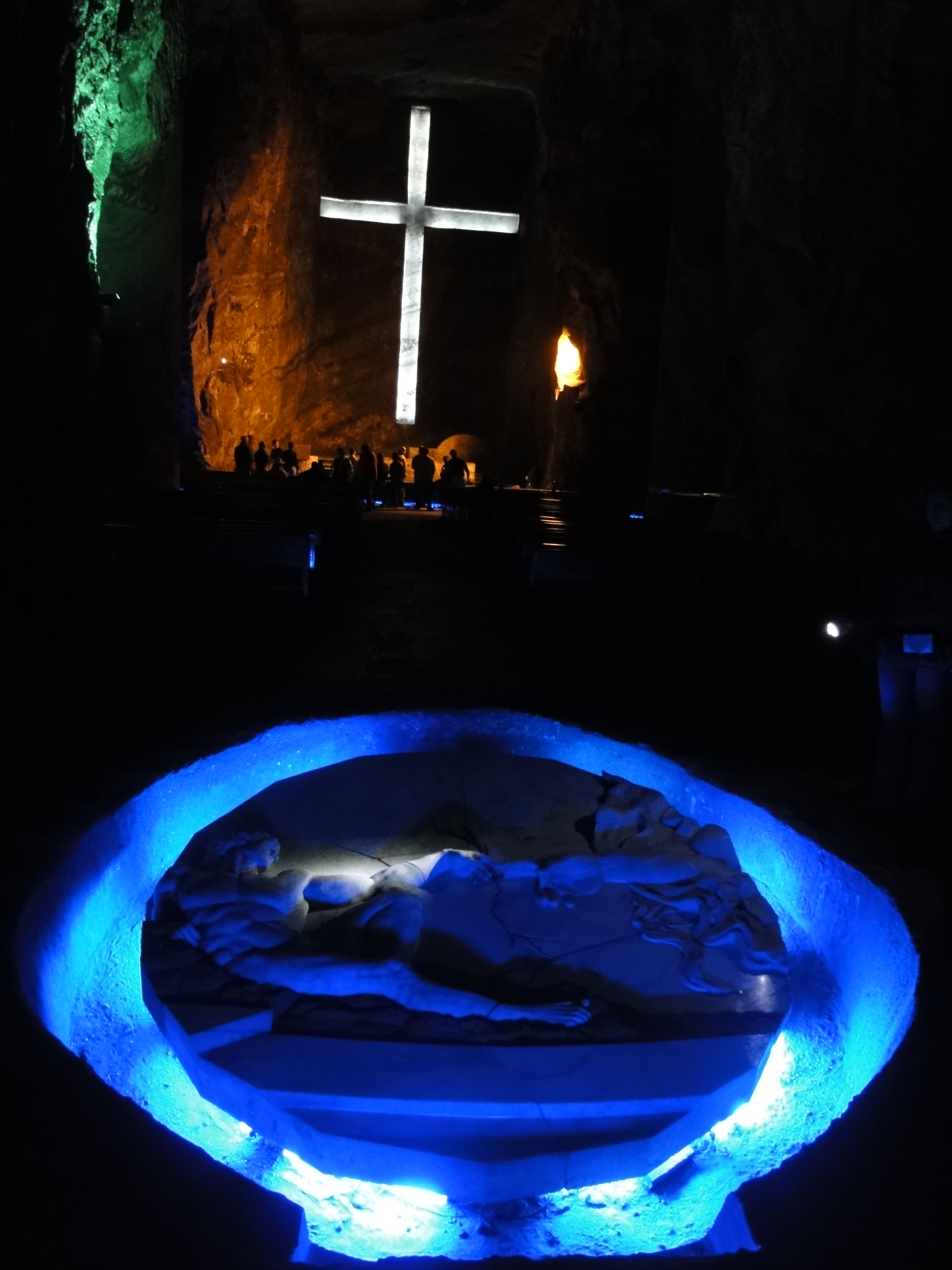
Sculpture of the creation of man in the central nave of the Salt Cathedral of Zipaquirá.

Christianity (Catholicism) was the official religion of the country from the Spanish colonization until the 1991 constitutional reform (National Constituent Assembly), which granted egalitarian treatment from the government to all the religions. However, Catholicism is still the main religion in Colombia by number of adherents, with an estimated 73% of the national population in nominal Catholicism in 2022.

In the colonial period, the Catholic Church was created and in charge of most of the public institutions, such as teaching facilities (schools, colleges, universities, libraries, botanical gardens, astronomical observatories); health facilities (Hospitals, nurseries, leper hospitals) and jails. It also "inherited" a huge amount of land, approx. 1/4 of all the productive land, which was later acquired by the government.

Colombia is often referred as the "Country of the Sacred Heart", due to the annual consecration of the country to the Sacred Heart of Jesus in a Te Deum directed by the president of the republic. Colombia has been re-consecrated to the Sacred Heart of Jesus and consecrated to the Immaculate Heart of Mary in 2008, in a country-wide ceremony celebrated by the main bishops and with the presence of the Colombian president (also a Catholic).

=== Protestant Christianity ===
Protestantism, primarily Evangelicalism, represent 14% of the population in 2022; international NGOs have stated that indigenous Protestants face threats, harassment and arbitrary detention in their communities due to their religious beliefs.

=== Eastern Orthodox Christianity ===
There is a small Eastern Orthodox presence in Colombia, concentrated around cities and metropolitan areas. The Russian Orthodox Church Outside of Russia has Colombia as part of their Diocese of Caracas and South America, ruled by Bishop John (Berzins). The Ecumenical Patriarchate of Constantinople also maintains a presence in Colombia, through their Metropolis of Buenos Aires and all South America, ruled by Metropolitan John (Bosch) since 2019. There is little activity beyond that.

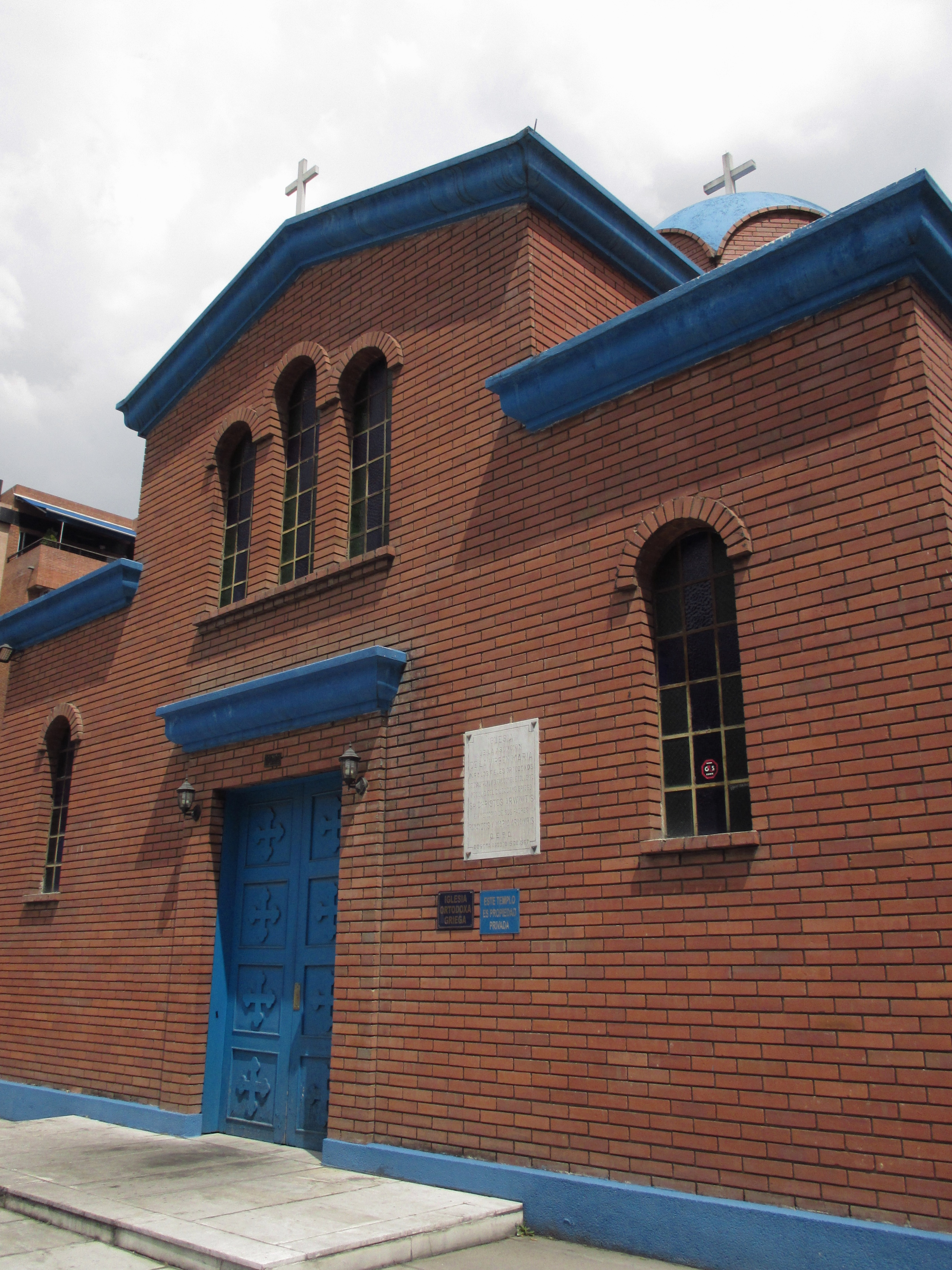
Dormition of the Virgin Greek Orthodox Church, Bogotá

== Religious minorities ==
=== Baháʼí Faith ===
The Baháʼí Faith in Colombia begins with references to the country in Baháʼí literature as early as 1916, with Baháʼís visiting as early as 1927. The first Colombian joined the religion in 1929 and the first Baháʼí Local Spiritual Assembly was elected in Bogotá in 1944 with the beginning of the arrival of coordinated pioneers from the United States and achieved an independent National Spiritual Assembly in 1961. By 1963 there were eleven local assemblies. In the 1980s institutions were developed in Colombia that have influenced activities inside and independent of the religion in other countries: FUNDAEC and the Ruhi Institute.

The Association of Religion Data Archives (relying mostly on the World Christian Encyclopedia) estimated that Baháʼís made up 0.02% of the population in 2020; local leaders estimate that they make up over 1%.

=== Islam ===
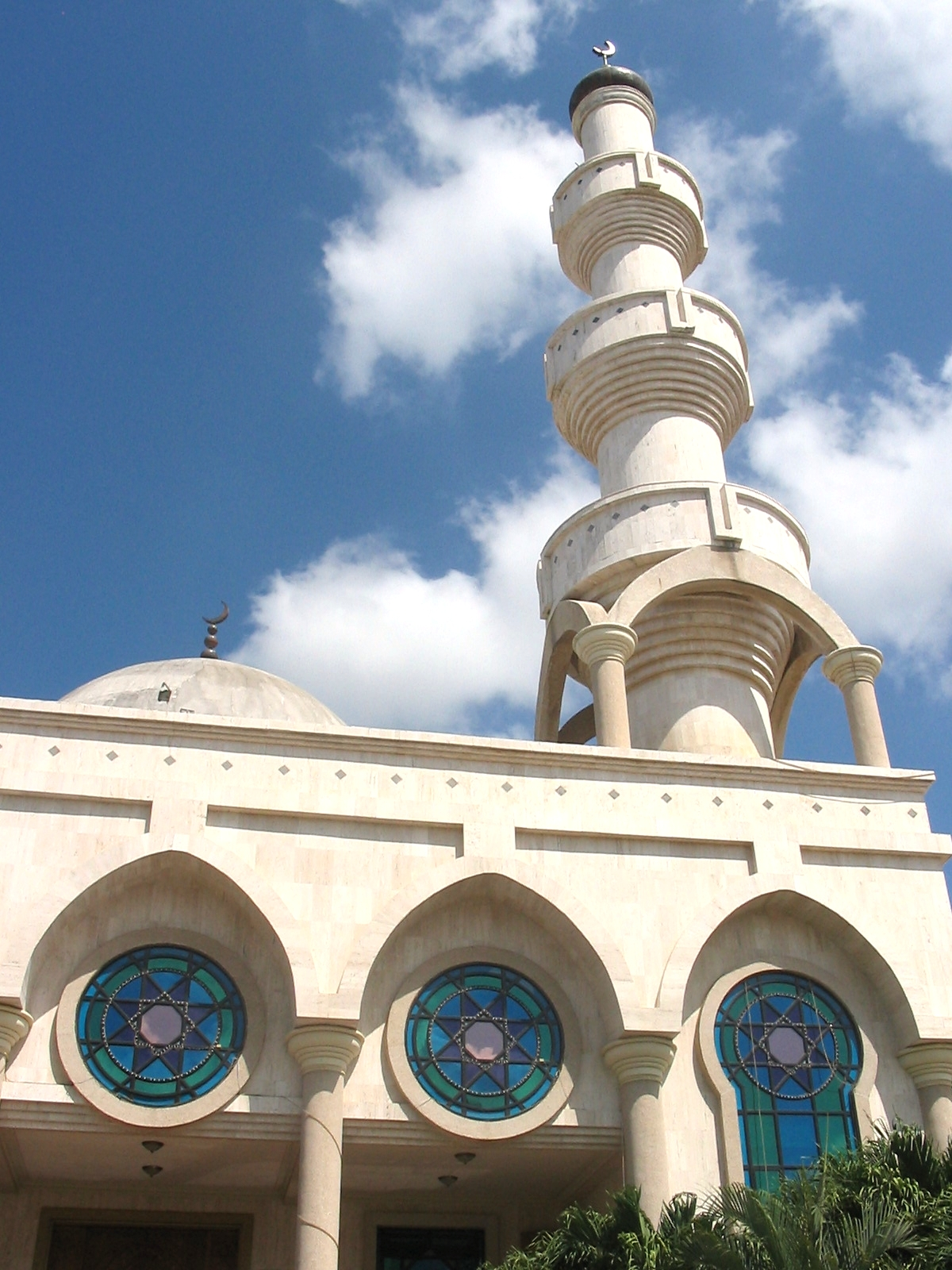
The Mosque of Omar Ibn Al-Khattab is the third largest mosque in Latin America

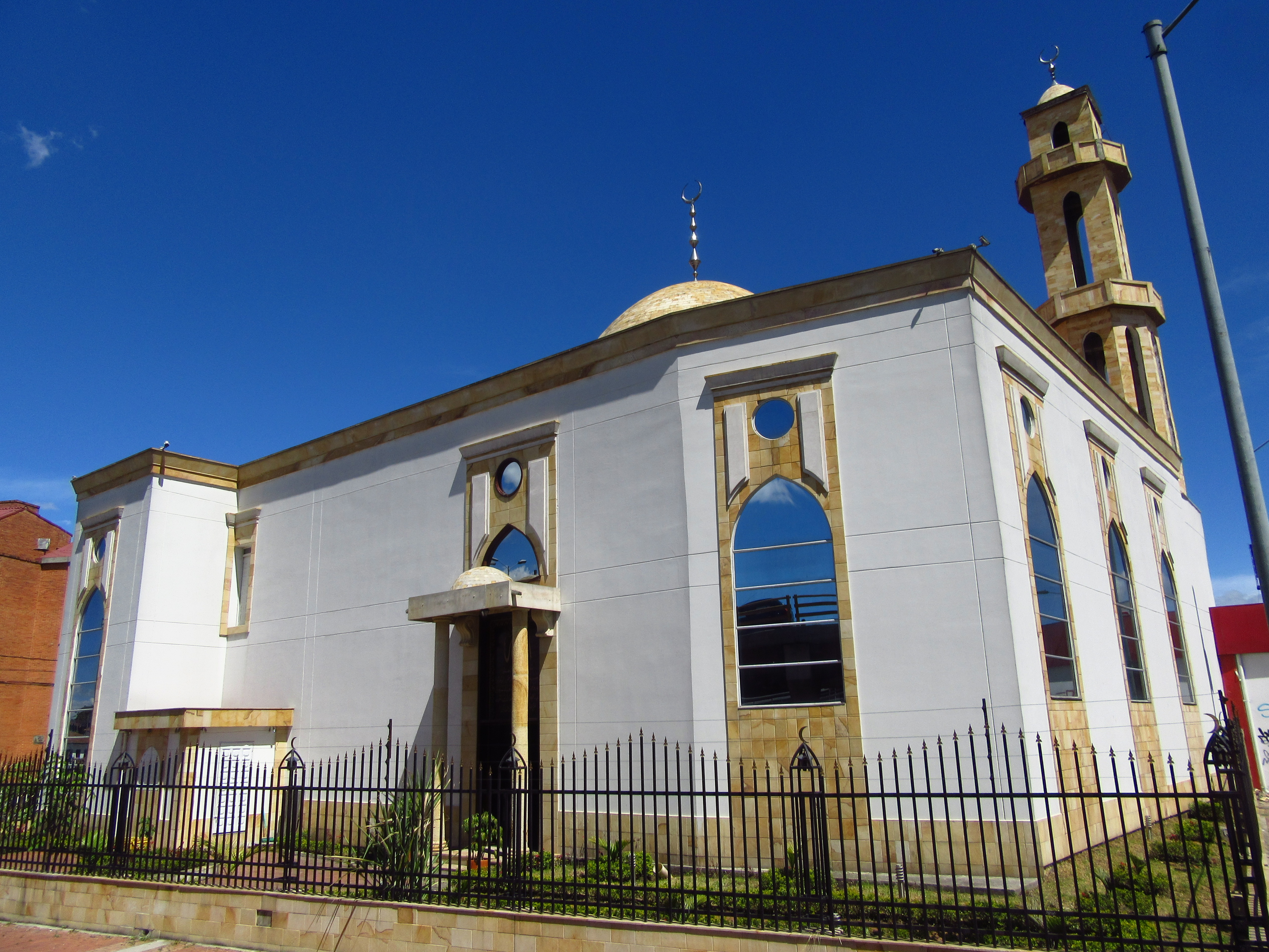
The Mosque of Abou Bakr Alsiddq in Bogotá.

According to a 2018 study conducted Pew Research Center, the size of the Colombian Muslim population ranges from about 85,000-100,000 individuals. There are a number of Islamic organizations in Colombia, including Islamic in San Andrés, Barranquilla, Bogotá, Guajira, Nariño, and Santa Marta. There are also primary and secondary Islamic schools in Bogotá and Maicao. Maicao plays host to the continent's third largest mosque, the Mosque of Omar Ibn Al-Khattab.

Most Colombian Muslims are converts or of Arab descent.

In 2020, Maicao became the first place in Colombia to elect a Muslim mayor; the Omar Ibn Al-Khattab Mosque in the city is the third largest in Latin America.

According to FBI, Maicao is the focal point of Islamic terrorist group Hezbollah in South America.

== Other religious affiliations ==
Various denominations have their own statistics:

- Seventh-day Adventist Church: 270,256 members as of June 30, 2017
- The Church of Jesus Christ of Latter-day Saints: 193,350 members (2016)
- Jehovah's Witnesses: about 188,219 members (2022)
- Judaism: 5,500 members
- Buddhism: approximately 9,000

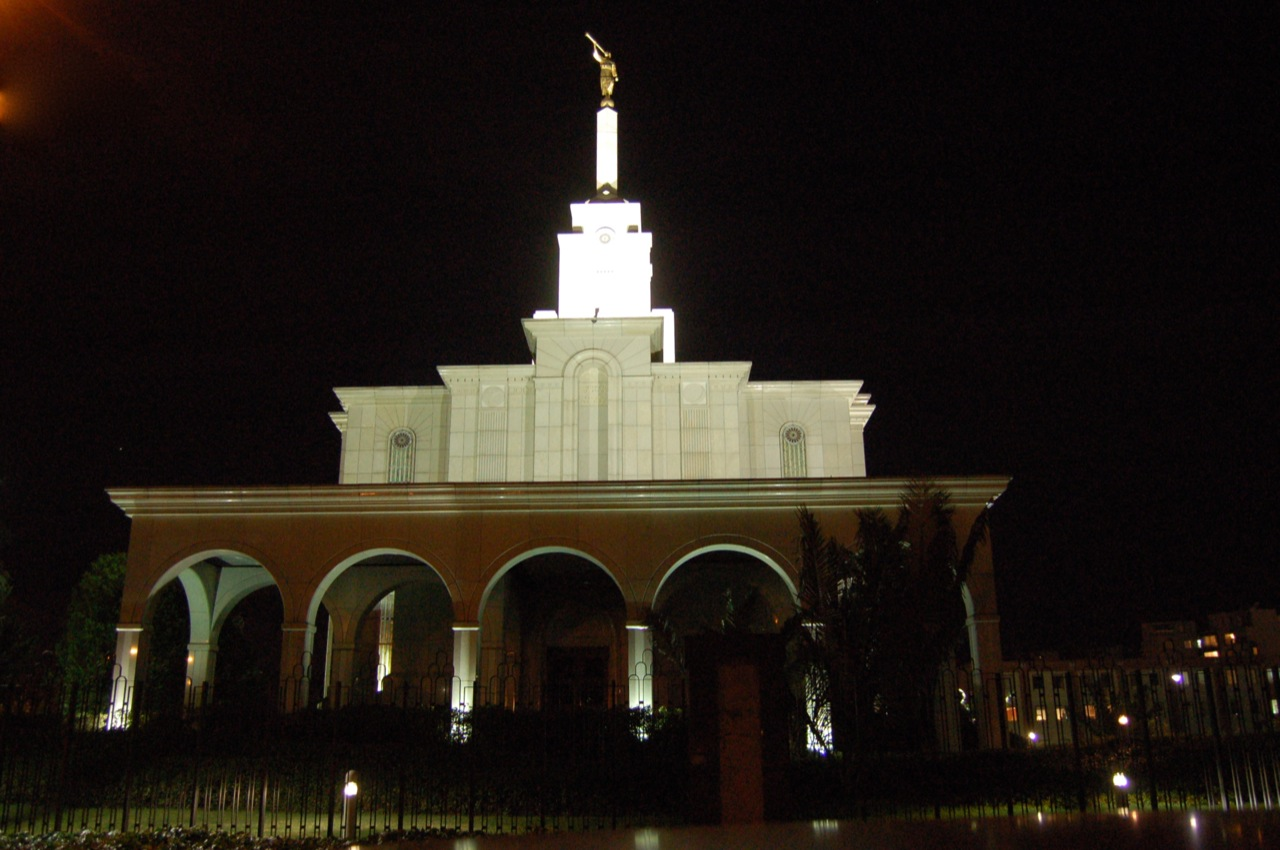
Bogotá Latter-Day Saints Temple

Although the government does not keep official statistics on religious affiliation, a 2010 limited survey found

- 70.0% Catholic
- 0.9% Charismatic Catholic
- 14.4% Evangelical Christian
- 1.6% Pentecostal
- 0.3% Charismatic Evangelicals
- 0.4% Protestant
- 2.5% Agnostic
- 2.2% Atheist
- 3.5% Theistic but no religion (Mostly Indigenous religions)
- 1.3% Jehovah's Witnesses
- 0.5% Adventist
- 0.1% Muslim
- 2.2% no response

The constitution provides for freedom of religion and prohibits discrimination based on religion; there is no official state religion, but the law says the state is not atheist or agnostic. All cities and towns in Colombia have a church, but there are also some temples, mosques and synagogues in the largest cities.

A Colombian-grown Tao (not to be confused with Taoísm) sect has spread significantly in recent years. In the 2000s, temples and congregations were target of a paramilitary repression whose motivations are still unclear. Entire Tao-Judío communities were massacred and leaders kidnapped. The leader of the Tao sect, Luis Morales Sierra, also known Kelium Zeus, along with other seven members, were also charged for kidnapping, homicide and criminal conspiracy. In 2008 these communities organised and participated to various peaceful protests in some cities of Colombia.

== Syncretism in Colombia ==
Some syncretic or native religious figures in the country are: The healing ghost of José Gregorio Hernández, the Purgatory souls (Animas del Purgatorio), the Lonely Soul (Anima Sola), the Powerful hand, the Black Christ of Buga, Valle del Cauca, 20 July Baby Jesus (Divine Infant Jesus), Father Marianito (beatified Mariano de Jesus Euse Hoyos 1845–1926), the fertility rites of St Isidro and local variations of syncretism from other countries, such as Santería and Maria Lionza cult.

== Religious statistics ==
The National Administrative Department of Statistics (DANE) infrequently collects religious statistics, and accurate reports are difficult to obtain. However, based on various studies and a survey, about 90% of the population adheres to Christianity, the majority of which (70.9%) are Roman Catholic, while a significant minority (16.7%) adhere to Protestantism (primarily Evangelicalism). Some 4.7% of the population is atheist or agnostic, while 3.5% claim to believe in God but do not follow a specific religion. 1.8% of Colombians adhere to Jehovah's Witnesses and Adventism and less than 1% adhere to other religions, such as Islam, Judaism, Buddhism, Mormonism, Hinduism, Hare Krishna movement, Rastafari movement, Eastern Orthodox Church, and spiritual studies. The remaining people either did not respond or replied that they did not know. In addition to the above statistics, 35.9% of Colombians reported that they did not practice their faith actively. 1,519,562 people in Colombia, or around 3% of the population reported following an Indigenous religion.

The Latinobarometro 2024 estimated that Catholics comprised 57% of the population, other Christians made up 18% and 20% had no religion.

While Colombia remains a mostly Roman Catholic country by baptism numbers, the 1991 Colombian constitution guarantees freedom of religion and all religious faiths and churches are equally free before the law.

== Gallery ==
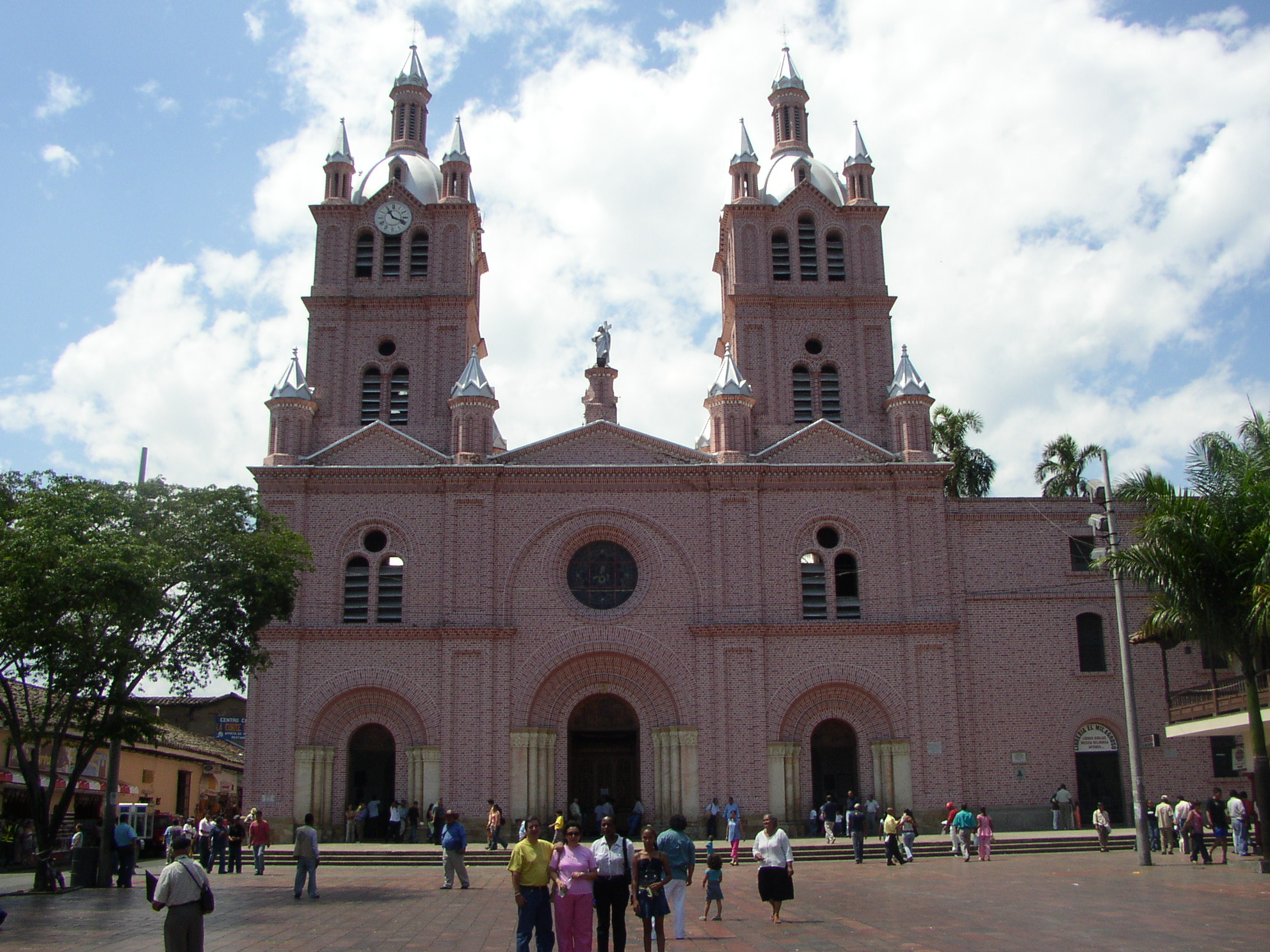
The Black Christ Icon in the Basilica of Señor de los Milagros (Buga, Valle del Cauca) is visited by thousands of people every week

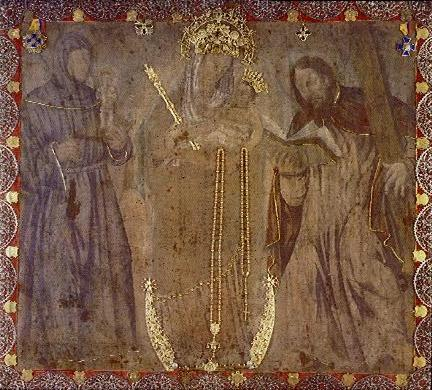
Our Lady of the Rosary of Chiquinquirá (16th century). Virgin de Chiquinquirá is the patroness saint of Colombia. Chiquinquirá is a major point of religious pilgrimage

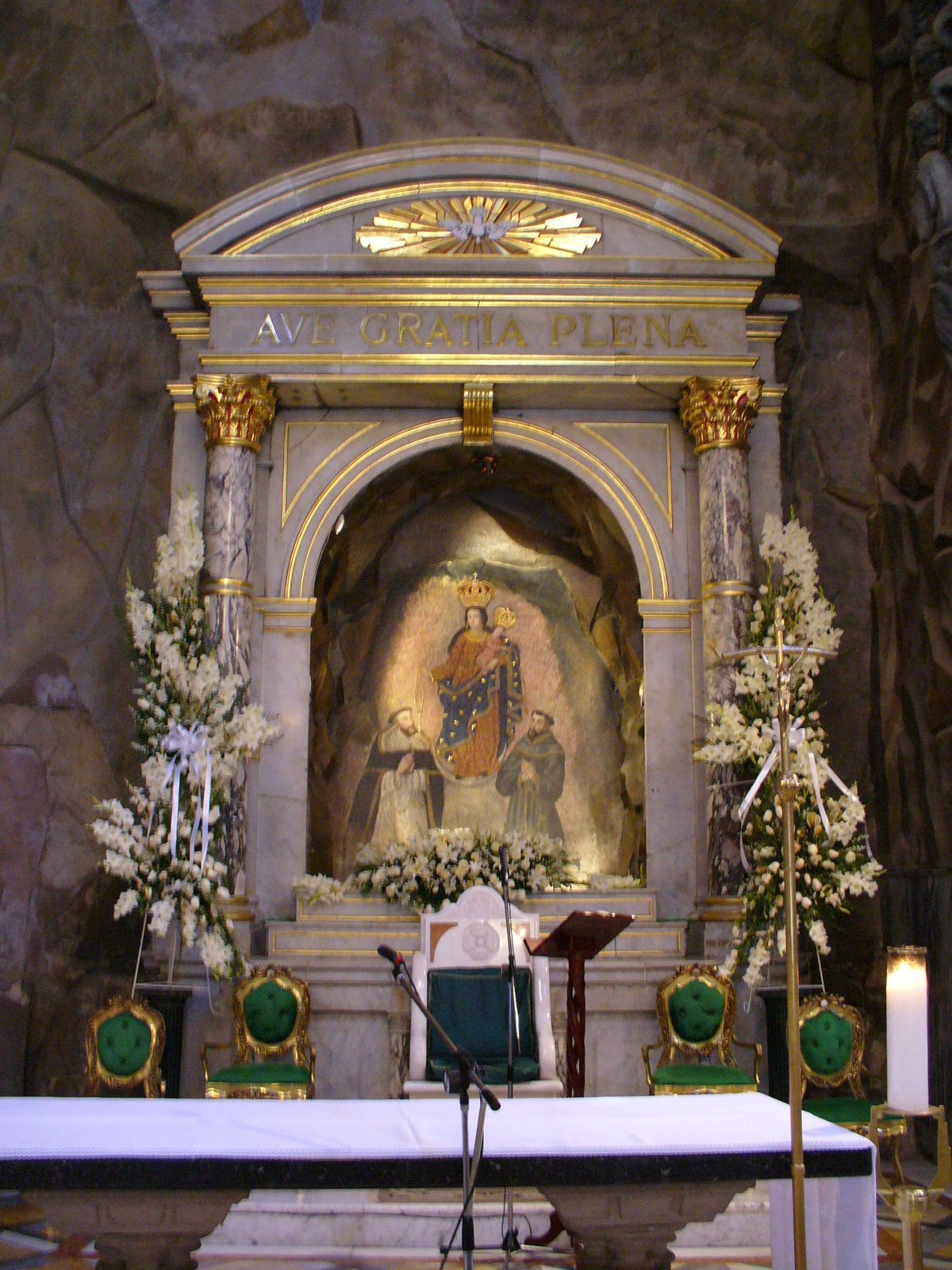
Virgin of Rosary in las Lajas Cathedral

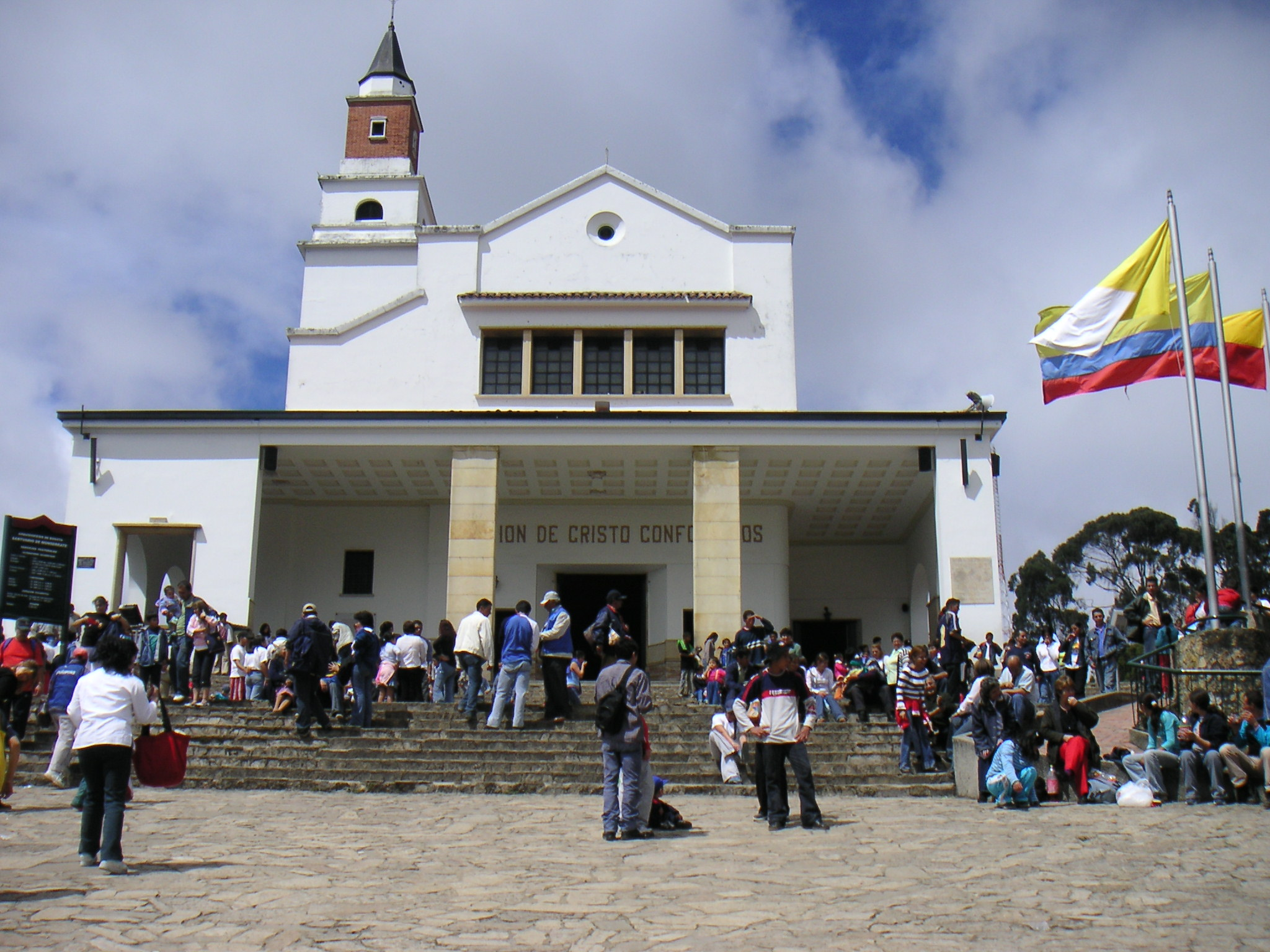
Pilgrims visit Monserrate and the "Saint Christ Fallen by the whips and nailed into the Cross" Icon in Bogotá

== See also ==
- Pentecostalism in Colombia
- History of the Jews in Colombia
