= Rock Church (Auburn, Wyoming) =

Historic church in Wyoming, United States

- U.S. National Register of Historic Places
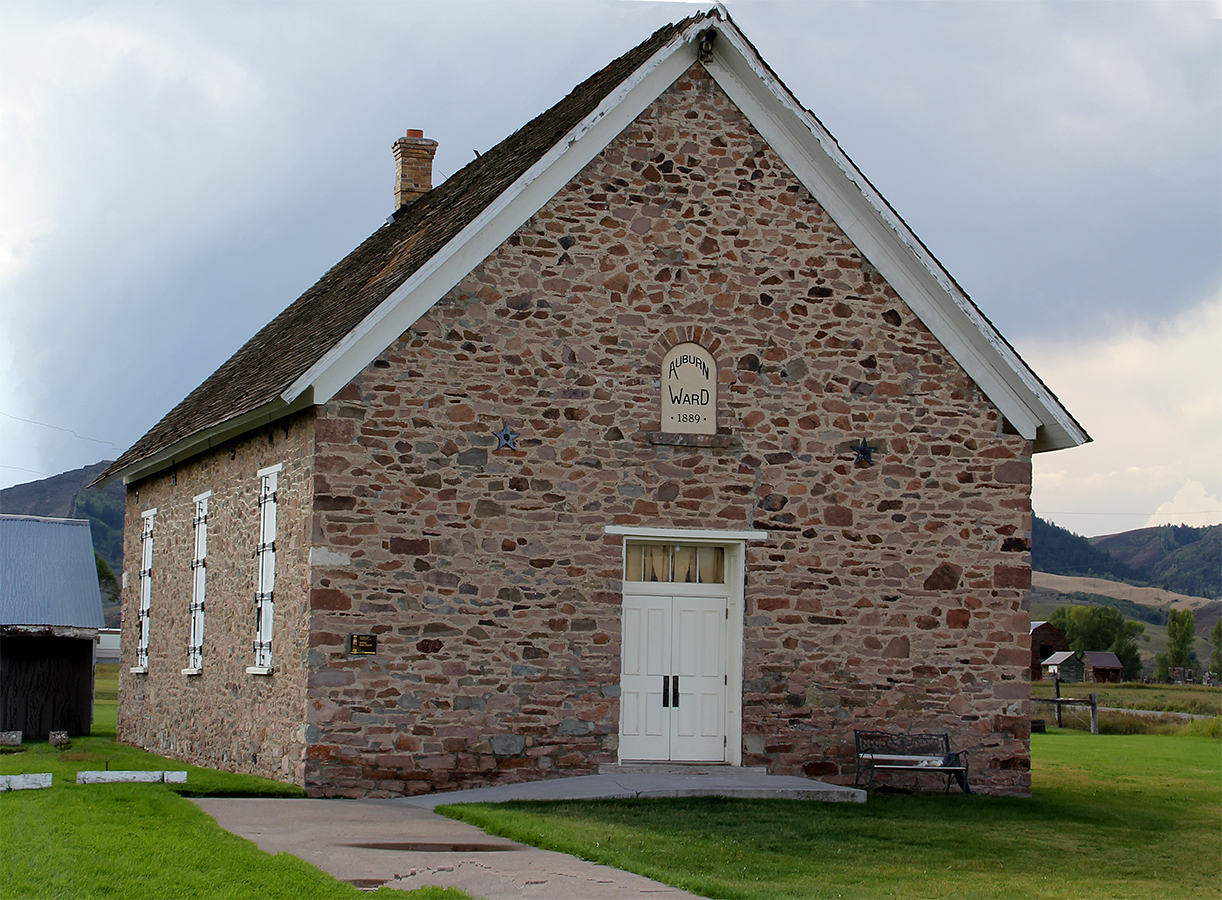

- Location within Wyoming Location within the United States
- Location: Second W and First S Sts., Auburn, Wyoming
- Coordinates: 42°47′30″N 111°0′4″W
- Area: less than one acre
- Built: 1889
- NRHP reference No.: 85003222
- Added to NRHP: December 13, 1985

The Rock Church of Auburn, Wyoming is a historic church building that has served also as a community center. Also known as Latter Day Saints Auburn Ward Meeting House, it is located in the public square at Second W and First S Sts. in Auburn. It was built in 1889 out of rough cut stone, rarely used in early Star Valley architecture. It is a steeply gabled structure, of size approximately 30 by 15 feet (9.1 m × 4.6 m). The church began construction in the summer, was hand-worked, and finished during the winter. The rectangular building stands unornamented beyond the texture of stone and an arch stating "Auburn Ward." Construction of the building costed $2,980.00 at the time and the community was considered the wealthiest in the valley for some years after construction.

It was listed on the National Register of Historic Places (NRHP) in 1985. At the time of its NRHP listing, it was significant as the only building from the 1800s still in regular use in the area, and as one of the very oldest buildings surviving in Star Valley. Its NRHP nomination asserted that it "embodies the type, period, and method of construction utilized by early pioneers for buildings of major importance." The Star Valley Historical Society intended to initiate restoration following its nomination.

== See also ==
- The Church of Jesus Christ of Latter-day Saints in Wyoming
- List of the oldest churches in the United States
- List of the oldest buildings in Wyoming
