= William R. Bradford =

American Mormon leader (1933–2019)

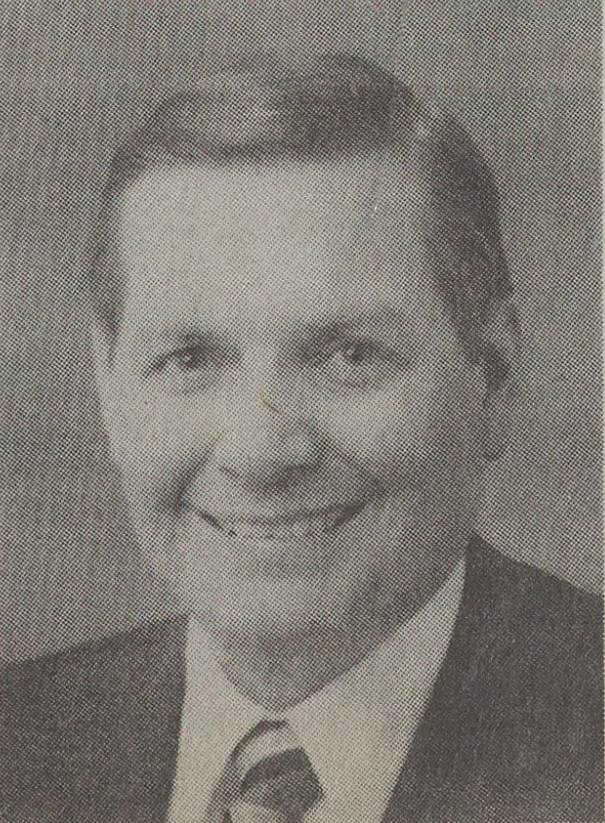
- Bradford during or before 1989.

First Quorum of the Seventy
- October 3, 1975 – October 4, 2003
- Called by: Spencer W. Kimball
- End reason: Granted general authority emeritus status

Emeritus General Authority
- October 4, 2003 – January 24, 2019
- Called by: Gordon B. Hinckley

Personal details
- Born: William Rawsel Bradford; October 25, 1933; Springville, Utah, United States
- Died: January 24, 2019 (aged 85); Bountiful, Utah, U.S.

William Rawsel Bradford (October 25, 1933 - January 24, 2019) was an American general authority of the Church of Jesus Christ of Latter-day Saints (LDS Church) from 1975 until his death.

Bradford was born in Springville, Utah, to Rawsel W. Bradford and Mary Waddoups. During the 1940s Bradford went to Hawaii as his parents served as missionaries in the Laie Hawaii Temple Visitors Center. He graduated from Springville High School and then began studies at Brigham Young University. From 1953 to 1955, Bradford was a missionary for the LDS Church in Japan. He then married Mary Ann Bird, a native of Mapleton, Utah, in the Salt Lake Temple.

Bradford then served in the United States military. After this he moved to McAllen, Texas, and began a fruit-growing operation called International Fruit Growers and Shippers, Inc. The company's operations extended into Mexico and Central America. Bradford was heavily involved in LDS Church outreach to Mexican Americans in the McAllen area. In the McAllen area, he served as branch president, a counselor in the district presidency, and as district mission president.

Bradford later served as a mission president in Santiago, Chile. Craig C. Christensen, who would also later become a general authority, was among the missionaries who served under his direction. In 1975, he became a general authority as a member of the First Quorum of the Seventy. He was a member of this quorum until 2003, when he was designated as an emeritus general authority.

Bradford and his wife are the parents of six children. Their daughter Marcia married Brent H. Nielson, who later became a general authority. From 2006 to 2009, Bradford served as president of the Houston Texas Temple.

Bradford died on January 24, 2019.
