= Helena Montana Temple =

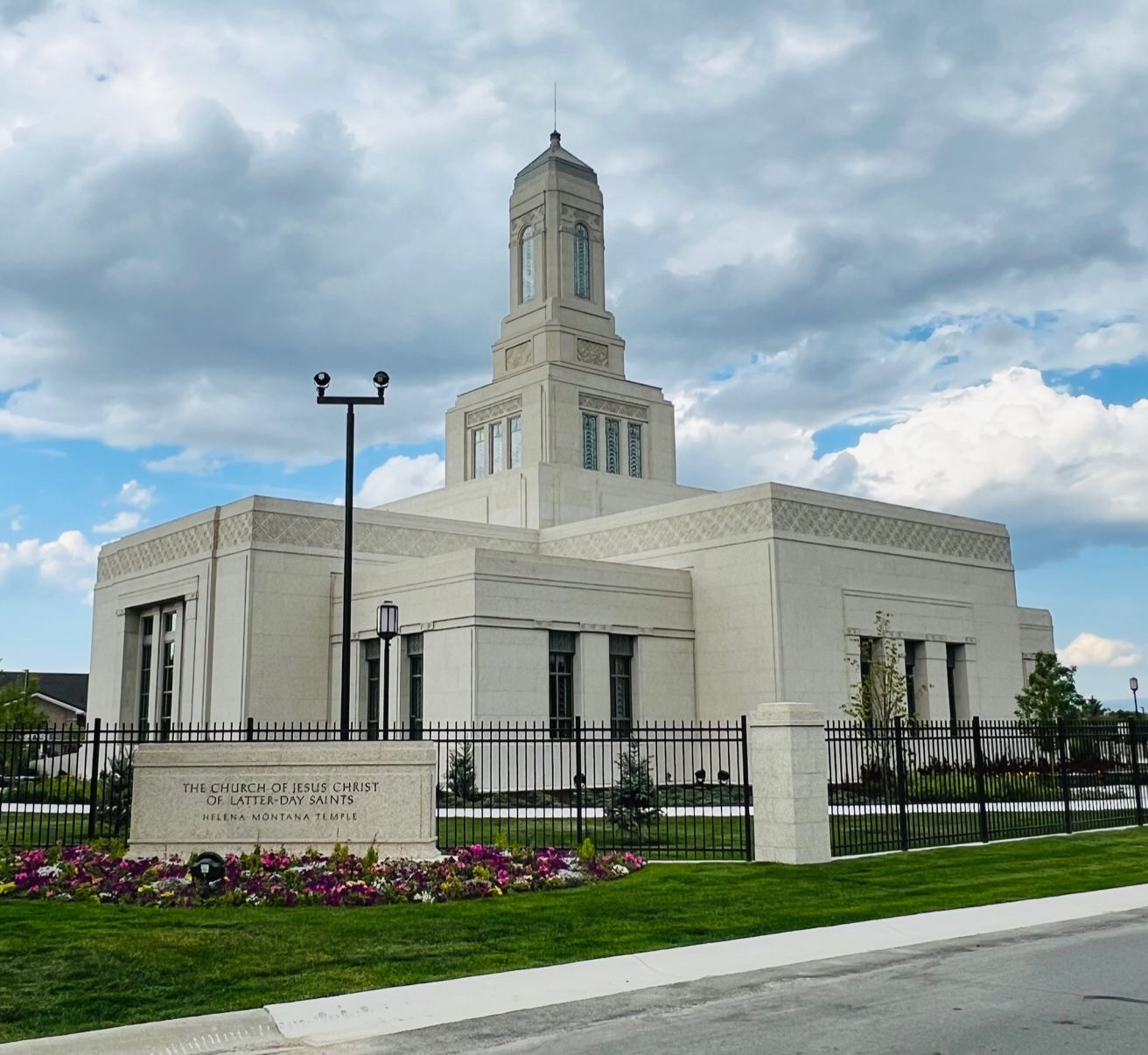
- Interactive map of Helena Montana Temple
- Number: 178
- Dedication: 18 June 2023, by Gary E. Stevenson
- Site: 4.75 acres (1.92 ha)
- Floor area: 9,794 ft^{2} (909.9 m^{2})
- Height: 96.75 ft (29.49 m)
- Official website • News & images

Church chronology
| ← Richmond Virginia Temple | Helena Montana Temple | → Saratoga Springs Utah Temple |

Additional information
- Announced: April 4, 2021, by Russell M. Nelson
- Groundbreaking: June 26, 2021, by Vern P. Stanfill
- Open house: 18 May-3 June 2023
- Current president: Lance C Brimhall
- Location: Helena, Montana, United States
- Coordinates: 46°38′01″N 112°01′09″W
- Baptistries: 1
- Ordinance rooms: 1
- Sealing rooms: 1

The Helena Montana Temple is the 179th temple of the Church of Jesus Christ of Latter-day Saints and is located in Helena, Montana, United States. The intent to build the temple was announced on April 4, 2021, by church president Russell M. Nelson, during general conference. It is the second to be built in Montana, after the Billings Montana Temple.

The temple's design is meant to complement the architectural traditions of the area, while accommodating the requirements of modular construction. A groundbreaking ceremony, to signify the beginning of construction, was held on June 26, 2021, conducted by Vern P. Stanfill, a church general authority.

== History ==
Plans to build a temple in Helena were announced on April 4, 2021, by church president Russell M. Nelson, along with 19 others the same day, the most new temples announced in a single day.

In June 2021, the church released the location and rendering for the planned temple, with a groundbreaking, to signify beginning of construction, announced for later in the month. The groundbreaking was held on June 26, 2021, with Vern P. Stanfill presiding.

To shorten temple construction time, the Helena Montana Temple is the church's first using modular construction techniques. The Alabama-based company, BLOX, which specializes in modular building for hospitals, built the temple in 25 separate modules in its facility in Bessemer, Alabama, which were then put taken to the construction site in Montana and assembled.

On February 6, 2023, the church announced the public open house that was held from May 18-June 3, 2023. Approximately 30,000 people toured the temple during the open house. The temple was dedicated in two sessions on June 18, 2023, by Gary E. Stevenson of the Quorum of the Twelve Apostles.

== Design and architecture ==
Designed by McNicholas Architects, the temple is built in an art deco style to reflect Montana's 19th-century architectural history and includes designs that draw upon the area's Native American artwork. The temple is on a 4.8-acre site, which it shares with a meetinghouse that was built alongside the temple.

=== Exterior and interior ===
The temple has a single attached central spire, and was constructed with art deco stone cladding. The decorative patterns are derived from the buttercup flower, with the flower and leaf designs utilized to draw upon principles of Native American geometric patterns. The temple includes buttressing and employs horizontal bands to mimic mountain cliff faces. The 9,794 square-foot building is 96 and-a-half feet tall.

The interior has the same buttercup motif as the exterior, centered around a color palette of blue, green, gold, cream, and other neutral colors, designed to mimic the natural landscape around the temple. The temple includes an instruction room, sealing room, and baptistry, each designed for ceremonial use.

=== Symbols ===
The design has symbolic elements representing the heritage of the region, to provide deeper spiritual meaning to its appearance and function. Symbolism is important to church members and includes the exterior windows that are split into three parts representing the root of the buttercup plant, its potential, and its full flower, with a blue border to represent Native American beadwork.

== Temple presidents ==
The church's temples are directed by a temple president and matron, each serving for a term of three years. The president and matron oversee the administration of temple operations and provide guidance and training for both temple patrons and staff. Since its 2024 dedication, David S. Heap and Mary W. Heap are the temple president and matron

== Admittance ==
On February 6, 2023, the church announced the public open house that was held from May 18-June 3, 2023 (excluding Sundays). The temple was dedicated by Gary E. Stevenson on June 18, 2023.

Like all the church's temples, it is not used for Sunday worship services. To members of the church, temples are regarded as sacred houses of the Lord. Once dedicated, only church members with a current temple recommend can enter for worship.

== See also ==

Temples in Montana

- = Operating
- = Under construction
- = Announced
- = Temporarily Closed

- The Church of Jesus Christ of Latter-day Saints in Montana
- Comparison of temples (LDS Church)
- List of temples (LDS Church)
- List of temples by geographic region (LDS Church)
- Temple architecture (LDS Church)
