= The Church of Jesus Christ of Latter-day Saints in Puerto Rico =

- Area: Caribbean
- Members: 26,947 (2025)
- Stakes: 5
- Districts: 1
- Wards: 27
- Branches: 11
- Total Congregations: 38
- Missions: 1
- Temples: 1 operating
- FamilySearch Centers: 13

The Church of Jesus Christ of Latter-day Saints in Puerto Rico refers to the Church of Jesus Christ of Latter-day Saints (LDS Church) and its members in Puerto Rico. The first branch (small congregation) was formed in 1950. As of December 31, 2025, there were 26,947 members in 38 congregations in Puerto Rico.

== History ==
Membership In Puerto Rico
| Year | Membership |
|---|---|
| 1975 | 832 |
| 1980 | 1,546 |
| 1989* | 16,000 |
| 1999 | 23,223 |
| 2009 | 20,386 |
| 2019 | 23,395 |
| 2025 | 26,947 |
1989 membership was published as a rounded number. Source: Jim M. Wall, Deseret News, various years, Church Almanac Country Information: Puerto Rico, Windall J. Ashton

== Stakes ==
As of May 2025, Puerto Rico had the following stakes:

| Stake | Organized |
|---|---|
| Caguas Puerto Rico | 26 Feb 2006 |
| Mayagüez Puerto Rico | 1 Dec 1985 |
| Ponce Puerto Rico | 13 Jun 1982 |
| San Juan Puerto Rico | 14 Dec 1980 |
| Toa Baja Puerto Rico | 7 Jun 1998 |

== Missions ==
Current Mission

- Puerto Rico San Juan Mission

When LDS Church missionaries first arrived in Puerto Rico in 1963, the island was part of the Florida Ft Lauderdale Mission. On July 7, 1979, the Puerto Rico San Juan Mission was organized.

=== Lesser Antilles North District ===
The Puerto Rico San Juan Mission currently covers all stakes in Puerto Rico as well as the Lesser Antilles North District which was Created January 24, 2021. This district includes the following six branches: the Portsmouth, St Croix, St John's, St Kitts, St Thomas, and Tortola Branches. The district covers the nations and territories of Antigua and Barbuda, the British Virgin Islands, Dominica, Montserrat, St Kitts and Nevis, and the United States Virgin Islands.

| Country/Territory | Members | Congregations | FHC |
|---|---|---|---|
| Antigua and Barbuda | 366 | 1 | 1 |
| British Virgin Islands (Note: 2018 membership and congregational information shown. Branch still exist as of May 2025.) | 138 | 1 | 0 |
| Dominica | 180 | 1 | 0 |
| Puerto Rico | 26,947 | 38 | 13 |
| Saint Kitts and Nevis | 292 | 1 | 1 |
| United States Virgin Islands | 704 | 2 | 0 |

== Temples ==
Groundbreaking for the San Juan Puerto Rico Temple was on May 4, 2019, by Walter F. González.

| 176. San Juan Puerto Rico Temple; Official website; News & images | |
| Location: Announced: Groundbreaking: Dedicated: Size: | San Juan, Puerto Rico; 7 October 2018 by Russell M. Nelson; 4 May 2019 by Walter F. González; 15 January 2023 by D. Todd Christofferson; 6,988 sq ft (649.2 m^{2}) on a 2.97-acre (1.20 ha) site |

== See also ==
- Religion in Puerto Rico
