= Red Cliffs Utah Temple =

LDS Church temple in St. George, Utah, US

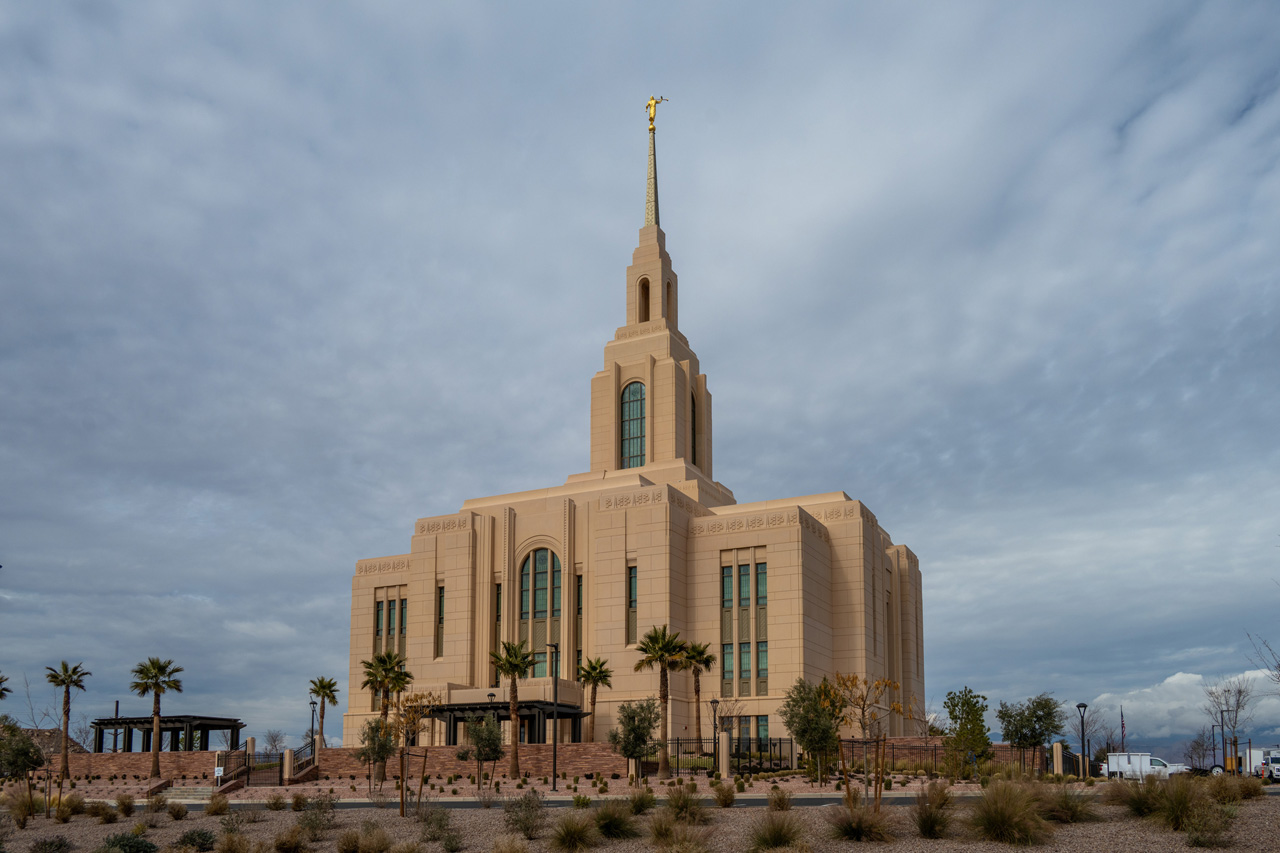
- Interactive map of Red Cliffs Utah Temple
- Number: 189
- Dedication: 24 March 2024, by Henry B. Eyring
- Site: 15.31 acres (6.20 ha)
- Floor area: 96,277 ft^{2} (8,944.4 m^{2})
- Height: 230 ft (70 m)
- Official website • News & images

Church chronology
← Orem Utah Temple	Red Cliffs Utah Temple	→ Urdaneta Philippines Temple

Additional information
- Announced: 7 October 2018, by Russell M. Nelson
- Groundbreaking: 7 November 2020, by Jeffrey R. Holland
- Open house: 30 January-2 March 2024
- Location: St. George, Utah, United States
- Coordinates: 37.0823°N 113.5196°W
- Baptistries: 1
- Ordinance rooms: 4
- Sealing rooms: 6
- Clothing rental: Yes
- Visitors' center: No

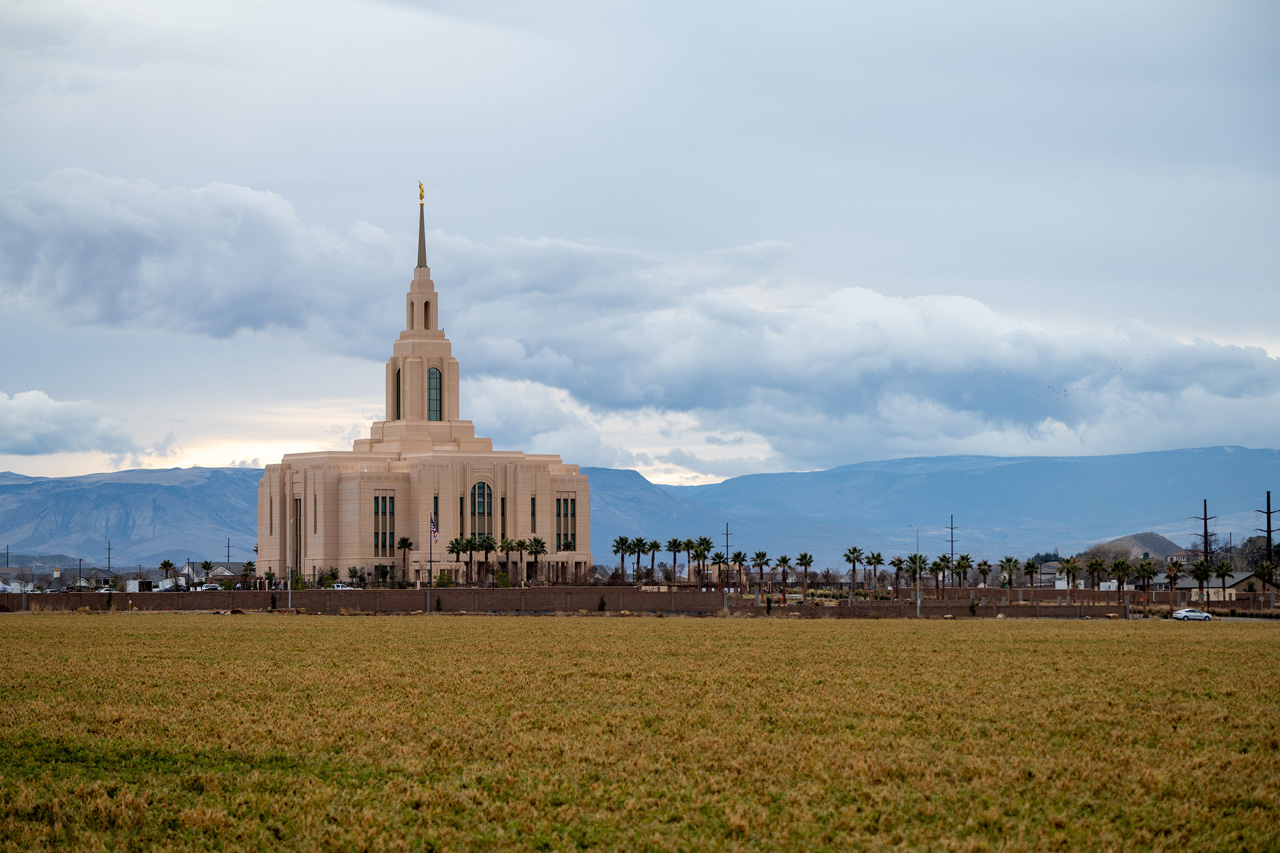
Red Cliffs Utah Temple at a distance

The Red Cliffs Utah Temple, originally announced as the Washington County Utah Temple, is a temple of the Church of Jesus Christ of Latter-day Saints in St. George, Utah. The intent to construct the temple was announced in October 2018 by church president Russell M. Nelson. It is the second temple in Washington County, with the St. George Utah Temple being the first. It is the fourth in southern Utah.

The temple is approximately 96,000 square feet and has three stories. The construction is a significant development in a region where church members form a substantial part of the population. Temples differ from regular meetinghouses and church members consider them sacred where ordinances like marriages and proxy baptisms are performed. After construction was completed, a public open house was held from February 1 to March 2, 2024, with the dedication, led by Henry B. Eyring, of the church's First Presidency, on 24 March 2024.

== History ==
The intent to build the temple was announced by Nelson on October 7, 2018, during the church's general conference. The temple was originally announced as the Washington County Utah Temple. The location for the temple was announced in November 2019. A groundbreaking ceremony took place on November 7, 2020, with Jeffrey R. Holland, a native of St. George, and a member of the Quorum of the Twelve Apostles presiding. Attendance was limited to 70 people due to the COVID-19 pandemic. The groundbreaking was two days before the 149th anniversary of the St. George Temple's groundbreaking, and was held the same day as the Bentonville Arkansas Temple's groundbreaking.

Located on a 14-acre site at the northeast corner of 3000 East and 1580 South, the temple is the second in St. George and the 20th completed in Utah. The sunken and swampy land was the last area to be settled by pioneers. The site was originally the location of a family farm through the 1800s and most of the 1900s. The site is in the Washington Fields area of St. George, and originally had the name "Charmin' Acres." The family sold the land to the church in the 1960s with the original intent that it would remain farmland. The land now contains three stake centers, a chapel, and the temple.

In May 2022, a statue of the angel Moroni, a feature of many Latter-day Saint temples, was installed. Initially announced as the Washington County Utah Temple, it was renamed the Red Cliffs Utah Temple on June 19, 2020. The name came from Holland and his wife, Patricia T. Holland, who had been asked by the First Presidency for suggestions. The idea for the name came after driving past the red cliffs of Petticoat Mountain. Holland stated that his wife "looked toward Pine Valley and said, ‘Well, there are sure a lot of red cliffs around here.’ We thought that had kind of a ring to it.” The suggestion was submitted to the First Presidency, who approved the temple's name.

The temple represents an expansion of the church's presence and membership growth in the region, and a continuation of its historical and cultural legacy in St. George. Craig C. Christensen, while serving as president of the church's Utah Area, said that the growth in the area has been "magnificent," and that "when the St. George temple was open and working, people couldn't get in," which justified this (and possibly other) temples. In the dedicatory prayer offered at the groundbreaking, Holland noted the Red Cliffs Temple was "a sister temple [to the St. George Temple] to serve the growth in this region".

== Architecture ==
=== Site ===
A rendering of the temple was released in April 2020, with a plan to make interior renderings public at a later date. The temple has an area of about 96,277 square feet (8,944.4 m^{2}), and is on a site of 15.12 acres. The temple was built on a sunken field in a swamp, amid sandstone buttes and mesas. Due to a high water table, the foundation used would be unable to support the temple, so workers moved more than 30,000 cubic yards of red dirt from the foundation of the St. George Temple to stabilize the foundation of the Red Cliffs Temple. Garden elements on site include palm trees, along with green, yellow, and purple bushes. Waterfalls and three reflecting pools are on the temple's north side.

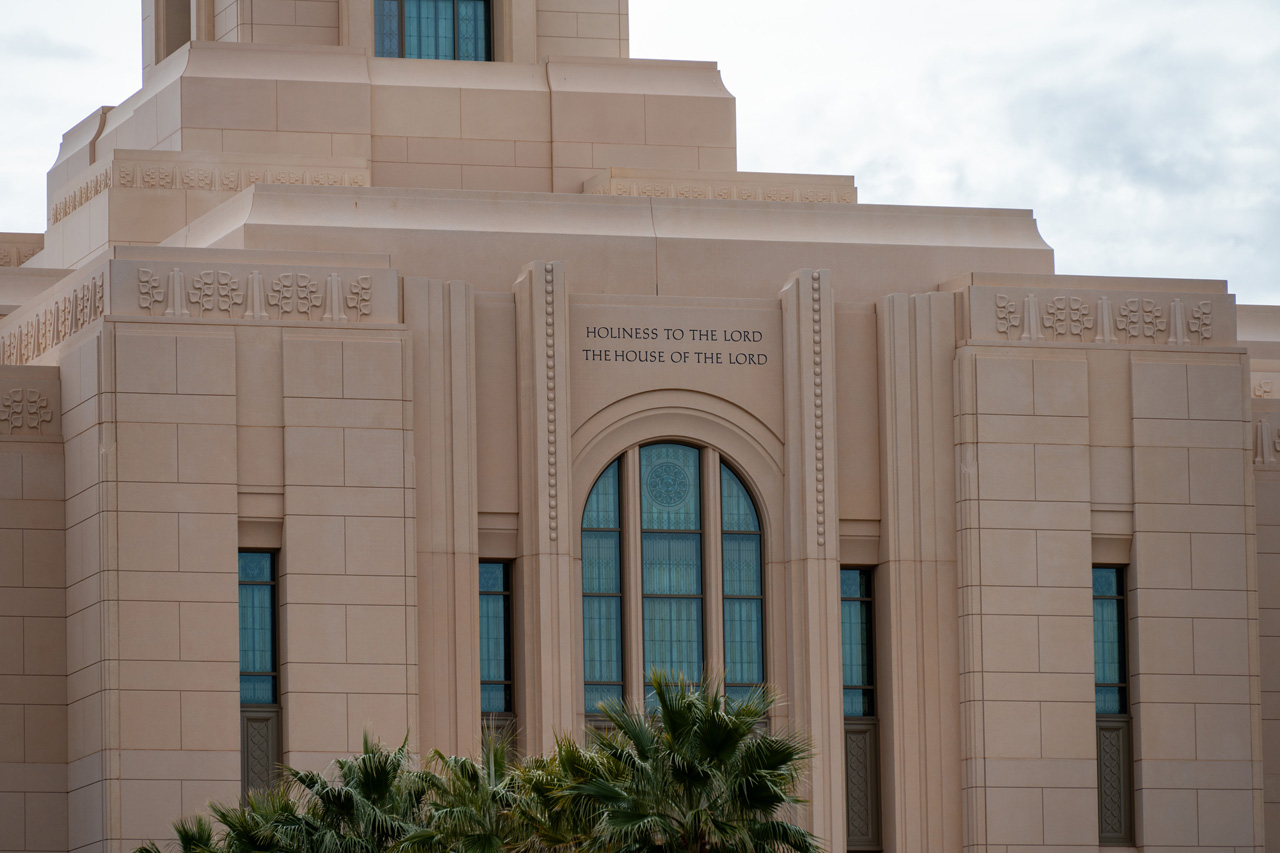
Closeup of the Red Cliffs Utah Temple

=== Exterior ===
The temple is a three-story building, and has many rectangular windows on the front, along with a large arched window in the middle. A multi-tiered spire tops the building and includes a statue of the angel Moroni, along with windows that are rounded on the upper portion. Outside motifs of the temple represent grand cottonwood trees and other geological features of the area, like canyons and mountains.

=== Interior ===
The building has one baptistry, which is used for baptisms for the dead. The temple has four ordinance rooms, used for the endowment ceremony, and six sealing rooms. The temple's architecture serves functional and ceremonial purposes, while also being a symbol of faith for church members in the region. Visual themes inside the building feature local plants like dwarf bearclaw poppy (an endangered species), leaves from the cottonwood tree, succulents, pomegranates, and indian paintbrush.

== Admittance ==
On 16 October 2023, the church announced that a public open house would be held from February 1 to March 2, 2024 (excluding Sundays). The temple was dedicated by Henry B. Eyring on 24 March 2024. Like all the church's temples, it is not used for Sunday worship services. To members of the church, temples are regarded as sacred houses of the Lord. Only church members with a current temple recommend can enter for worship.

== Gallery ==
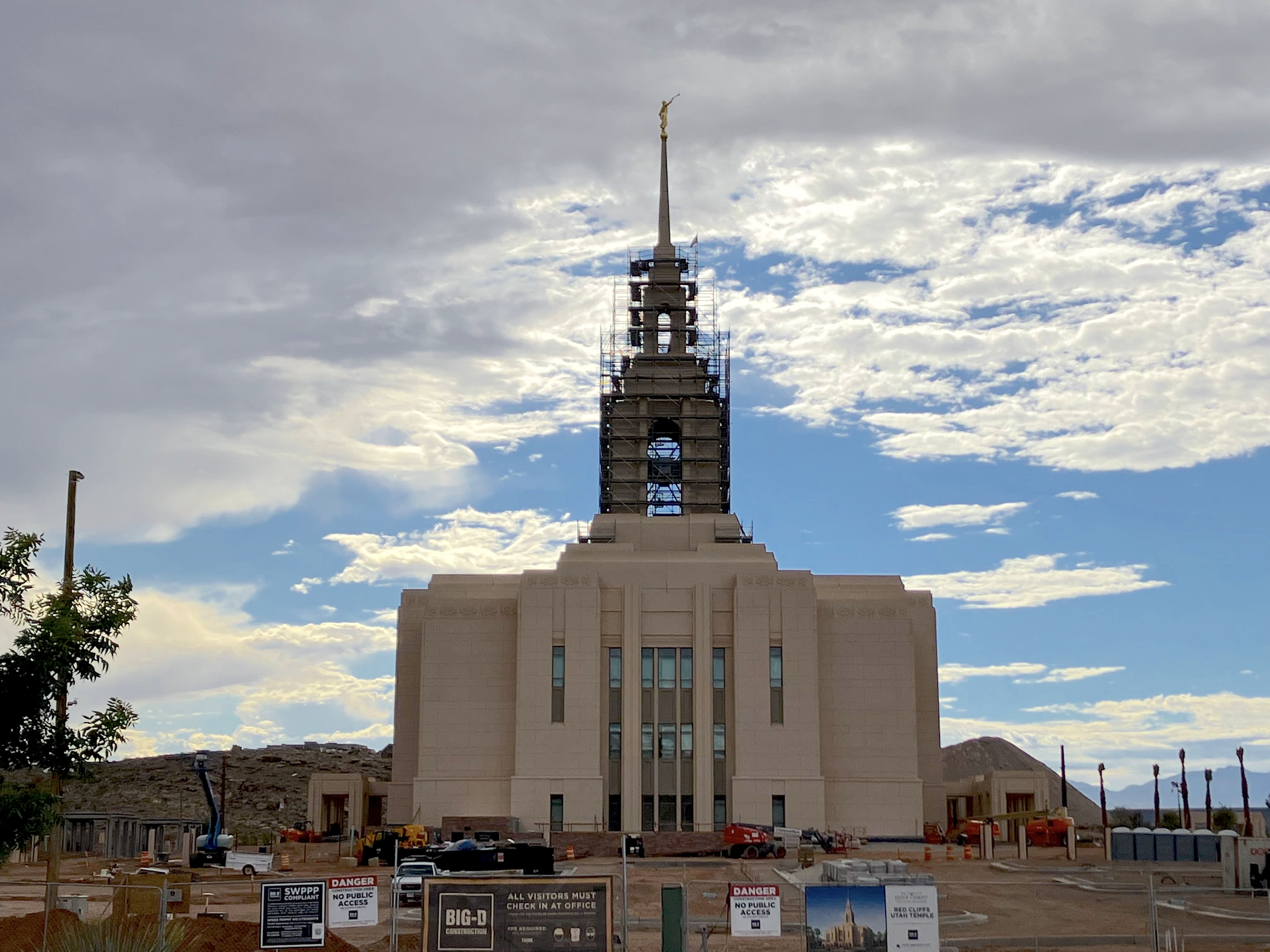
The temple under construction

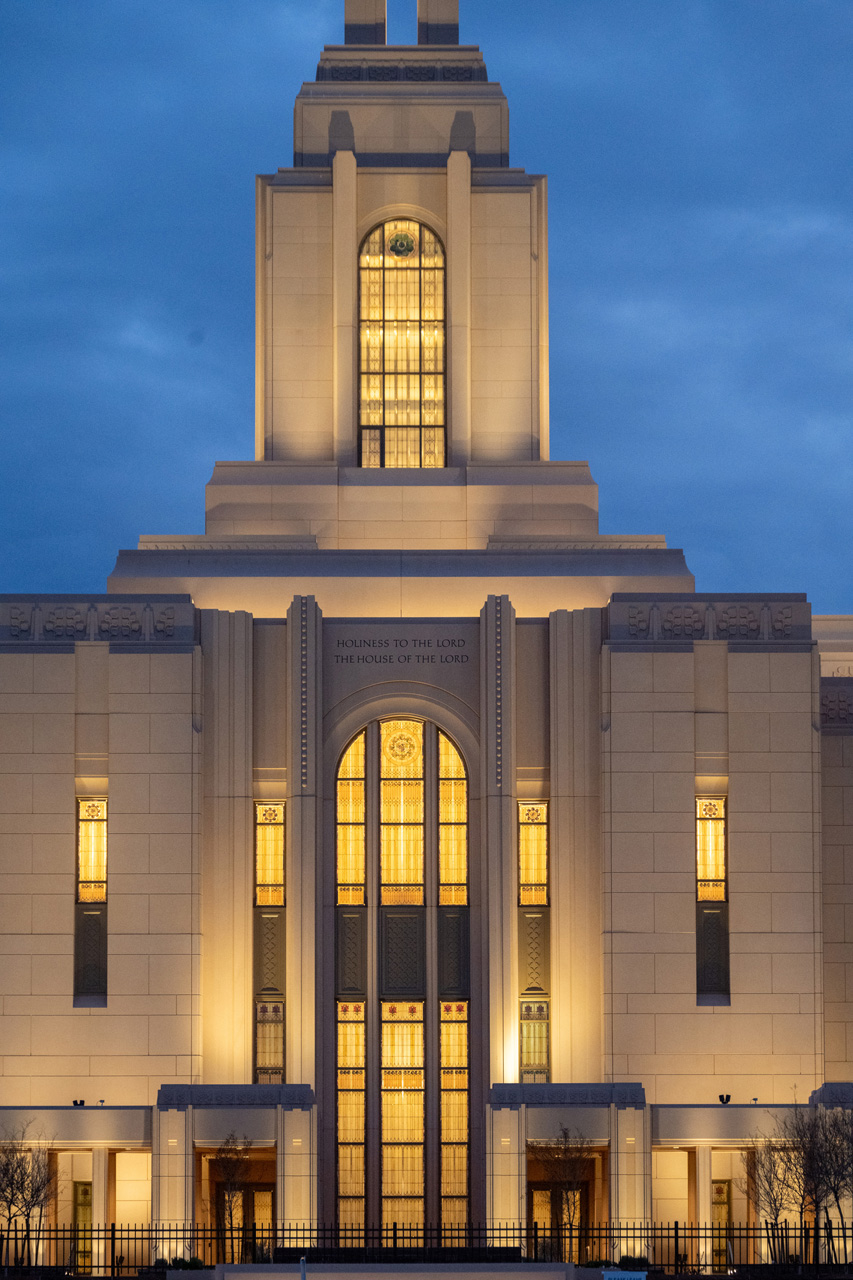
The temple at night

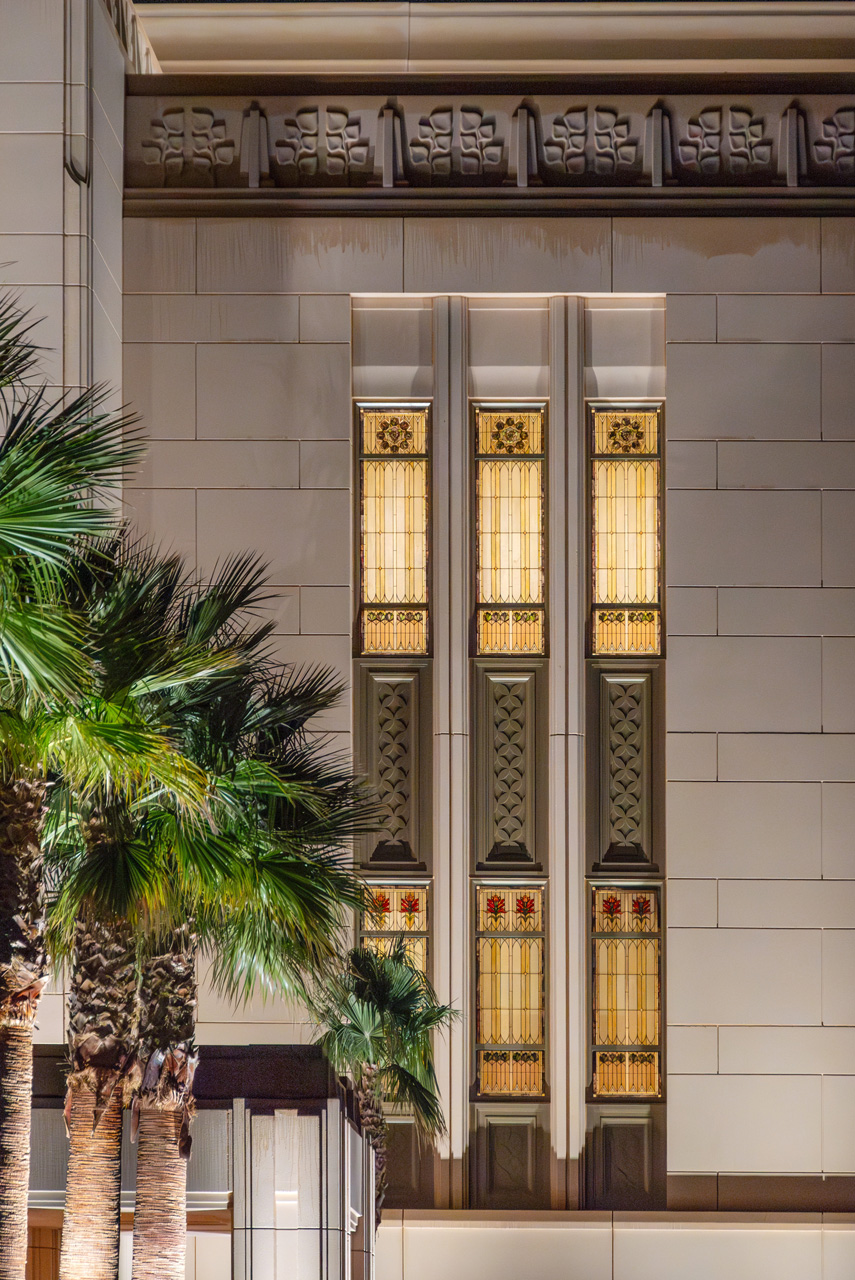
Art glass of the temple

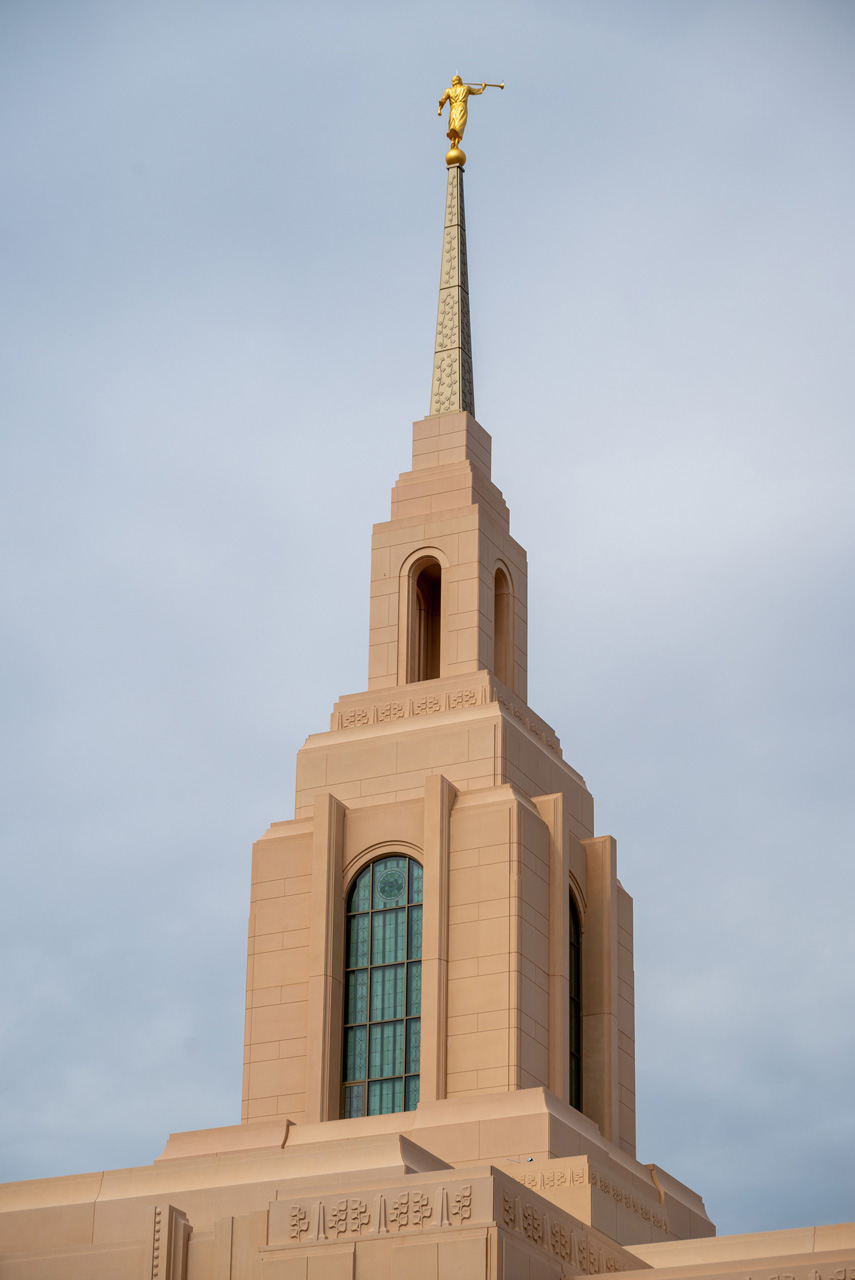
Spire of the temple

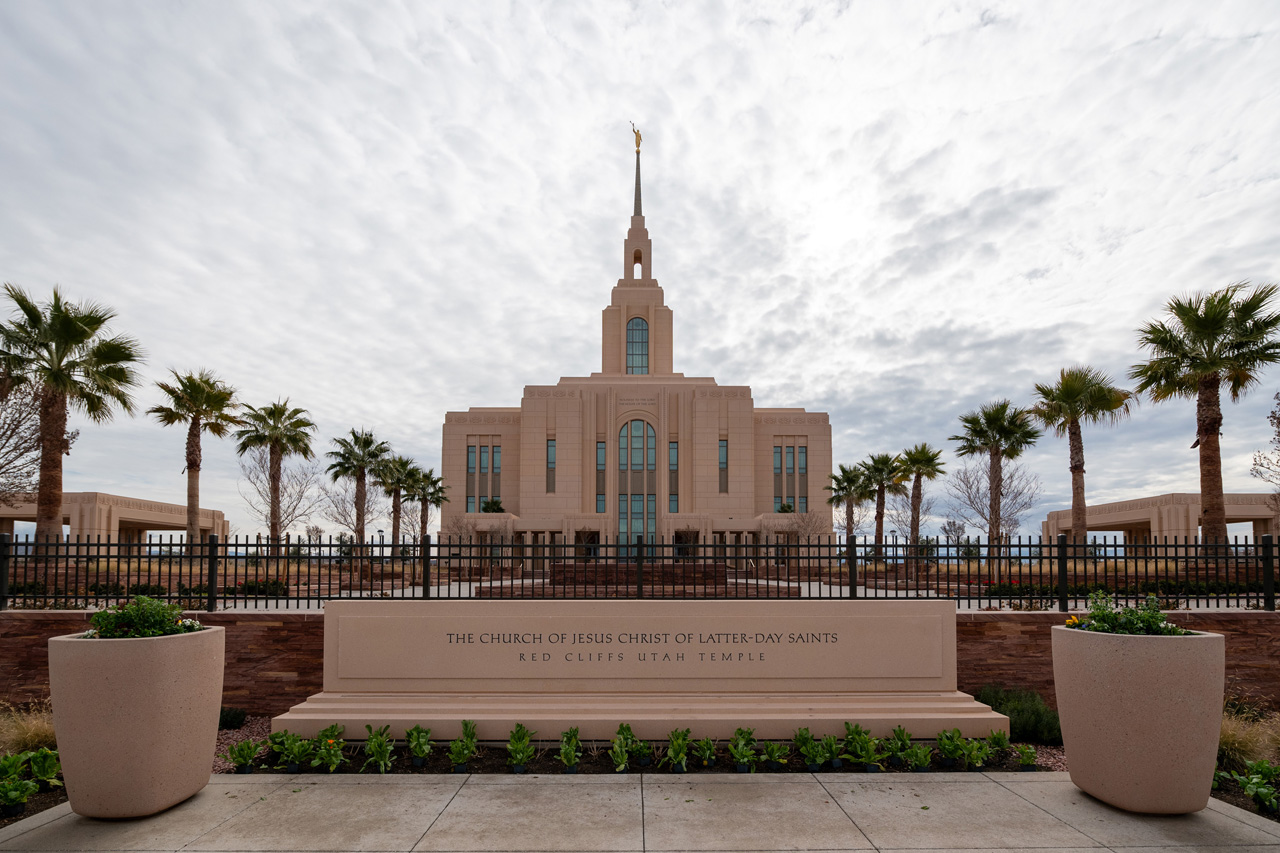
The temple from a distance

== See also ==
Temples in Utah
Wasatch Front Temples
Temples along the Wasatch Front
- = Operating
- = Under construction
- = Announced
- = Temporarily Closed

- The Church of Jesus Christ of Latter-day Saints in Utah
- Comparison of temples (LDS Church)
- List of temples (LDS Church)
- List of temples by geographic region (LDS Church)
- Temple architecture (LDS Church)
