= San Juan Puerto Rico Temple =

Temple of The Church of Jesus Christ of Latter-day Saints in San Juan, Puerto Rico

- Interactive map of San Juan Puerto Rico Temple
- Number: 176
- Dedication: 15 January 2023, by D. Todd Christofferson
- Site: 2.97 acres (1.20 ha)
- Floor area: 6,988 ft^{2} (649.2 m^{2})
- Height: 74 ft (23 m)
- Official website • News & images

Church chronology
← Quito Ecuador Temple	San Juan Puerto Rico Temple	→ Richmond Virginia Temple

Additional information
- Announced: 7 October 2018, by Russell M. Nelson
- Groundbreaking: 4 May 2019, by Walter F. González
- Open house: 1-17 December 2022
- Current president: Ruben Pomales
- Location: San Juan, Puerto Rico
- Coordinates: 18°23′08″N 66°01′47″W
- Exterior finish: Concrete
- Baptistries: 1
- Ordinance rooms: 1
- Sealing rooms: 1

The San Juan Puerto Rico Temple is the 176th operating temple of the Church of Jesus Christ of Latter-day Saints (LDS Church), located in San Juan, Puerto Rico. The intent to build the temple was announced on October 7, 2018, by church president Russell M. Nelson, during general conference. It is the church's third temple in the Caribbean and the only one in Puerto Rico, serving the 23,000 members who live there.

The temple has a domed spire and has a Spanish colonial architectural style. A groundbreaking ceremony, to signify the beginning of construction, was held on May 15, 2019, conducted by Walter F. Gonzalez, a church general authority.

== History ==
The intent to construct the temple was announced by church president Russell M. Nelson on October 7, 2018, during general conference, with 11 other temples announced at the same time. That brought the total number of temples operating, under construction, and announced at that time to 201.

Following release of an artist's rendering of the temple a few days earlier, on January 17, 2019, the church announced that a groundbreaking to signify the beginning of construction would be held on May 4, 2019, with Walter F. González, the president of the church's Caribbean Area, presiding. At the groundbreaking, church leaders noted that construction of the temple was anticipated to take about two years.

The temple was originally planned to be completed in 2021, but construction was delayed due to the COVID-19 pandemic. A public open house was held from December 1-17, 2022, and the temple was dedicated by D. Todd Christofferson on January 15, 2023, with over 2,100 church members watching remotely during the three sessions held.

== Design and architecture ==
The building has a Spanish colonial architectural style, coupled with a traditional Latter-day Saint temple design. The temple's architecture reflects both the cultural heritage of San Juan and its spiritual significance to the church. The temple is on a 2.97-acre plot, featuring walkways crafted from locally fabricated concrete.

The temple has a single story and one spire. It is 6,988 square feet and 74 feet tall with the spire (24 feet without), which was inspired by the towers on San Juan City Hall. The exterior of the temple is concrete and inspired by Spanish colonial architecture. The exterior art glass was designed by NWL architects, and was intended to reflect the natural landscape around the temple.

The interior features glasswork that was inspired by quatrefoil motifs on local buildings. The walkways around the temple were made by locally-fabricated concrete The crema vosscione tile was quarried in Mexico and the accent cement tiles were manufactured in Vietnam, while the carpet patterns Spanish Colonial styles and hosts colors evocative of Puerto Rico. The temple’s interior painting pattern was inspired by historical buildings in San Juan. The temple’s color palette includes blue, gold, opal white, and green.

The temple includes one ordinance room, one sealing room, and one baptistry, each arranged for ceremonial use.

The design has elements representing the heritage of the San Juan area. Symbolism is important to church members and includes the quatrefoil motifs used in the art glass windows, which are common in the Spanish colonial architecture of the area’s historic buildings.

== Temple presidents ==
The church's temples are directed by a temple president and matron, each serving for a term of three years. The president and matron oversee the administration of temple operations and provide guidance and training for both temple patrons and staff. Since its dedication in 2023, the president and matron of the San Juan Puerto Rico Temple are Justo P. Casablanca and Lucy R. Casablanca.

== Admittance ==
Following the completion of the temple, a public open house was held from December 1-17, 2022 (excluding Sundays). The temple was dedicated by D. Todd Christofferson on January 15, 2023.

Like all the church's temples, it is not used for Sunday worship services. To members of the church, temples are regarded as sacred houses of the Lord. Once dedicated, only church members with a current temple recommend can enter for worship.

== See also ==
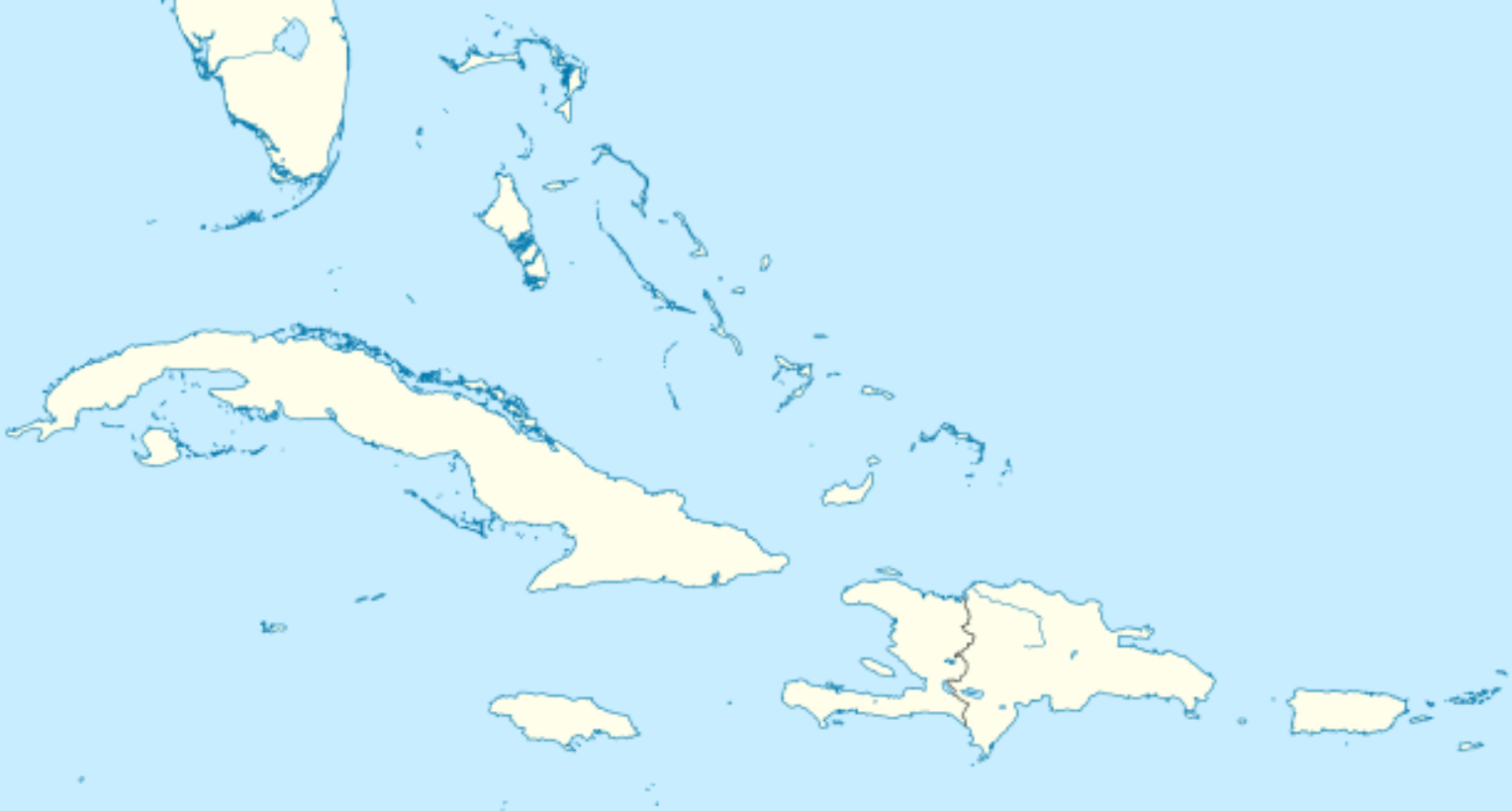

Temples in the Caribbean
= Operating
= Under construction
= Announced
= Temporarily Closed

- The Church of Jesus Christ of Latter-day Saints in Puerto Rico
- Comparison of temples of The Church of Jesus Christ of Latter-day Saints
- List of temples of The Church of Jesus Christ of Latter-day Saints
- List of temples of The Church of Jesus Christ of Latter-day Saints by geographic region
- Temple architecture (Latter-day Saints)
