= Saratoga Springs Utah Temple =

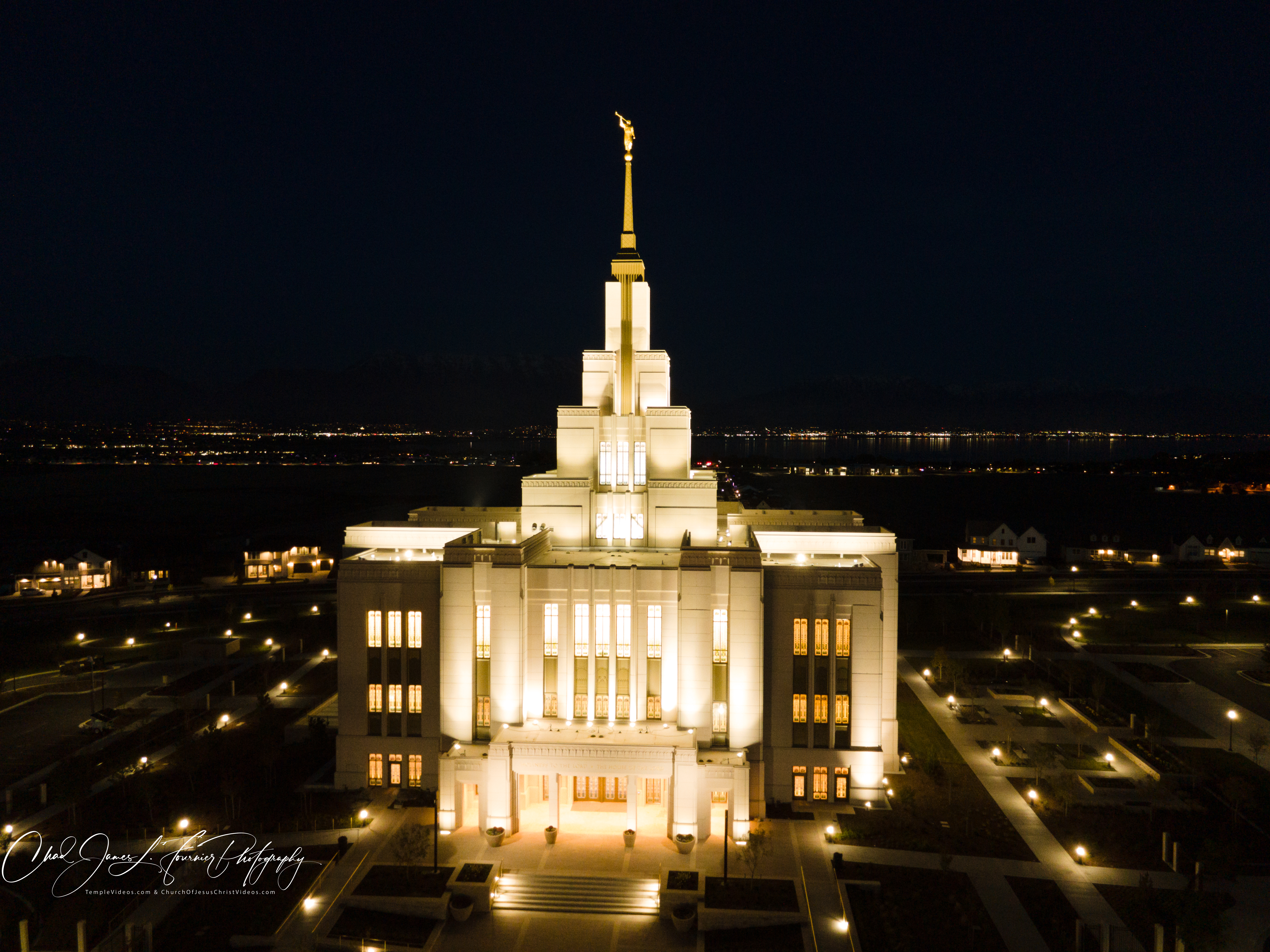
- Interactive map of Saratoga Springs Utah Temple
- Number: 179
- Dedication: 13 August 2023, by Henry B. Eyring
- Site: 22.71 acres (9.19 ha)
- Floor area: 97,836 ft^{2} (9,089.3 m^{2})
- Height: 199.75 ft (60.88 m)
- Official website • News & images

Church chronology
| ← Helena Montana Temple | Saratoga Springs Utah Temple | → Brasília Brazil Temple |

Additional information
- Announced: 2 April 2017, by Thomas S. Monson
- Groundbreaking: 19 October 2019, by Craig C. Christensen
- Open house: 15 April-8 July 2023
- Current president: Lon William Sorensen
- Location: Saratoga Springs, Utah, United States
- Coordinates: 40.3442°N 111.9327°W
- Baptistries: 1
- Ordinance rooms: 4
- Sealing rooms: 6

The Saratoga Springs Utah Temple is a temple of the Church of Jesus Christ of Latter-day Saints in Saratoga Springs, Utah. The intent to build the temple was announced on April 2, 2017, by church president Thomas S. Monson, during general conference. The temple is the 18th in Utah and the fifth in Utah County. A groundbreaking ceremony, to signify the beginning of construction, was held on October 19, 2019, conducted by Craig C. Christensen, a church general authority.

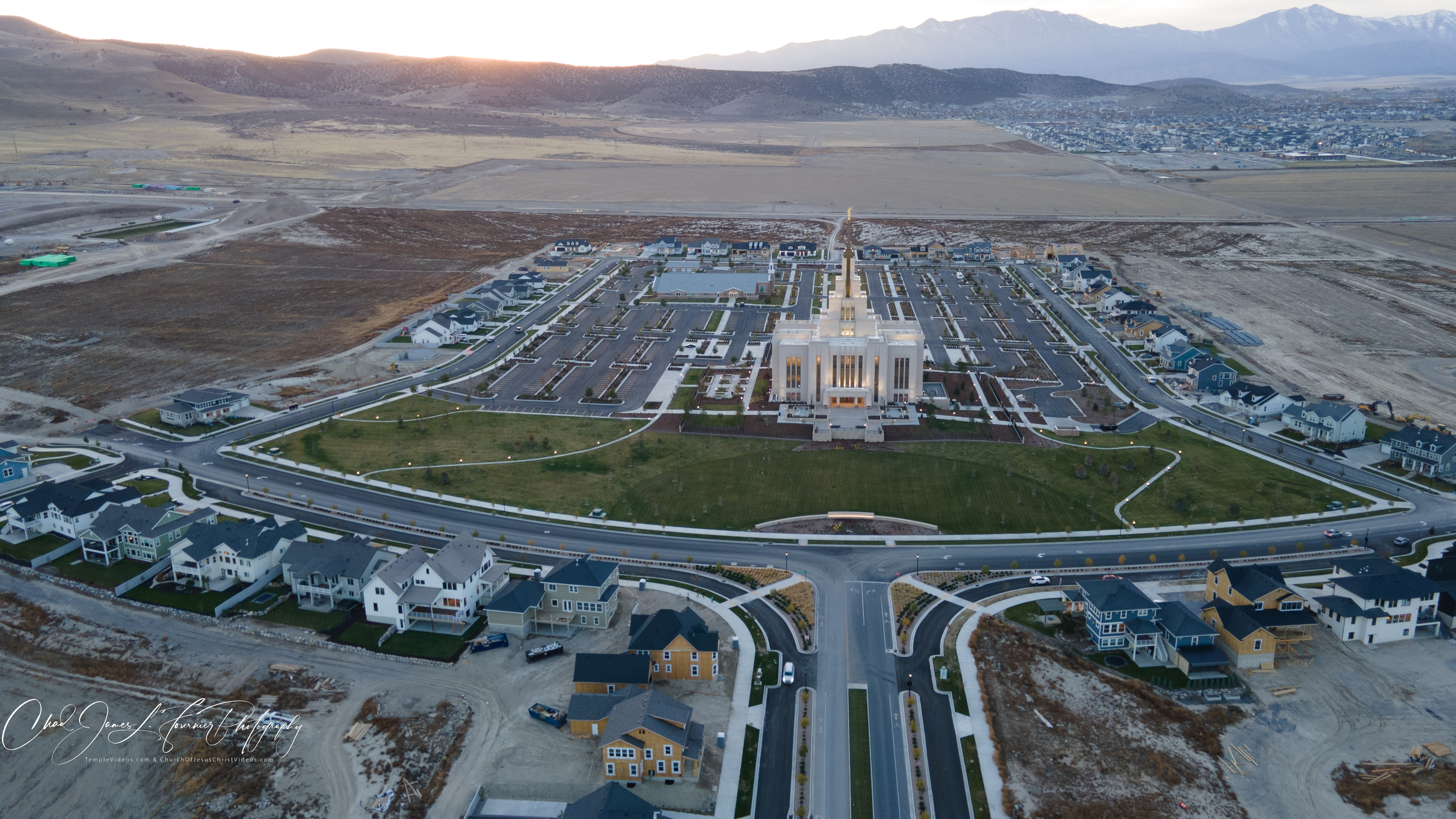
Saratoga Springs Utah Temple

== History ==
The intent to construct the temple was announced by church president Thomas S. Monson on April 2, 2017, during general conference. It was the last announced by Monson before his death in January 2018. When it was completed, it was the 14th temple in Utah.

On May 7, 2019, the church announced preliminary information on the temple's anticipated location and size. A groundbreaking, to signify beginning of construction, was held on October 19, 2019, with Craig C. Christensen, president of the church's Utah Area, presiding.

On November 21, 2022, the church announced that a public open house would be held from April 15 through July 8, 2023, excluding Sundays. The temple was dedicated on August 13, 2023, by Henry B. Eyring, of the church's First Presidency.

== Design and architecture ==
The building has a traditional Latter-day Saint temple design. Its architecture reflects the cultural heritage of the Saratoga Springs region and its spiritual significance to the church.

The temple sits on a 22.7-acre plot, and the landscaping around the temple features local plants, evergreen trees, and shrubs. A meetinghouse is also located on the site.

The temple has a single attached central spire topped with a statue of the angel Moroni. The structure stands three stories tall, constructed with beige precast concrete panels. The exterior has a decorative band with a mountain design that wraps around the temple, metal panels with images of Utah Lake wetlands and snowy egrets, and art glass windows.

The interior design features a motif of stylized wildflowers, including irises, daisies, and chrysanthemums, centered around a color palette of purples, blues, greens, and golds, designed to represent the nearby Wasatch Mountains and Utah Lake. The natural landscape around the temple is also referenced in stylized lines that symbolize water, waves, and mountains and appear throughout the temple. The art glass throughout the temple reflects colors and forms from both the interior and exterior.

The temple includes four ordinance rooms, six sealing rooms, and one baptistry, each arranged for ceremonial use.

The design has elements representing the heritage of the Saratoga Springs area, which provide spiritual meaning to the temple's appearance and function. Symbolism is important to church members and are depicted throughout the temple, including in the interior art glass windows. The windows in the baptistry feature a snowy egret, which is a Saratoga Springs City logo; there are wave and water patterns at the bottom of the windows to represent Utah Lake, as well as stylized mountains to symbolize the Wasatch Mountains.

== Church activities ==
While the temple was under construction, several stakes held pioneer trek events near the grounds. These are events where young church members “reenact some of the faith-building experiences of the pioneers who journeyed to the Salt Lake Valley in the mid-1800s. Youth could be organized into groups or ‘families,’ wear pioneer-era clothing, pull handcarts, and discuss the faith of those who made courageous sacrifices to gather to Zion.” A 5K run took place the day before the temple’s dedication.

== Temple presidents ==
The church's temples are directed by a temple president and matron, each serving for a term of three years. The president and matron oversee the administration of temple operations and provide guidance and training for both temple patrons and staff. Since its 2023 dedication, Lon W. Sorensen and Marie Sorensen have been the president and matron.

== Admittance ==
Following the temple’s completion, the church held a public open house from April 15-July 8, 2023 (excluding Sundays). Over the course of the open house, 587,749 people visited the temple. The temple was dedicated by Henry B. Eyring on August 13, 2023.

Like all the church's temples, it is not used for Sunday worship services. To members of the church, temples are regarded as sacred houses of the Lord. Once dedicated, only church members with a current temple recommend can enter for worship.

== See also ==
Temples in Utah
Wasatch Front Temples
Temples along the Wasatch Front
- = Operating
- = Under construction
- = Announced
- = Temporarily Closed

- The Church of Jesus Christ of Latter-day Saints in Utah
- Comparison of temples (LDS Church)
- List of temples (LDS Church)
- List of temples by geographic region (LDS Church)
- Temple architecture (LDS Church)
