= Richmond Virginia Temple =

177th LDS temple in Richmond, Virginia

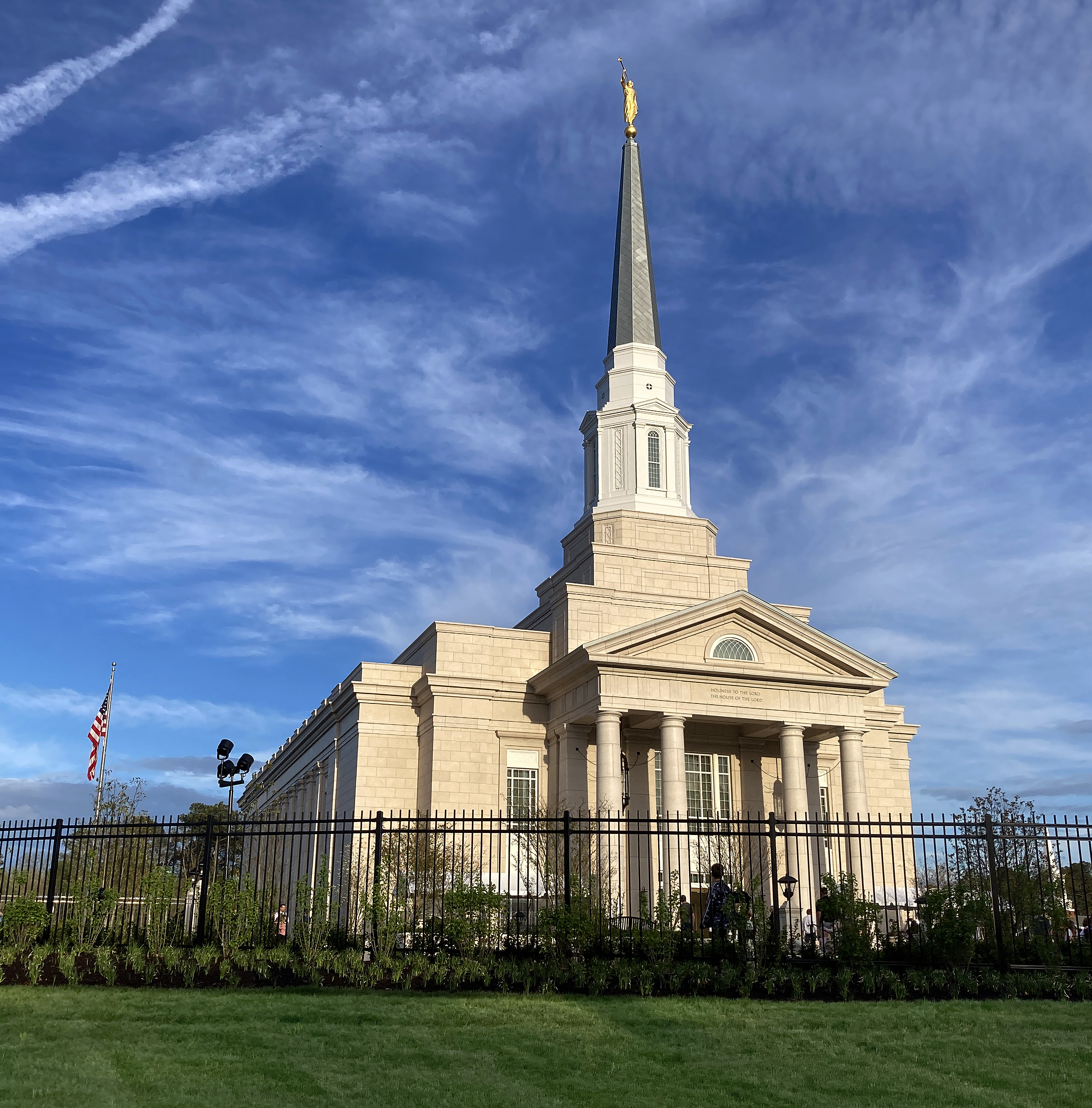
- Interactive map of Richmond Virginia Temple
- Number: 177
- Dedication: 7 May 2023, by Dallin H. Oaks
- Site: 12 acres (4.9 ha)
- Floor area: 39,202 ft^{2} (3,642.0 m^{2})
- Height: 164 ft (50 m)
- Official website • News & images

Church chronology
← San Juan Puerto Rico Temple	Richmond Virginia Temple	→ Helena Montana Temple

Additional information
- Announced: 1 April 2018, by Russell M. Nelson
- Groundbreaking: 11 April 2020, by Randall K. Bennett
- Open house: 25 March-15 April 2023
- Current president: William Frederick Mullins II
- Designed by: Lanny Herron
- Location: Glen Allen, Virginia, United States
- Coordinates: 37.6728°N 77.5351°W
- Exterior finish: Moleanos limestone
- Design: Jeffersonian Doric order, single-spire
- Baptistries: 1
- Ordinance rooms: 4
- Sealing rooms: 3

The Richmond Virginia Temple is the 177th operating temple of the Church of Jesus Christ of Latter-day Saints, located in Glen Allen, Virginia, a suburb of Richmond. The intent to build the temple was announced on April 1, 2018, by church president Russell M. Nelson during general conference. This is the church's first temple in Virginia.

The temple has a large steeple topped with a statue of the angel Moroni, with its design using local and historical American architecture. A groundbreaking ceremony, to signify the beginning of construction, was held on April 11, 2020, conducted by Randall K. Bennett.

== History ==
The intent to construct the temple was announced by church president Russell M. Nelson on April 1, 2018, concurrently with 6 other temples. At the time, the number of operating and announced temples was 189.

On April 11, 2020, a groundbreaking to signify the beginning of construction was held, with Randall K. Bennett, president of the church's North America Northeast Area, presiding. Due to the COVID-19 pandemic, the groundbreaking ceremony was limited to a handful of leaders and was not broadcast to meetinghouses in the temple district as originally planned.

Following completion of the temple, an open house was held from March 25-April 15, 2023. Over the course of the open house, approximately 46,500 people toured the temple. The temple was dedicated in two sessions on May 7, 2023 by Dallin H. Oaks.

== Design and architecture ==
The temple is built in a blend of Georgian, Federal, and Jeffersonian styles with Doric order, with inspiration taken from Monticello, the University of Virginia, the city of Williamsburg, and other locations across the state.

=== Site ===
The temple sits on a 12-acre plot, and the landscaping around the temple is inspired by “the grounds and gardens of historic Williamsburg” and features local varieties of trees, hedges, and flowers. These elements are designed to provide a tranquil setting that enhances the sacred atmosphere of the site.

=== Exterior ===
The exterior includes interlocking diamond circles and the dogwood flower. The temple is 169 ft. 9 in. tall, with a single spire with the angel Moroni, and four columns at the front entrance.

=== Interior ===
The interior features blue, gold, and red on exterior glass, interior furnishings use early American color palettes, and the foyer depicts a 100-year-old art glass piece of Jesus Christ as the Good Shepherd from an old, East Coast Protestant church. The interior designs of the temple, including the foyer, grand staircase, and carpets, accentuate Jeffersonian ideas and Colonial designs.

The temple includes a celestial room, a baptistry, four instruction rooms, and three sealing rooms, each arranged for ceremonial use.

=== Symbols ===
The design uses elements representing Latter-day Saint symbolism and the history of Virginia, to provide deeper spiritual meaning to the temple's appearance and function. Symbolism is an important subject to church members and include the celestial room, which “represents the progression toward Heavenly Father’s presence,”

== Temple presidents ==
The church's temples are directed by a temple president and matron, each serving for a term of three years. The president and matron oversee the administration of temple operations and provide guidance and training for both temple patrons and staff. Since its dedication in 2023, the temple president has been Larry J. Willis, with Sandra M. Willis as matron.

== Admittance ==
Following the completion of the temple, the church held a public open house from March 25-April 15, 2023 (excluding Sundays). The temple was dedicated by Dallin H. Oaks on May 7, 2023. Like all the church's temples, it is not used for Sunday worship services. To members of the church, temples are regarded as sacred houses of the Lord. Once dedicated, only church members with a current temple recommend can enter for worship.

== See also ==
Temples in the Mid-Atlantic States
- = Operating
- = Under construction
- = Announced
- = Temporarily Closed
- = Historical/Efforts Suspended
- The Church of Jesus Christ of Latter-day Saints in Virginia
- Comparison of temples of The Church of Jesus Christ of Latter-day Saints
- List of temples of The Church of Jesus Christ of Latter-day Saints
- List of temples of The Church of Jesus Christ of Latter-day Saints by geographic region
- Temple architecture (Latter-day Saints)
