= The Church of Jesus Christ of Latter-day Saints in Virginia =

American Christian church

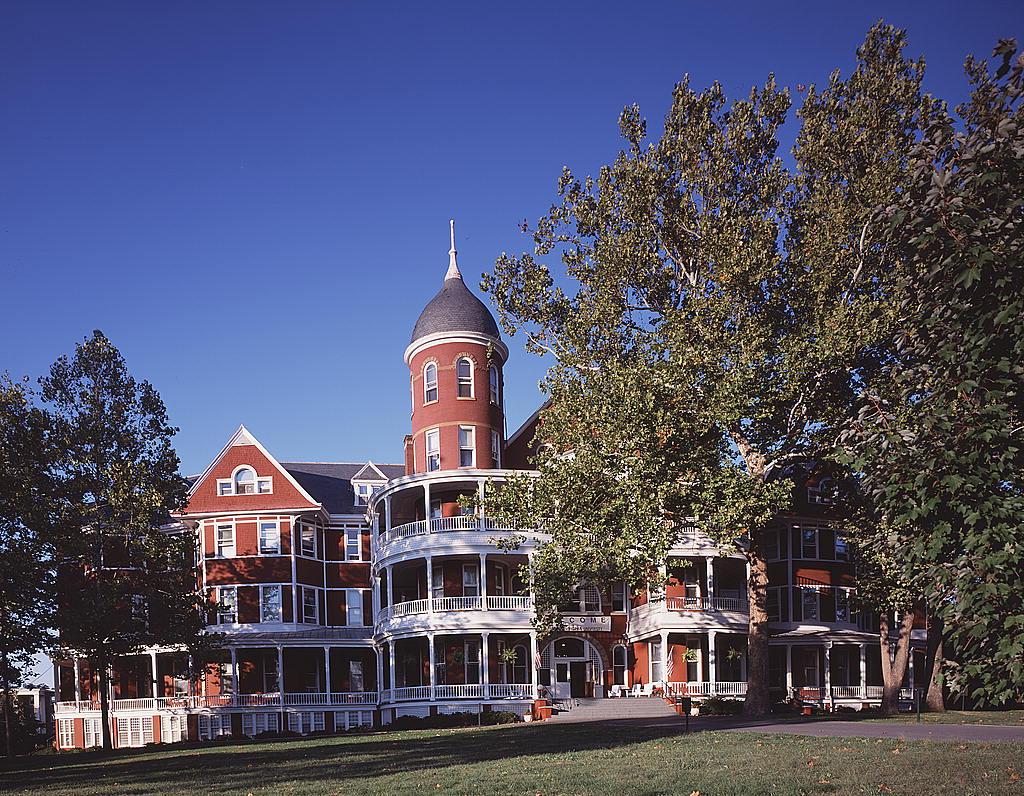
- Main Hall at Southern Virginia University
- Area: US Northeast
- Members: 99,973 (2025)
- Stakes: 22
- Wards: 177
- Branches: 35
- Total Congregations: 212
- Missions: 2
- Temples: 1 operating 1 under construction 2 announced 4 total
- FamilySearch Centers: 46

The Church of Jesus Christ of Latter-day Saints in Virginia refers to the Church of Jesus Christ of Latter-day Saints (LDS Church) and its members in Virginia. In 1841, there were 80 members of the Church. It has since grown to 99,973 members in 212 congregations.

Official church membership as a percentage of general population was 1.13% in 2014. According to the 2014 Pew Forum on Religion & Public Life survey, roughly 2% of Virginians self-identified most closely with the Church of Jesus Christ of Latter-day Saints. The Church is the 7th largest denomination in Virginia.

== History ==
Membership in Virginia
Year	Members
1841	80
1844	350
1930	2,267
1972	22,000
1980	35,485
1990	55,367
1999	66,622
2009	84,876
2019	96,496
2025	99,973
Source: Windall J. Ashton; Jim M. Wall, Deseret News, various years, Church Almanac State Information: Virginia

In 1841, there were some 80 members of the Church in Virginia.

In 1996, a group of Mormon businessmen acquired Southern Virginia College—a two-year private women's college—and turned it into Southern Virginia University, a four-year, coeducational school with a Brigham Young University-like honor code in Buena Vista.

In 2011, Time magazine profiled the large population of singles, or Young Single Adults, in the DC area—including the new 23rd Street Chapel.

In April 2018, church president Russell M. Nelson announced the first temple to be built in Virginia. The site chosen for the Richmond Virginia Temple is the northwestern part of the Richmond area in the city of Glen Allen.

== Stakes ==
LDS stakes are groups of congregations. Wards are medium-sized congregations and branches are small congregations.

Stakes are led by a stake presidency (stake president and two counselors, supported by an executive secretary, a stake clerk, and typically four assistant clerks) and a high council of 12 councilors. Stakes also have presidencies for the Stake Relief Society, Young Women, Young Men, Primary, and Sunday School.

As of July 2026, Virginia had the following stakes:

Stake	Organized	Mission	Temple District
Annandale Virginia	26 Apr 1970	Washington DC South	Washington D.C.
Bella Vista Virginia Stake (Spanish)	1 Feb 2026	Washington DC South	Washington D.C.
Brambleton Virginia	26 Jan 2025	Washington DC South	Washington D.C.
Buena Vista Virginia	6 Jun 1999	West Virginia Charleston	Richmond Virginia
Buena Vista Virginia YSA	15 Apr 2012	West Virginia Charleston	Richmond Virginia
Chesterfield Virginia	30 Oct 1983	Virginia Norfolk	Richmond Virginia
Chesapeake Virginia	17 Jan 1988	Virginia Norfolk	Richmond Virginia
Centreville Virginia	1 Feb 1976	Washington DC South	Washington D.C.
Fredericksburg Virginia	26 Oct 1980	Virginia Richmond	Richmond Virginia
Gainesville Virginia	11 Dec 2016	Washington DC South	Washington D.C.
Johnson City Tennessee (Note: Stake located outside Virginia with congregation(s) meeting in Virginia)	9 Mar 2025	Tennessee Knoxville	Columbia South Carolina
Kingsport Tennessee	13 Jan 1980	Tennessee Knoxville	Columbia South Carolina
Leesburg Virginia	29 Jan 1995	Washington DC South	Washington D.C.
Mechanicsville Virginia	1 Jun 2025	Virginia Richmond	Richmond Virginia
McLean Virginia	14 Feb 1982	Washington DC South	Washington D.C.
Midlothian Virginia	4 Dec 2005	Virginia Richmond	Richmond Virginia
Mount Airy North Carolina	17 May 2026	North Carolina Charlotte	Raleigh North Carolina
Mount Vernon Virginia	5 Jan 1986	Washington DC South	Washington D.C.
Newport News Virginia	12 Jun 1977	Virginia Norfolk	Richmond Virginia
Oakton Virginia	3 Mar 1963	Washington DC South	Washington D.C.
Pembroke Virginia	14 May 1978	West Virginia Charleston	Richmond Virginia
Piedmont Virginia	23 Mar 2025	Virginia Norfolk	Richmond Virginia
Richmond Virginia	30 Jun 1957	Virginia Richmond	Richmond Virginia
Roanoke Virginia	11 Jan 1970	West Virginia Charleston	Richmond Virginia
Stafford Virginia	21 Aug 2016	Virginia Richmond	Richmond Virginia
Virginia Beach	12 Apr 1964	Virginia Norfolk	Richmond Virginia
Washington DC YSA South (Note: The Washington DC YSA South Stake encompasses the Virginia side DC Metro area)	4 Dec 2016	Washington DC South	Washington D.C.
Waynesboro Virginia	28 May 1978	Virginia Richmond	Richmond Virginia
Winchester Virginia	22 May 1977	Maryland Baltimore	Washington D.C.
Woodbridge Virginia	16 May 2004	Washington DC South	Washington D.C.

== Missions ==
Mission	Created	Mission office	Stakes in Virginia
Virginia Richmond Mission	October 26, 1947	Richmond, VA	6
Washington D.C. South Mission	October 16, 1960	Burke, VA	7
West Virginia Charleston Mission		Charleston, WV	4 (of 7)
Maryland Baltimore Mission		Ellicott City, MD	1 (of 7)

== Temples ==
Red = Operating temple
Blue = Temple under construction
Yellow = Announced temple
Black = Temple closed for renovations

177. Richmond Virginia Temple; Official website; News & images	
Location: Announced: Groundbreaking: Dedicated: Size: Style:	Glen Allen, Virginia, United States; 1 April 2018 by Russell M. Nelson; 11 April 2020 by Randall K. Bennett; 7 May 2023 by Dallin H. Oaks; 39,202 sq ft (3,642.0 m^{2}) on a 12-acre (4.9 ha) site Jeffersonian Doric order, single-spire - designed by Lanny Herron
265. Winchester Virginia Temple (Under construction); Official website; News & images	
Location: Announced: Groundbreaking: Size:	Winchester, Virginia, United States; 2 April 2023 by Russell M. Nelson; 9 August 2025 by Robert M. Daines; 30,000 sq ft (2,800 m^{2}) on a 11.27-acre (4.56 ha) site
337. Roanoke Virginia Temple (Announced); Official website; News & images	
Location: Announced:	Roanoke, Virginia; 1 October 2023 by Russell M. Nelson
381. Norfolk Virginia Temple (Site announced); Official website; News & images	
Location: Announced: Size:	Norfolk, Virginia; 6 April 2025 by Russell M. Nelson; 18,650 sq ft (1,733 m^{2}) on a 23-acre (9.3 ha) site

== See also ==
- Virginia: Religion
- Southern Virginia University
