= Moses Lake Washington Temple =

LDS Church temple

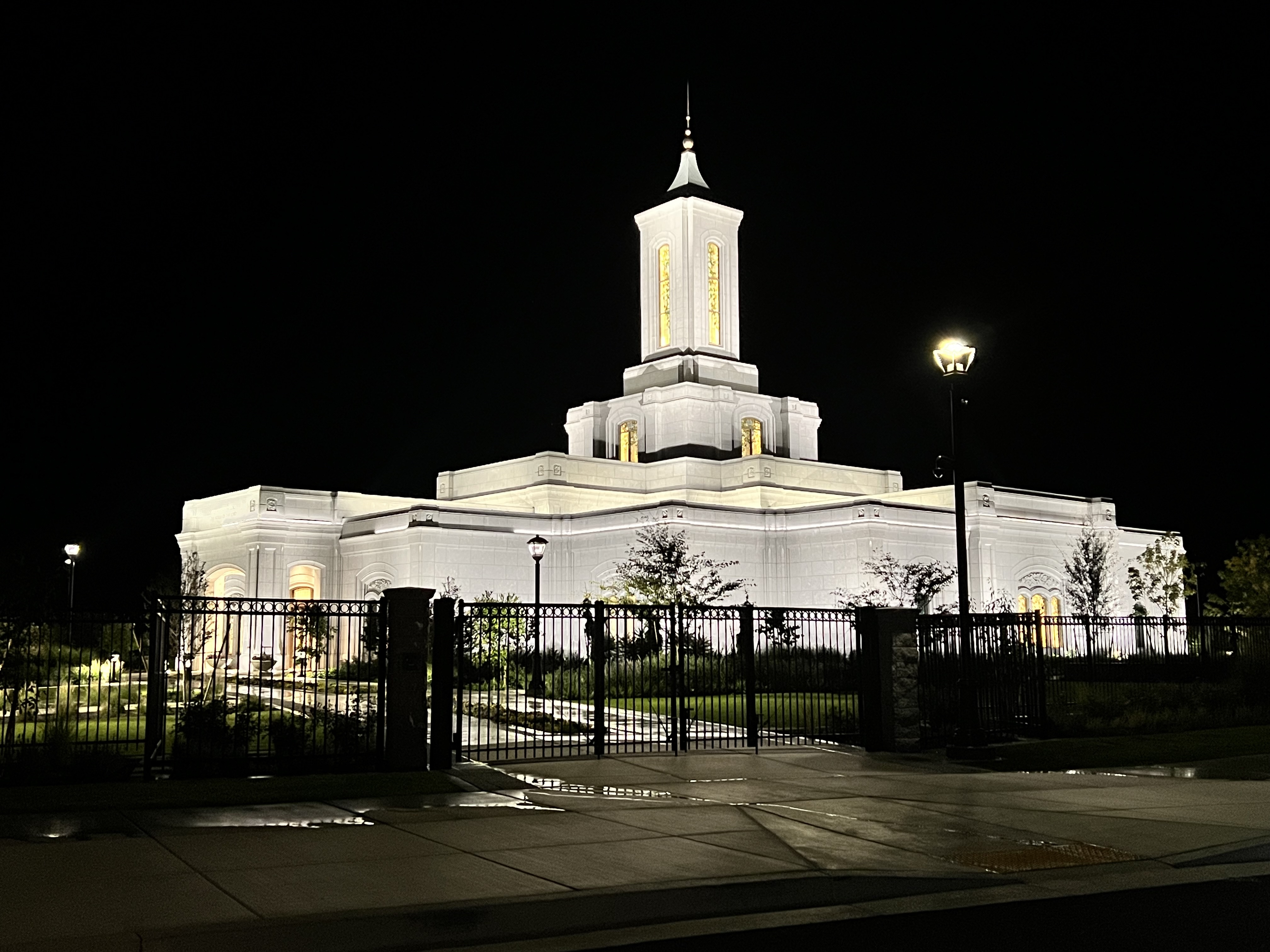
- Moses Lake Washington Temple
- Interactive map of Moses Lake Washington Temple
- Number: 182
- Dedication: 17 September 2023, by Quentin L. Cook
- Site: 17.2 acres (7.0 ha)
- Floor area: 28,933 ft^{2} (2,688.0 m^{2})
- Height: 117.5 ft (35.8 m)
- Official website • News & images

Church chronology
← Bentonville Arkansas Temple	Moses Lake Washington Temple	→ McAllen Texas Temple

Additional information
- Announced: 7 April 2019, by Russell M. Nelson
- Groundbreaking: 10 October 2020, by David L. Stapleton
- Open house: 4-17 August 2023
- Current president: Paul Wade Bergeson
- Location: Moses Lake, Washington, United States
- Coordinates: 47°06′48″N 119°16′27″W
- Baptistries: 1
- Ordinance rooms: 2
- Sealing rooms: 2

The Moses Lake Washington Temple is a temple of the Church of Jesus Christ of Latter-day Saints (LDS Church) in Moses Lake, Washington. The intent to build the temple was announced on April 7, 2019, by church president Russell M. Nelson, during general conference. After its dedication in September 2023, it became the church's fourth temple in the state of Washington.

This temple was designed by CRSA, an architectural firm located in Salt Lake City, Utah. A groundbreaking ceremony, to signify the beginning of construction, was held on October 10, 2020, conducted by David L. Stapleton, a church area seventy.

== History ==
On April 7, 2019, during general conference, church president Russell M. Nelson announced plans to construct the Moses Lake Washington Temple. The temple's location, a 17.2-acre (7.0 ha) site located on Yonezawa Boulevard between Division Street and Road K NE, was announced on October 29, 2019. It is visible from Interstate 90, which runs along the south side of the property.

On April 7, 2020, a rendering of the temple was released. Plans showed a single-story temple of roughly 20,000 square feet (1,900 m^{2}) with a center spire. On September 11, 2020, the church announced that a groundbreaking, to signify the beginning of construction, would take place the following month. The groundbreaking was on October 10, 2020, with David L. Stapleton, an area seventy, presiding.

On March 13, 2023, the church announced that a public open house would be held from Friday, August 4, through Saturday, August 19, except for Sundays. The temple was dedicated on September 17, 2023, by Quentin L. Cook, of the church's Quorum of the Twelve Apostles. The Bentonville Arkansas and Brasilia Brazil temples were dedicated on the same day.

== Design and architecture ==
The building has a traditional Latter-day Saint temple design, created by the Salt Lake City-based architectural firm CRSA. Its architecture reflects the cultural heritage of the Moses Lake region and its spiritual significance to the church.

The temple is on a 17.2-acre (7.0 ha) plot, and the landscaping around the temple features plants common to the region. There is also a meetinghouse located on the site.

The temple has a rectangular cupola and spire. The single-story structure was constructed with Branco Cristal granite. The temple’s exterior also features art glass windows with an apple blossom motif and prairie-style border patterns.

The interior features decorative painting, centered around patterns inspired by the region’s prevalent crops, including “potato blossoms, alfalfa blossoms, apple blossoms and cherry blossoms.” The interior also includes art glass windows similar to those seen on the temple’s exterior, with apple blossom motifs and decorative borders. The temple includes two instruction rooms, two sealing rooms, and a baptistry, each arranged for ceremonial use.

The design uses elements representing the heritage of the Moses Lake region, providing spiritual meaning to the temple's appearance and function. Symbolism is important to church members and includes the interior and exterior decorative motifs, which feature prevalent crops in the region, as well as the prairie-style patterned borders on the art glass windows, which represents "the Native Americans who inhabited the Moses Lake area long before the first farm was settled."

== Temple presidents ==
The church's temples are directed by a temple president and matron, each serving for a term of three years. The president and matron oversee the administration of temple operations and provide guidance and training for both temple patrons and staff. Since its 2023 dedication, Paul W. Bergeson and Debra A. Bergeson are the president and matron.

== Admittance ==
Following completion of the temple, a public open house was held from August 4–19, 2023 (excluding Sundays). Over 60,000 people toured the temple during the open house. The temple was dedicated by Quentin L. Cook on September 23, 2017, in two sessions.

Like all the church's temples, it is not used for Sunday worship services. To members of the church, temples are regarded as sacred houses of the Lord. Once dedicated, only church members with a current temple recommend can enter for worship

== See also ==
Temples in and near Washington ()

Temples in Washington or with districts
extending into Washington
= Operating
= Under construction
= Announced
= Temporarily Closed

- Comparison of temples of The Church of Jesus Christ of Latter-day Saints
- List of temples of The Church of Jesus Christ of Latter-day Saints
- List of temples of The Church of Jesus Christ of Latter-day Saints by geographic region
- Temple architecture (Latter-day Saints)
- The Church of Jesus Christ of Latter-day Saints in Washington
