= The Church of Jesus Christ of Latter-day Saints in Montana =

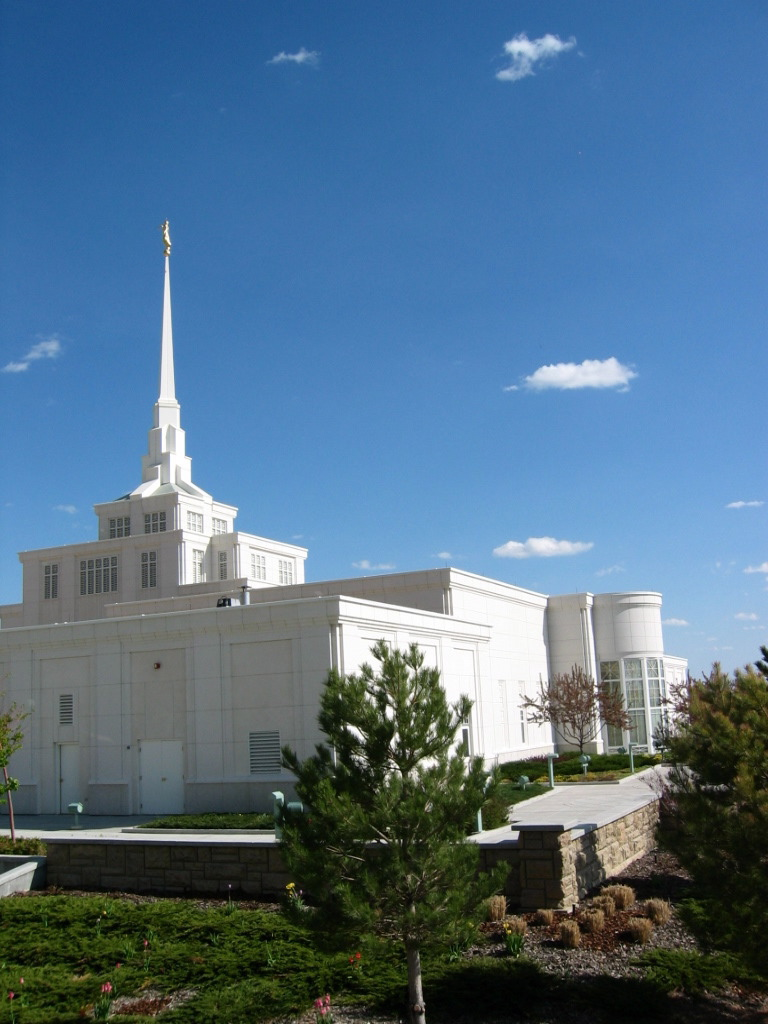
- The Billings Montana Temple
- Area: US Central
- Members: 52,050 (2025)
- Stakes: 13
- Wards: 97
- Branches: 43
- Total Congregations: 140
- Missions: 1
- Temples: 2 operating 1 announced 3 total
- FamilySearch Centers: 50

The Church of Jesus Christ of Latter-day Saints in Montana refers to the Church of Jesus Christ of Latter-day Saints (LDS Church) and its members in Montana. The church's first congregation in Montana was organized in 1895.

Official church membership as a percentage of general population was 4.78% in 2014. According to the 2014 Pew Forum on Religion & Public Life survey, 4% of Montanans self-identify themselves most closely with the LDS Church. The LDS Church is the 2nd largest denomination in Montana behind the Roman Catholic Church.

Stakes are located in Billings (3), Bozeman, Butte, Frenchtown, Glendive, Great Falls (2), Helena, Kalispell, Missoula, and Stevensville.

== History ==
Membership in Montana
Year	Membership
1930	1,181
1940	5,210
1950	6,416
1960	23,890
1980	30,784
1989*	34,000
1999	39,842
2009	45,517
2019	50,552
2025	52,050
*Membership was published as a rounded number.

Mormonism in Montana predates the formal arrival of the LDS Church. Members of the Reorganized Church of Jesus Christ of Latter Day Saints, who dissented from the LDS Church's doctrine regarding polygamy, first arrived in the Montana in 1868. The practice of polygamy was outlawed in the Montana territory, as it was in much of the western United States. It was not until 1896 that the LDS Church, having renounced the former practice of polygamy, arrived in the Montana Territory with the organization of the Montana Mission.

Plans to build an LDS Church temple in Montana were announced in August 1996. About 4,800 people gathered during a spring snowstorm to witness the groundbreaking on March 28, 1998.

In 2017, a new meetinghouse was constructed on the Billings West End, adding to the other six buildings in Billings and six others in surrounding area.

== County Statistics ==
List of LDS Church adherents in each county as of 2010 according to the Association of Religion Data Archives: Note: Each county adherent count reflects meetinghouse location of congregation and not by location of residence. Census count reflects location of residence which may skew percent of population where adherents reside in a different county as their congregational meetinghouse.

County	Congregations	Adherents	% of Population
Beaverhead	4	1,051	11.37
Big Horn	1	802	6.23
Blaine	1	168	2.59
Broadwater	1	397	7.07
Carbon	2	400	3.97
Carter	1	86	7.41
Cascade	10	4,125	5.07
Chouteau	1	167	2.87
Custer	1	480	4.10
Daniels	0		
Dawson	1	411	4.58
Deer Lodge	1	542	5.83
Fallon	0		
Fergus	1	468	4.04
Flathead	9	4,011	4.41
Gallatin	9	3,582	4.00
Garfield	1	58	4.81
Glacier	1	294	2.19
Golden Valley	0		
Granite	2	303	9.84
Hill	1	591	3.67
Jefferson	1	128	1.12
Judith Basin	0		
Lake	3	1,415	4.92
Lewis and Clark	6	2,965	4.68
Liberty	1	56	2.39
Lincoln	3	981	4.98
Madison	2	407	5.29
McCone	0		
Meagher	1	48	2.54
Mineral	1	209	4.95
Missoula	9	4,879	4.46
Musselshell	1	270	5.95
Park	2	640	4.09
Petroleum	0		
Phillips	1	138	3.25
Pondera	1	276	4.49
Powder River	1	32	1.84
Powell	1	434	6.18
Prairie	0		
Ravalli	6	2,606	6.48
Richland	1	287	2.95
Roosevelt	2	898	8.61
Rosebud	2	607	6.57
Sanders	2	540	4.73
Sheridan	1	86	2.54
Silver Bow	2	1,726	5.05
Stillwater	1	228	2.50
Sweet Grass	1	111	3.04
Teton	2	538	8.86
Toole	1	282	5.30
Treasure	0		
Valley	1	200	2.71
Wheatland	1	105	4.84
Wibaux	0		
Yellowstone	14	7,140	4.83

== Stakes ==
As of September 2026, the following stakes had congregations in Montana:

Stake	Organized	Mission	Temple District
Billings Montana East	12 Jun 1977	Montana Billings	Billings Montana
Billings Montana South	12 Nov 2017	Montana Billings	Billings Montana
Billings Montana	10 Feb 1963	Montana Billings	Billings Montana
Bonners Ferry Idaho (Note: Stake located outside of Montana with congregation(s) meeting in Montana)	13 Apr 2025	Idaho Coeur d’Alene Mission	Spokane Washington
Bozeman Montana	16 Sep 1979	Montana Billings	Helena Montana
Butte Montana	28 Jun 1953	Montana Missoula	Helena Montana
Glendive Montana	4 May 1997	North Dakota Bismarck	Billings Montana
Great Falls Montana East	5 Nov 1978	Montana Missoula	Helena Montana
Great Falls Montana	16 Jun 1957	Montana Missoula	Helena Montana
Helena Montana	8 Sep 1968	Montana Missoula	Helena Montana
Kalispell Montana	20 Nov 1970	Montana Missoula	Cardston Alberta
Missoula Montana	16 Jun 1957	Montana Missoula	Helena Montana
Ronan Montana	26 Feb 2017	Montana Missoula	Helena Montana
Stevensville Montana	21 Oct 1979	Montana Missoula	Helena Montana
Three Forks Montana	16 Feb 2025	Montana Missoula	Helena Montana

== Missions ==
The West Central States Mission was created on November 11, 1950, as a division of the North Central States, North Western States, and Western States missions. It was renamed Montana–Wyoming Mission in June 1970. The mission name was changed to the Montana Billings Mission four years later. In June 2024, the Montana Missoula Mission was created.

== Temples ==

Temples in Montana

- = Operating
- = Under construction
- = Announced
- = Temporarily Closed

Montana has 2 operating temples (Billings and Helena) and one additional (Missoula) that has been announced to be constructed.

66. Billings Montana Temple; Official website; News & images	
Location: Announced: Groundbreaking: Dedicated: Size: Style:	Billings, Montana, United States; August 30, 1996 by Gordon B. Hinckley; March 30, 1998 by Hugh W. Pinnock; November 20, 1999 by Gordon B. Hinckley; 33,800 sq ft (3,140 m^{2}) on a 10-acre (4.0 ha) site Classic modern, single-spire design - designed by CTA Architects Engineers
178. Helena Montana Temple; Official website; News & images	
Location: Announced: Groundbreaking: Dedicated: Size:	Helena, Montana, United States; April 4, 2021 by Russell M. Nelson; June 26, 2021 by Vern P. Stanfill; 18 June 2023 by Gary E. Stevenson; 9,794 sq ft (909.9 m^{2}) on a 4.75-acre (1.92 ha) site
280. Missoula Montana Temple (Under construction); Official website; News & images	
Location: Announced: Groundbreaking: Size:	Missoula, Montana; 3 April 2022 by Russell M. Nelson; 6 June 2026 by Jose A. Teixeira; 19,000 sq ft (1,800 m^{2}) on a 5.08-acre (2.06 ha) site

== See also ==
- The Church of Jesus Christ of Latter-day Saints membership statistics (United States)
- Religion in Montana
