= Brasília Brazil Temple =

LDS Church temple in Brasília, Brazil

- Interactive map of Brasília Brazil Temple
- Number: 180
- Dedication: 17 September 2023, by Neil L. Andersen
- Site: 6 acres (2.4 ha)
- Floor area: 25,000 ft^{2} (2,300 m^{2})
- Official website • News & images

Church chronology
| ← Saratoga Springs Utah Temple | Brasília Brazil Temple | → Bentonville Arkansas Temple |

Additional information
- Announced: 2 April 2017, by Thomas S. Monson
- Groundbreaking: 26 September 2020, by Adilson de Paula Parrella
- Open house: 12 August-2 September 2023
- Current president: Natan Ruiz Fontes
- Location: Brasília, Brazil
- Coordinates: 15.7480°S 47.8809°W
- Baptistries: 1
- Ordinance rooms: 2
- Sealing rooms: 2

The Brasília Brazil Temple is a temple of the Church of Jesus Christ of Latter-day Saints (LDS Church) in Brasília, Brazil. The intent to build the temple was announced on April 2, 2017, by church president Thomas S. Monson, during general conference. The temple was completed and dedicated September 17, 2023 by Neil L. Andersen. At completion it was 10th temple built by the LDS Church in Brazil.

== History ==
The intent to construct the temple was announced by church president Thomas S. Monson on April 2, 2017, concurrently with four other temples. At the time, the church's total number of operating or announced temples was 182.

On September 26, 2020, a groundbreaking ceremony to signify the beginning of construction was held, with Adilson de Paula Parrella, president of the church's Brazil Area, presiding.

Following completion of the temple, the temple was dedicated on September 17, 2023, by Neil L. Andersen, of the Quorum of the Twelve Apostles. The Bentonville Arkansas and Moses Lake Washington temples were dedicated the same day, the first time in church history that three temples were dedicated on one day. Upon completion, the Brasília Brazil Temple was the 10th LDS temple built in Brazil.

== Design and architecture ==
The building has a 20th-century Brazilian modernist style and a traditional Latter-day Saint temple design. Its architecture reflects the work of architect Oscar Niemeyer, who designed many buildings in Brasília, and who "used clean lines, expansive cantilevers and complex curves to evoke the subtle arched lines seen in sailboats."

The temple sits on a 6-acre plot, and the landscaping around the temple features shrubs, perennials, and hundreds of trees. These enhance the sacred atmosphere of the site, which also houses a meetinghouse and patron housing facility.

The temple has a single attached central spire, and is constructed with white Brazilian marble. The exterior has multiple arches and hand-colored stained glass windows with an ombre blue design and cream and white details.

The interior has floors "covered in porcelain and Bahia blue stone tiles, carpets made in Brazil, and Paraná white marble, which is native to Brazil." The interior also includes decorative painting and crystal chandeliers. The temple includes two instruction rooms, two sealing rooms, and a baptistry, each arranged for ceremonial use.

== See also ==
- The Church of Jesus Christ of Latter-day Saints in Brazil
- List of temples of The Church of Jesus Christ of Latter-day Saints
