= The Church of Jesus Christ of Latter-day Saints in Arkansas =

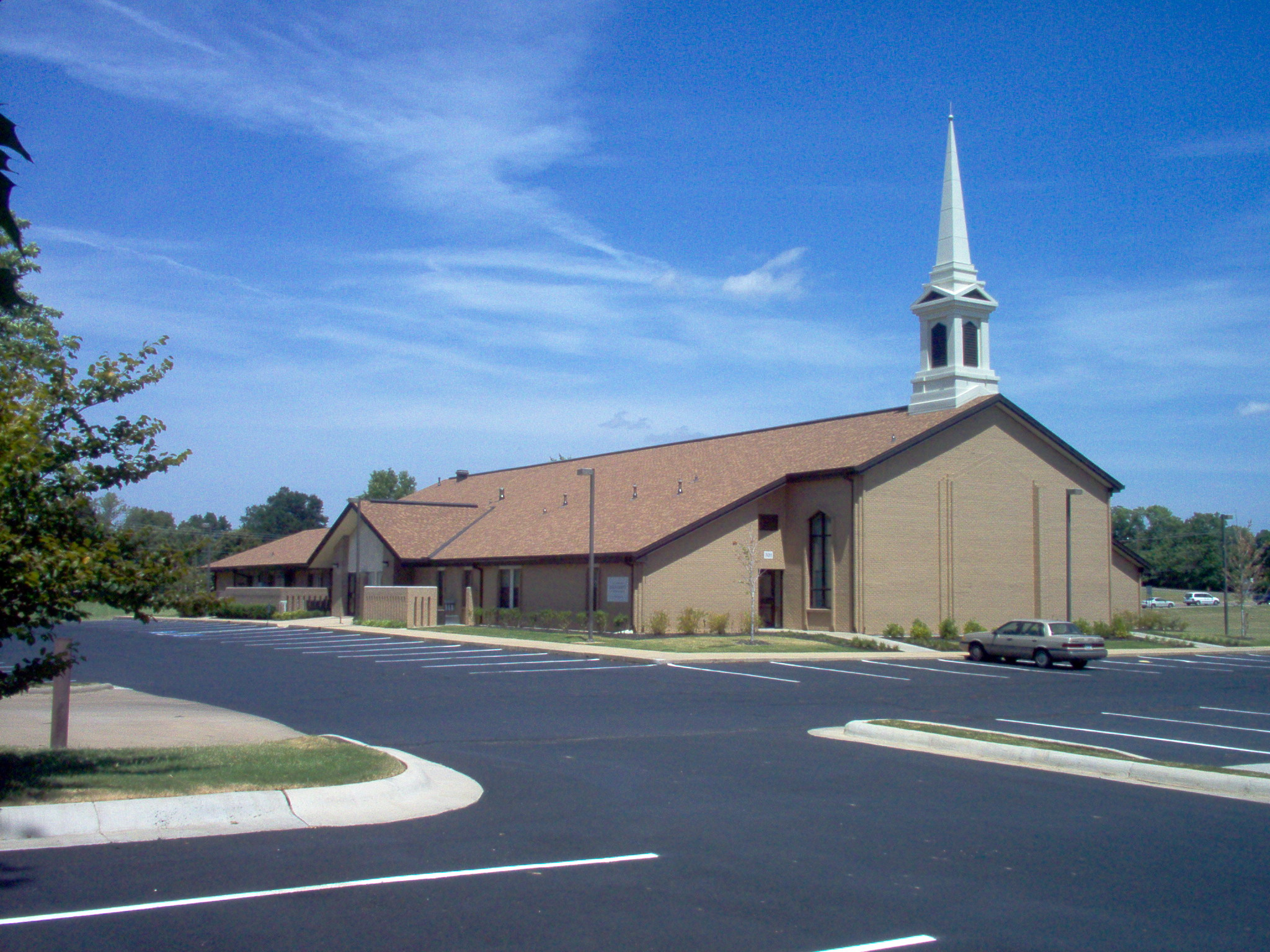
- A meetinghouse in Jonesboro, Arkansas
- Area: US Southeast
- Members: 38,035 (2025)
- Stakes: 8
- Wards: 55
- Branches: 24
- Total Congregations: 79
- Missions: 2
- Temples: 1
- FamilySearch Centers: 25

The Church of Jesus Christ of Latter-day Saints in Arkansas refers to the Church of Jesus Christ of Latter-day Saints (LDS Church) and its members in Arkansas. The first branch in Arkansas was organized in 1890. It has since grown to 38,035 members in 79 congregations.

Official church membership as a percentage of general population was 1.00% in 2014. According to the 2014 Pew Forum on Religion & Public Life survey, roughly 1% of Arkansans self-identified most closely with the Church of Jesus Christ of Latter-day Saints. The LDS Church is the 9th largest denomination in Arkansas.

== History ==
Membership in Arkansas
Year	Members
1906	248
1914	100
1916	454
1926	389
1930	944
1936	179
1971	4,538
1980	7,480
1990	10,446
1995	17,000
2000	20,580
2010	27,559
2015	30,447
2020	32,307
2025	38,035
Source: Windall J. Ashton; Jim M. Wall, Deseret News, various years, Church Almanac State Information: Arkansas

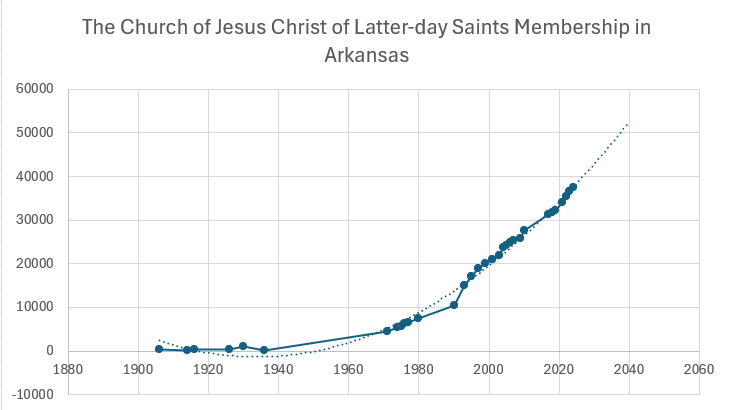
LDS Membership History in Arkansas

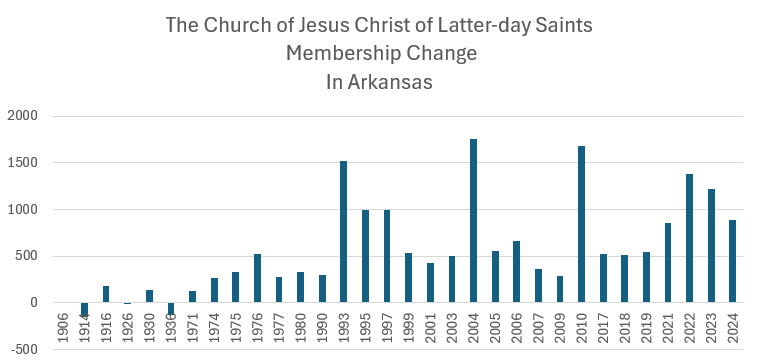
LDS Membership Change by Adherents in Arkansas

Elders Wilford Woodruff and Henry Brown arrived as missionaries in Bentonville on January 28, 1835. They held their first meeting four days later and preached to an attentive congregation. Later they were confronted by an apostate member, Alexander Akeman. Akeman had earlier endured severe persecution in Missouri, but later turned bitterly against the Church. However, he died suddenly, and Elder Woodruff preached his funeral sermon. This event, along with Woodruff's teachings, led to the baptism of a Mr. and Mrs. Jonathan Hubbel, the first converts in Arkansas, on 22 February 1835.

In 1838, Elder Abraham O. Smoot was called to a five-month mission to Arkansas where he preached frequently with varied results.

The year 1857 marked a tragic era in Church history in Arkansas. Elder Parley P. Pratt was murdered on May 13, 1857, near Alma, Arkansas. He had just been acquitted by a court in Van Buren of charges pressed by Hector H. McLean, the former husband of Pratt's wife Eleanor. At the trial, she testified that her former husband frequently physically abused her. Disappointed with the verdict, the McLean followed and assassinated the apostle. (On April 2, 2008, Crawford County Circuit Judge Gary Cottrell gave the Pratt family permission to move Parley Pratt's remains to Utah.)

Negative feelings, and later the U.S. Civil War, kept the Church from the area for the next two decades.

After the war, the Church again sent missionaries to Arkansas in 1876. In 1877, Elders Henry G. Boyle and J.D.H. McAllister visited a member in Des Arc. By 1877, 27 families totaling 125 converts emigrated west. Through the 1880s, converts continued to join the main body of the saints in Utah.

A permanent presence of the church was established on May 30, 1890, when the first Latter-day Saint meetinghouse was built in White County. Benjamin Franklin Baker, an early influential convert, helped establish the Barney Branch (about 5 miles north of Enola) in 1914 with over 100 members. Rufus Black Tyler was one of the first branch presidents (called March 1915). By 1930, three branches had been organized in Arkansas (Barney, El Dorado, and Little Rock) with a total membership of 944.

The first Arkansas stake was created on June 1, 1969, in Little Rock. This was known at the time as the Arkansas stake and later renamed to the Little Rock Arkansas Stake.

The first institute building, adjacent to the University of Arkansas, was dedicated in the fall of 1999.

On July 20–22, 2006, over 1,000 Latter-day Saint teens from all five of the Arkansas Stakes gathered for a three-day multi-stake youth conference. Elder David A. Bednar of the Quorum of the Twelve and former associate dean of Graduate Studies in the College of Business Administration at the University of Arkansas spoke to the youth and encouraged them to live by high moral standards.

Following Hurricane Katrina in 2005, several thousand Latter-day Saint volunteers, from a seven-state area (including Arkansas), went to Louisiana and Mississippi. Many of them took time out of their jobs or came down on the weekends to help anyone needing assistance regardless of faith.

Arkansas Latter-day Saints volunteered relief in their own area on several occasions, including the April 2, 2006 Tornado Outbreak and the 2008 Super Tuesday tornado outbreak. In September 2008, Arkansas Latter-day Saints went to the Baton Rouge area to aid cleanup efforts following Hurricane Gustav. Church members from northwest Arkansas and West Plains, Missouri Stake assisted in the Joplin, Missouri tornado cleanup in 2011, completing over 7,400 work orders. Arkansas members from Little Rock, North Little Rock, and Searcy Stakes provided volunteers to help clean up homes in the Baton Rouge area following the 2016 flood, completing over 1,400 work orders.

On October 5, 2019, plans to construct a temple in Bentonville were announced during the Women's Session of General Conference.

== Stakes ==
Red = Operating temple
Blue = Temple under construction
Green = Stake center
Both temples on map are adjacent to a stake center.
The Searcy Stake offices are located in Jacksonville.

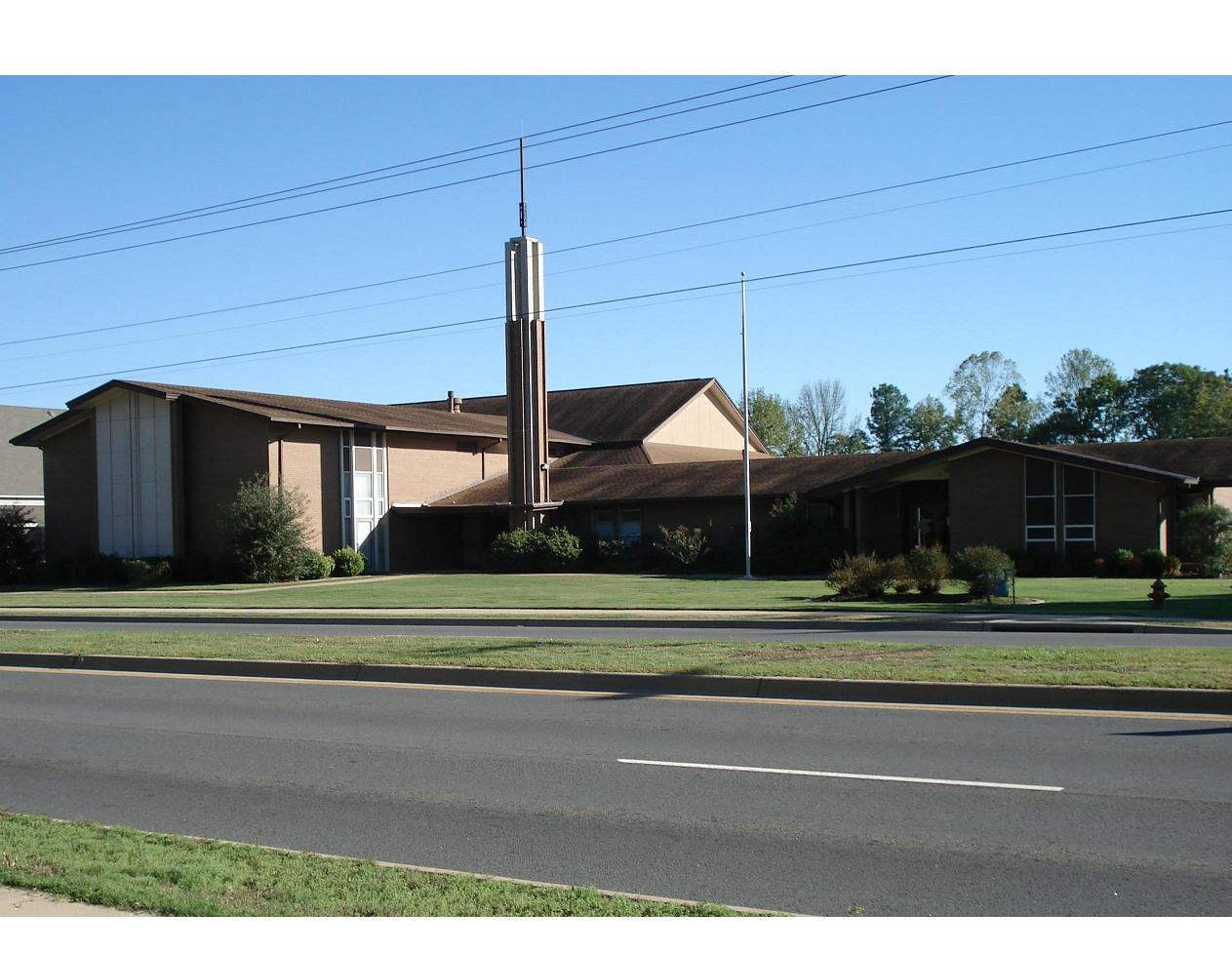
A Latter-day Saint Meetinghouse in Conway, Arkansas

As of July 2026, Arkansas was part of 13 stakes. Eight of those stakes have their stake center within the state.

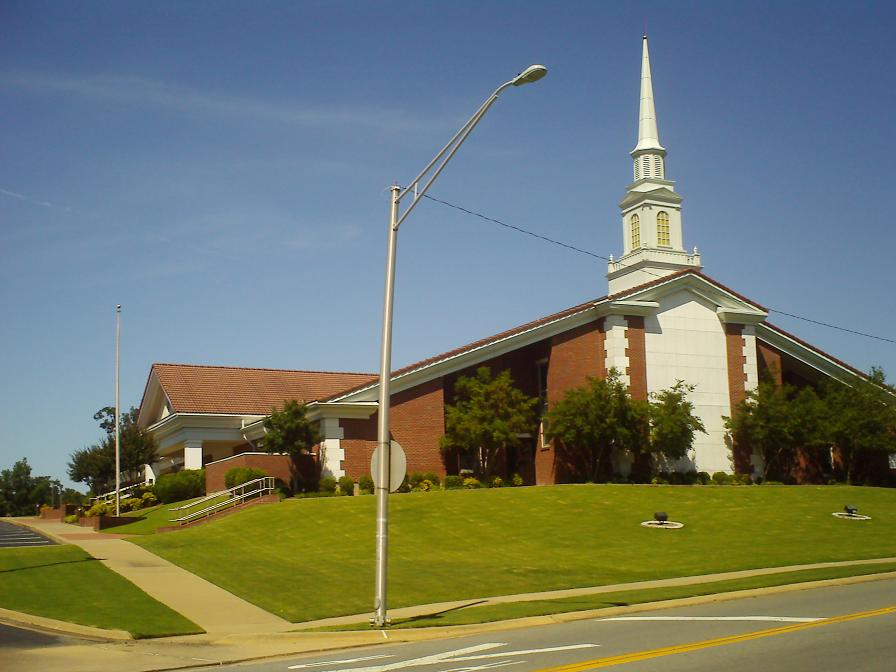
The North Little Rock Stake Center and home to the mission office for the Arkansas Little Rock Mission

Stake	Organized	Mission	Temple district
Bentonville Arkansas	October 26, 2014	Arkansas Bentonville	Bentonville Arkansas
Branson Missouri	April 27, 2025	Arkansas Bentonville	Bentonville Arkansas
Centerton Arkansas	September 14, 2025	Arkansas Bentonville	Bentonville Arkansas
Fort Smith Arkansas	April 30, 1978	Arkansas Bentonville	Bentonville Arkansas
Little Rock Arkansas	June 1, 1969	Arkansas Little Rock	Memphis Tennessee
Memphis Tennessee North	Sep. 14, 1980	Arkansas Little Rock	Memphis Tennessee
Monroe Louisiana	Aug. 18, 1985	Mississippi Jackson	Baton Rouge Louisiana
North Little Rock Arkansas	June 19, 1983	Arkansas Little Rock	Memphis Tennessee
Rogers Arkansas	August 11, 1991	Arkansas Bentonville	Bentonville Arkansas
Searcy Arkansas	January 26, 2014	Arkansas Little Rock	Memphis Tennessee
Shreveport Louisiana	Jan. 26, 1958	Mississippi Jackson	Dallas Texas
Springdale Arkansas	June 4, 2006	Arkansas Bentonville	Bentonville Arkansas
West Plains Missouri	Nov. 24, 2013	Arkansas Bentonville	St. Louis Missouri

- The Arkansas Stake was renamed the Little Rock Arkansas Stake.
- The Jacksonville Arkansas Stake was renamed the North Little Rock Arkansas stake when the stake center was moved to North Little Rock.
- The stake center for the Searcy Arkansas Stake is located in Jacksonville.

== Missions ==
Arkansas formed part of several church missions. Originally a conference of the Southern States Mission, it later became part of the Indian Territory Mission. Southwestern States Mission, Central States Mission, Texas-Louisiana Mission, Gulf States Mission, and ultimately the Arkansas Little Rock Mission formed in 1975 with Richard M. Richards as president.

The northwest part of the state is in the Arkansas Bentonville Mission, renamed in 2015 from the Oklahoma Tulsa Mission. The far south and southwest parts of the state are in the Mississippi Jackson Mission and the Texas Dallas Mission respectively.

== Temples ==
On October 5, 2019, the Bentonville Arkansas Temple was announced by President Russell M. Nelson and is the first to be built in Arkansas. As of July 2022, Arkansas is primarily in the Memphis, Kansas City, and Oklahoma City temple districts with some congregations in the Dallas, St. Louis, and Baton Rouge temple districts.

181. Bentonville Arkansas Temple; Official website; News & images	
Location: Announced: Groundbreaking: Dedicated: Size:	Bentonville, Arkansas, United States; 5 October 2019 by Russell M. Nelson; 7 November 2020 by David A. Bednar; 17 September 2023 by David A. Bednar; 28,472 sq ft (2,645.1 m^{2}) on a 18.62-acre (7.54 ha) site

== Growth rate and projections ==
The Church of Jesus Christ of Latter-day Saints continues to experience steady growth despite recent slowing rates of Latter-day Saints in the United States. It has slowly over time went from being .36% of the state's population to being 1.22% today with a projected 1.55% by 2050.

Membership numbers continue to steadily climb with it being projected to be over 50,000 members by the late 2030's to early 2050's. (Depending on the continued speed of growth) In comparing the LDS growth rate with Arkansas population overall growth rate it stands to reason that the Church of Jesus Christ of Latter-day Saints will continue to be a bigger part of Arkansas in every form of life.

According the Association of Religion Data Archives(ARDA) 2020 census data the Church of Jesus Christ of Latter-day Saints sits at the 9th largest Christian Church in Arkansas behind those such as the Southern Baptist Convention (SBC 607k members), Non-denominational (248k), Roman Catholics (153k), United Methodist (134k), National Missionary Baptist Convention of America (NMBCA 109k), Churches of Christ (CoC 79k), Assemblies of God (AoG 69k), American Baptism Association (ABA 52k).

Using the ARDA 2010 census data we can see the growth rates of the members of these larger Christian Churches. The largest SBC lost 54,000 members from 2010 to 2020, Non-denominational had an increase of 119k, Catholics also increased by 31k, Methodist lost 24k members, NMBCA gained 100k, Churches of Christ lost 5k members, AoG had a slight growth of 1k, and lastly ABA lost 28k members. Out of the larger churches only three experienced very good growth rates that do outpace the Church. Latter-day Saints in the same time grew 5,000 (and already another 5,000 from 2020 to 2025 from the Church's statistical reports) and went up from 10th to 9th largest church taking the spot where the African Methodist Episcopal Church was.

If the trend continues it would be expected for Latter-day Saints could potentially out pace ABA, AoG, and Churches of Christ in the next 10 to 20 years becoming the 6th largest Christian church in the state of Arkansas. It may have already outpaced the American Baptist Association with it rapidly losing membership, making the Church of Jesus Christ of Latter-day Saints likely already the 8th largest.

== Significant members who lived in Arkansas ==
- Elder David A. Bednar is a former associate dean of Graduate Studies in the College of Business Administration at the University of Arkansas. While at the University of Arkansas, he served as a stake president for the Fort Smith Arkansas Stake and then for the Rogers Stake. He later became the president for Ricks College in Idaho and ultimately was sustained a member of the Quorum of the Twelve Apostles in 2004.
- Amy Daniel of the Benton Ward, Little Rock Arkansas Stake, is a former president of the Arkansas School Boards Association.
- Dottie Zimmerman, then 24, of the Ash Flat Branch, North Little Rock Arkansas Stake, received three bronze medals in powerlifting at the 2003 Special Olympics World Summer Games in Dublin, Ireland, June 16–29, 2003. She had been trained in the bench press, deadlift and combination-bench and deadlift. Her team spent four days in Belfast before traveling to Dublin for the opening of the games. Zimmerman completed earlier that year in the Arkansas Special Olympics in Searcy, Arkansas, at which she received three gold medals.
- Robert L. Hall, CEC, of the Morrilton Ward, North Little Rock Arkansas Stake, served as a chef garde manger at the International Broadcast Center during the 2008 Summer Olympic Games in Beijing, China, May-August, 2008. Hall, former Executive Chef of the University of Central Arkansas, Culinary Director for the University of Arkansas System, Winthrop Rockefeller Institute on Petit Jean Mountain, Morrilton, Arkansas.
- Elder Taniela B. Wakolo, of Fiji, served as president of the Arkansas Little Rock Mission from July 2014 to June 2017. During the April 2017 General Conference, he was sustained as a General Authority of the Church.
- Elder Michael V. Beheshti, of Little Rock, was sustained as an Area Seventy of the Church of Jesus Christ of Latter-day Saints at General Conference on April 22, 2016. He serves in the North America Southeast Area.
- Elder David J. Harris, of Siloam Springs, Arkansas, was sustained as an Area Seventy of the Church of Jesus Christ of Latter-day Saints at General Conference on March 31, 2018. He serves in the North America Southwest Area.

== See also ==
- The Church of Jesus Christ of Latter-day Saints membership statistics (United States)
