= Bentonville Arkansas Temple =

Latter-day Saint Temple in Arkansas

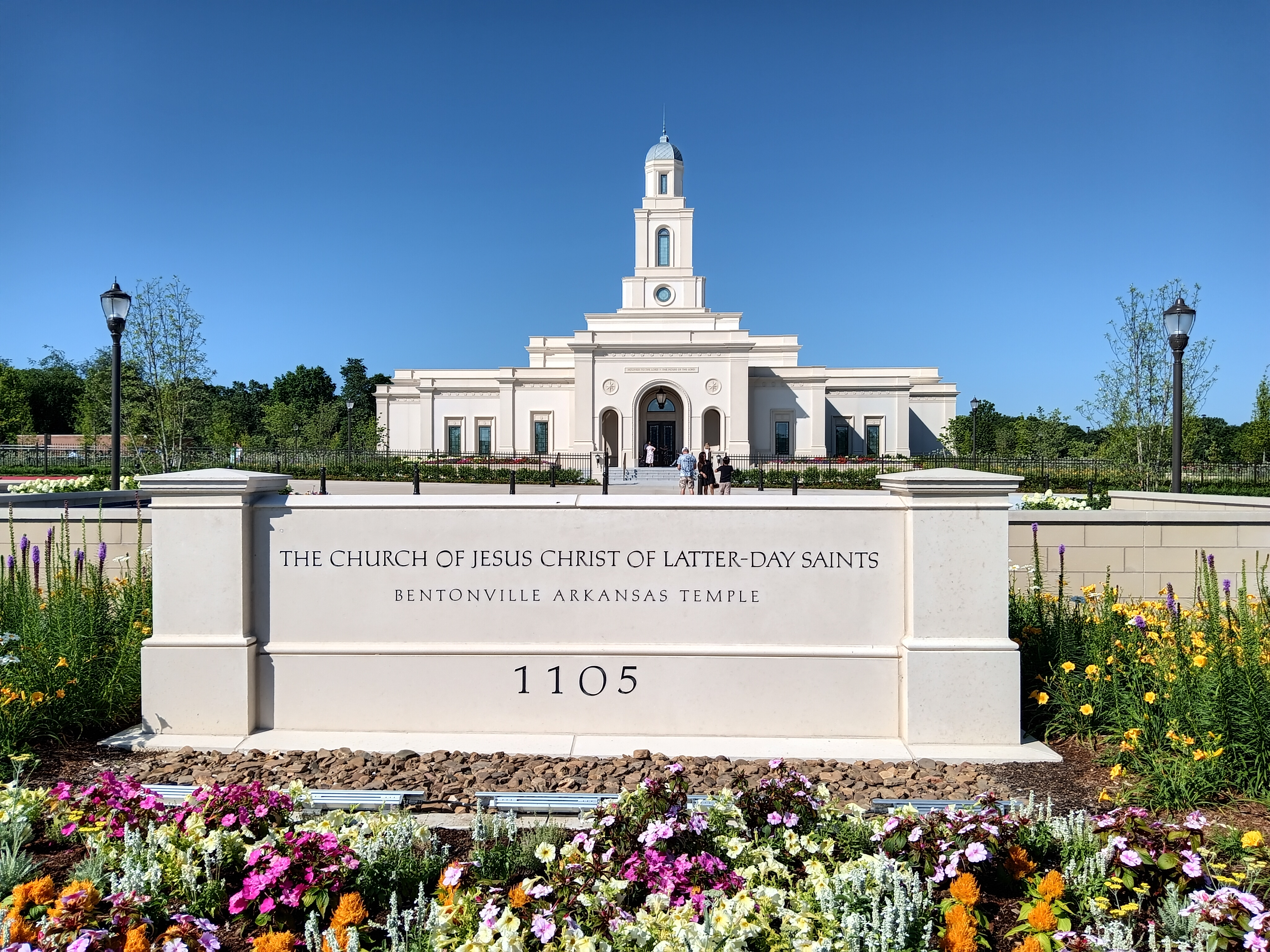
- The Bentonville Arkansas Temple during open house
- Interactive map of Bentonville Arkansas Temple
- Number: 181
- Dedication: 17 September 2023, by David A. Bednar
- Site: 18.62 acres (7.54 ha)
- Floor area: 28,472 ft^{2} (2,645.1 m^{2})
- Height: 111.67 ft (34.04 m)
- Official website • News & images

Church chronology
← Brasília Brazil Temple	Bentonville Arkansas Temple	→ Moses Lake Washington Temple

Additional information
- Announced: 5 October 2019, by Russell M. Nelson
- Groundbreaking: 7 November 2020, by David A. Bednar
- Open house: 17 June-1 July 2023
- Current president: David Owen Stout
- Location: Bentonville, Arkansas, United States
- Coordinates: 36.3851°N 94.1830°W
- Baptistries: 1
- Ordinance rooms: 2
- Sealing rooms: 2

The Bentonville Arkansas Temple is a temple of the Church of Jesus Christ of Latter-day Saints (LDS Church) located in Bentonville, Arkansas. The intent to build the temple was announced on October 5, 2019, by church president Russell M. Nelson, during general conference. It is the LDS Church's first temple in the state of Arkansas, and the 181st in operation worldwide. A groundbreaking ceremony, to signify the beginning of construction, was held on November 7, 2020, conducted by David A. Bednar, of the Quorum of the Twelve Apostles.

== History ==
On October 5, 2019, during general conference, church president Russell M. Nelson announced plans to construct the Bentonville Arkansas Temple. The temple's location was announced on April 23, 2020, adjacent to a current meetinghouse on McCollum Drive.

On August 28, 2020, the LDS Church released a rendering of the temple and announced that a groundbreaking ceremony would be held in November 2020, with David A. Bednar, a member of the Quorum of the Twelve Apostles, presiding remotely at the event. The groundbreaking took place on November 7, 2020, the same date on which ground was broken for the Red Cliffs Utah Temple. The temple was dedicated by Bednar on September 17, 2023.

== Design and architecture ==
The temple's architecture reflects the cultural heritage of the Bentonville region and its spiritual significance to the church. The design was inspired by local historical buildings, including “the neoclassical Benton County Courthouse, the colonial-revival-style Massey Hotel and the Arkansas State Capitol in Little Rock.”

The temple sits on an 18.62-acre lot. The site is located near I-49, close to its junction with Highway 72. The landscaping around the temple features dogwood trees, as well as other local trees and shrubs.

The temple has a single attached domed central tower and is constructed with beige precast concrete panels. The exterior has art glass windows with dogwood blossoms, sunbursts, and diamond designs.

The interior has painting and area rugs centered around a color palette of soft blues, greens, golds, and pink. The interior painting “includes several patterns reminiscent of quilting and lace tatting to evoke Bentonville’s small-town American feel.” The interior also contains art glass with the same quilt-like red, yellow, and blue designs as the exterior art glass. The temple includes two instruction rooms, two sealing rooms, and a baptistry, each arranged for ceremonial use.

The design has elements representing the heritage of the Bentonville area, providing spiritual meaning to the temple's appearance and function. Symbolism is important to church members and includes the diamond patterns found throughout the temple’s interior and exterior, which are a nod to the diamond mine in Arkansas, the only diamond mine in the United States. Another symbolic element is the dogwood flower motif; dogwood flowers are among Arkansas’ first springtime flowers.

== Temple presidents ==
The church's temples are directed by a temple president and matron, each serving for a term of three years. The president and matron oversee the administration of temple operations and provide guidance and training for both temple patrons and staff. Since its 2023 dedication, Scott B. Clark and Sandra G. Clark are the president and matron.

== Admittance ==
Following the completion of the temple, a public open house was held from June 17-July 1, 2023 (excluding Sundays). The temple was dedicated by David A. Bednar on September 17, 2023.

Like all the church's temples, it is not used for Sunday worship services. To members of the church, temples are regarded as sacred houses of the Lord. Once dedicated, only church members with a current temple recommend can enter for worship.

== See also ==
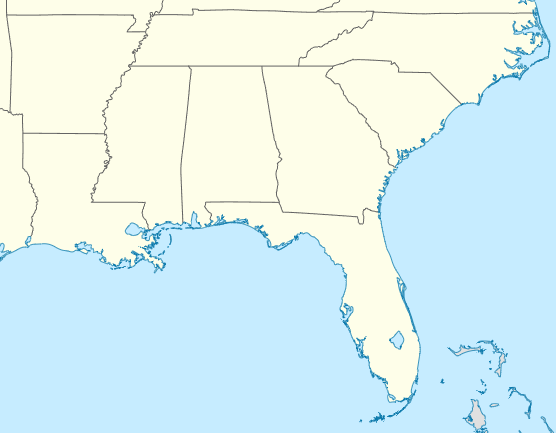
Temples in the Southeastern United States
- = Operating
- = Under construction
- = Announced
- = Temporarily Closed
- The Church of Jesus Christ of Latter-day Saints in Arkansas
- Comparison of temples of The Church of Jesus Christ of Latter-day Saints
- List of temples of The Church of Jesus Christ of Latter-day Saints
- List of temples of The Church of Jesus Christ of Latter-day Saints by geographic region
- Temple architecture (Latter-day Saints)
