= Billings Montana Temple =

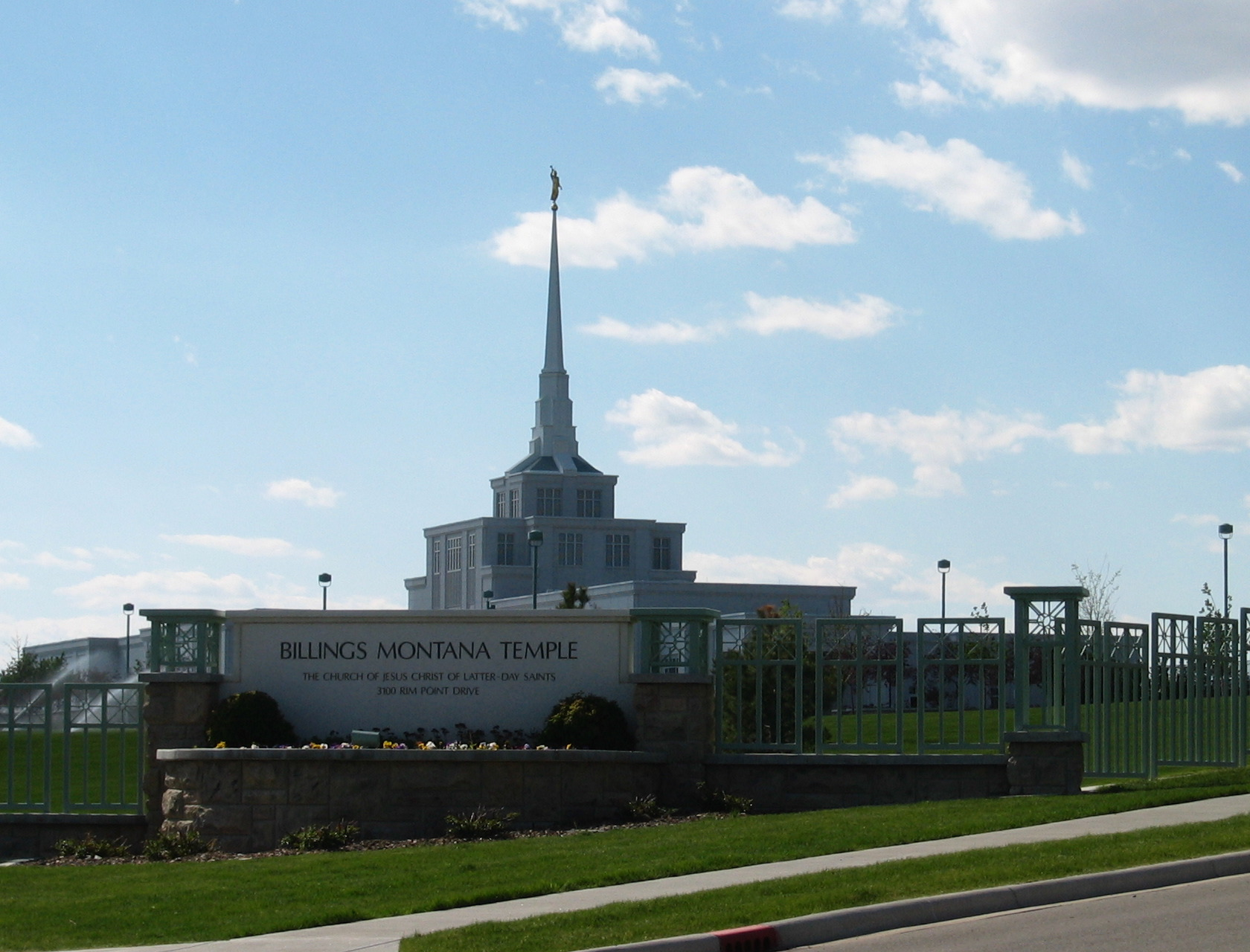
- Interactive map of Billings Montana Temple
- Number: 66
- Dedication: November 20, 1999, by Gordon B. Hinckley
- Site: 10 acres (4.0 ha)
- Floor area: 33,800 ft^{2} (3,140 m^{2})
- Height: 120 ft (37 m)
- Official website • News & images

Church chronology
| ← Regina Saskatchewan Temple | Billings Montana Temple | → Edmonton Alberta Temple |

Additional information
- Announced: August 30, 1996, by Gordon B. Hinckley
- Groundbreaking: March 30, 1998, by Hugh W. Pinnock
- Open house: October 8–23, 1999
- Current president: Bradley R. Wilde
- Designed by: CTA Architects Engineers
- Location: Billings, Montana, United States
- Coordinates: 45°48′1.818000″N 108°38′21.80400″W
- Exterior finish: Wyoming white dolomite precast concrete
- Design: Classic modern, single-spire design
- Baptistries: 1
- Ordinance rooms: 2 (two-stage progressive)
- Sealing rooms: 3
- Clothing rental: Yes

The Billings Montana Temple is the 66th operating temple of the Church of Jesus Christ of Latter-day Saints, and is located in Billings, Montana, United States. The intent to construct the temple was announced on August 16, 1996, by church president Gordon B. Hinckley. It was the first temple constructed in the state and serves church members in Montana and northern Wyoming.

Located on a 10-acre site atop the Rimrocks, a 300-foot sandstone cliff formation, the temple overlooks the Yellowstone River Valley. Designed by CTA Architects Engineers, the building features a single spire rising from a tiered tower, constructed with Wyoming white dolomite. Its 33,800-square-foot interior includes two ordinance rooms, three sealing rooms, and a baptistry.

A groundbreaking ceremony was held on March 30, 1998, and Hugh W. Pinnock, a church general authority, presiding. After construction was completed, a public open house was held from October 8 to 23, 1999, the temple was dedicated by Hinckley on November 20–21, 1999, in eight sessions.

== History ==
The Billings Montana Temple was announced by church president Gordon B. Hinckley on August 16, 1996. On March 30, 1998, the church announced it would be built on a 10-acre (4.0 ha) property at 3100 Rim Point Drive, and would be more than 33,800 square feet.

The groundbreaking ceremony took place on March 28, 1998, presided over by Hugh W. Pinnock, then president of the church’s North America Central Area (LDS Church). Despite a spring snowstorm, more than 4,800 church members from two Canadian provinces and 12 states gathered for the occasion.

On November 12, 1998, a gold-leafed, east facing statue of the angel Moroni was placed on top of the temple’s spire. Following construction, a public open house was held from October 8 to October 23, 1999, with 68,450 visitors to the temple. The temple was dedicated on November 20–21, 1999, by Gordon B. Hinckley in eight sessions, with 12,000 members participating.

In 2020, like all the church's others, the Billings Montana Temple was closed for a time in response to the COVID-19 pandemic.

== Design and architecture ==
The Billings Montana Temple was built in a “classic modern” design style and was designed by CTA Architects Engineers. The temple is on a 10-acre plot on top of the Rimrocks, with views of Billings and the Yellowstone River Valley. Landscaping includes lawns, floral gardens, over 250 trees and 4,500 shrubs, with retaining walls and fencing color-matched to the cliffside.

The temple is 183 feet by 212 feet, and the exterior uses Wyoming white dolomite, with a tan sandstone finish. When it is lit at night, the temple can be seen for miles. A tiered tower with louvered vents supports a gold-leafed statue of the angel Moroni, while a stained-glass bay window on the west side adds a distinctive feature. A skylight inside the temple also offers a view of the angel Moroni statue.

The temple is 33,800 square feet and includes two ordinance rooms, three sealing rooms, and a baptistry. Additional facilities include a brides’ room, clothing rental, and waiting areas, with rooms compacted in ways not done by previous, larger temples.

== Cultural and community impact ==
During its public open house in 1999, the temple welcomed approximately 68,450 visitors, including many from other faiths and civic leadership. Others who toured the building included those who contributed to construction of the temple, local clergy, teachers, media staff, business people, local residents from nearby homes, and government and community leaders, including the governor of Montana, and the mayor of Billings.

According to the Billings Gazette, although the temple originally drew public criticism for not belonging in a residential area, with “neatly manicured grounds” now gets very little negative feedback. Visits from members visiting the temple boosts the local economy.

According to a report by Cowboy State Daily, construction of the temple significantly boosted surrounding property values and reshaped nearby neighborhoods. Initially, the project faced opposition due to concerns over lighting, traffic, and the height of the steeple, but these concerns largely diminished over time. An unnamed resident attempting to buy a home in the area later acknowledged that the temple’s impact on daily life was minimal and that the building was well-maintained and visually appealing. The temple helped drive development in the area, with an estimated 1,500 to 2,000 homes constructed nearby following its completion, many of which now rank among the city's most expensive properties.

== Temple presidents and admittance ==
The church's temples are directed by a temple president and matron, each typically serving for a term of three years. The president and matron oversee the administration of temple operations and provide guidance and training for both temple patrons and staff.

Serving from 1999 to 2002, Stanley Stott was the first president, Beverly J Stone Stott serving as matron. As of 2024, Bradley R. Wilde is the president, with Debra L. Wilde serving as matron.

On August 21, 1999, the public open house held from October 8–23, 1999 (excluding Sundays) as announced. The temple was dedicated by Gordon B. Hinckley on November 20–21, 1999, in eight sessions.

Like all the church's temples, it is not used for Sunday worship services. To members of the church, temples are regarded as sacred houses of the Lord. Once dedicated, only church members with a current temple recommend can enter for worship.

== See also ==

Temples in Montana

- = Operating
- = Under construction
- = Announced
- = Temporarily Closed

- The Church of Jesus Christ of Latter-day Saints in Montana
- Comparison of temples of The Church of Jesus Christ of Latter-day Saints
- List of temples of The Church of Jesus Christ of Latter-day Saints
- List of temples of The Church of Jesus Christ of Latter-day Saints by geographic region
- Temple architecture (Latter-day Saints)

== Additional reading ==
- "Go-ahead given for Montana temple", Church News, November 1, 1997
- "Statue placed atop temple in Billings", Church News, November 21, 1998
- Kruckenberg, Janet (October 16, 1999), "Big Sky Country splendor graces open house tours", Church News
- Olp, Susan (October 30, 2004), "Neighbors learn to live with familiar landmark", Billings Gazette
- Olp, Susan (October 30, 2004), "Drawn to the Temple: 5 years after it opened, LDS temple attracts people, business", Billings Gazette
