= Modesto California Temple =

- Dedication scheduled
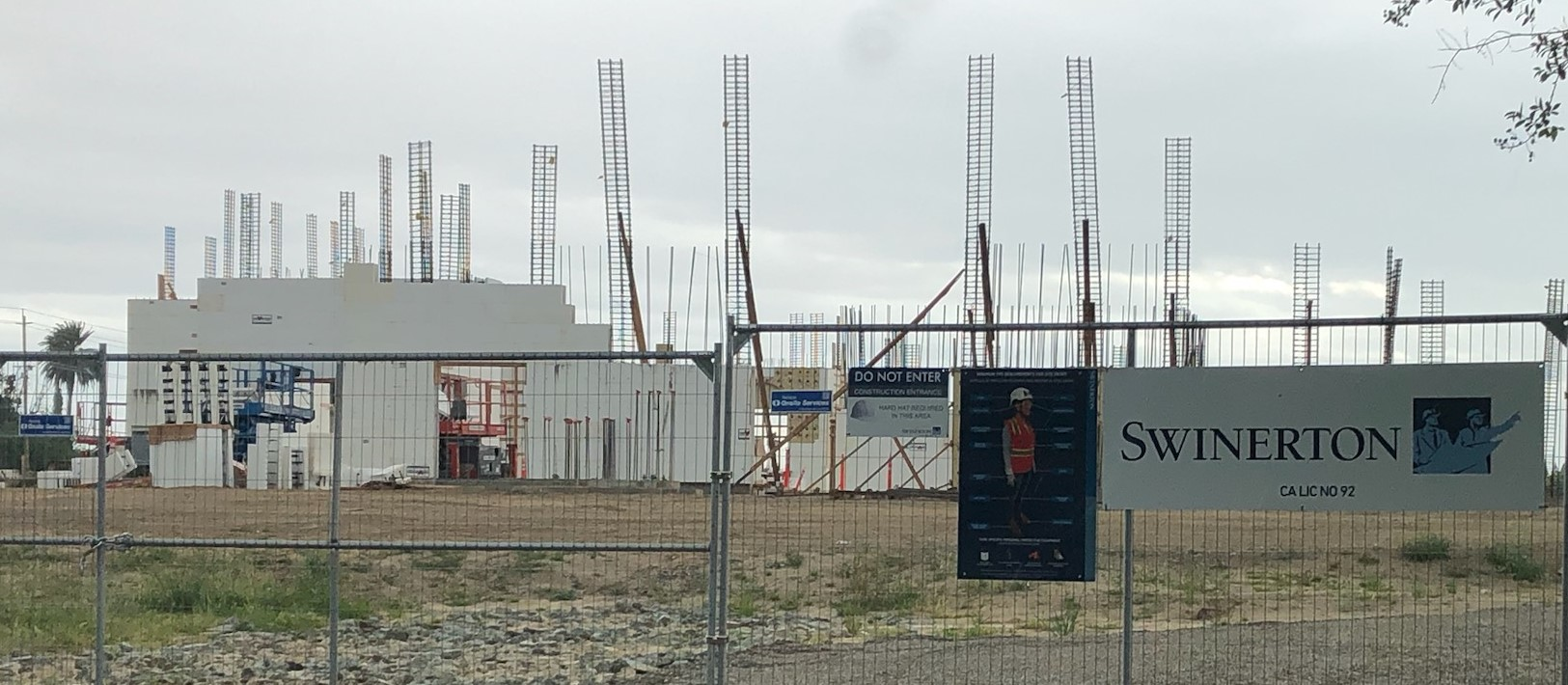
- Interactive map of Modesto California Temple
- Number: 231
- Dedication: 22 November 2026, by Quentin L. Cook
- Site: 17.63 acres (7.13 ha)
- Floor area: 31,352 ft^{2} (2,912.7 m^{2})
- Official website • News & images

Additional information
- Announced: 3 April 2022, by Russell M. Nelson
- Groundbreaking: 7 October 2023, by Gary B. Sabin
- Open house: 16-31 October 2026
- Current president: David Lewis White
- Location: Modesto, California
- Coordinates: 37°42′09″N 121°02′52″W
- Baptistries: 1
- Ordinance rooms: 2
- Sealing rooms: 2

The Modesto California Temple is a temple of the Church of Jesus Christ of Latter-day Saints awaiting dedication in Modesto, California. The intent to build the temple was announced by church president Russell M. Nelson on April 3, 2022, during general conference. It will be the church's tenth temple in California. It is a single-story building with an attached central tower. A groundbreaking ceremony, marking the beginning of construction, was held on October 7, 2023, with Gary B. Sabin, a church general authority, presiding. A public open house is scheduled from October 16 to 31, 2026, excluding Sundays, before its dedication on November 22, 2026 by Quentin L. Cook of the Quorum of the Twelve Apostles.

== History ==
The intent to construct the Modesto California Temple was announced by church president Russell M. Nelson on April 3, 2022, during general conference. It was the 100th temple announced by Nelson. It is located near the site of New Hope, an unsuccessful Latter-day Saint settlement established in the area of present-day Caswell Memorial State Park during 1846 and 1847. A group sent by Sam Brannan and led by William Stout cleared fields and planted crops along the lower Stanislaus River, but flooding during the winter of 1846–47 brought the settlement to an end.

An exterior rendering of the temple was released on December 19, 2022. In February 2023, the church held a community meeting at the adjacent meetinghouse, where attendees viewed renderings of the proposed building and asked project directors questions about the plans.

On October 7, 2023, a groundbreaking ceremony was held marking the beginning of construction. Gary B. Sabin, a general authority and first counselor in the presidency of the church's North America West Area, presided over the ceremony. Attendance was by invitation, and guests included local religious, government, and civic leaders. On December 19, 2024, construction crews had installed the final section of the tower. In August 2025, the temple’s capstone was placed.

With construction complete, a public open house is scheduled from October 16 to 31, 2026, excluding Sundays, following media visits and tours for invited guests. The temple is scheduled to be dedicated on November 22, 2026, by Quentin L. Cook of the Quorum of the Twelve Apostles. David L. White and Cynthia L. White have been called to serve as the president and matron.

Before the Modesto temple was announced, Latter-day Saints in the area traveled to temples in Oakland, Fresno, and Sacramento. The new temple is expected to serve members in the Northern San Joaquin Valley, including communities such as Manteca, Ripon, Lathrop, and Tracy. It is one of 12 temples announced in California, a state with nearly 730,000 Latter-day Saints, according to the church.

== Design and architecture ==
The Modesto California Temple is located on a 17.63-acre site at 4300 Dale Road in Modesto, adjacent to an existing meetinghouse. Before construction, the property was used for outdoor sports and included a pavilion. The temple is a single-story building of approximately 30,000 square feet, with a central tower topped by a small dome. The tower has four elongated arched windows with stained glass panels. In March 2023, the Modesto Board of Zoning Adjustment approved a proposed 115-foot spire, which exceeded the usual zoning height limit by 50 feet. A large arch frames the entrance, which faces a spacious courtyard. The surrounding grounds include grassy areas and flower gardens. The temple contains two instruction rooms, two sealing rooms, and a baptistry.

== See also ==
Temples in California
Los Angeles Temples
Temples in the Los Angeles metropolitan
area
- = Operating
- = Under construction
- = Announced
- = Temporarily closed

- Comparison of temples (LDS Church)
- List of temples (LDS Church)
- List of temples by geographic region (LDS Church)
- Temple architecture (LDS Church)
- The Church of Jesus Christ of Latter-day Saints in California
