= Yorba Linda California Temple =

LDS Church temple in California, United States

- Interactive map of Yorba Linda California Temple
- Number: 219
- Dedication: 7 June 2026, by D. Todd Christofferson
- Site: 5.46 acres (2.21 ha)
- Floor area: 30,872 ft^{2} (2,868.1 m^{2})
- Official website • News & images

Additional information
- Announced: 4 April 2021, by Russell M. Nelson
- Groundbreaking: 18 June 2022, by Mark A. Bragg
- Open house: 30 April-20 May 2026
- Current president: R. Wyatt Powell
- Location: Yorba Linda, California, United States
- Coordinates: 33°53′52″N 117°50′05″W
- Baptistries: 1
- Ordinance rooms: 2
- Sealing rooms: 2

The Yorba Linda California Temple is a temple of the Church of Jesus Christ of Latter-day Saints in Yorba Linda, California. Announced in April 2021 by church president Russell M. Nelson, it serves approximately 21,000 church members and was dedicated on June 7, 2026 by D. Todd Christofferson, second counselor in the First Presidency. Located near the intersection of Bastanchury Road and Imperial Highway in northern Orange County, the temple was designed by HKS Architects and was built by Zwick Construction. The temple has a single spire rising above the main entrance, though the design was modified from an original rendering that featured a central spire to meet permitting and zoning requirements. It is the church's 9th temple in California and the second in Orange County, after the Newport Beach California Temple.

== History ==
The intent to build the Yorba Linda California Temple was announced by church president Russell M. Nelson on April 1, 2021, during general conference. On July 15, 2021, the church announced the site, near the intersection of Bastanchury Road and Nohl Ranch Road.

A groundbreaking ceremony was held on June 18, 2022, signifying the start of construction. The ceremony was attended by local church leaders and guests. In January 2026, the church announced the public open house that was held from April 30 to May 23, 2026, excluding Sundays.

The temple was dedicated on June 7, 2026, making this the fifth temple located in Southern California.

== Design and architecture ==
A rendering of the temple was released on September 17, 2021, which originally featured a central spire. An updated rendering was released on June 11, 2022, due to permitting and zoning requirements. The temple was designed by HKS Architects, and was built by Zwick Construction.

The temple is on a 5.4-acre landscaped site in Yorba Linda, a suburban community in northern Orange County. Approximately 21,000 church members live in the temple district, with 750,000 in California. The grounds have a series of flowers around a walkway leading up to the temple. It is a 30,000-square-foot, single-story temple that has a single spire above the main entrance. It includes two instruction rooms, two sealing rooms, and a baptistry.

== Temple leadership and admittance ==
The church's temples are directed by a temple president and matron, each typically serving for a term of three years. The president and matron oversee the administration of temple operations and provide guidance and training for both temple patrons and staff. In July 2025, the church announced the first president and matron of the temple will be Robert W. Powell and Lisa M. Powell.

After construction concluded, a public open house was held from April 30 to May 23, 2026 (excluding Sundays). Like all the church's temples, it is not used for Sunday worship services. To members of the church, temples are regarded as sacred houses of the Lord. Once dedicated, only church members with a current temple recommend can enter for worship.

== See also ==
Temples in California
Temples in the Los Angeles metropolitan
area
- = Operating
- = Under construction
- = Announced
- = Temporarily Closed

- The Church of Jesus Christ of Latter-day Saints in California
- Comparison of temples (LDS Church)
- List of temples (LDS Church)
- List of temples by geographic region (LDS Church)
- Religion in California
- Temple architecture (LDS Church)
