= Newport Beach California Temple =

LDS Church temple in Newport Beach, California

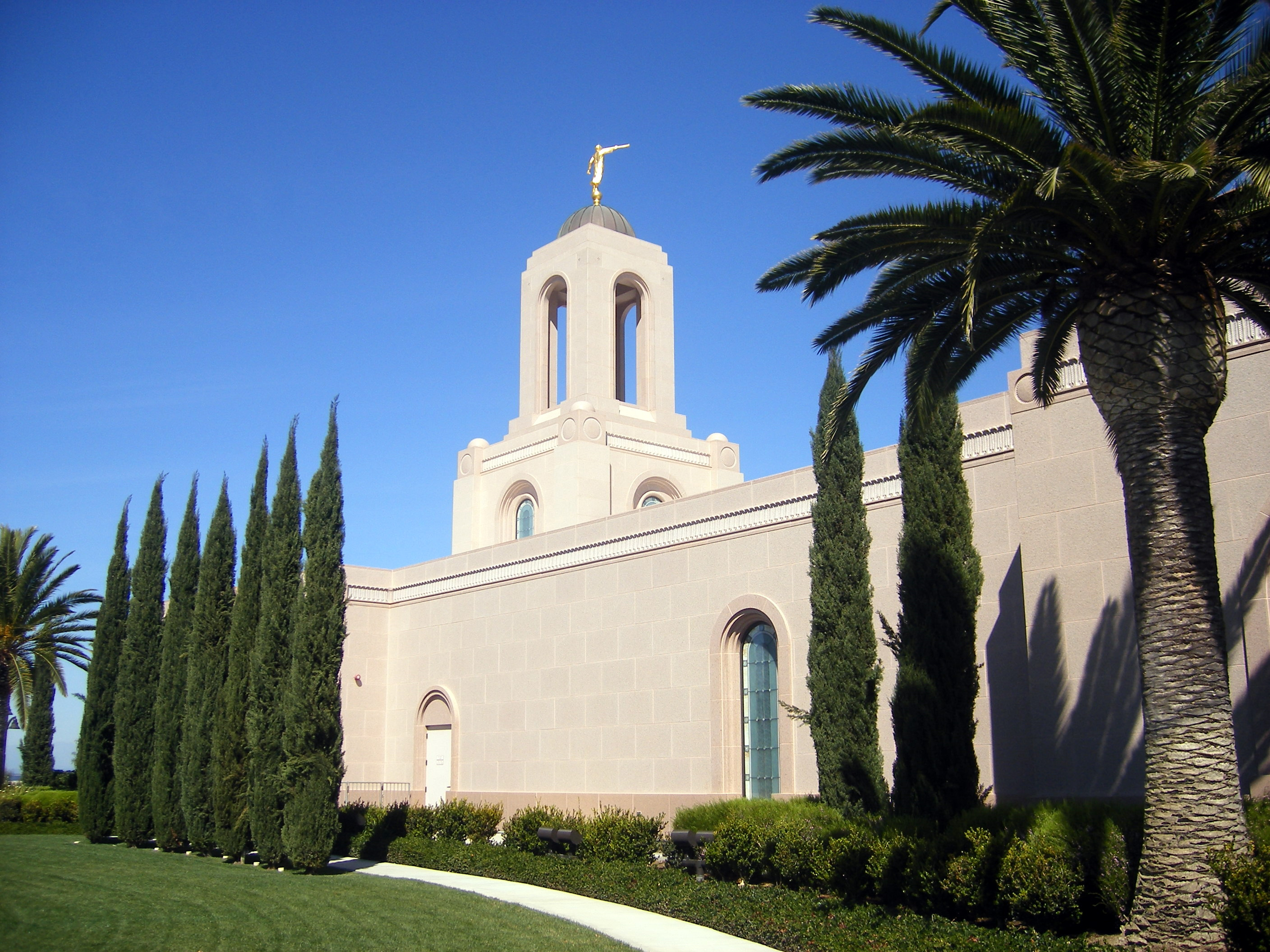
- Interactive map of Newport Beach California Temple
- Number: 122
- Dedication: August 28, 2005, by Gordon B. Hinckley
- Site: 8.8 acres (3.6 ha)
- Floor area: 17,800 ft^{2} (1,650 m^{2})
- Height: 90 ft (27 m)
- Official website • News & images

Church chronology
← Aba Nigeria Temple	Newport Beach California Temple	→ Sacramento California Temple

Additional information
- Announced: April 21, 2001, by Gordon B. Hinckley
- Groundbreaking: August 15, 2003, by Duane B. Gerrard
- Open house: July 23 – August 20, 2005
- Current president: Larry D Boberg
- Designed by: Lloyd Platt and Allen Erekson
- Location: Newport Beach, California, United States
- Coordinates: 33°37′46.0″N 117°50′56.0″W
- Exterior finish: Salisbury pink granite from North Carolina
- Design: Southern California traditional design
- Baptistries: 1
- Ordinance rooms: 2 (two-stage progressive)
- Sealing rooms: 3

The Newport Beach California Temple is a temple of the Church of Jesus Christ of Latter-day Saints in Newport Beach, California. The intent to build the temple was announced on April 21, 2001, by the church's First Presidency. The temple is the sixth in California.

The temple has a single attached tower with a statue of the angel Moroni. The temple was designed by Lloyd E. Platt Associates, Ralph Martin, and RNM Architects Planners, using a Southern California traditional architectural style. A groundbreaking ceremony, to signify the beginning of construction, was held on August 15, 2003, conducted by Duane B. Gerrard, a church general authority.

== History ==
This structure is the church's 122nd temple. It was announced on April 21, 2001, at the same as plans for new California temples in Sacramento and Redlands. The groundbreaking ceremony for the temple was on held on August 15, 2003, and was conducted by Duane B. Gerrard, first counselor in the presidency of the church's North America West Area. The temple was dedicated by church president Gordon B. Hinckley on August 28, 2005. At the time, it was the sixth operating temple in California. Prior to the dedication, approximately 175,000 people toured the building during a public open house. The open house was disrupted by a small group of protesters who carried signs reading "Mormon Lies Found Here" and "Jesus Warned Against False Prophets" and urged people not to enter. The temple was built to serve the 50,000 Latter-day Saints then living in Orange County.

Similar to the Redlands California Temple, it uses interior and exterior architectural themes consistent with those used in the Spanish missions of the early Western United States and Mexico. The interior includes murals of the California coast.

In response to opposition from residents of the surrounding community, the church made several modifications to the original design. The exterior was changed from white marble or granite to a pinker granite, considered more appropriate for Orange County. The steeple was lowered from 124 feet (38 m) to 90 feet (27 m), and the exterior lighting is turned off each night at 11 o'clock (unlike most temples, which are lit throughout the night).

The temple has a cupola on top which holds a statue of the angel Moroni. As with many contemporary temples of the church, this one is built on the grounds of an existing stake center and shares parking with it. The temple has a total of 17,800 square feet (1,650 m^{2}), two ordinance rooms, and three sealing rooms. It is located on an 8.8-acre site. The temple is located in eastern Newport Beach, on Bonita Canyon Road, at Prairie Drive, near California State Route 73.

== Design and architecture ==
The building has a Southern California traditional architectural style, and traditional Latter-day Saint temple design. Designed by Lloyd E. Platt Associates and Ralph Martin of RNM Architects Planners, its architecture uses both the cultural heritage of the Newport Beach region and its spiritual significance to the church.

The temple is on an 8.8-acre site, with surrounding landscaping that includes “water features, walkways, and various columnar, palm and other native trees.” The structure stands one story tall, constructed with Salisbury pink granite. The exterior resembles Californian early mission architecture with its arches and pink exterior.

The interior has “various pictures and paintings of Jesus Christ, as well as murals of the California coast in the instruction rooms.” The temple includes two ordinance rooms, three sealing rooms, and a baptistry, each designed for ceremonial use.

The design uses elements representing the history of California, to also provide deeper spiritual meaning to its appearance and function. Symbolism is important to church members, and include its exterior features, such as the cupola and the arches, representing the region’s historic architecture.

== Temple presidents ==
The church's temples are directed by a temple president and matron, each typically serving for a term of three years. The president and matron oversee the administration of temple operations and provide guidance and training for both temple patrons and staff.

Serving from 2005 to 2010, Stephen B. Oveson was the first president, with Dixie R. Oveson as matron. As of 2024, Larry D Boberg is the president, with Ava J. Boberg serving as matron.

== Admittance ==
On April 28, 2005, the church announced the public open house that was held from July 23 to August 20, 2005 (excluding Sundays). The temple was dedicated by Gordon B. Hinckley on August 28, 2005, in four sessions.

Like all the church's temples, it is not used for Sunday worship services. To members of the church, temples are regarded as sacred houses of the Lord. Once dedicated, only church members with a current temple recommend can enter for worship.

== Gallery ==
Exterior of Newport Beach California Temple, March 2015

Spire of Newport Beach California Temple, March 2015

== See also ==
Temples in the Los Angeles metropolitan
area
California Temples
Temples in California
- = Operating
- = Under construction
- = Announced
- = Temporarily Closed

- Comparison of temples (LDS Church)
- List of temples (LDS Church)
- List of temples by geographic region (LDS Church)
- Temple architecture (LDS Church)
- The Church of Jesus Christ of Latter-day Saints in California
