= Sacramento California Temple =

LDS temple

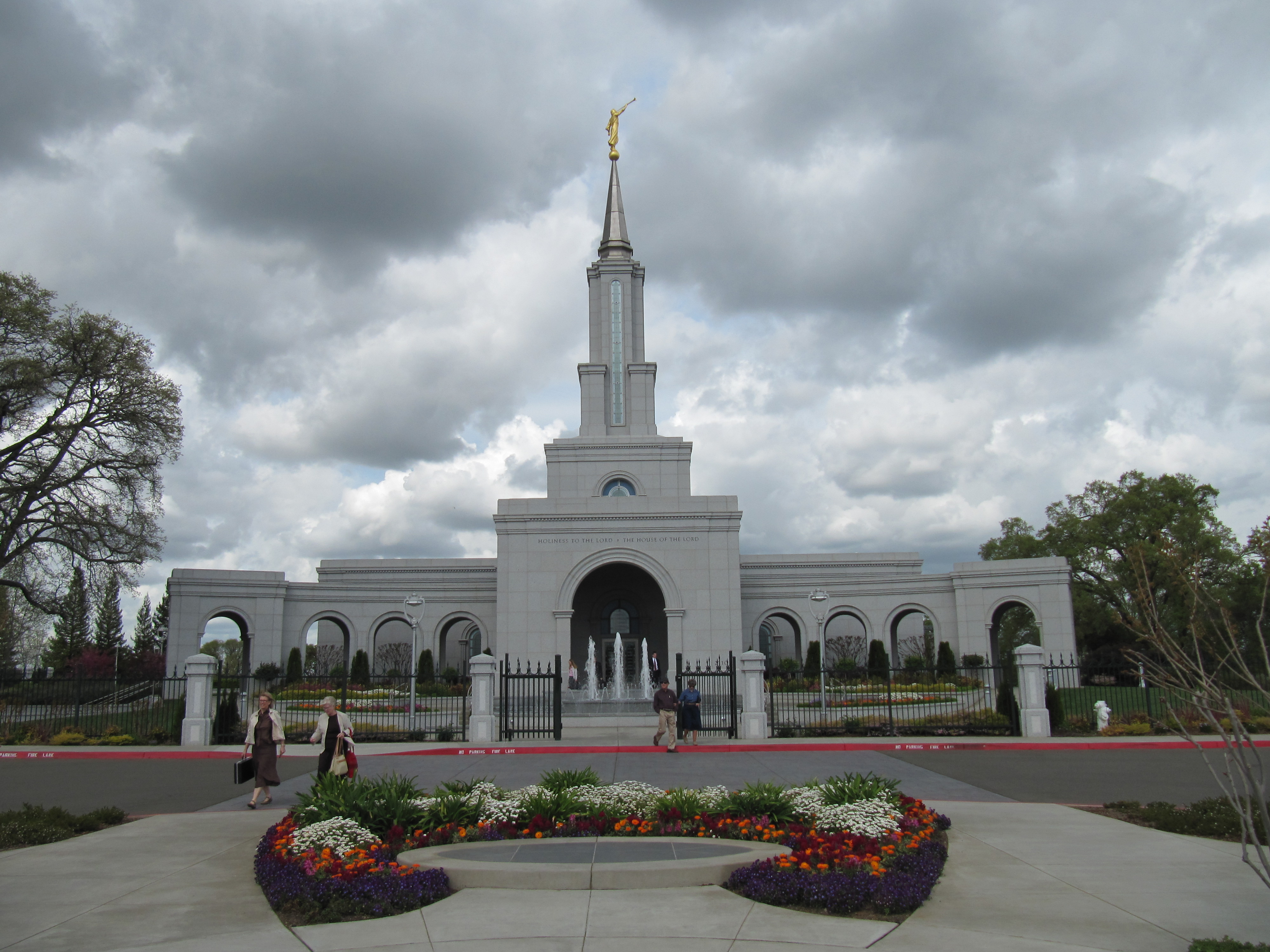
- Interactive map of Sacramento California Temple
- Number: 123
- Dedication: September 3, 2006, by Gordon B. Hinckley
- Site: 46 acres (19 ha)
- Floor area: 19,500 ft^{2} (1,810 m^{2})
- Height: 131 ft (40 m)
- Official website • News & images

Church chronology
← Newport Beach California Temple	Sacramento California Temple	→ Helsinki Finland Temple

Additional information
- Announced: April 21, 2001, by Gordon B. Hinckley
- Groundbreaking: August 22, 2004, by Gordon B. Hinckley
- Open house: July 29 – August 26, 2006
- Current president: Walter Robert (Terry) Baggs
- Designed by: Joseph Marty Architect, Brian Everett and Maury Maher
- Location: Rancho Cordova, California, U.S.
- Coordinates: 38°38′6.4″N 121°11′38.1″W
- Exterior finish: Light gray granite
- Design: Classic modern, single-spire design
- Baptistries: 1
- Ordinance rooms: 2 (two-stage progressive)
- Sealing rooms: 4

The Sacramento California Temple is the 123rd operating temple of the Church of Jesus Christ of Latter-day Saints. The intent to build the temple was announced in a news release by the First Presidency on April 21, 2001. The temple was the seventh built by the church in California, more than any state except Utah. The Sacramento California Temple serves a membership which totals approximately 80,000 in the area.

The temple has a single attached end spire with a statue of the angel Moroni. The temple was designed by Brian Everett and Maury Maher of Nichols, Melburg & Rossetto. A groundbreaking ceremony, to signify the beginning of construction, was held on August 22, 2004, conducted by Hinckley.

== History ==
On April 21, 2001, the church's First Presidency announced that temples in California would be built in the Sacramento, Redlands, and Newport Beach.

Plans for building the temple were met with little resistance by the surrounding communities and government bodies. Many were glad for planned building, because it would improve the land and bring visitors and money into the area. There was some concern about the height of the temple spire, and the church agreed to lower it 20 feet (6.1 m).

On August 22, 2004, a site dedication and groundbreaking ceremony were held. Church president Hinckley presided at the ceremony and gave the site dedication prayer. Other prominent church members from the area also attended the groundbreaking and site dedication, including Congressman John Doolittle. The site for the temple, located in Rancho Cordova, covers 46 acres (190,000 m^{2}) and includes views of the Sierra Nevada mountains. The temple grounds were designed to fit in with the surrounding landscape. Its design is slightly larger than most of the church's temples constructed at the same time. The temple has a total of 19,500 square feet (1,810 m^{2}), two ordinance rooms and four sealing rooms.

After construction was completed, a public open house was held from July 29 to August 26, 2006. Hinckley dedicated the temple on September 3, 2006. The dedication was done in four sessions and carried by feed to meetinghouses to allow all those who would like to attend the opportunity to participate. The night before the dedication, a cultural celebration was performed at ARCO Arena.

In 2018, a temple was announced in nearby Yuba City, California. In March 2020, like all the church's others, the Sacramento California Temple was closed for a time due to the COVID-19 pandemic.

== Design and architecture ==
The building has a classically elegant architectural style, coupled with a traditional Latter-day Saint temple design. Designed by Brian Everett and Maury Maher, its architecture reflects both the cultural heritage of Sacramento and its spiritual significance to the church.

The temple is on a 47-acre plot which “is set on a hill that overlooks the foothills of the Sierra Nevada Mountains and Lake Natoma.” The landscaping around the temple features walkways and water features, as well as trees, bushes, and flowers.

The structure stands 131 feet tall, and is constructed with temple white granite from Fuzhou, China. The exterior has arched colonnades on each side of the main entry.

The interior has “numerous art-glass windows, sculpted carpet and an original mural depicting the Sierra Nevada mountains and foothills.” The temple has a baptistry, two ordinance rooms, and four sealing rooms, each designed for ceremonial use.

The design has symbolic elements representing Latter-day Saint symbolism, to provide deeper spiritual meaning to the temple's appearance and function. Symbolism is important to church members and includes the twelve oxen which support the baptismal font, representing the twelve tribes of Israel.

== Temple presidents ==
The church's temples are directed by a temple president and matron, each serving for a term of three years. The president and matron oversee the administration of temple operations and provide guidance and training for both temple patrons and staff.

Serving from 2006 to 2009, the first president of the Sacramento California Temple was Richard H. Winkel, with Karen H. Winkel being the matron. As of 2024, Ned P. Telford is the president and Karen D. Telford is the matron.

== Admittance ==
Following the temple’s completion, the church announced held a public open house from July 29 to August 26, 2006 (excluding Sundays). The temple was dedicated by Gordon B. Hinckley on September 3, 2006, in four sessions.

Like all the church's temples, it is not used for Sunday worship services. To members of the church, temples are regarded as sacred houses of the Lord. Once dedicated, only church members with a current temple recommend can enter for worship.

== Gallery ==
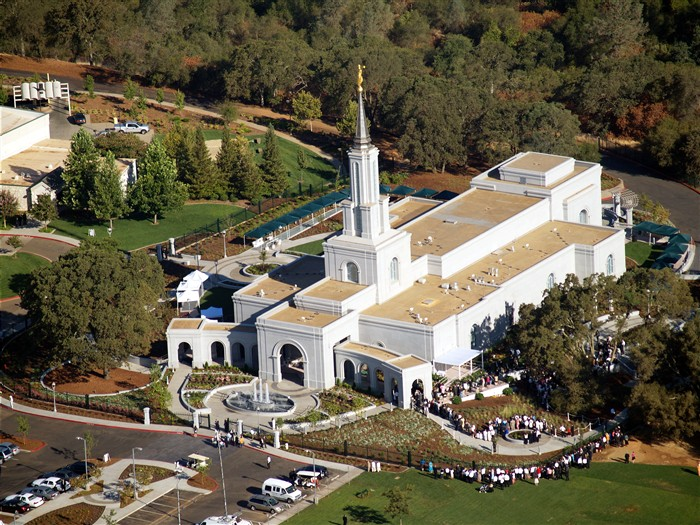
Aerial view of Sacramento temple during dedication on September 3, 2006

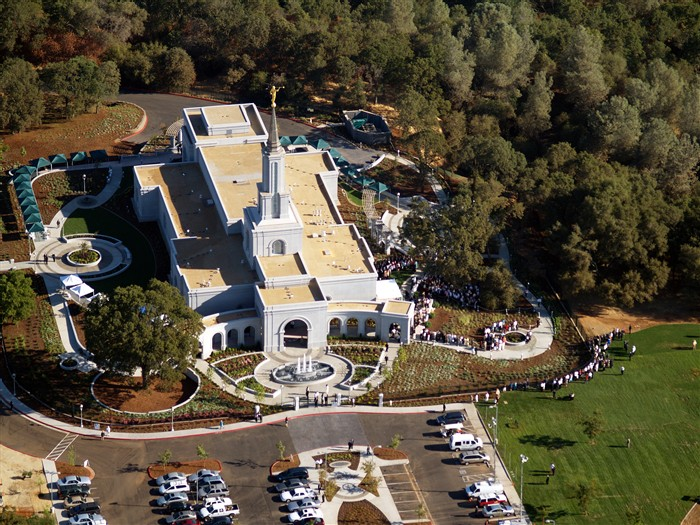
Aerial from the front

== See also ==
Temples in California
Los Angeles Temples
Temples in the Los Angeles metropolitan
area
- = Operating
- = Under construction
- = Announced
- = Temporarily closed

- William W. Parmley, former temple president
- Comparison of temples of The Church of Jesus Christ of Latter-day Saints
- List of temples of The Church of Jesus Christ of Latter-day Saints
- List of temples of The Church of Jesus Christ of Latter-day Saints by geographic region
- Temple architecture (LDS Church)
- The Church of Jesus Christ of Latter-day Saints in California
