= Helsinki Finland Temple =

LDS temple in Finland

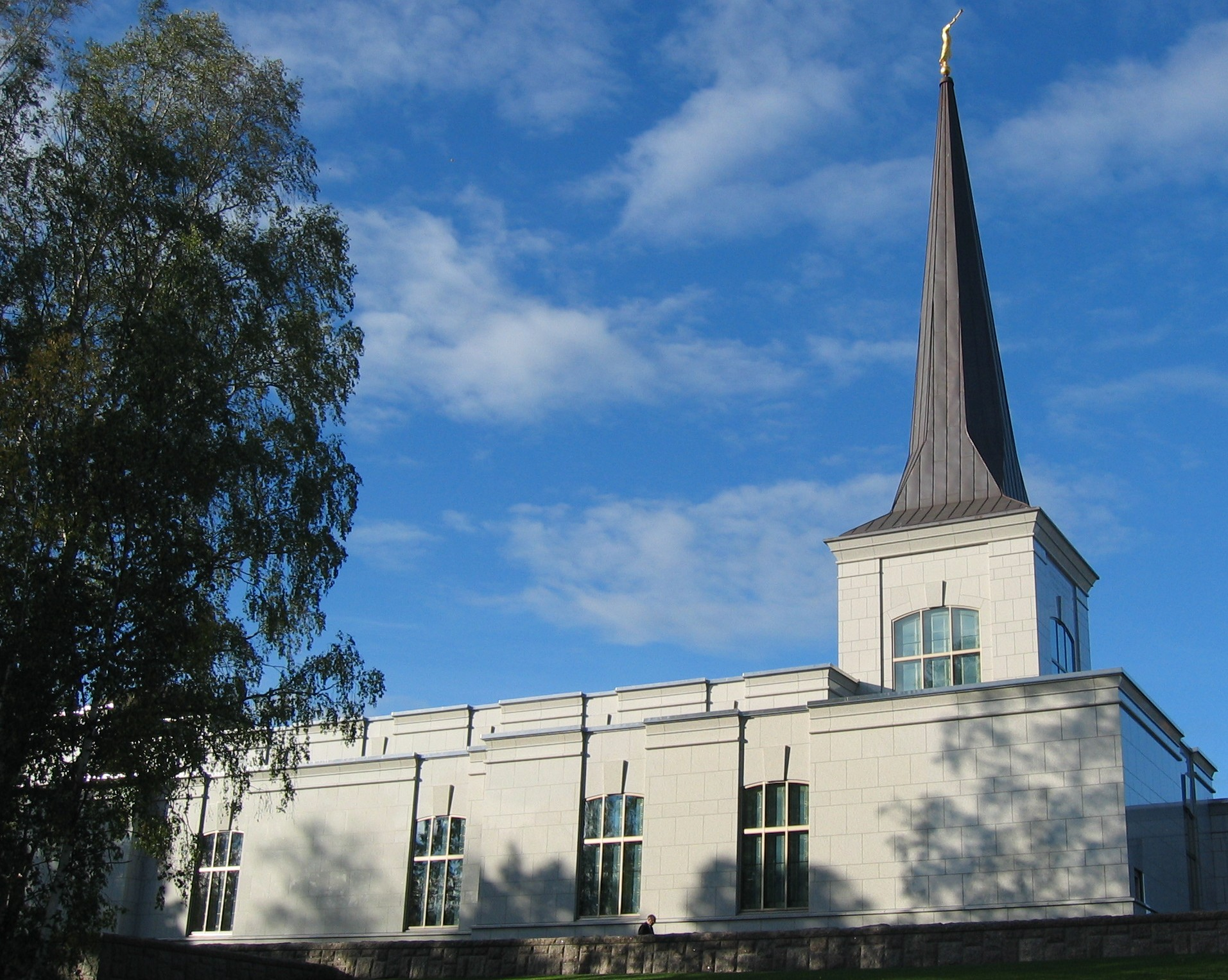
- Interactive map of Helsinki Finland Temple
- Number: 124
- Dedication: 22 October 2006, by Gordon B. Hinckley
- Site: 7.4 acres (3.0 ha)
- Floor area: 16,350 ft^{2} (1,519 m^{2})
- Height: 139 ft (42 m)
- Official website • News & images

Church chronology
← Sacramento California Temple	Helsinki Finland Temple	→ Rexburg Idaho Temple

Additional information
- Announced: 2 April 2000, by Gordon B. Hinckley
- Groundbreaking: 29 March 2003, by D. Lee Tobler
- Open house: 21 September – 7 October 2006
- Current president: Ville Kervinen
- Designed by: Evata Architects
- Location: Espoo, Finland
- Coordinates: 60°13′30.69479″N 24°46′54.42599″E
- Exterior finish: Light gray Italian granite and Finnish brown granite (stone walls surrounding temple)
- Design: Classic elegance, single-spire design
- Baptistries: 1
- Ordinance rooms: 2 (two-stage progressive)
- Sealing rooms: 2

The Helsinki Finland Temple is a temple of the Church of Jesus Christ of Latter-day Saints in Espoo, Finland. Announced on April 2, 2000, it was the last temple dedicated by church president Gordon B. Hinckley and, at the time, served the church’s largest temple district, spanning at least a dozen time zones. After construction was completed, a public open house was held from September 21 to October 7, 2006, with about 57,000 visitors attending, prior to the temple being dedicated on October 22, 2006, in four sessions.

It is located on a wooded hilltop and built on solid rock and was designed by Evata Architects (Helsinki) in a style described as “classic elegance.” Its exterior combines light-gray Italian granite with Finnish brown granite site walls and a single spire with a statue of the angel Moroni on its top. The building is 212 by 103 feet, rises to 139 feet, and is 16,350 square feet, with two ordinance rooms, four sealing rooms, and a baptistry on the 7.4-acre site.

Ground was broken on March 29, 2003. On the eve of dedication, a cultural celebration brought together members from Finland, Russia, and the Baltic states under the theme “We are One, Big Family,” featuring multilingual musical numbers and traditional dances that emphasized unity across national traditions.

== History ==
Church president Gordon B. Hinckley announced plans for a temple in Helsinki on April 2, 2000, during general conference. The temple site—on a wooded rise in Espoo—was previously acquired and prepared for construction.

Groundbreaking and site dedication were held March 29, 2003, with D. Lee Tobler, a general authority and the president of the church's Europe Central Area, presiding.

In March 2006, the church announced the open house to be held for September 21 through October 7, 2006, excluding Sundays, and the dedication date of October 22, 2006.

During the open house, local leaders and invited guests toured the building, while church leaders such as Bruce C. Hafen, highlighted basic teachings accompanying the temple’s functions. Reported attendance totaled about 57,000 visitors over the three weeks.

On October 21, 2006, the evening before the dedication, a member meeting and cultural celebration were held. The temple was dedicated the next day in four sessions by Hinckley. It was the last temple Hinckley dedicated before his death in January 2008. At the time, the temple district spanned at least a dozen time zones across northern and eastern Europe, the largest geographical district then served by any church temple.

== Design and architecture ==
The temple’s exterior has light-gray Italian granite, stone walls on the grounds have brown Finnish granite, and it was built on solid rock. The design style of the building is referred to by the church as a classic elegance design. The temple has a spire with an angel Moroni statue, representing the restored gospel. The site is approximately 7.4 acres (3.0 ha). The building’s dimensions are about 212 by 103 feet, with an overall height of 139 feet to the top of the spire, and the total interior area is about 16,350 square feet (1,519 m²).

Inside, the temple has two instruction rooms, two sealing rooms, and a baptistry. The project design was prepared by Evata Architects of Helsinki; the project manager was Hanno Luschin and the general contractor NCC Rakennus Oy.

== Cultural and community impact ==
In the church's October 2021 general conference, Dale G. Renlund, of the Quorum of the Twelve Apostles, spoke of how his father, who had dreamed of a temple in Finland for decades, had a great distrust and dislike of Russians, which was typical for Finns. A year before the dedication, the temple committee met and discussed how Russian members would be traveling several days to attend the dedication, so the committee agreed unanimously to allow Russians to be the first members to perform ordinances in the temple. Dennis B. Neuenschwander, the church's area president, wrote of the experience that Finns allowing the Russian members to enter first was a statement of love and sacrifice. When Renlund discussed the event with his father, his father wept, uncharacteristic of his stoic nature, and his father did not speak against Russians for the rest of his life, dying three years later.

The open house (September 21–October 7, 2006) brought sustained public interest, with an estimated 57,000 visitors. During this time, over 1,200 political leaders and government officials, religious teachers and executives were part of the tour for special guests. One political leader said the temple was the most beautiful building in the whole city, and many others of the group stated they were impressed by the peacefulness and beauty of the temple. Finnish and Russian members stood in line to enter the temple together despite being long time enemies, with a member reporting feelings of love and unity, rather than enmity. Finnish members made sure there were ordinances performed in Russian so those members could worship in their own language.

The church’s national director of public affairs said that most Finns don’t have interest in spirituality, and they only expected around 25,000 visitors. The uptick was attributed to unusually positive media attention, including a national radio host’s endorsement and a 30-minute program on Estonian television. Due to the open house, the coverage and tours were reported to shift public sentiment toward greater acceptance of the church, members said friends and family understood them better, and there were 3,000 requests for copies of the Book of Mormon, which was unusual, as reportedly, a Finnish family accepting a copy was rare.

A cultural celebration was held October 21, 2006, with 7,000 church members in attendance. The theme of which was “We are One, Big Family”, and highlighted the power the temple had to create unity with diverse peoples and hostile nations. Church members from the various areas such as Russia, Lithuania, Finland, Latvia, and Estonia participated, most of whom had not met until the dress rehearsal the night before. Part of the program included a song from languages of each nation, which were sung at a depiction of the tower of Babel. This was followed by dances in each cultures native dress, followed by the cast dressing in white, while the temple was pictured onstage, intended to signify unity and healing differences.

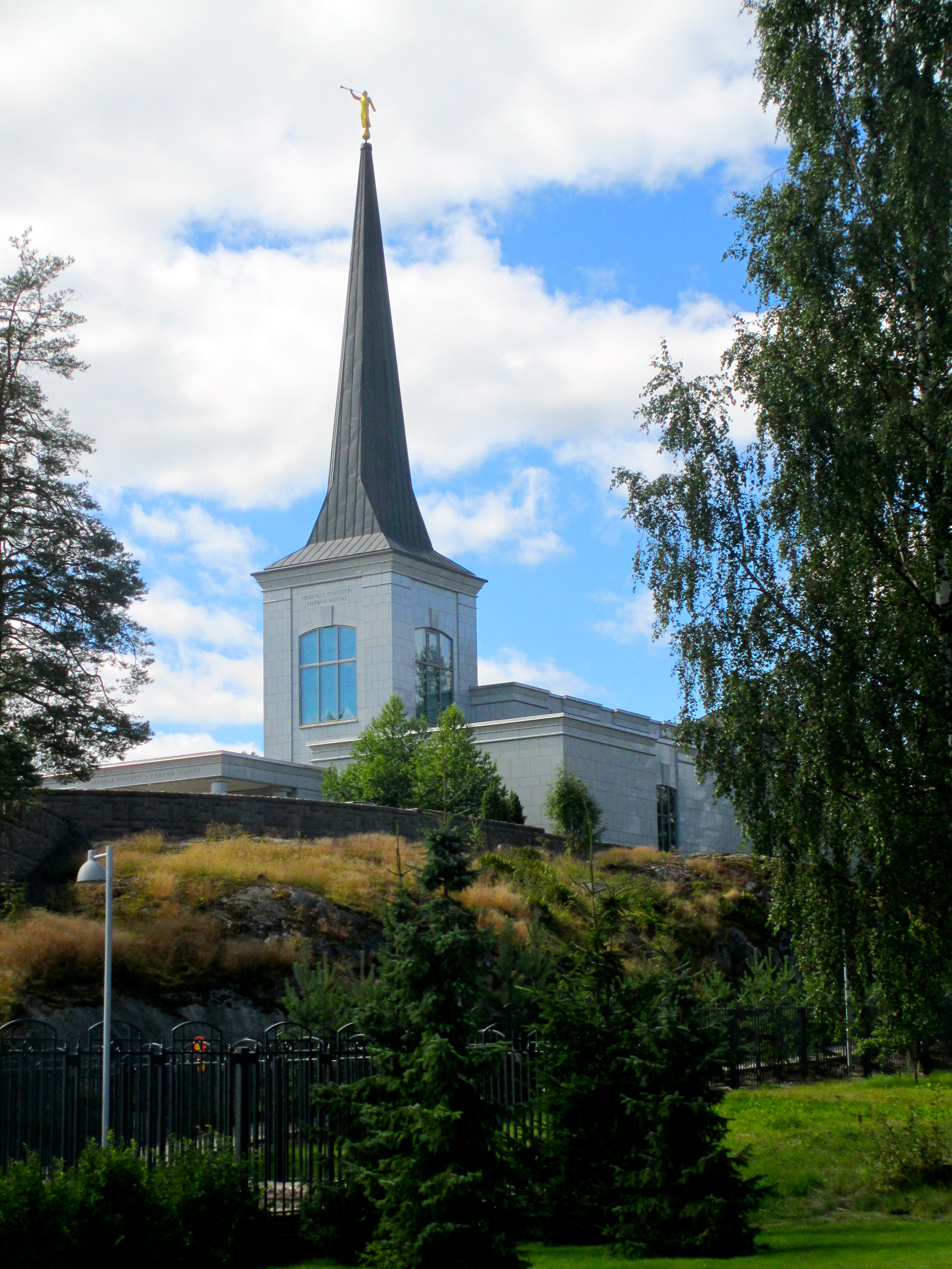

== Temple leadership and admittance ==
The church's temples are directed by a temple president and matron, each typically serving for a term of three years. The president and matron oversee the administration of temple operations and provide guidance and training for both temple patrons and staff.

Serving from 2006 to 2009, Melvin J. Luthy was the temple's first president, with Anne-Maj S. Luthy serving as matron. As of 2024, Ville Kervinen is the president, with Leena Kervinen serving as matron.

Like all the church's temples, it is not used for Sunday worship services. To members of the church, temples are regarded as sacred houses of the Lord. Once dedicated, only church members with a current temple recommend can enter for worship.

== See also ==
- Comparison of temples of The Church of Jesus Christ of Latter-day Saints
- List of temples of The Church of Jesus Christ of Latter-day Saints
- List of temples of The Church of Jesus Christ of Latter-day Saints by geographic region
- Temple architecture (Latter-day Saints)
