= Fresno California Temple =

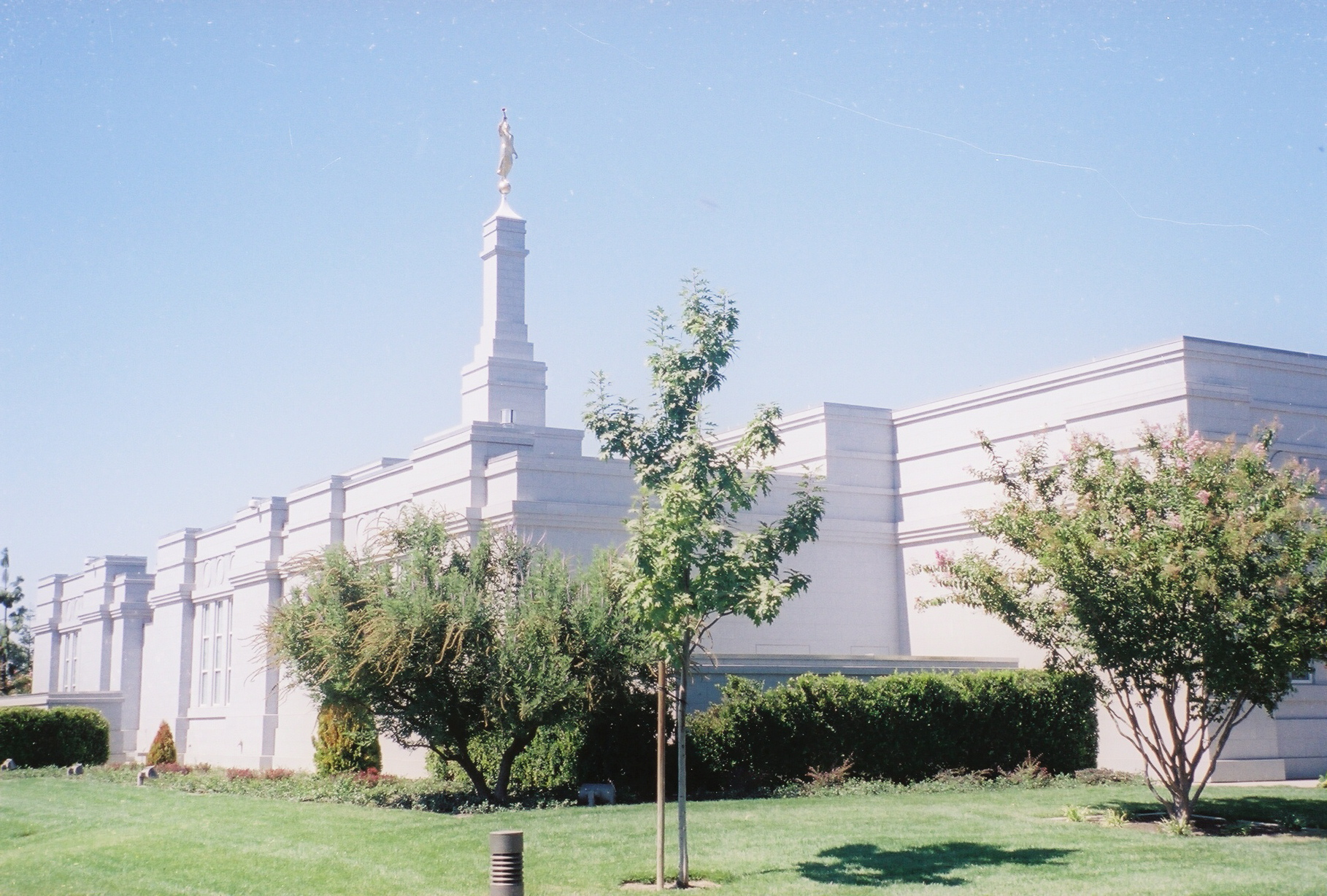
- Interactive map of Fresno California Temple
- Number: 78
- Dedication: April 9, 2000, by Gordon B. Hinckley
- Site: 2.34 acres (0.95 ha)
- Floor area: 10,700 ft^{2} (990 m^{2})
- Height: 71 ft (22 m)
- Official website • News & images

Church chronology
← Palmyra New York Temple	Fresno California Temple	→ Medford Oregon Temple

Additional information
- Announced: January 8, 1999, by Gordon B. Hinckley
- Groundbreaking: March 20, 1999, by John B. Dickson
- Open house: March 25 – April 4, 2000
- Current president: Cliff Keith Woolley
- Designed by: Paul Stommel AIA
- Location: Fresno, California, United States
- Coordinates: 36°49′41.5″N 119°51′10.7″W
- Exterior finish: White Sierra granite quarried in Raymond, California
- Design: Classic modern, single-spire design
- Baptistries: 1
- Ordinance rooms: 2 (two-stage progressive)
- Sealing rooms: 2

The Fresno California Temple is the 78th operating temple of the Church of Jesus Christ of Latter-day Saints (LDS Church). The intent to build the temple was announced on January 8, 1999, by the church's First Presidency. The temple was the fourth in California and the first in the central part of the state.

The temple has a single attached spire with a statue of the angel Moroni. This temple was designed by Paul Stommel, using a traditional architectural style. A groundbreaking ceremony, to signify the beginning of construction, was held on March 20, 1999, conducted by John B. Dickson, a general authority and president of the church's North America West Area.

== History ==
California has long had a history with the LDS Church, starting with members who sailed to San Francisco aboard an emigrant ship called the Brooklyn and members of the U.S. Army unit known as the Mormon Battalion who were discharged in San Diego, many of whom stayed and helped build up the San Diego area.

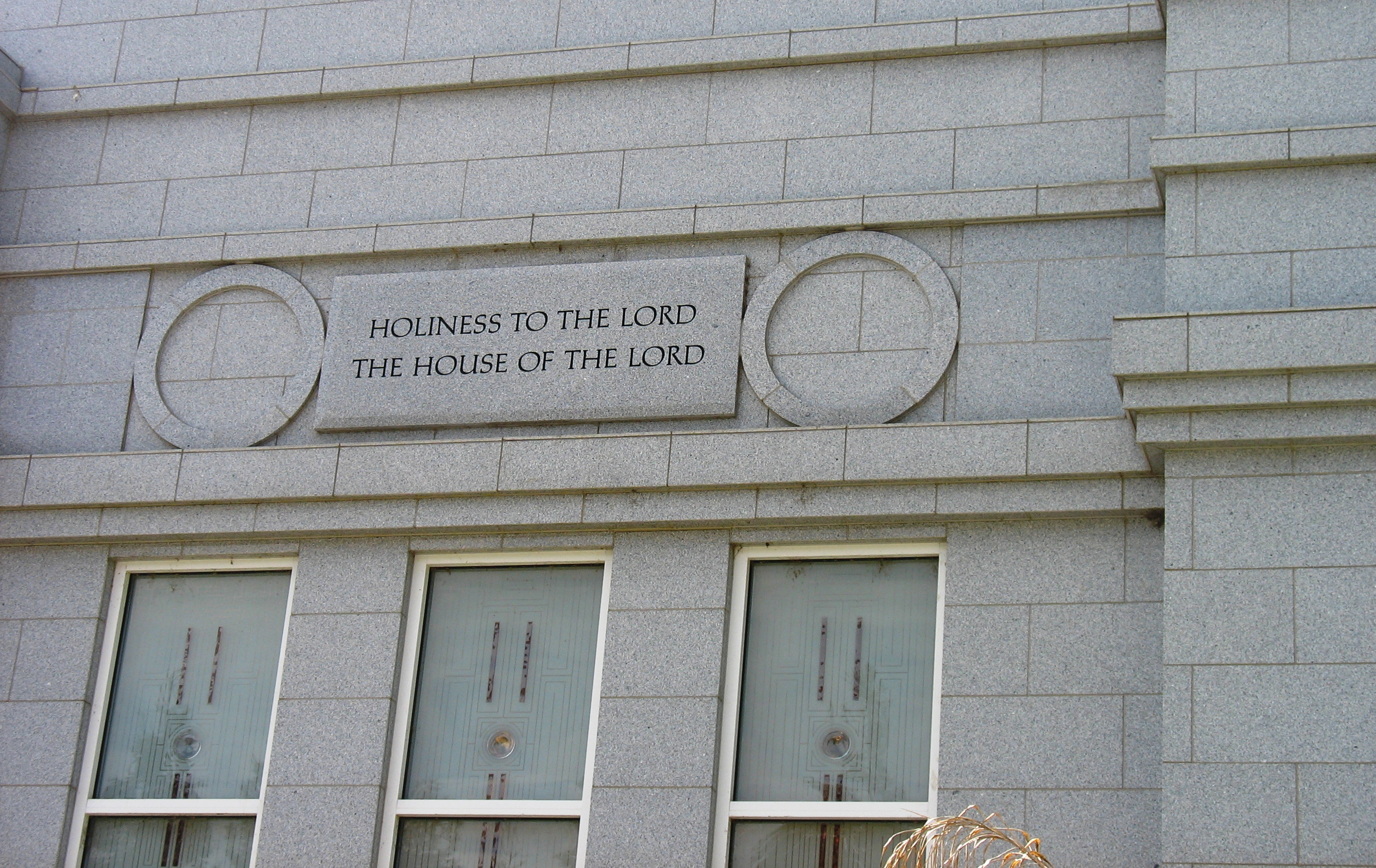
Side of the temple

A groundbreaking ceremony was held in March 1999. After construction was completed, it was opened to the public from March 25-31 and April 3-4, 2000. During that time 51,000 people toured the temple. On April 9, 2000, LDS Church president Gordon B. Hinckley dedicated the temple. It has the same design as other smaller temples built worldwide during that time.

In 2020, like all the church's others, the Fresno California Temple was closed for a time in response to the COVID-19 pandemic.

== Design and architecture ==
The building uses traditional Latter-day Saint temple design, was designed by Paul Stommel, and its architecture reflects both the cultural heritage of central California and its spiritual significance to the church.

The temple is on a 2.2-acre plot, with surrounding landscaping of trees and grassy fields. The structure has one story and is constructed with Sierra white granite. The exterior has a multilevel tower on its top, as well as the rectangular art-glass windows, arranged in groups of three, that decorate each wall of the temple.

The temple has two ordinance rooms, two sealing rooms, and a baptistry, each designed for ceremonial use.

The design uses elements representing Latter-day Saint symbolism, to provide deeper spiritual meaning to its appearance and function. Symbolism is important to church members, and includes the angel Moroni statue on the steeple, which represents “the restoration of the gospel of Jesus Christ.”

== Temple presidents ==
The church's temples are directed by a temple president and matron, each generally serving for a term of three years. The president and matron oversee the administration of temple operations and provide guidance and training for both temple patrons and staff.

Serving from 2000 to 2004, the first president of the Fresno California Temple was Wilford L. Dredge, with Annette K. Dredge as matron. As of 2025, Cliff K. Woolley is the president, with Zonda D. Woolley serving as matron.

== Admittance ==
After construction was completed, a public open house was held on March 25-31 and April 3-4, 2000, with approximately 51,000 people attending. The temple was dedicated by Gordon B. Hinckley on April 9, 2000, in four sessions.

Like all the church's temples, it is not used for Sunday worship services. To members of the church, temples are regarded as sacred houses of the Lord. Once dedicated, only church members with a current temple recommend can enter for worship.

== See also ==
Temples in California
Los Angeles Temples
Temples in the Los Angeles metropolitan
area
- = Operating
- = Under construction
- = Announced
- = Temporarily closed

- Comparison of temples of The Church of Jesus Christ of Latter-day Saints
- List of temples of The Church of Jesus Christ of Latter-day Saints
- List of temples of The Church of Jesus Christ of Latter-day Saints by geographic region
- Temple architecture (Latter-day Saints)
- The Church of Jesus Christ of Latter-day Saints in California

== Additional reading ==
- "Six temple dates announced", Church News, February 12, 2000
- Lloyd, R. Scott (April 22, 2000), "Fresno California Temple: Symbol of growth in fertile San Joaquin", Church News
