= The Church of Jesus Christ of Latter-day Saints in California =

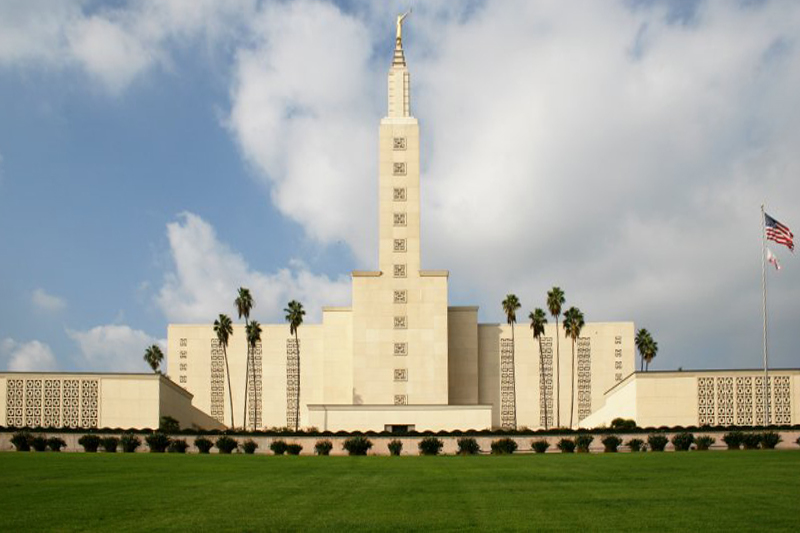
- The Los Angeles California Temple
- Area: US West
- Members: 725,648 (2025)
- Stakes: 145
- Wards: 946
- Branches: 139
- Total Congregations: 1,085
- Missions: 16
- Temples: 9 operating 1 under construction 2 announced 12 total
- FamilySearch Centers: 228

The state of California has the second largest number of members of the Church of Jesus Christ of Latter-day Saints (LDS Church) in the United States, behind Utah. The LDS Church is the second largest denomination in California, behind the Roman Catholic Church.

== History ==
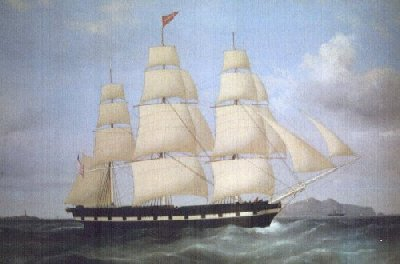
The ship Brooklyn, painting by Duncan McFarlane

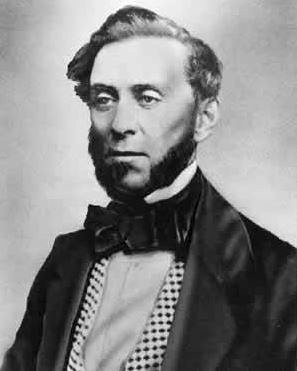
Samuel Brannan

=== Brooklyn Saints ===
A Mormon immigrant company, under direction of Samuel Brannan, departed on the ship Brooklyn from New York on February 4, 1846, en route to the Salt Lake Valley via California. The ship navigated around Cape Horn and arrived at Yerba Buena on July 31, 1846. The company of around 230 people were the first known Latter-day Saints to set foot in California. Their numbers nearly tripled the population of the small town of Yerba Buena, later renamed San Francisco.

While there, Brannan and other church members began publication of one of California's first English-language newspapers, the California Star, in October 1846. One of the Brooklyn saints, Angeline Lovett, set up a school in the old Franciscan Dolores Mission, the first English-language school in California.

During the early autumn of 1846, Brannan led 20 men to the San Joaquin Valley where they founded a Mormon farming colony named New Hope. It soon failed as heavy seasonal storms flooded the valley, destroying their crops. Most of the Brooklyn saints left California for Salt Lake City in 1848.

=== Mormon Battalion and California Gold Rush ===
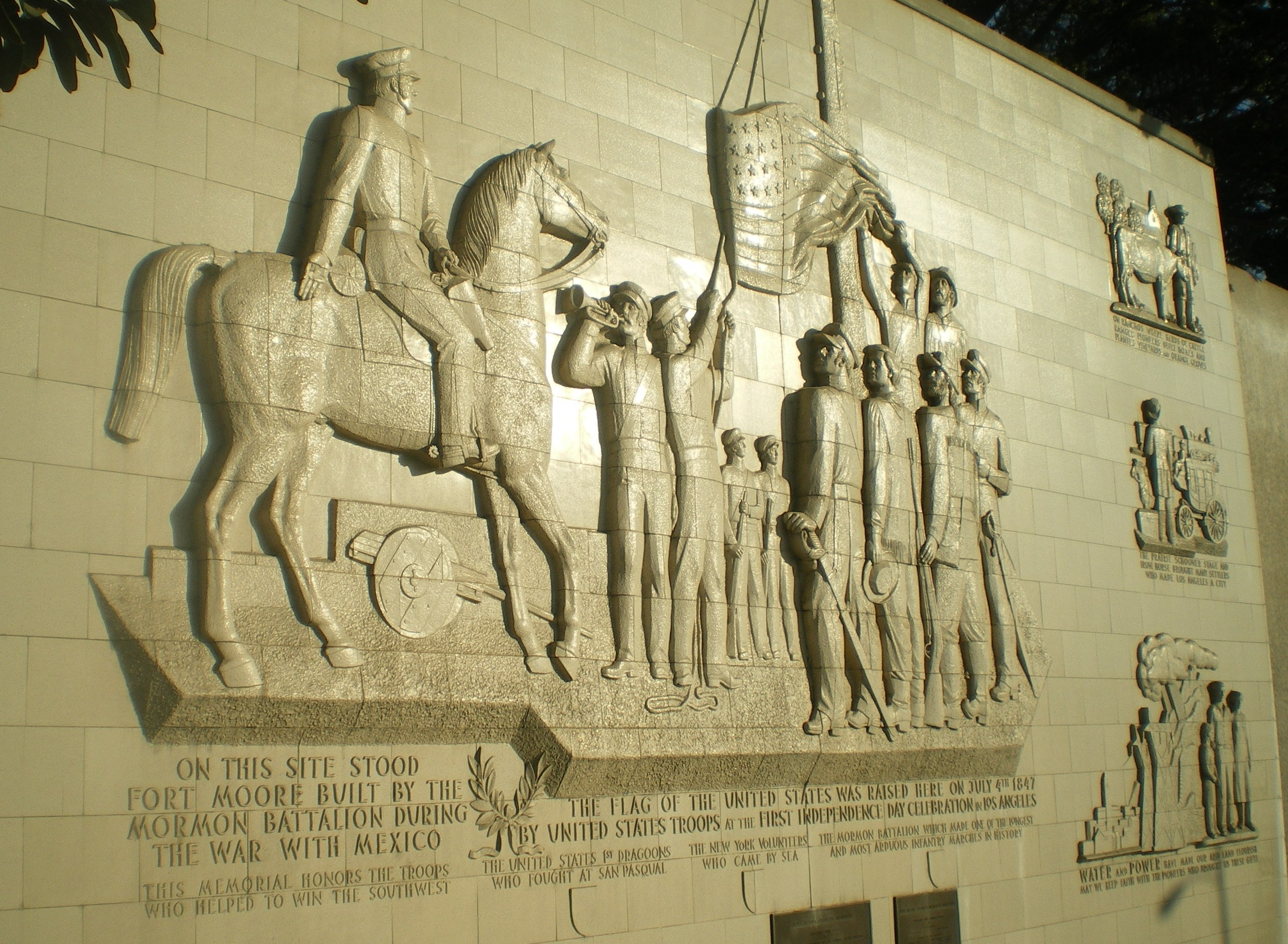
Fort Moore Pioneer Memorial, Los Angeles

In January 1847, the Mormon Battalion arrived in San Diego. Battalion members helped construct a number of building and public works in San Diego. They then traveled to Los Angeles where they built a fort and raised the first American flag in California. After being discharged in July 1847, the Battalion members broke into various groups, with some reenlisting and others going to work to earn provisions for the journey east to rejoin their families. Six discharged battalion members were at Sutter's Mill in northern California when gold was discovered there on January 24, 1848. On their way to Salt Lake City, they blazed the Mormon Emigrant Trail that would be used by thousands of westward bound travelers including the gold rush "Forty-Niners." Three of the former Battalion members were killed at a place known as Tragedy Spring while helping to forge the trail.

In February 1856, George Q. Cannon began publication in San Francisco of the Western Standard, a weekly periodical supportive of the church.

=== San Bernardino LDS colony ===
Main: History of San Bernardino, California: Mormon San Bernardino

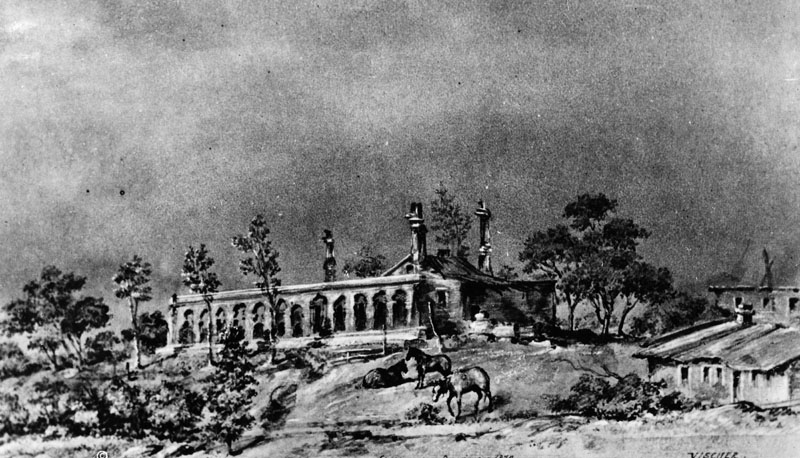
April 1865 sketch of the ruins of the Mormon Elders residence in San Bernardino, California.

The first colonization from Utah to California came in 1851 when a company of about 450 saints and enslaved people under direction of Amasa M. Lyman and Charles C. Rich of the Quorum of the Twelve Apostles settled at what is now San Bernardino. Initially Fort San Bernardino, the colony became the final settlement in a string of Mormon communities extending 800 miles (1,300 km) from Salt Lake City in an area known as Deseret. The community thrived, and on July 6, 1851, the San Bernardino Stake, California's first, was organized. The colony was dissolved by the church at the advance of Johnston's Army toward Salt Lake City in 1857. Brigham Young instructed the settlers to return to Utah to colonize. About 1,400 (fewer than half) returned to Utah at the request of the church. The San Bernardino Stake was dissolved in 1857 as well as the ecclesiastical units within the stake.

=== Significant church growth and history 1895-1990 ===
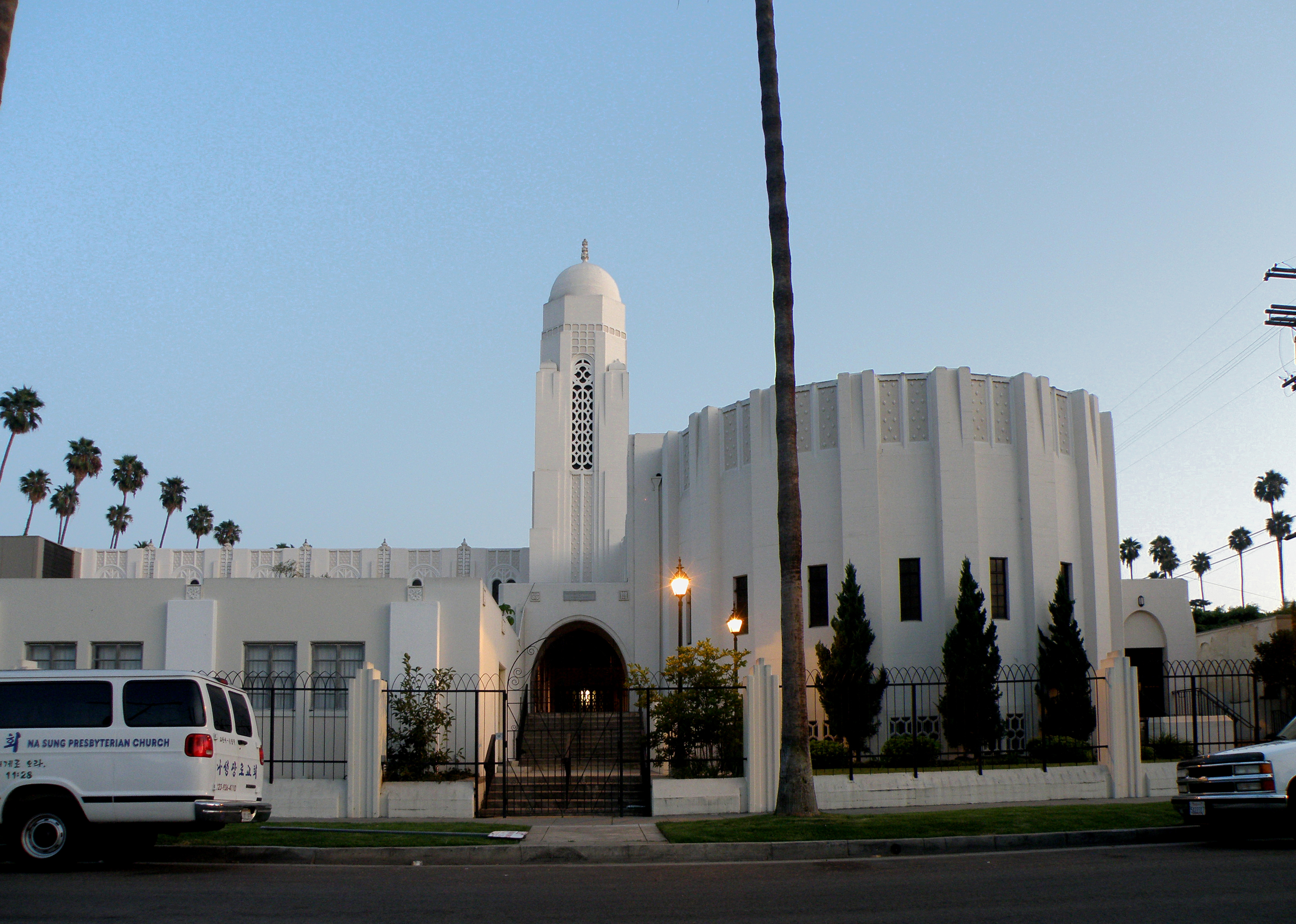
Wilshire Ward Chapel, Los Angeles

The Los Angeles Branch was created on March 21, 1895. In 1896, the Northern California and Southern California conferences were organized. The Sacramento Conference was added in 1898. Most missionary work around the turn of the century took place in larger population centers.

On January 21, 1923, the Los Angeles Stake became the first to be created in the state since the San Bernardino Stake had been dissolved. The Los Angeles Stake was divided on May 22, 1927 to form the Los Angeles and Hollywood stakes. On July 10, 1927, the San Francisco Stake was established.

On February 18, 1939, 1,400 people visited the church's exhibit at the opening day of the Golden Gate International Exposition in San Francisco. This exhibit was a visitors' center portraying a reduced-size Salt Lake Tabernacle.

Eight more stakes were created in the 1930s, five in the 1940s, and 30 in the 1950s. The completion of the Los Angeles and Oakland temples soon followed.

In 1980, church president Spencer W. Kimball spoke to members in the Los Angeles area in the Rose Bowl, with an estimated 75,000 in attendance.

=== Recent history 1990-present ===
At the beginning of the year 2000, California had 17 missions, more than any other state in the United States. In the state's major cities, many minority converts were taught and baptized in their native language. With a significant immigration to California from Latin America, five Spanish-speaking stakes have been organized. Various Asian and Polynesian wards function as well, and a Tongan stake was created in San Francisco in 1992. There are currently more than 200 ethnic wards and branches in California.

Church president Gordon B. Hinckley attended the rededication of the historic Hollywood (now Los Angeles California) Stake Center on June 8, 2003.

In 2024, a San Jose-based law firm would file 91 lawsuits against the LDS Church related to sex abuse allegations in California. In 2026, former Livermore LDS bishop Michael Morris was arrested and criminally charged with 18 counts of felony child sex abuse.

=== Historical reenactments ===
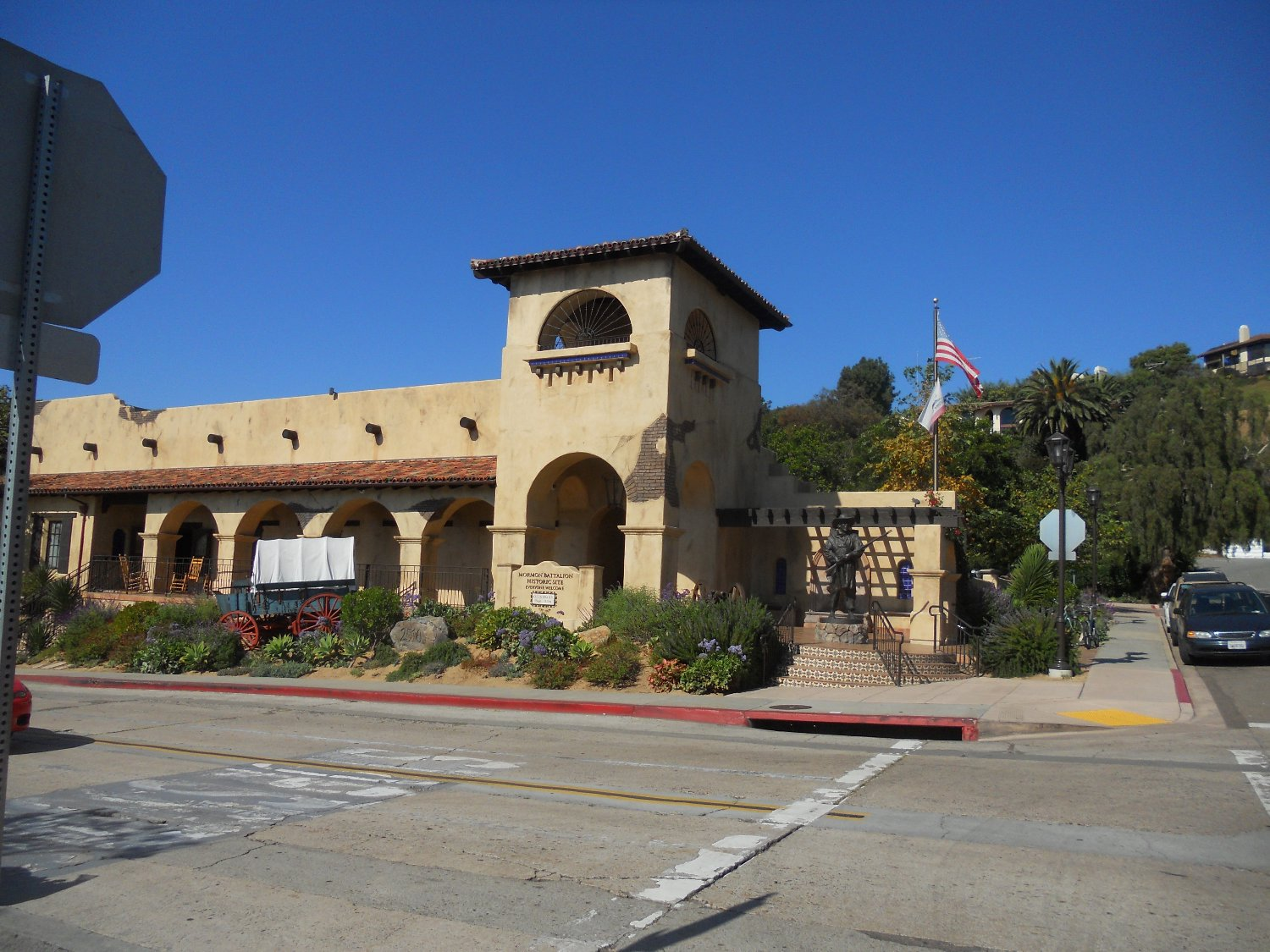
Mormon Battalion Historic Site

In July 1996, the sesquicentennial of the arrival of the ship Brooklyn was celebrated through reenactment of the event on a replica ship that sailed into the San Francisco Bay. Church members throughout the state commemorated the anniversary with observances that included an exhibit at the San Francisco Maritime Museum, performances of the Mormon Tabernacle Choir at the Davies Symphony Hall, dedications of plaques honoring the early settlers, and pioneer activities and parades.

In addition to commemorating the arrival of early Latter-day Saint settlers, as well as contributions to the development of the state, members throughout California donated many hours of service in community projects sponsored by wards and stakes, including gathering supplies and food for the needy; cleaning parks, beaches and roadways; painting and repairing homeless shelters, and cleaning up graffiti.

On January 18, 1997, 2,400 church members re-enacted the arrival of the Mormon Battalion in California 150 years earlier. Other Mormon Battalion celebrations along the coast followed on respective anniversaries. On March 6, 1997, Hinckley spoke to a record audience of the Los Angeles World Affairs Council, and on March 19, he addressed the World Forum of Silicon Valley. He also spoke at various church events during the year. A church-produced video depicting the discovery of gold at Sutter's Mill was donated to the state of California to be shown continuously at Marshall Gold Discovery State Park in Coloma.

=== Membership history ===
Membership growth has slowed in California since 1991 and began to decrease starting in the 2010s.

Year	LDS Membership
1846	230
1920	3,800
1930	21,254
1940	44,800
1950	102,000
1960	217,600
1970	349,000
1980	541,000
1989	716,000
1999	740,000
2009	757,895
2019	756,507
2025	725,648

== Disaster relief and humanitarian aid ==
In times of disasters, such as earthquakes, fires, and floods, church members in California have donated countless hours of service, helping communities to recover.

In 1997, members in San Diego donated some 40-50 tons of food to eight community agencies for the homeless and needy.

In May 2003, hundreds of Los Angeles-area Muslims and members of the Pasadena California Stake joined in preparing emergency supplies for Iraqi families. With conflicts of the war with Iraq completed, a humanitarian aid day was set for May 10, 2003, where hygiene kits for some 10,000 families were completed and added to a $650,000 shipment of medical supplies and blankets donated by the church.

== Moral issues ==
Church members in the state have also taken leadership roles in moral issues, such as combating pornography and have cooperated with other congregations of various interfaith endeavors. Members have been active in other moral issues including abortion, gambling, drug and alcohol abuse, and marriage.

== County statistics ==
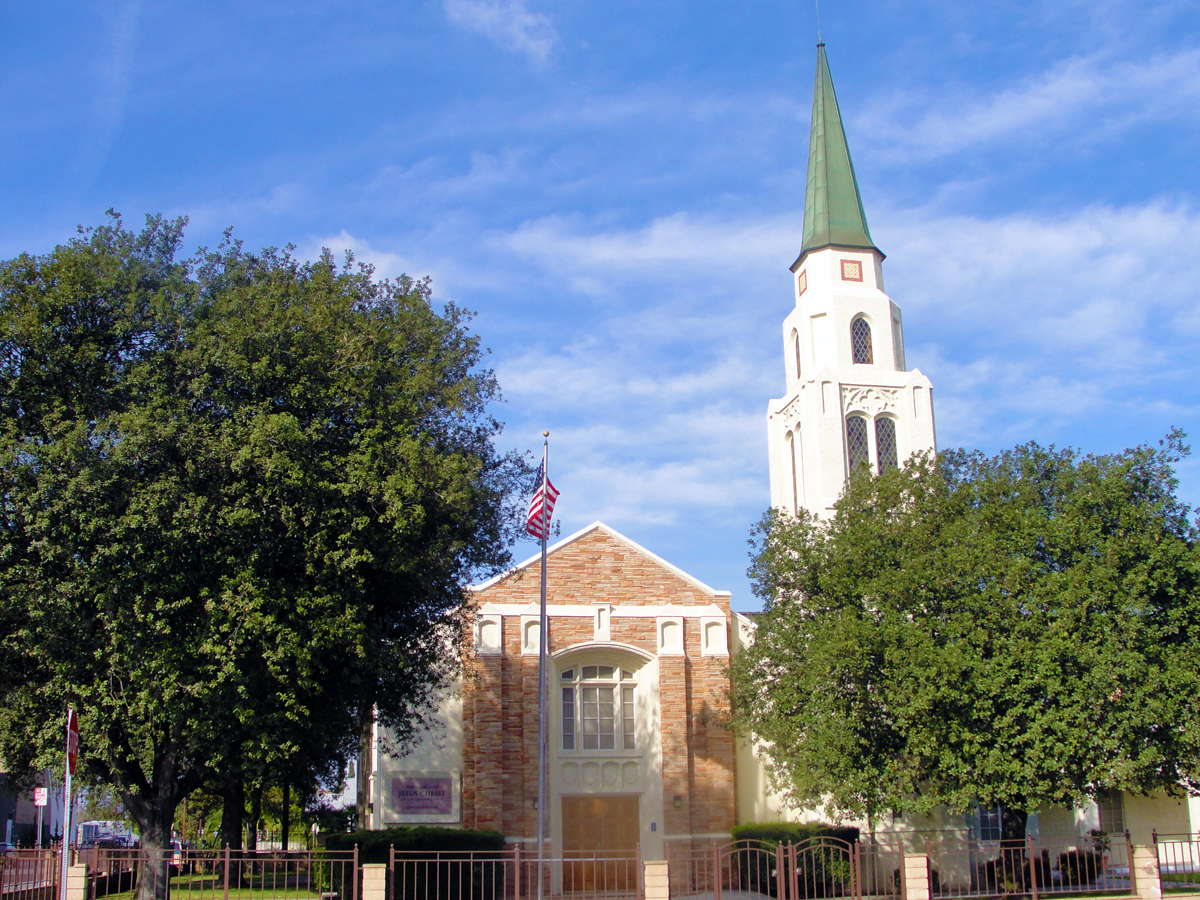
A meetinghouse of The Church of Jesus Christ of Latter-day Saints in Maywood, California.

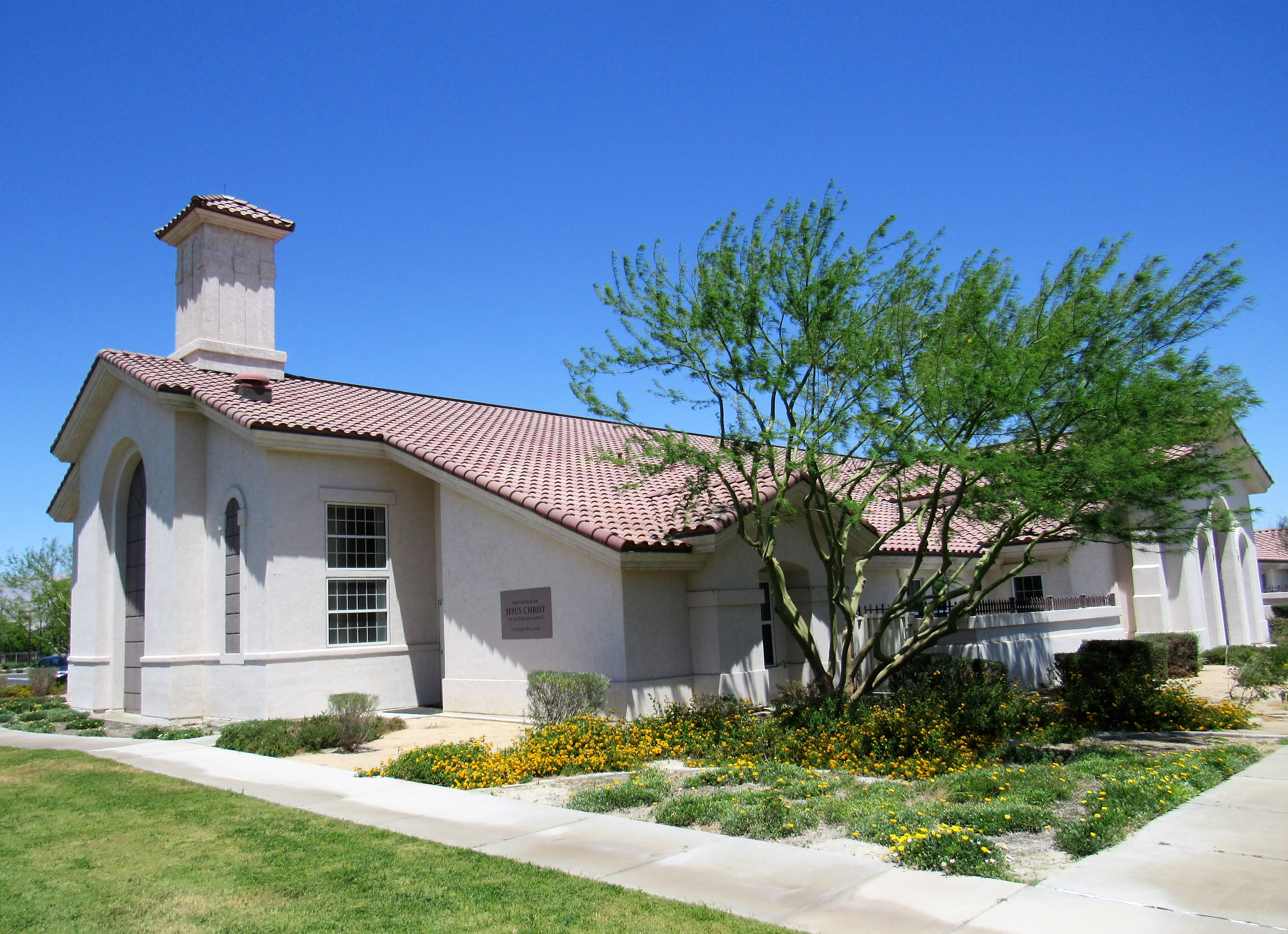
A meetinghouse of The Church of Jesus Christ of Latter-day Saints in Palm Desert, California.

List of LDS Church adherents in each county as of 2010 according to the Association of Religion Data Archives: Note: Each county adherent count reflects meetinghouse location of congregation and not by location of residence. Census count reflects location of residence which may skew percent of population in locations where adherents reside in a different county as their congregational meetinghouse.

County	Congregations	Adherents	% of Population
Alameda	46	24,929	1.65
Alpine	0		
Amador	2	1,196	3.14
Butte	16	9,357	4.25
Calaveras	3	1,597	3.50
Colusa	1	372	1.74
Contra Costa	42	21,505	2.05
Del Norte	2	1,213	4.24
El Dorado	15	7,030	3.88
Fresno	36	21,404	2.30
Glenn	3	820	2.92
Humboldt	7	3,557	2.64
Imperial	5	3,149	1.80
Inyo	5	4,827	26.03
Kern	38	21,095	2.51
Kings	5	2,362	1.54
Lake	5	2,294	3.55
Lassen	3	1,341	3.84
Los Angeles	226	150,569	1.53
Madera	5	3,355	2.22
Marin	4	2,468	0.98
Mariposa	1	392	2.15
Mendocino	4	2,335	2.66
Merced	10	4,448	1.74
Modoc	2	344	3.55
Mono	2	337	2.37
Monterey	10	5,906	1.42
Napa	6	2,209	1.62
Nevada	3	1,683	1.70
Orange	121	66,772	2.22
Placer	33	15,179	4.36
Plumas	3	755	3.77
Riverside	96	51,957	2.37
Sacramento	77	44,951	3.17
San Benito	3	1,151	2.08
San Bernardino	103	52,314	2.57
San Diego	120	71,495	2.31
San Francisco	5	5,923	0.74
San Joaquin	24	15,653	2.28
San Luis Obispo	12	6,216	2.31
San Mateo	21	13,240	1.84
Santa Barbara	14	7,241	1.71
Santa Clara	45	24,739	1.39
Santa Cruz	6	3,709	1.41
Shasta	11	6,843	3.86
Sierra	1	101	3.12
Siskiyou	5	1,629	3.63
Solano	21	10,313	2.50
Sonoma	17	9,069	1.87
Stanislaus	31	13,859	2.69
Sutter	7	3,135	3.31
Tehama	3	2,078	3.27
Tuolumne	3	1,425	2.57
Trinity	2	385	2.79
Tulare	15	7,740	1.75
Ventura	44	20,123	2.44
Yolo	9	4,839	2.41
Yuba	5	3,096	4.29

== Stakes ==
As of July 2026, California had the following Stakes:

Stake	Organized	Mission	Temple
Anaheim California	14-Mar-1965	California Anaheim	Yorba Linda California
Anderson California	10-Jun-1979	California Roseville	Feather River California
Antioch California	3-May-1981	California Oakland/San Francisco	Oakland California
Apple Valley California	10-Sep-2006	California Victorville	Redlands California
Arcadia California	9-Oct-1977	California Arcadia	Los Angeles California
Auburn California	27-May-1979	California Roseville	Sacramento California
Bakersfield California East	18-Jun-1978	California Bakersfield	Los Angeles California
Bakersfield California South	14-Dec-1986	California Bakersfield	Los Angeles California
Bakersfield California	27-May-1951	California Bakersfield	Los Angeles California
Bakersfield California West	8 Sep 2024	California Bakersfield	Los Angeles California
Brea California	21-Sep-1975	California Anaheim	Yorba Linda California
Camarillo California	8-Aug-1976	California Ventura	Los Angeles California
Capistrano Valley California	22-Oct-2023	California Newport Beach	Newport Beach California
Carlsbad California	6-Nov-1960	California Carlsbad	San Diego California
Carmichael California	25-Nov-1984	California Sacramento	Sacramento California
Carson City Nevada (Note: Stake located outside California with congregation(s) meeting in California)	9-Apr-1978	Nevada Reno	Reno Nevada
Cerritos California	26-Oct-1958	California Anaheim	Los Angeles California
Chatsworth California	8-Oct-1961	California Los Angeles	Los Angeles California
Chico California	6-Feb-1972	California Roseville	Feather River California
Chino California	14-Oct-1979	California Ontario	Yorba Linda California
Citrus Heights California	22-Jun-1980	California Sacramento	Sacramento California
Corona California	19-Nov-1978	California Ontario	Yorba Linda California
Cypress California	15-Feb-1970	California Anaheim	Newport Beach California
Danville California	26-Aug-1956	California Oakland/San Francisco	Oakland California
Del Mar California	7-Jan-1990	California Carlsbad	San Diego California
Downey California	19-Apr-1959	California Los Angeles	Los Angeles California
East Los Angeles California (Spanish)	26-Feb-1950	California Arcadia	Los Angeles California
El Cajon California	20-Apr-1958	California San Diego	San Diego California
El Dorado California	19-Nov-1978	California Sacramento	Sacramento California
Elk Grove California	15-Jun-1969	California Sacramento	Sacramento California
Escondido California	24-Sep-1972	California Carlsbad	San Diego California
Eureka California	22-Oct-1961	California Santa Rosa	Medford Oregon
Fairfield California	16-Feb-1975	California Santa Rosa	Oakland California
Folsom California	12-Feb-1967	California Sacramento	Sacramento California
Fontana California	22-Jun-1986	California Victorville	Redlands California
Fremont California	11-Dec-1966	California San Jose	Oakland California
Fresno California East	15-Sep-1963	California Fresno	Fresno California
Fresno California North	12-Feb-1984	California Fresno	Fresno California
Fresno California	20-May-1951	California Fresno	Fresno California
Fresno California West	12-Feb-1984	California Fresno	Fresno California
Glendora California	14-Nov-1976	California Arcadia	Los Angeles California
Gridley California	4-Nov-1934	California Roseville	Feather River California
Hacienda Heights California	17-Sep-1967	California Arcadia	Yorba Linda California
Hanford California	6-Aug-1978	California Fresno	Fresno California
Hemet California	17-Sep-1978	California Riverside	Redlands California
Hesperia California	22-Feb-1987	California Victorville	Redlands California
Huntington Beach California	5-Jun-1966	California Anaheim	Newport Beach California
Inglewood California	26-Nov-1939	California Los Angeles	Los Angeles California
Irvine California	12-Apr-1987	California Newport Beach	Newport Beach California
Klamath Falls Oregon	22-Mar-1953	Oregon Eugene	Medford Oregon
La Crescenta California	7-Jun-1970	California Arcadia	Los Angeles California
La Verne California	21-Jan-1962	California Ontario	Los Angeles California
Laguna Niguel California	20-Jun-1982	California Newport Beach	Newport Beach California
Lake Elsinore California	22-Sep-2013	California Riverside	San Diego California
Lake Havasu City Arizona	14-Mar-1976	Nevada Henderson	Las Vegas Nevada
Lancaster California East	18-May-1991	California Bakersfield	Los Angeles California
Lancaster California	28-Nov-1976	California Bakersfield	Los Angeles California
Lincoln California	30-Jan-2011	California Roseville	Feather River California
Livermore California	13-Sep-1987	California San Jose	Oakland California
Lodi California	10-Apr-1977	California Modesto	Sacramento California
Long Beach California East	12-Feb-1950	California Anaheim	Newport Beach California
Long Beach California	3-May-1936	California Anaheim	Los Angeles California
Los Altos California	24-Aug-1975	California San Jose	Oakland California
Los Angeles California	22-May-1927	California Los Angeles	Los Angeles California
Manteca California	22-Mar-1981	California Modesto	Oakland California
Medford Oregon	23-Aug-1964	Oregon Eugene	Medford Oregon
Menifee California	15-Oct-1995	California Riverside	Redlands California
Menlo Park California	23-Jun-1946	California San Jose	Oakland California
Merced California	15-Sep-1974	California Fresno	Fresno California
Mission Viejo California	8-May-1977	California Newport Beach	Newport Beach California
Modesto California North	26-Oct-1975	California Modesto	Oakland California
Modesto California	7-Jun-1964	California Modesto	Oakland California
Monterey California	2-Mar-1958	California San Jose	Oakland California
Moreno Valley California	27-Sep-1987	California Riverside	Redlands California
Morgan Hill California	15-May-1977	California San Jose	Oakland California
Murrieta California	20-Mar-1988	California Riverside	San Diego California
Napa California	17-Apr-1960	California Santa Rosa	Oakland California
Newbury Park California	18-Aug-1974	California Ventura	Los Angeles California
Newport Beach California	31-Mar-1968	California Newport Beach	Newport Beach California
North Hollywood California	16-Sep-1956	California Los Angeles	Los Angeles California
Oakland California East (Tongan)	18-Feb-2007	California Oakland/San Francisco	Oakland California
Oakland California	2-Dec-1934	California Oakland/San Francisco	Oakland California
Ontario California	9-Dec-1979	California Ontario	Redlands California
Orange California	8-Dec-1957	California Anaheim	Yorba Linda California
Palm Desert California	27-Aug-1967	California San Bernardino	Redlands California
Palmdale California	12-May-1968	California Bakersfield	Los Angeles California
Palos Verdes California	18-Jan-1976	California Los Angeles	Los Angeles California
Pasadena California	15-Oct-1939	California Arcadia	Los Angeles California
Penasquitos California	21-Sep-1986	California San Diego	San Diego California
Porterville California	16-Jun-1996	California Fresno	Fresno California
Poway California	26-Aug-1979	California San Diego	San Diego California
Quincy California	14-Oct-1979	Nevada Reno	Reno Nevada
Rancho Cucamonga California	28-Jun-1987	California Ontario	Redlands California
Redding California	13-Dec-1960	California Roseville	Feather River California
Redlands California	4-Jun-1978	California San Bernardino	Redlands California
Reno Nevada	9-Feb-1941	Nevada Reno	Reno Nevada
Rialto California	20-Mar-1966	California Victorville	Redlands California
Ridgecrest California	16-Aug-1970	California Bakersfield	Los Angeles California
Riverside California	26-Oct-1952	California Riverside	Redlands California
Rocklin California	19-Apr-1992	California Roseville	Sacramento California
Roseville California	17-May-1970	California Roseville	Sacramento California
Sacramento California Cordova	22-Jun-1980	California Sacramento	Sacramento California
Sacramento California East	6-Dec-1959	California Sacramento	Sacramento California
Sacramento California North	12-Dec-1954	California Sacramento	Sacramento California
Sacramento California	4-Nov-1934	California Sacramento	Sacramento California
San Bernardino California	3-Feb-1935	California San Bernardino	Redlands California
San Clemente California	13-Jun-2004	California Newport Beach	Newport Beach California
San Diego California East	30-Nov-1975	California San Diego	San Diego California
San Diego California South	19-Sep-1976	California San Diego	San Diego California
San Diego California	9-Feb-1941	California San Diego	San Diego California
San Francisco California East (Tongan)	10-May-1992	California Oakland/San Francisco	Oakland California
San Francisco California	10-Jul-1927	California Oakland/San Francisco	Oakland California
San Jose California South	11-Feb-1968	California San Jose	Oakland California
San Jose California	30-Nov-1952	California San Jose	Oakland California
San Leandro California	21-May-1961	California Oakland/San Francisco	Oakland California
San Luis Obispo California	22-Sep-1957	California Ventura	Los Angeles California
San Marcos California	11-Sep-2022	California Carlsbad	San Diego California
San Mateo California	24-Feb-1985	California Oakland/San Francisco	Oakland California
San Rafael California	23-Jun-1968	California Santa Rosa	Oakland California
Santa Ana California South (Spanish)	5-Jan-1992	California Anaheim	Yorba Linda California
Santa Barbara California	18-Mar-1951	California Ventura	Los Angeles California
Santa Clarita California	19-May-1974	California Bakersfield	Los Angeles California
Santa Cruz California	24-Apr-1977	California San Jose	Oakland California
Santa Margarita California	17-Jan-1993	California Newport Beach	Newport Beach California
Santa Maria California	20-Oct-1963	California Ventura	Los Angeles California
Santa Rosa California	7-Jan-1951	California Santa Rosa	Oakland California
Saratoga California	10-Nov-1963	California San Jose	Oakland California
Simi Valley California	10-Dec-1967	California Ventura	Los Angeles California
Stockton California	25-Apr-1948	California Modesto	Sacramento California
Sunset Beach California	16-Jan-1977	California Anaheim	Newport Beach California
Temecula California North	27-Apr-2003	California Riverside	San Diego California
Temecula California South	03-Dec-2023	California Riverside	San Diego California
Thousand Oaks California	11-Jan-1987	California Ventura	Los Angeles California
Torrance California North	29-May-1955	California Los Angeles	Los Angeles California
Turlock California	23-Mar-1986	California Modesto	Oakland California
Ukiah California	30-Oct-1977	California Santa Rosa	Feather River California
Upland California	13-Aug-1972	California Ontario	Redlands California
Vacaville California	26-May-1991	California Santa Rosa	Sacramento California
Valencia California	2-Feb-1992	California Bakersfield	Los Angeles California
Ventura California	30-May-1971	California Ventura	Los Angeles California
Victorville California	30-Jan-1983	California Victorville	Redlands California
Visalia California	24-Aug-1969	California Fresno	Fresno California
Vista California	8-Oct-1978	California Carlsbad	San Diego California
Walnut Creek California	16-Feb-1986	California Oakland/San Francisco	Oakland California
Whittier California	26-Apr-1959	California Arcadia	Yorba Linda California
Woodland California	22-Jun-1980	California Santa Rosa	Sacramento California
Yorba Linda California	24-Feb-1985	California Anaheim	Yorba Linda California
Yuba City California	4-Nov-1979	California Roseville	Feather River California
Yucaipa California	25-Apr-2004	California San Bernardino	Redlands California
Yucca Valley California	9-Jan-1994	California San Bernardino	Redlands California

== Missions ==
The California Mission was opened on July 31, 1846 with Samuel Brannan as president. It was discontinued in 1858 due to the Utah War, but later reopened in 1892 with Luther Dalton, who began missionary labors in San Francisco and Oakland. In 1894, Karl G. Maeser relocated to California to direct the Utah exhibit in the state's mid-winter fair and to serve as president of the California Mission.

Mission	Organized
California Anaheim Mission^{a}	10 July 1966
California Arcadia Mission^{b}	7 July 1969
California Bakersfield Mission	1 July 2013
California Fresno Mission	1 July 1975
California Los Angeles Mission^{c}	23 Aug 1892
California Modesto Mission	1 July 2015
California Newport Beach Mission^{d}	1 July 1993
California Oakland/San Francisco Mission^{e} ^{f}	1 July 1969
California Oceanside Mission (announced)	1 July 2026
California Ontario Mission (announced)	1 July 2026
California Riverside Mission	1 July 1990
California Roseville Mission	1 July 1993
California Sacramento Mission^{g}	2 Jan 1942
California San Bernardino Mission^{h}	1 July 1980
California San Diego Mission	1 August 1974
California San Jose Mission	1 July 1978
California Santa Rosa Mission	1 July 1985
California Ventura Mission	1 July 1978
California Victorville Mission (announced)	1 July 2026

Notes

- ^{a} California Anaheim Mission - The California South Mission was renamed the California Anaheim Mission on June 20, 1974.
- ^{b} California Arcadia Mission - On June 20, 1974, the California East Mission was renamed California Arcadia Mission.
- ^{c} California Los Angeles Mission - The California Mission was renamed the California Los Angeles Mission on June 20, 1974.
- ^{d} California Newport Beach Mission - The California Irvine Mission was realigned and renamed the California Newport Beach Mission on July 1, 2019.
- ^{e} California Oakland Mission - On June 20, 1974, the California Central Mission was renamed California Oakland Mission. On July 1, 2009, it was renamed the California Oakland/San Francisco Mission after consolidation with the California San Francisco Mission.
- ^{f} California San Francisco Mission - On July 1, 1997, the California San Francisco Mission was created. On July 1, 2009, it was consolidated into the California Oakland Mission. The resulting mission was named the California Oakland/San Francisco Mission.
- ^{g} California Sacramento Mission - On January 2, 1942, the Northern California Mission was organized. It was renamed to the California North mission on July 15, 1966, and ultimately renamed the California Sacramento Mission on June 20, 1974.
- ^{h} The California San Bernardino Mission was named the California Redlands Mission for much of the 2010s.

In addition to these missions, much of the area East of the Sierra Nevada Mountains in California is located in the Nevada Reno Mission.

== Temples ==
Temples in California
Temples in the Los Angeles metropolitan
area
- = Operating
- = Under construction
- = Announced
- = Temporarily Closed

California currently has 9 temples in operation and 2 additional temples announced and one under construction.

10. Los Angeles California Temple; Official website; News & images	
Location: Announced: Groundbreaking: Dedicated: Size: Style:	Los Angeles, California, United States; March 6, 1937 by Heber J. Grant; September 22, 1951 by David O. McKay; March 11, 1956 by David O. McKay; 190,614 sq ft (17,708.6 m^{2}) on a 13-acre (5.3 ha) site Modern, single-tower design - designed by Edward O. Anderson
13. Oakland California Temple; Official website; News & images	
Location: Announced: Groundbreaking: Dedicated: Rededicated: Size: Style:	Oakland, California, United States; January 23, 1961 by David O. McKay; May 26, 1962 by David O. McKay; November 17, 1964 by David O. McKay; June 16, 2019 by Dallin H. Oaks; 80,157 sq ft (7,446.8 m^{2}) on a 18.1-acre (7.3 ha) site Modern, five-spire design - designed by Harold W. Burton
45. San Diego California Temple; Official website; News & images	
Location: Announced: Groundbreaking: Dedicated: Rededicated: Size: Style:	San Diego, California, United States; 7 April 1984 by Gordon B. Hinckley; 27 February 1988 by Ezra Taft Benson; 25 April 1993 by Gordon B. Hinckley; 23 August 2026 by D. Todd Christofferson; 58,005 sq ft (5,388.8 m^{2}) on a 7.2-acre (2.9 ha) site Modern, two main towers - designed by William S. Lewis, Jr.
78. Fresno California Temple; Official website; News & images	
Location: Announced: Groundbreaking: Dedicated: Size: Style:	Fresno, California, United States; January 8, 1999 by Gordon B. Hinckley; March 20, 1999 by John B. Dickson; April 9, 2000 by Gordon B. Hinckley; 10,700 sq ft (990 m^{2}) on a 2.34-acre (0.95 ha) site Classic modern, single-spire design - designed by Paul Stommel AIA
116. Redlands California Temple; Official website; News & images	
Location: Announced: Groundbreaking: Dedicated: Size: Style:	Redlands, California, United States; April 21, 2001 by Gordon B. Hinckley; December 1, 2001 by Dieter F. Uchtdorf; September 14, 2003 by Gordon B. Hinckley; 17,300 sq ft (1,610 m^{2}) on a 4.6-acre (1.9 ha) site Classic modern, single-spire design - designed by Lloyd Platt & Associates with Higginson & Cartozian
122. Newport Beach California Temple; Official website; News & images	
Location: Announced: Groundbreaking: Dedicated: Size: Style:	Newport Beach, California, United States; April 21, 2001 by Gordon B. Hinckley; August 15, 2003 by Duane B. Gerrard; August 28, 2005 by Gordon B. Hinckley; 17,800 sq ft (1,650 m^{2}) on a 8.8-acre (3.6 ha) site Southern California traditional design - designed by Lloyd Platt and Allen Erekson
123. Sacramento California Temple; Official website; News & images	
Location: Announced: Groundbreaking: Dedicated: Size: Style:	Rancho Cordova, California, U.S. April 21, 2001 by Gordon B. Hinckley; August 22, 2004 by Gordon B. Hinckley; September 3, 2006 by Gordon B. Hinckley; 19,500 sq ft (1,810 m^{2}) on a 46-acre (19 ha) site Classic modern, single-spire design - designed by Joseph Marty Architect, Brian Everett and Maury Maher
184. Feather River California Temple; Official website; News & images	
Location: Announced: Groundbreaking: Dedicated: Size:	Yuba City, California, United States; 7 October 2018 by Russell M. Nelson; 18 July 2020 by Paul H. Watkins; 8 October 2023 by Ulisses Soares; 41,665 sq ft (3,870.8 m^{2}) on a 9.24-acre (3.74 ha) site
218. Yorba Linda California Temple; Official website; News & images	
Location: Announced: Groundbreaking: Dedicated: Size:	Yorba Linda, California, United States; 4 April 2021 by Russell M. Nelson; 18 June 2022 by Mark A. Bragg; 7 June 2026 by D. Todd Christofferson; 30,872 sq ft (2,868.1 m^{2}) on a 5.46-acre (2.21 ha) site
231. Modesto California Temple (Dedication scheduled); Official website; News & images	
Location: Announced: Groundbreaking: Open House: Dedicated: Size:	Modesto, California; 3 April 2022 by Russell M. Nelson; 7 October 2023 by Gary B. Sabin; 16-31 October 2026 scheduled for 22 November 2026; 31,352 sq ft (2,912.7 m^{2}) on a 17.63-acre (7.13 ha) site
325. Sunnyvale California Temple (Site announced); Official website; News & images	
Location: Announced: Size: Notes:	Sunnyvale, California, United States; 2 April 2023 by Russell M. Nelson; 30,000 sq ft (2,800 m^{2}) on a 4.73-acre (1.91 ha) site Originally announced as the San Jose California Temple. The temple's name change was confirmed on December 15, 2025,
326. Bakersfield California Temple (Site announced); Official website; News & images	
Location: Announced: Size:	Bakersfield, California, United States; 2 April 2023 by Russell M. Nelson; 30,000 sq ft (2,800 m^{2}) on a 13.07-acre (5.29 ha) site

== Communities ==
Latter-Day saints had founded a few communities throughout California, including in the "Mormon Corridor".

Folsom

Oakland

San Bernardino

Victorville

== See also ==
- Religion in California
- Mormon Corridor
- The Church of Jesus Christ of Latter-day Saints membership statistics (United States)
