= Redlands California Temple =

Temple of the Church of Jesus Christ of Latter-day Saints

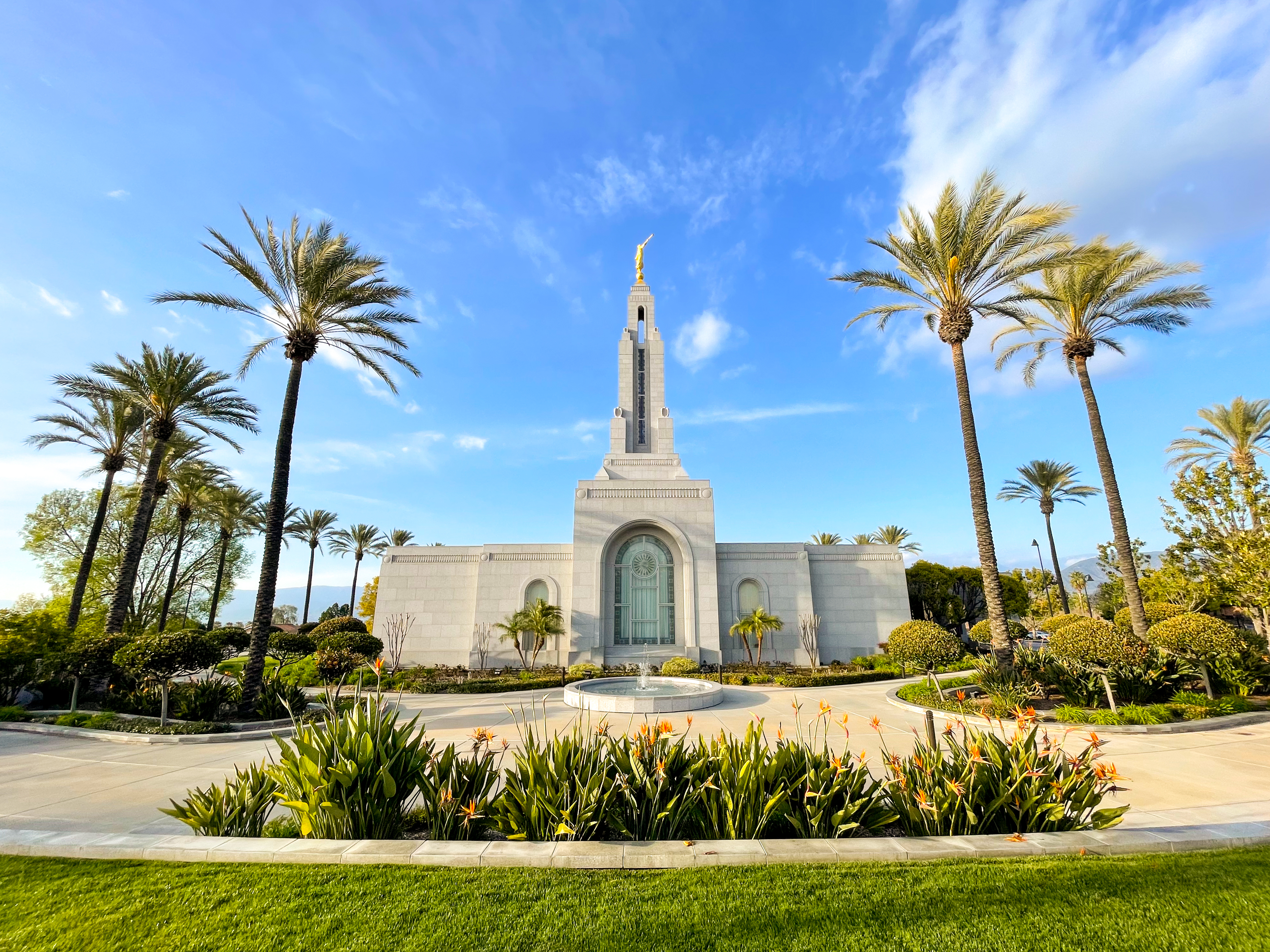
- Interactive map of Redlands California Temple
- Number: 116
- Dedication: September 14, 2003, by Gordon B. Hinckley
- Site: 4.6 acres (1.9 ha)
- Floor area: 17,300 ft^{2} (1,610 m^{2})
- Official website • News & images

Church chronology
← Brisbane Australia Temple	Redlands California Temple	→ Accra Ghana Temple

Additional information
- Announced: April 21, 2001, by Gordon B. Hinckley
- Groundbreaking: December 1, 2001, by Dieter F. Uchtdorf
- Open house: August 9 – September 6, 2003
- Current president: Scott Bishop
- Designed by: Lloyd Platt & Associates with Higginson & Cartozian
- Location: Redlands, California, United States
- Coordinates: 34°2′56.5″N 117°8′26.1″W
- Exterior finish: Light gray granite
- Design: Classic modern, single-spire design
- Baptistries: 1
- Ordinance rooms: 2 (movie, two-stage progressive)
- Sealing rooms: 3

The Redlands California Temple is the 116th operating temple of the Church of Jesus Christ of Latter-day Saints. The intent to construct the temple was announced April 21, 2001, by the church's First Presidency. The temple is the fifth in California. The temple has a single attached spire with a statue of the angel Moroni. The temple was designed by Lloyd Platt & Associates with associate firm Higginson & Cartozian, showcasing a Southern California traditional architectural style. A groundbreaking ceremony, to signify the beginning of construction, was held on December 1, 2001, conducted by Dieter F. Uchtdorf.

== History ==
The intent to construct a temple Redlands, California was announced on April 21, 2001. Redlands is in the San Bernardino, California area, which since 1851 has had a large population of Latter-day Saints, some of whom are descendants of colonists that first established the community. The original community was established with the encouragement of church president Brigham Young but the settlers were called back to Utah in 1857.

The site for the Redlands California Temple was dedicated in December 2001 and construction began soon after. Church members helped in the construction by donating rocks for its building. Some of these rocks were from the area where the original Latter-day Saint colonists of 1851 camped. Young children also donated their pennies to buy the palm trees that are now planted around the temple. The temple sits on 4.6 acres (19,000 m^{2}) and is 17,300 square feet (1,610 m^{2}). It has two ordinance rooms and three sealing rooms.

After construction was completed, a public open house was held from August 9 through September 6, 2003. About 11,000 people volunteered to help with the open house and more than 140,000 people toured the temple and learn more about its purpose. The temple was built on a lot that was originally home to an orange grove; during the open house some guests were served orange juice made from the orange trees that once stood there.

Church president Gordon B. Hinckley dedicated the Redlands California Temple on September 14, 2003. About 23,000 members attended the four dedication services. The Redlands temple was the fifth to be built in California, and as of 2010, serves approximately 70,000 members in the area.

In 2020, like all the church's others, the Redlands California Temple was closed for a time in response to the COVID-19 pandemic.

== Design and architecture ==
The building has a Southern California traditional architectural style, and was designed by Lloyd Platt & Associates, with associate firm Higginson & Cartozian. The temple's architecture reflects both the cultural heritage of the San Bernardino area and its spiritual significance to the church.

The temple is on a 4.55-acre plot, and the surrounding landscaping has a fountain, palm trees, flowers, and shrubs. These elements are designed to provide a tranquil setting to enhance the sacred atmosphere of the site.

The structure stands 130 feet tall, constructed with light gray granite. The exterior has three arched windows on the front of the temple, chosen for its symbolic significance and alignment with temple traditions. The design incorporates elements that are reflective of both the local culture and the broader church symbolism.

The temple includes two instruction rooms, three sealing rooms, and a baptistry, each designed for ceremonial use.

The design has symbolic elements representing Latter-day Saint symbolism, to provide deeper spiritual meaning to its appearance and function. Symbolism is important to church members and includes the angel Moroni statue, which symbolizes “the restoration of the gospel of Jesus Christ.”

== Temple presidents ==
The church's temples are directed by a temple president and matron, each serving for a term of three years. The president and matron oversee the administration of temple operations and provide guidance and training for both temple patrons and staff.

Serving from 2003 to 2006, the first president of the Redlands California Temple was Rodney J. Nelson, with Arleen E. Nelson as matron. As of 2024, Gregory S. Bishop is the president, with Nadette J. Bishop serving as matron.

== Admittance ==
On June 21, 2003, the church announced the public open house that was held from August 9 to September 3, 2003 (excluding Sundays). The temple was dedicated by Gordon B. Hinckley on September 14, 2003, in four sessions.

Like all the church's temples, it is not used for Sunday worship services. To members of the church, temples are regarded as sacred houses of the Lord. Once dedicated, only church members with a current temple recommend can enter for worship.

== See also ==
Temples in California
Los Angeles Temples
Temples in the Los Angeles metropolitan
area
- = Operating
- = Under construction
- = Announced
- = Temporarily closed

- Comparison of temples of The Church of Jesus Christ of Latter-day Saints
- List of temples of The Church of Jesus Christ of Latter-day Saints
- List of temples of The Church of Jesus Christ of Latter-day Saints by geographic region
- Temple architecture (Latter-day Saints)
- The Church of Jesus Christ of Latter-day Saints in California
