= Ordinance room =

Part of a Latter-day Saint temple

In temples of the Church of Jesus Christ of Latter-day Saints (LDS Church), an ordinance room is a room where the ceremony known as the Endowment is administered, as well as other ordinances such as Sealings. Some temples perform a progressive-style ordinance where patrons move from room to room, each room representing a progression of mankind: the Creation room, representing the Genesis creation story; the Garden room represents the Garden of Eden where Adam and Eve lived prior to the fall of man; the World room, where Adam and Eve lived after the fall; the Terrestrial room; and the Celestial room representing the Celestial Kingdom of God, or more commonly, heaven. There is also an additional ordinance room, the Sealing room, and at least one temple has a Holy of Holies. These two rooms are reserved for the administration of ordinances beyond the Endowment.

== Development of ordinance rooms ==
The first building to have ordinance rooms, designed to conduct the Endowment, was Joseph Smith's store in Nauvoo, Illinois, in 1842. Using canvas, Smith divided the store's large, second-floor room into "departments," which represented "the interior of a temple as much as circumstances would permit" (Anderson & Bergera, Quorum of Anointed, 2). The departments included a garden with potted plants and a veil. (Anderson & Bergera, Quorum of Anointed, 3–4). After conducting the endowment services, Smith told Brigham Young, "This is not arranged right but we have done the best we could under the circumstances in which we are placed." Smith concluded that he wanted Young to "organize and systemize all these ceremonies." (Anderson & Bergera, Quorum of Anointed, 6–7). After Smith's death in 1844, Young also used canvas to divide the large attic room in the Nauvoo Temple in the departments. Participants in the Nauvoo Temple ceremonies used the same names for these departments as the ordinance rooms in later temples: Garden Room, World Room, Terrestrial Room, Celestial Room, and Sealing Room, which was also called the Holy of Holies. (Anderson & Bergera, Endowment Companies, 2–4, 377; Smith, 204–206). With the resumption of temple ordinances in Salt Lake City in the 1850s, Young followed the same method of using canvas to divide an upper floor of the Council House into the ordinance departments (Hyde, 90–99).

The above arrangement for administering the Endowment consisted of only temporary modifications to a building's interior rooms; obviously canvas partitions were not meant to be permanent. The first building to be designed specifically with actual progressive-style ordinance rooms for presentation of the Endowment was the Endowment House built in 1855 on Temple Square. This structure had the same rooms as the Nauvoo Temple and Council House, including a Garden Room with murals and potted evergreen plants, but the sealing room was not called the Holy of Holies (Tingen, 10). However, when the St. George Temple was completed in 1877, Young followed the Nauvoo Temple pattern of using "frame petitions [sic., partitions] with the curtains and doors" for Endowment rooms (McKinney, 7:305). Apparently, the rooms were later made more permanent in 1881, when a group of Utah artists painted murals on the walls (O'Brien, 14–15).

== Four-room progressive style ==
Perhaps, using the precedent of the rooms in Endowment House and St. George, architect Truman O. Angell Jr., specifically designed the Logan Temple interior with progressive ordinance rooms; the first temple so designed, which was dedicated in 1884. Manti Temple architect William Folsom, followed the same arrangement for that temple, which was dedicated in 1888. Based on his experience with the Logan Temple, Angell petitioned church president John Taylor to override Young's original design for the Salt Lake Temple's interior with progressive ordinance rooms, which Taylor enthusiastically approved (Salt Lake Temple, 54–55). This became the pattern for all temples until the construction of the Swiss Temple, when non-progressive ordinance rooms were developed to incorporate the new filmed Endowment ceremony (Buerger, 166).

The following description of the various rooms is based on James E. Talmage's The House of the Lord, which is typical of similar rooms in other LDS Church temples. These ordinance rooms reflect the overall temple ceremonies, which is an overview of God's plan for humanity. Beginning with the creation, the endowment reviews man's mortal existence, and what one must do in order to return to God's presence as husband and wife with their children.

=== Creation room ===
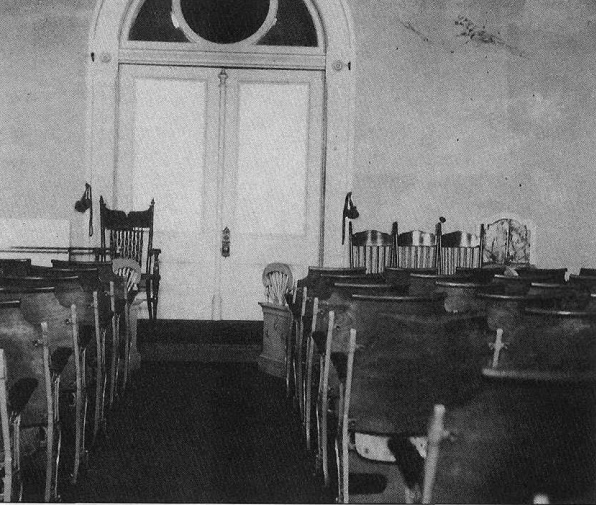
The Creation (or Lecture) Room

This room generally has "murals on the walls [which] are subdued in tones, and depict scenes representative of the creation of the earth" as recorded in Genesis. It has no altar, only comfortable theater seating (Talmage, 204). In this room temple patrons "learn about the creation of the world" (Temples, 11).

=== Garden room ===
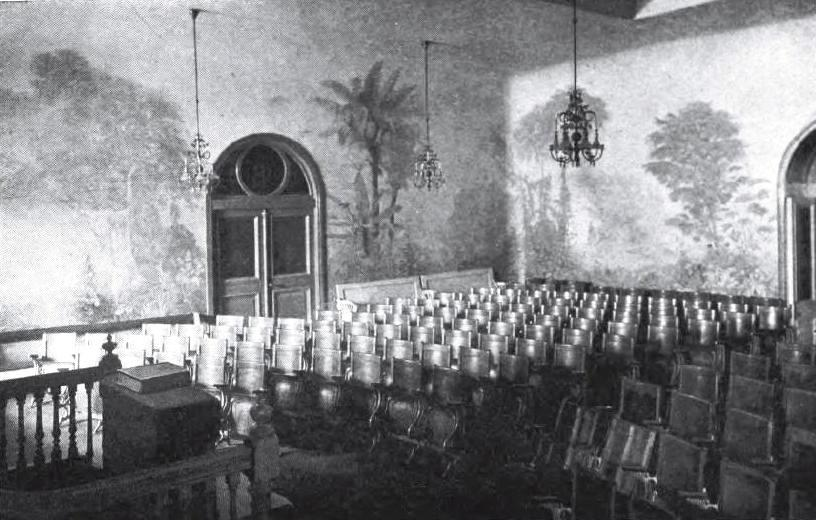
Salt Lake Temple Garden Room

This room has murals "showing landscape of rare beauty." The murals depict scenes such as "sylvan grottos and mossy dells, lakelets and brooks, waterfalls and rivulets, trees, vines and flowers, insects, birds and beasts, in short, the earth beautiful, as it was before the Fall of Adam and Eve. It may be called the Garden of Eden Room." It has an altar and theater seating (Talmage, 204–205). In this room temple patrons learn "about our first parents being placed in the Garden of Eden....how Satan tempted Adam and Eve, and how they were cast out of the garden and out of the presence of God into our world" (Temples, 11).

=== Telestial (or World) room ===
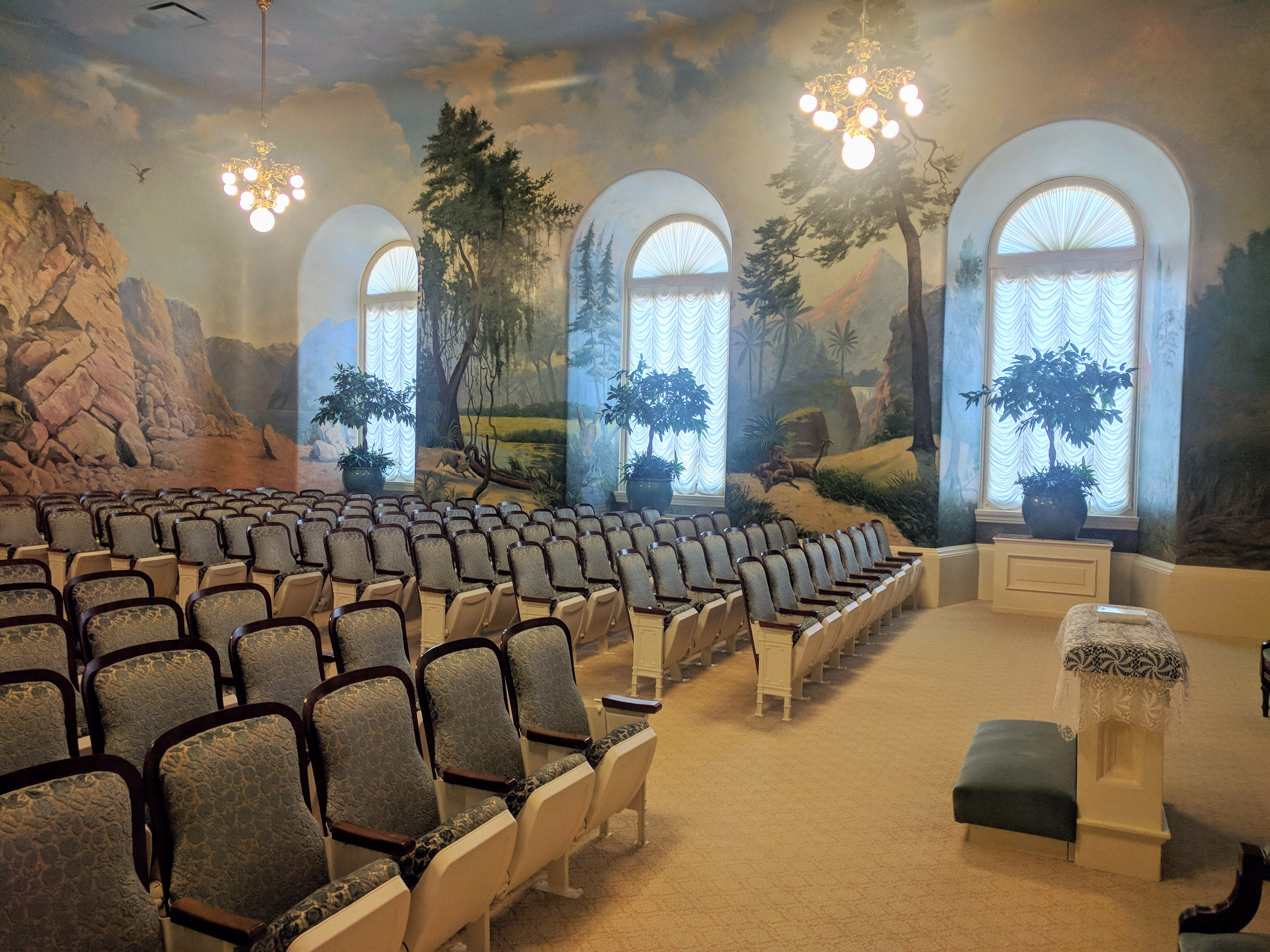
Salt Lake Temple World room/Telestial Room

This room's murals stand "in strong contrast to with those of the Garden Room." The "rocks are rent and riven" with "gnarled trees, misshapen, and blasted; shrubs maintain a precarious roothold in rocky clefts; thorns, thistles, cacti, and noxious weeds abound," and the animals depicted "are living under the ever-present menace of death" The scenes depicts the "lone and dreary world," where Adam and Eve "[have] been driven out to meet contention, to struggle with difficulties, [and] to live by strife and sweat" in a "fallen world." It has an altar and theater seating (Talmage, 205–206). In this room temple patrons "learn about the joys as well as the discomforts of life,...[where they are taught the gospel and enter into covenants of obedience with God" (Temples, 11).

=== Terrestrial room ===
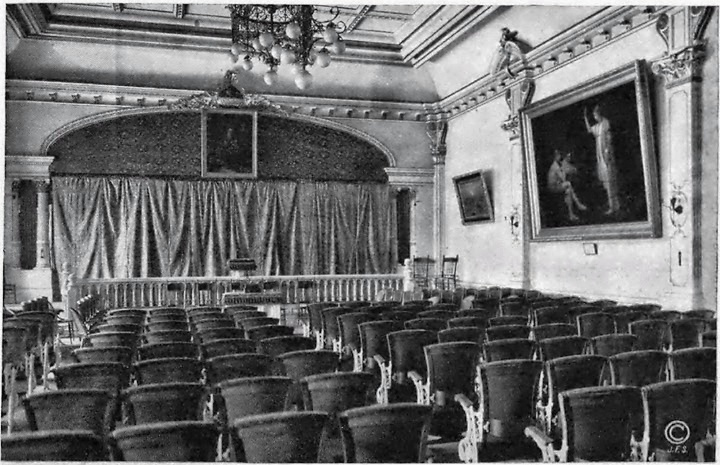
Salt Lake Temple Terrestrial room and veil

This room has no murals, but is "restful in its soft coloring and air of comfort." Its appointments "combine richness and simplicity," often including elaborately framed mirrors and paintings, and crystal chandeliers. "For convenience [this room is] designated the Terrestrial Room." In this room "lectures are given pertaining to the endowments" (Talmage, 206–207).

=== Celestial room ===
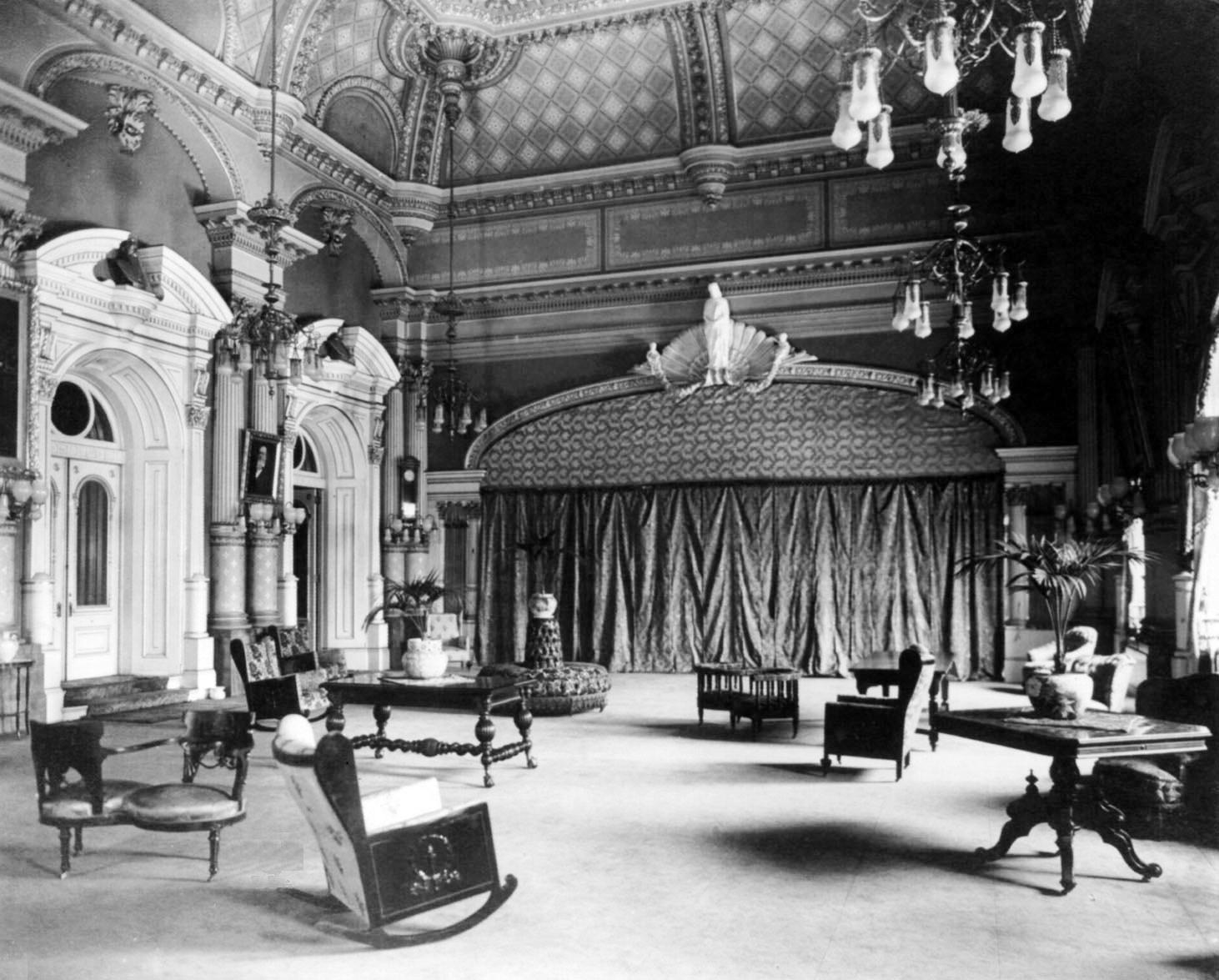
Salt Lake Temple Celestial room

The veil separates this room from the Terrestrial Room. Again, this room has no murals, but "in finish and furnishings it is the grandest of all the large [ordinance] rooms within the walls" of the temple. Like the Terrestrial Room it has large mirrors, paintings, and chandeliers, but it is more "suggestive of conditions yet more exalted." Instead of theater-style seating for instruction it has tables with floral arrangements as well as comfortable sofas and chairs (Talmadge, 207–209). The Celestial Room "symbolizes life as eternal families with our Heavenly Father and His Son, Jesus Christ", and represents the glory of the highest degree of heaven. (Temple brochure, LDS Church). The Celestial Room is so called because it is symbolic of the Celestial Kingdom in LDS theology. Thus, the Celestial Room is a quiet and reverent place, where individuals may pause to pray, read the scriptures, and discuss amongst themselves. In most LDS temples, celestial rooms are elegant, beautiful, and brighter in decor than other parts of the temple.

== Single ordinance room style ==
From the 1950s until 2002, LDS Church temples were built with between one and six ordinance rooms, any one of which could accommodate the entire endowment ceremony, combining the functions of the four progressive-style rooms. When the Nauvoo Illinois Temple was built in 2002, it was designed with progressive ordinance rooms, apparently as a tribute to the original Nauvoo temple (2005 Church Almanac, 495–555).

== Two-room progressive style ==
Temples built since 2002 have generally paired two ordinance rooms together. In this arrangement, the first room combines the functions of the Creation, Garden, and World rooms, while the second serves as the Terrestrial room, thus restoring part of the progressive style of earlier temples. However, no matter the number or arrangement of ordinances rooms, the Celestial room is always a separate room, which culminates the Endowment experience. After the Endowment is a culmination of the temple rites administered in the Sealing Room and the Holy of Holies.

== Sealing room ==
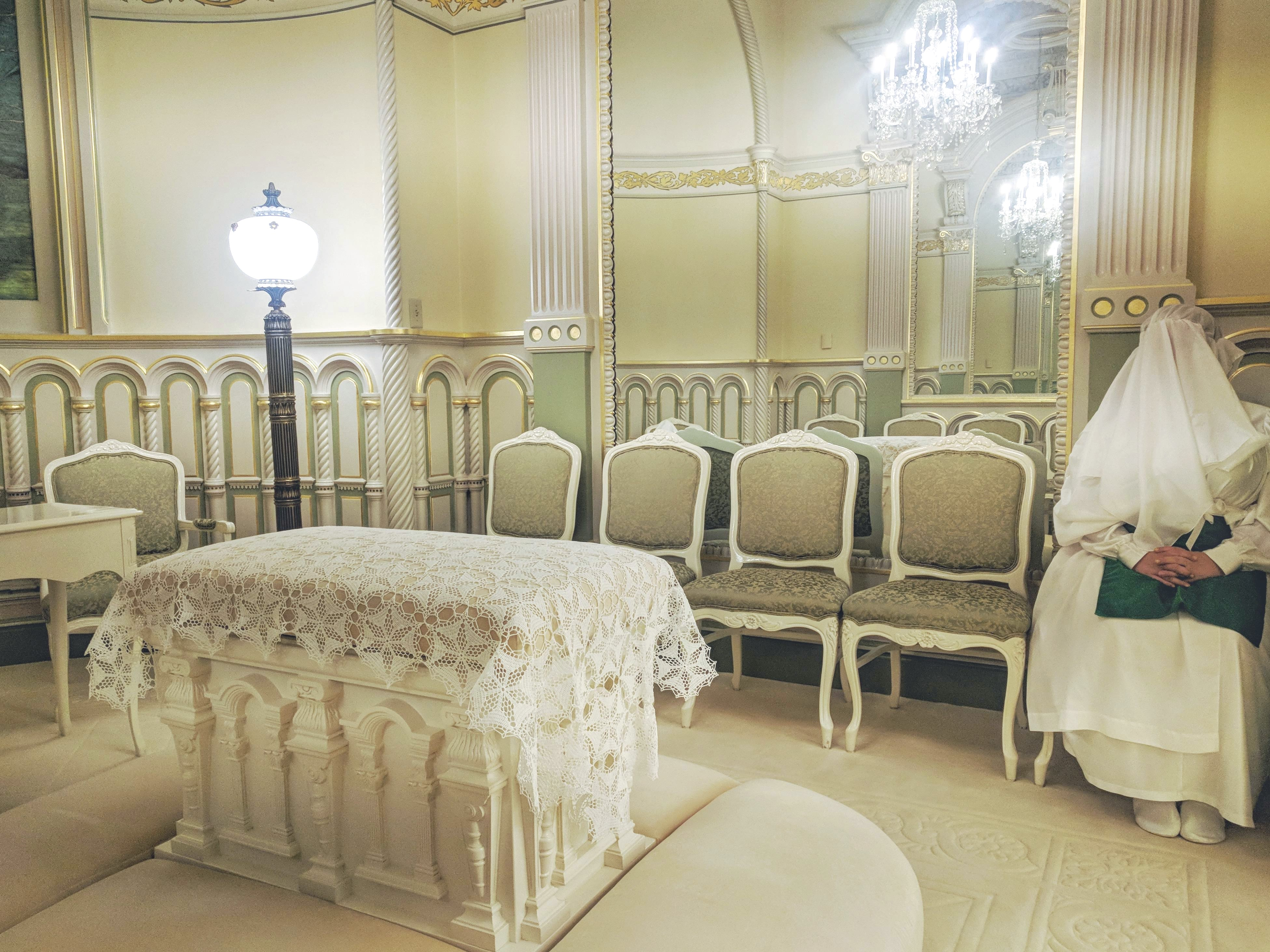
A woman in ceremonial temple garb used during the wedding ceremony sits next to the sealing room altar over which the sealings are performed. The infinite reflection of the double mirrors is seen in the background.

All temples have at least one Sealing Room, and most temples have two or more. Sealing rooms come in a variety of sizes from small to large to accommodate varying numbers of people. Each room is dominated by a large "richly upholstered altar." Around the room are comfortable chairs and sofas. The "walls are of light tint," and generally on two of the walls are large mirrors, opposite each other. In this room "is solemnized the sacred ordinance of marriage between the parties who come to plight their vows of marital fidelity for time and eternity" (Talmage, 208–209).

== Holy of Holies ==
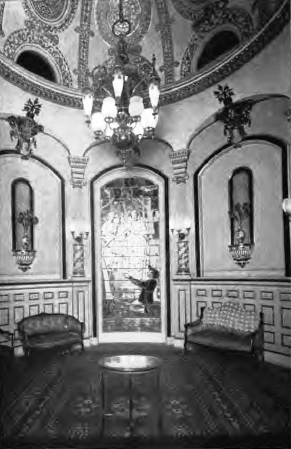
The Salt Lake Temple Holy of Holies, as it appeared in the early 20th century.

The only temple with a room designated as the Holy of Holies is the Salt Lake Temple. Boyd K. Packer said that “hidden away in the central part of the temple is the Holy of Holies, where the President of the Church may retire when burdened down with heavy decisions to seek an interview with Him whose Church it is. The prophet holds the keys, the spiritual keys and the very literal key to this one door in that sacred edifice.”

Of all the rooms in the Salt Lake Temple, this circular room is "by far the most beautiful" with "splendid simplicity rather than of sumptuous splendor". Its ceiling is domed and fitted with circular and semi-circular windows. Its doorway "corresponds to the inner curtain or veil that shielded from public view the most sacred precincts" of earlier temples. Opposite the doorway is a large stained glass window depicting Joseph Smith's First Vision. The room has an altar, chairs and sofas. The Holy of Holies "is reserved for the higher ordinances in the priesthood relating to the exaltation of both the living and the dead." In temples without a Holy of Holies these ordinances are administered in one of the Sealing Rooms, which is dedicated as a temporary Holy of Holies.

== See also ==
- Ordinance (Latter Day Saints)
- Temple architecture (Latter-day Saints)
