= Antofagasta Chile Temple =

- Interactive map of Antofagasta Chile Temple
- Number: 207
- Dedication: 15 June 2025, by Gary E. Stevenson
- Site: 2 acres (0.81 ha)
- Floor area: 26,163 ft^{2} (2,430.6 m^{2})
- Official website • News & images

Church chronology
| ← Syracuse Utah Temple | Antofagasta Chile Temple | → Farmington New Mexico Temple |

Additional information
- Announced: 7 April 2019, by Russell M. Nelson
- Groundbreaking: 27 November 2020, by Juan Pablo Villar
- Open house: 14-24 May 2025
- Current president: Claudio A. González Salamanca
- Location: Antofagasta, Chile
- Coordinates: 23°34′18″S 70°23′40″W

The Antofagasta Chile Temple is a temple of the Church of Jesus Christ of Latter-day Saints located in Antofagasta, a port city in northern Chile. Church president Russell M. Nelson announced plans to construct the temple on April 7, 2019, during general conference, one of eight announced at that time. It is the third operating temple in Chile, following those in Santiago and Concepción, and is one of six in the country, with those announced or under construction in Santiago West, Viña del Mar, and Puerto Montt. Ground was broken for the temple on November 27, 2020, with Juan Pablo Villar, a general authority and presidency member of the South America South Area, presiding. It is a two-story building on a 2-acre site at Avenida Las Palmeras and Calle Jaime Padrely in Antofagasta. After construction was completed, a public open house was held from May 14 through May 24, 2025, excluding Sundays, and the temple was dedicated on June 15, 2025, by Gary E. Stevenson of the Quorum of the Twelve Apostles.

== History ==
The construction announcement in 2019 was part of the church’s effort to expand temple access for members in northern Chile, who previously had to travel more than 800 miles to Santiago. At the time, Chile had more than 610,000 Latter-day Saints in nearly 580 congregations.

The church's first presence in northern Chile dates to the late 1920s, when a family settled in the region to work in mining and organized a Primary program for children. Several families from the United States later built a chapel, and the Arica Branch was established in 1956 under the South Andean Mission, which covered parts of Peru and Bolivia. Church missionaries arrived in Antofagasta in 1966, and the first stake was organized in 1980. As of 2026, the Antofagasta Chile Temple serves church members in eight stakes and one district..

=== Groundbreaking ===
The groundbreaking ceremony on November 27, 2020, was presided over by Juan Pablo Villar. Attendance was limited due to COVID-19 restrictions, but several local officials participated, including Antofagasta Governor Nanto Espinoza and the city’s interim mayor. During the ceremony, Villar emphasized preparing a firm foundation to withstand seismic activity, a common occurrence in the region, and encouraged members to similarly strengthen their personal spiritual foundations. Local youth and community members shared testimonies, expressing gratitude for the temple and its role in uniting families and strengthening faith.

=== Open house and dedication ===
After construction was completed, a media day was held on May 12, 2025, followed by tours for invited guests on May 13. A public open house was held from May 14 through May 24, 2025, excluding Sundays. The tour included the sealing rooms, baptistry, and instruction rooms. Attendees reported experiencing spiritual reflection and an understanding of the eternal nature of families. Archbishop Ignacio Francisco Ducasse Medina of the Antofagasta Archdiocese also toured the temple, noting its spiritual symbolism and community value.

The temple was dedicated on June 15, 2025, by Gary E. Stevenson of the Quorum of the Twelve Apostles, with the dedicatory session broadcast to all congregations in the temple district. The dedication coincided with centennial celebrations of the church's entrance in South America.

== Design and architecture ==
The temple is a two-story structure of approximately 26,200 square feet. The exterior is Turkish limestone, with a single tower over the main entrance. The interior design reflects the coastal environment, using geometric patterns inspired by the sea. with colors in the interior and exterior using blues and whites representing the northern Chilean desert sky, and blues and oranges are also used in the art glass.

Interior finishes include Crema Marfil marble flooring, gold leafing, and blue-and-coral stencil work along upper bays and ceilings. Millwork and doors are made of African sapele wood. The temple has two instruction rooms, a baptistry, and two sealing rooms. The design emphasizes both spiritual symbolism and harmony with the surrounding coastal landscape, making it distinct among Chilean temples.

== Temple leadership and admittance ==
The church's temples are directed by a temple president and matron, each typically serving for a term of three years. The president and matron oversee the administration of temple operations and provide guidance and training for both temple patrons and staff. As of 2025, Claudio A. González Salamanca is the president, with Yolanda P. de González serving as matron.

The public toured the temple during its open house. Like all the church's temples, it is not used for Sunday worship services. To members of the church, temples are regarded as sacred houses of the Lord. Once dedicated, only church members with a current temple recommend can enter for worship.

== See also ==
Temples in Chile
- = Operating
- = Under construction
- = Announced
- = Temporarily Closed
- The Church of Jesus Christ of Latter-day Saints in Chile
- Comparison of temples (LDS Church)
- List of temples (LDS Church)
- List of temples by geographic region (LDS Church)
- Temple architecture (LDS Church)
