= Jafetz Jaim Synagogue =

Synagogue in Santiago, Chile

Jafetz Chaim Synagogue
- Spanish: Sinagoga Jafetz Jaim
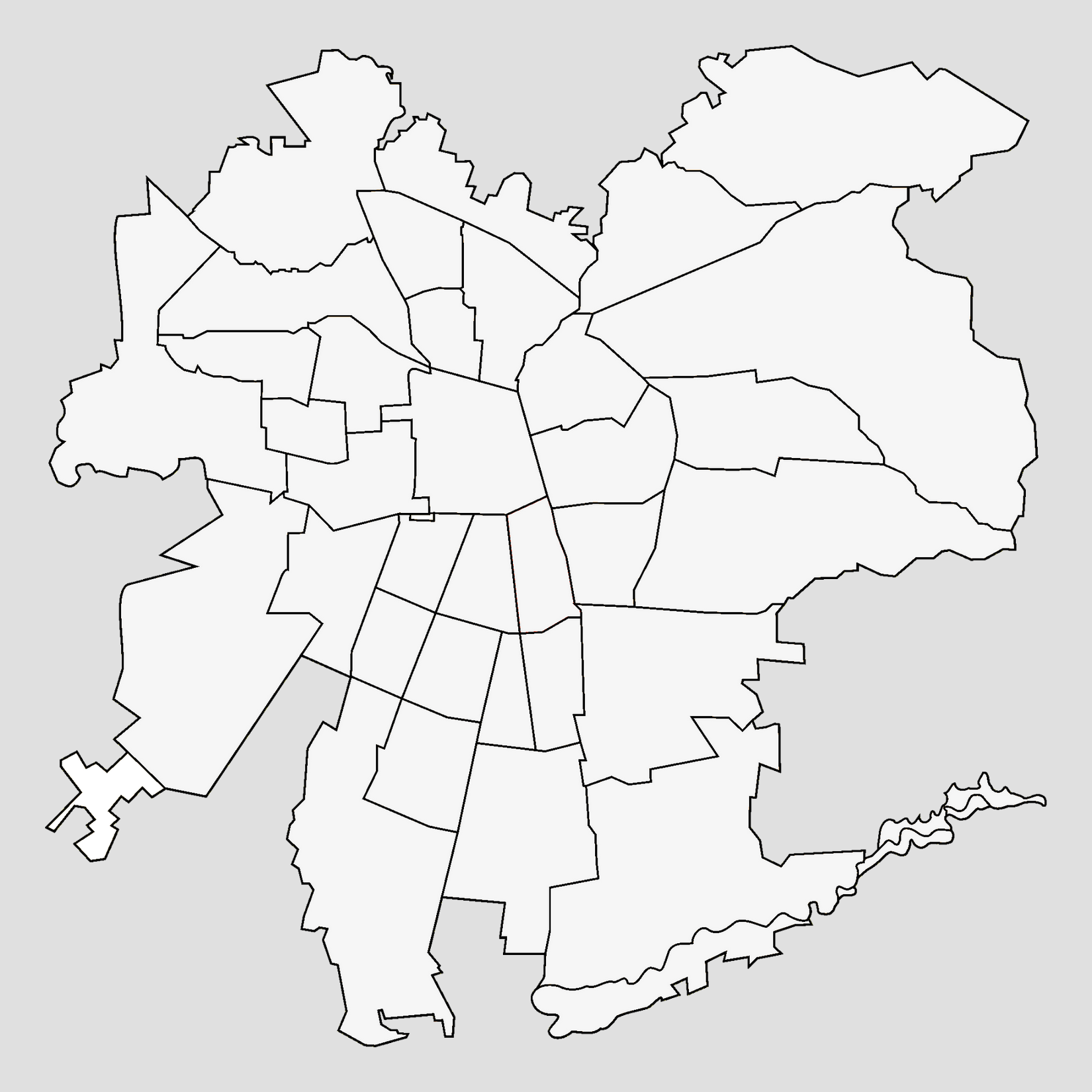
- Location of the synagogue in Santiago

Religion
- Affiliation: Orthodox Judaism
- Ecclesiastical or organizational status: Synagogue
- Status: Active

Location
- Location: Las Condes, Santiago
- Country: Chile
- Interactive map of Jafetz Chaim Synagogue
- Coordinates: 33°22′08″S 70°30′06″W

The Jafetz Chaim Synagogue (Spanish: Sinagoga Jafetz Jaim) is an Orthodox Jewish congregation and synagogue, located in Santiago, Chile.

The synagogue has two rabbis and offers daily religious services and celebrations of the Jewish calendar.

== See also ==
- History of the Jews in Chile
- List of synagogues in South America
