= Trumbull manuscripts =

Trumbull manuscripts may refer to:

- The manuscript collection of David Trumbull (1819–1889) at Princeton Theological Seminary
- The manuscript collection of William Trumbull (1639–1716) at the British Library
- The manuscript collection of Benjamin Trumbull (1735–1820) at the Yale Library
