= Jewish Community of Chile =

- Comunidad Judía de Chile
- Abbreviation: CJCh
- Legal status: Religious community
- Region served: Chile
- Official language: Spanish
- Leader: Gerardo Gorodischer T.
- Website: https://www.cjch.cl/

The Jewish Community of Chile (Spanish: Comunidad Judía de Chile, CJCh) is an organization of Jews in Chile. The Jewish Community of Chile is a non-profit organisation. As of 2022 Gerardo Gorodischer is its president.

== See also ==
- Israelite Circle of Santiago
- History of the Jews in Chile
