= History of the Jews in Chile =

Jews in Chile
Judíos en Chile (Spanish) יהודים בצ'ילה (Hebrew) אידן אין טשילע (Yiddish)
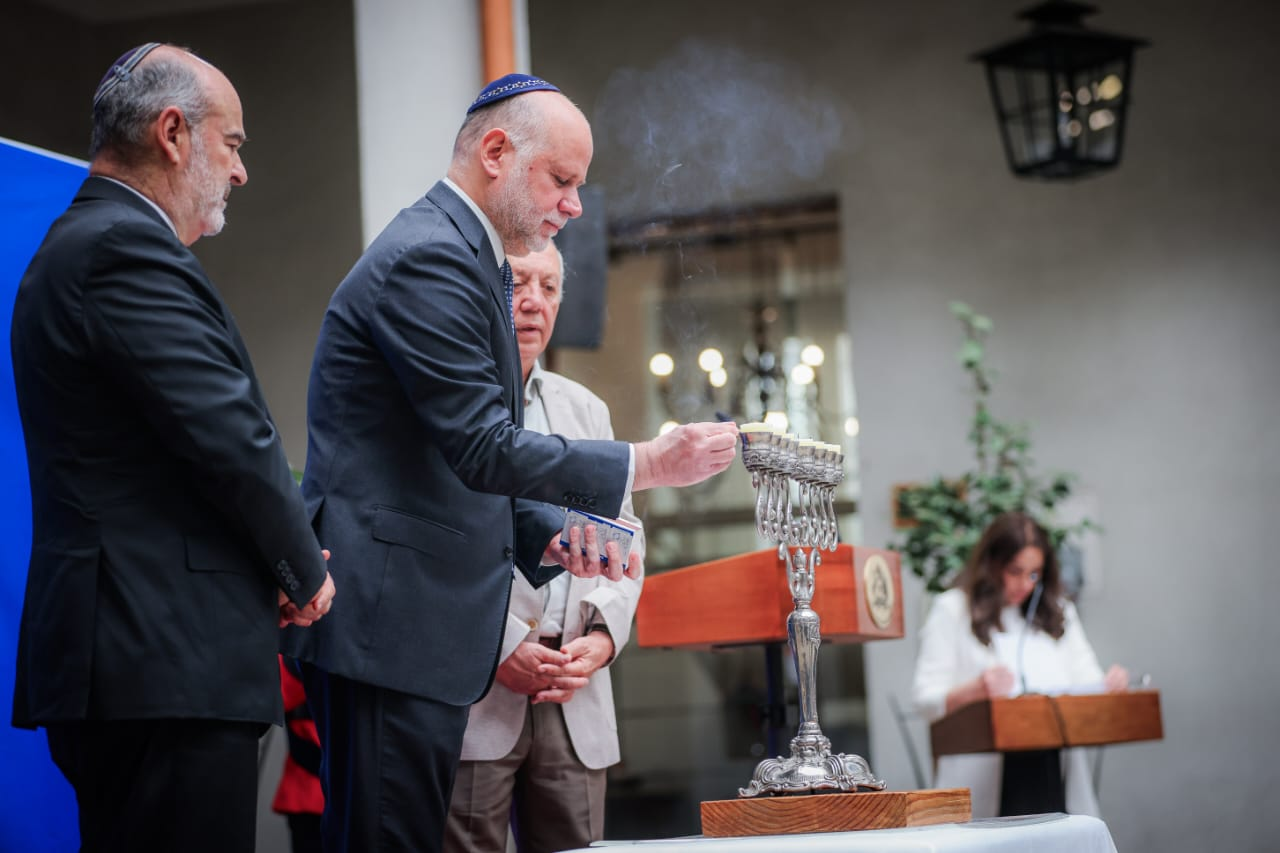
- Hanukkah at La Moneda Palace, 2025

Total population
- 28,153 (Note: The Chilean census exclusively focuses on Jews as a religion, and therefore, non-religious ethnic Jews are not included in the data. Furthermore, the question about religion in the census applies only to the population over 15 years of age, so the Jewish population could be even larger.) (2024 census); 150,000–175,000 (descendants, est. 2010–2011)

Regions with significant populations
- Santiago, Valparaíso

Languages
- Chilean Spanish, Hebrew, Yiddish, Ladino

Religion
- Judaism

Related ethnic groups
- Argentine Jews

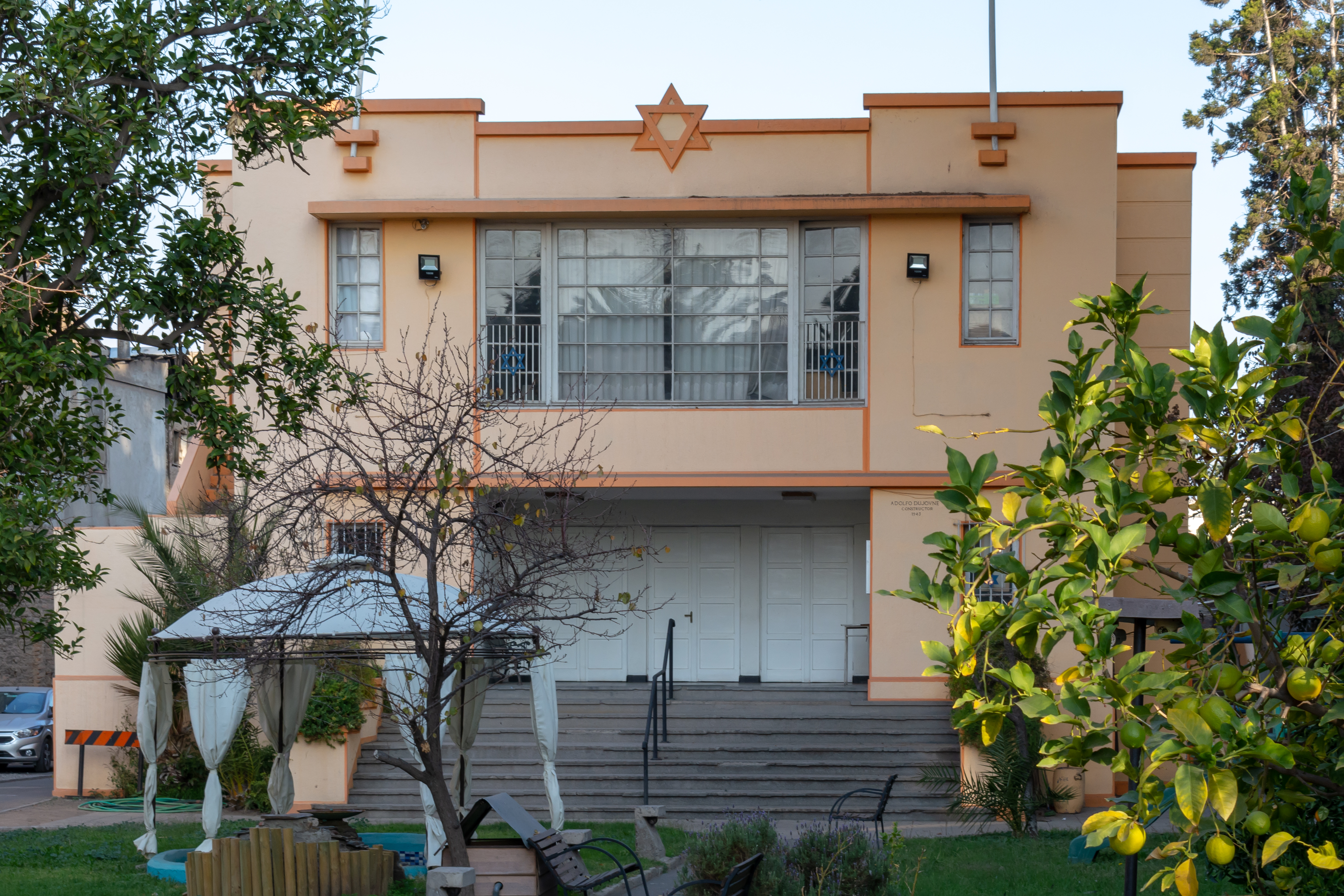
Bicur Joilim, the oldest synagogue in the Chilean capital

The history of the Jews in Chile dates back to the arrival of Europeans to the country. Over time, Chile has received several contingents of Jewish immigrants. Currently, the Jewish community in Chile comes mainly from the migrations occurring in the 19th and 20th centuries, mostly of Ashkenazi background.

Chile is home to the third-largest Jewish community in South America, with an estimated population of 28,153 people practicing Judaism as of 2024, representing about 0.2% of the total Chilean population. Most of the community is concentrated in Santiago, with smaller groups in other regions. Local sources estimated in 2010 and 2011 that the number of people of Jewish descent ranged from 150,000 to 175,000, making it one of the largest Jewish communities in South America after Argentina and Brazil. Foreign sources, however, estimate that the total number of Chileans with Jewish ancestry is roughly 18,300 as of 2019.

== History ==
=== Spanish colonization and settlement ===
The first Jews arrived in Chile with the Spanish conquistadors, seeking to flee the religious persecution of the Spanish Inquisition. Many had converted to Catholicism to hide their Jewish origins. The majority of Jews immigrated to the Americas in the early years of the conquest because the Inquisition had not yet reached there. Diego García de Cáceres, faithful friend and executor of the founder of Santiago, Pedro de Valdivia, was one of them.

In colonial times, the most prominent Jewish character in Chile was the surgeon Francisco Maldonado da Silva, one of the first directors of the San Juan de Dios Hospital. Maldonado da Silva was an Argentine Jew born in San Miguel de Tucumán into a Sephardic family from Portugal. He was accused by the Inquisition Tribunal of attempting to convert devout Christians nurses to Judaism. Maldonado openly declared that he was a Jew, and was sentenced to be burned at the stake - auto-da-fé - in 1639.

Entire Crypto-Jewish families, who had publicly converted to Catholicism but privately remained Jews, arrived. Like in the rest of Latin America, the original Jewish settlers did not retain their identity over the generations and were eventually assimilated into the broader majority of the Chilean Catholic society. As such, the Jewish community of Chile today only really begins with the Jewish immigrations of the 19th century.

=== Jewish immigration in the 19th and 20th centuries ===
From 1840, decades after the abolition of the Inquisition in Chile, began the Jewish immigration to the country. The first Jews who arrived in Valparaíso were from Europe, especially from Germany and France. One of them, Manuel de Lima y Sola, was a man who became one of the founding members of the Fire Department of Valparaíso in 1851 and one of the founders of the Chilean freemasonry to create the first Masonic lodge, the "Unión Fraternal" two years later.

In the late 1800s, Chile experienced small-scale Jewish immigration from Europe and the Levant. Russian Jews sought refuge in Chile following the 1881–1882 pogroms. The southern mining districts also saw the arrival of Eastern European Jews, as well as Sephardic Jews from Smyrna, Istanbul, Monastir, and Salonika, due to economic hardship and discrimination. Valparaíso and Santiago also received Sephardic Jews, along with Jews from Jerusalem, Beirut, and Damascus.

In 1909, the Israelite Union Society of Chile (in Spanish: Sociedad Unión Israelita de Chile) was founded as the first Jewish institution in Chile.

Many Jews left Chile in the 1970s and 1980s. In 1961, the Jewish population was about 30,000, but by 1997 the population had dwindled to 15,000.

=== 21st century ===
The first-ever Jewish chaplain of the chapel at La Moneda Palace, rabbi Eduardo Waingortin, was appointed in 2012 by President Sebastián Piñera.

== Demographics ==
The 1922 census of Mandatory Palestine, conducted by the British authorities, counted 3 Palestinian Jews living in Chile.

The 2012 Chilean census showed 16,294 Jews living in the country, marking an 8.8% increase from the decade before. These figures were questioned by the Chilean Jewish community. By 2024, the Jewish population increased to 28,153, representing 0.2% of the country's total inhabitants. However, the Chilean census does not collect information on ethnic groups other than the country's Indigeonus peoples, and therefore, the data count as Jews only those aged 15 or older who practice Judaism; secular Jews and people of Jewish descent are not included. In 2010 and 2011, the Chilean Jewish community estimated that there were around 25,000 religious Jews in Chile and around 150,000 people of Jewish ancestry, bringing the total estimated Chilean Jewish population to 175,000. According to the 2019 report of the American Jewish Year Book, the estimated total number of people of Jewish ancestry in Chile was roughly 18,300, defined as individuals having at least one Jewish parent or grandparent, as well as the spouses of such persons.

In Israel, almost all Chileans living there are Jews who made aliyah and their descendants. A 2016 report compiled by the Directorate for the Chilean Community Abroad (DICOEX) and the National Statistics Institute of Chile counted 5,480 Chileans living in Israel, making it the largest Chilean community in Asia.

== Community institutions ==
Orthodox Judaism reaches approximately ten percent of Chile's Jewish community.

The Chabad movement was first established in Chile in 1981 and has since constructed synagogues, schools and recreational centers.

In 2016, the Jewish Archive of Chile was founded, a collection of written and audiovisual material about Jews living in the country. It was declared a Historical Monument in 2022.

== See also ==
- Immigration to Chile
- Religion in Chile
- Benei Sión
- Antisemitism in Chile
