= The Church of Jesus Christ of Latter-day Saints in Chile =

Second Largest Religion

- (Logo in Spanish)

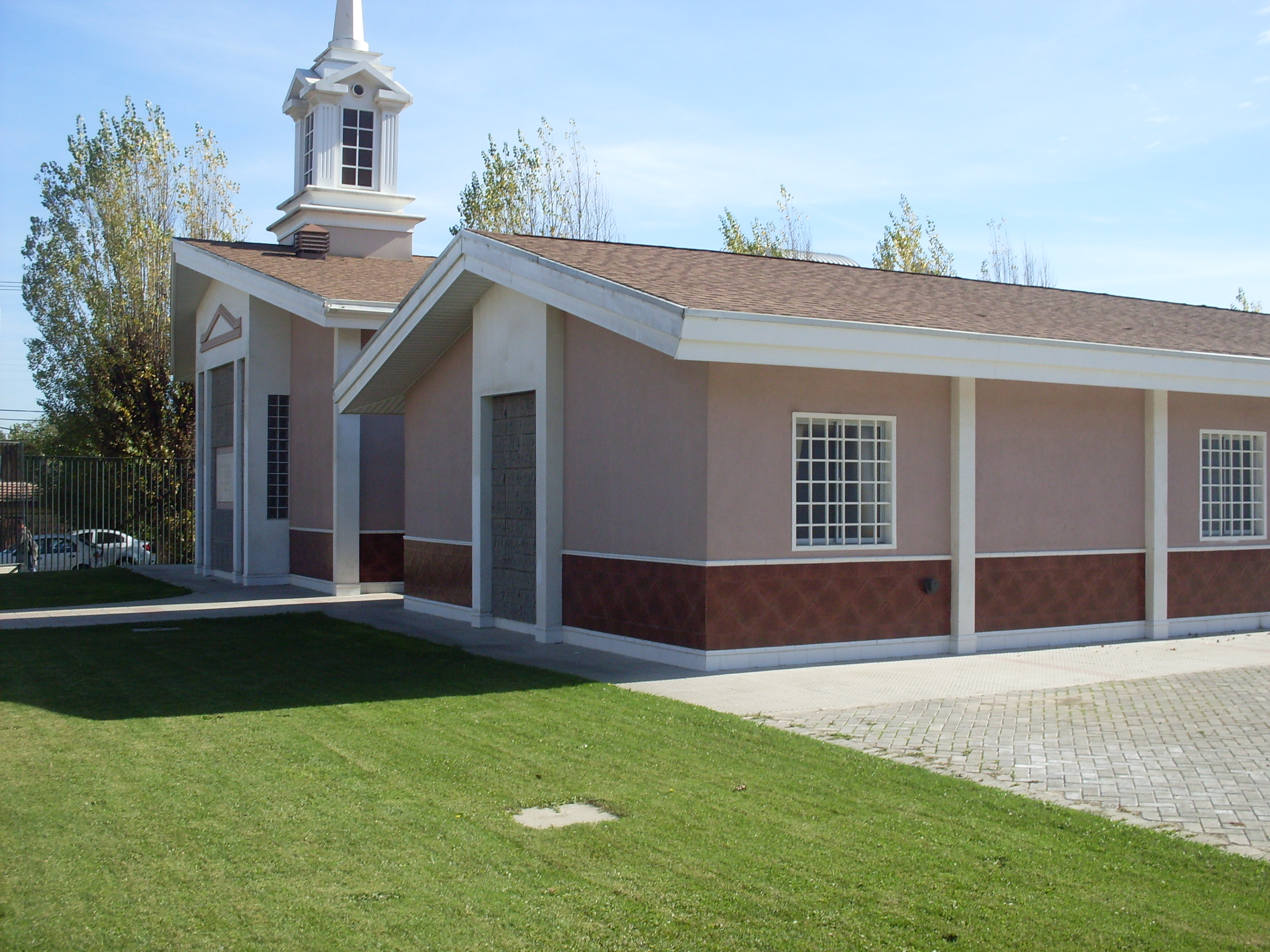
- A meetinghouse of the Church of Jesus Christ of Latter-day Saints in Esmeralda, Quilpué
- Area: South America South
- Members: 624,203 (2025)
- Stakes: 81
- Districts: 9
- Wards: 456
- Branches: 122
- Total Congregations: 578
- Missions: 11
- Temples: 3 operating; 1 under construction; 2 announced; 6 total
- FamilySearch Centers: 145

The Church of Jesus Christ of Latter-day Saints in Chile refers to the Church of Jesus Christ of Latter-day Saints (LDS Church) and its members in Chile. The first small branch was established in 1956. Since then, the LDS Church in Chile has grown to more than 600,000 members in 578 congregations. Chile ranks as having the 3rd most members of the LDS Church in South America and the 6th worldwide. The LDS Church in Chile has more members per capita than the United States and is the second largest denomination in Chile behind the Roman Catholic Church. Chile has more LDS Church members per capita than any country outside of the Pacific Islands.

== History ==
Membership in Chile
Year	Members
1960	614
1970	9,416
1980	63,658
1989	266,000
1999	502,153
2009	561,920
2019	602,373
2025	624,203
*Membership was published as a rounded number. Source: Windall J. Ashton; Jim M. Wall, Deseret News, various years, Church Almanac Country Information: Chile

The LDS Church has been established in Chile for over sixty years. The church experienced some periods of rapid expansion during that time, becoming, by some estimates, the second largest church in the country.

Early apostle Parley P. Pratt was among the first Mormon missionaries to preach in Chile, landing in Valparaiso in November, 1851, along with Elder Rufus Allen and Phoebe Sopher, one of Pratt's wives, who was pregnant at the time. The mission party was impressed by the Chilean countryside and people. Pratt wrote that the people he met in Chile were "a neat, plain, loving and sociable people; very friendly, frank, and easy to become acquainted with," but the mission trip met with tragedy when the Pratt's month-old son died in January 1852. Hampered by language difficulties and a lack of literature in the Spanish language (selections of the Book of Mormon were not translated into Spanish until 1875) the missionaries left Chile after four months without having a successful baptism. Pratt used his experience in South America to advise Brigham Young that the success of future missionary efforts would be based on translations of the Mormon scriptures. Another difficulty was that, at the time of Pratt's visit, the Chilean constitution did not permit the public practice of any religion besides Catholicism.

Missionary work in Chile began in earnest in 1956, when the country was made part of the Argentine mission and the first small branch was formed. By 1961, the country had 1,100 members and the Chilean mission was organized. The following three decades saw explosive growth in church membership, with the church membership doubling every two years at its peak. The growth sparked a building boom during these decades. Hundreds of LDS meetinghouses were constructed, capped by the dedication of the Santiago Temple in 1983. Church growth continued in the 1990s, with the country having the greatest growth in LDS membership in South America during the decade. Between 1994 and 1996, 26 new stakes were dedicated in the country.

The period of rapid expansion in membership was followed by a sharp contraction. The church is now retrenching after its period of high growth and hundreds of units have been decommissioned since 1998. In 2002, the church sent Elder Jeffrey R. Holland, a member of the Quorum of the Twelve Apostles, to remain in Chile for a year to train leadership and minister to the church, a role typically held by members of the quorums of the seventy. Due to high levels of member inactivity, 37% of the stakes created in Chile have since been discontinued.

Although an average of 12,000 people were baptized annually between 1961 and 1990, membership growth has now cooled and the church has a large number of inactive members. According to census data, 0.9% of the population claims to be Mormon, based upon those aged 15 and over who identify themselves as Mormon. The church itself reports that it has 595,526 members in Chile, which is equal to about 3.3% of the population. If accurate, these numbers makes the LDS Church the single largest denomination in Chile after Catholicism. LDS statistics counts everyone baptized, including children age eight or older as well as inactive members. Using unofficial sources, the Cumorah Project website estimates that 20% of Chilean members actively attend church services.

Jorge F. Zeballos, a former civil engineer, is a Chilean-born LDS general authority. He was called to the First Quorum of the Seventy in April, 2008. Zeballos is the second Chilean to serve as a general authority. He followed Eduardo Ayala, who served in the Second Quorum of the Seventy from 1990 to 1995.

A second temple, in Concepción, was announced in 2009. The groundbreaking for this temple occurred on October 17, 2015, and it was later dedicated on October 28, 2018.

In April 2019, church president Russell M. Nelson announced a third Chilean temple to be built in Antofagasta.

A fourth Temple was announced in 2021 to be built in Santiago, the second in the capital.

In the October 2023 General Conference, President Russel M. Nelson announced the plans to build a fifth Temple in the city of Viña del Mar.

== Church schools in Chile ==
When the Chilean Mission was organized in 1961, A. Delbert Palmer was its mission president. Church leaders considered communism to be an "evil force" and area authority Theodore Tuttle encouraged Palmer to create a school to protect students from communism. Local members requested schooling for their children, especially after some were expelled from Catholic schools for joining the LDS Church. In 1963, Tuttle and Palmer started preparing two elementary schools in La Cisterna and Vina del Mar. They reported directly to the first presidency rather than to the CES board of education. Dale Harding's position as superintendent was both a professional and religious position. The schools opened in March 1964.

In the 1960s in Chile, educational reforms gave children more opportunities for education, but there still existed a large divide between public and private schools, both of which were supported by the government. Because of the educational situation, parents were very interested in private LDS schools for their children. After the first year, all the children passed their government-administered end-of-year exams, with many performing very well. A large earthquake in March 1965 greatly damaged both schools, but the schools continued despite this setback. Rather than use the traditional lecture-exam format, teachers varied their teaching methods to include group work and in-service training. In 1967, Lyle J. Loosle became the new superintendent. Under his leadership, volunteers supported new elementary schools in Nunoa and Talcahuano.

In 1970, the Church Board of Education approved the purchase of a Catholic school near Santiago. Later that year, Salvador Allende, a Marxist, was elected as president, and Church members were uncertain about the future of the LDS Church and Church schools. Middle-class citizens of various kinds opposed a National Unified School system. The minister of education requested using a church building for another session of schooling. In response, Loosle increased enrollment to ensure that the schools were always operating at full capacity. Kindergartens operated in LDS chapels in Arica, Inquique, and La Calera to keep them from being used by the government for other purposes. After Allende was overthrown, the kindergartens closed.

Seminary teacher Richard Brimhall visited the schools in 1972 and felt alarmed at how many faculty were Marxists. That year, Jorge Rojas, from Mexico, became the next superintendent. He felt that the Church schools ought to be closed because of their Marxist leanings, and made this recommendation to Church officials. After Rojas dismissed two non-member teachers, other teachers formed a union to protest new policies. Loosle was asked to return after Church headquarters reassigned Rojas to a school in Mexico. Loosle dismissed teachers' union leaders when they refused to resign. The union leaders demanded reinstatement. Loosle asked teachers to repent of their unionization; some union members left the school, while others left the union. Loosle rehired some of the union leaders. In 1973, Beningno Pantoja Arratia became the new superintendent, and he instituted several reforms, including ecclesiastical interviews. In 1970, Neal A. Maxwell became the Church Commissioner of Education, a new position overseeing Church schools, seminaries, and institutes. A 1971 policy from Maxwell stated that non-religious education should only be provided by the Church when "other educational systems are nonexistent, seriously deficient or inaccessible to our members." Chilean church schools started to close in 1977, with the Church's growth and adequate public schools given as reasons for closure. By 1981, Church schools had completely closed in Chile, Peru, Bolivia, and Paraguay.

== Stakes and districts ==
Stake/District	Organized	Mission	Temple
Aconcagua Chile Stake	4 Jul 1993	Chile Santiago North	Santiago Chile
Alto Hospicio Chile Stake	11 May 2025	Chile Antofagasta	Antofagasta Chile
Angol Chile Stake	18 Dec 1994	Chile Concepción South	Concepción Chile
Antofagasta Chile East Stake	23 Nov 2025	Chile Antofagasta	Antofagasta Chile
Antofagasta Chile La Portada Stake	5 Sep 1993	Chile Antofagasta	Antofagasta Chile
Antofagasta Chile Stake	10 Aug 1980	Chile Antofagasta	Antofagasta Chile
Arauco Chile Stake	15 Oct 2023	Chile Concepción South	Concepción Chile
Arica Chile Costanera Stake	29 Jan 1980	Chile Antofagasta	Antofagasta Chile
Arica Chile Los Olivos Stake	12 Mar 1995	Chile Antofagasta	Antofagasta Chile
Buín Chile Stake	8 Oct 2023	Chile Santiago South	Santiago Chile
Calama Chile Stake	17 Mar 1985	Chile Antofagasta	Antofagasta Chile
Chillán Chile Ñuble Stake	24 Nov 1996	Chile Concepción	Concepción Chile
Chillán Chile Stake	13 Feb 1983	Chile Concepción	Concepción Chile
Chiloe Chile District	13 Dec 1983	Chile Puerto Montt	Concepción Chile
Colina Chile Stake	12 Nov 2023	Chile Santiago North	Santiago Chile
Concepción Chile Andalién Stake	28 Oct 1979	Chile Concepción	Concepción Chile
Concepción Chile Chiguayante Stake	18 Dec 1994	Chile Concepción	Concepción Chile
Concepción Chile Stake	30 Jan 1977	Chile Concepción	Concepción Chile
Copiapó Chile Stake	11 Apr 1993	Chile La Serena	Antofagasta Chile
Coquimbo Chile Stake	31 Aug 2014	Chile La Serena	Santiago Chile
Coyhaique Chile District	17 Aug 2003	Chile Puerto Montt	Concepción Chile
Curicó Chile Stake	10 May 1981	Chile Rancagua	Santiago Chile
El Belloto Chile Stake	11 Apr 1993	Chile Viña del Mar	Santiago Chile
Hualpén Chile Stake	15 Jun 1980	Chile Concepción	Concepción Chile
Illapel Chile District	23 Nov 1986	Chile La Serena	Santiago Chile
Iquique Chile Stake	14 Dec 1986	Chile Antofagasta	Antofagasta Chile
La Serena Chile Stake	23 Oct 1988	Chile La Serena	Santiago Chile
Linares Chile Stake	28 Oct 2023	Chile Concepción	Concepción Chile
Los Ángeles Chile North Stake	1 Jun 1986	Chile Concepción South	Concepción Chile
Los Ángeles Chile South Stake	1 Dec 1996	Chile Concepción South	Concepción Chile
Osorno Chile Rahue Stake	25 May 1997	Chile Puerto Montt	Concepción Chile
Osorno Chile Stake	17 May 1981	Chile Puerto Montt	Concepción Chile
Ovalle Chile District	24 Nov 2002	Chile La Serena	Santiago Chile
Peñaflor Chile Stake	10 Dec 1981	Chile Santiago West	Santiago Chile
Penco Chile Stake	24 May 1981	Chile Concepción	Concepción Chile
Puerto Montt Chile Stake	25 Apr 1982	Chile Puerto Montt	Concepción Chile
Puerto Varas Chile Stake	24 Mar 2024	Chile Puerto Montt	Concepción Chile
Punta Arenas Chile Stake	10 Jun 1984	Chile Puerto Montt	Concepción Chile
Quillota Chile Stake	7 Jun 1981	Chile Viña del Mar	Santiago Chile
Quilpué Chile Stake	28 Nov 1976	Chile Viña del Mar	Santiago Chile
Rancagua Chile Stake	26 Aug 1981	Chile Rancagua	Santiago Chile
Rancagua Chile Tupahue Stake	11 Apr 1993	Chile Rancagua	Santiago Chile
San Antonio Chile Stake	2 Jul 1989	Chile Santiago West	Santiago Chile
San Fernando Chile District	30 Jun 2002	Chile Rancagua	Santiago Chile
San Pedro Chile Stake	30 Aug 1981	Chile Concepción South	Concepción Chile
Santa Cruz Chile District	8 Oct 1981	Chile Rancagua	Santiago Chile
Santiago Chile Alicahue Stake	20 Aug 1995	Chile Santiago East	Santiago Chile
Santiago Chile Cinco de Abril Stake	10 Jun 1979	Chile Santiago West	Santiago Chile
Santiago Chile Conchalí Stake	4 Nov 1979	Chile Santiago North	Santiago Chile
Santiago Chile Cordillera Stake	19 Mar 1995	Chile Santiago East	Santiago Chile
Santiago Chile Gabriela Stake	8 Dec 1996	Chile Santiago East	Santiago Chile
Santiago Chile Huelén Stake	19 Nov 1972	Chile Santiago North	Santiago Chile
Santiago Chile Independencia Stake	6 May 1979	Chile Santiago North	Santiago Chile
Santiago Chile Javiera Carrera Stake	20 Sep 1992	Chile Santiago East	Santiago Chile
Santiago Chile La Cisterna Stake	8 Dec 1974	Chile Santiago South	Santiago Chile
Santiago Chile La Florida Stake	10 Jun 1979	Chile Santiago East	Santiago Chile
Santiago Chile La Reina Stake	27 Jun 1993	Chile Santiago East	Santiago Chile
Santiago Chile Las Condes Stake	12 Mar 1983	Chile Santiago East	Santiago Chile
Santiago Chile Los Alerces Stake	9 Jul 1995	Chile Santiago South	Santiago Chile
Santiago Chile Los Aviadores Stake	14 Dec 1980	Chile Santiago South	Santiago Chile
Santiago Chile Los Cerrillos Stake	30 Jul 1995	Chile Santiago West	Santiago Chile
Santiago Chile Maipú Stake	6 Dec 1992	Chile Santiago West	Santiago Chile
Santiago Chile Ñuñoa Stake	28 Nov 1976	Chile Santiago East	Santiago Chile
Santiago Chile Ochagavía Stake	19 Nov 1995	Chile Santiago West	Santiago Chile
Santiago Chile Olimpo Stake	22 Nov 1998	Chile Santiago West	Santiago Chile
Santiago Chile Puente Alto Stake	18 Aug 1985	Chile Santiago East	Santiago Chile
Santiago Chile Quilicura Stake	9 Nov 1980	Chile Santiago North	Santiago Chile
Santiago Chile Renca Stake	16 Sep 1984	Chile Santiago North	Santiago Chile
Santiago Chile República Stake	18 Apr 1976	Chile Santiago West	Santiago Chile
Santiago Chile San Bernardo Stake	25 Feb 1979	Chile Santiago South	Santiago Chile
Santiago Chile San Miguel Stake	18 Aug 1985	Chile Santiago South	Santiago Chile
Santiago Chile San Pablo Stake	13 Mar 1983	Chile Santiago North	Santiago Chile
Santiago Chile Vicuña Mackenna Stake	21 Mar 1993	Chile Santiago East	Santiago Chile
Santiago Chile Zapadores Stake	14 Nov 1982	Chile Santiago North	Santiago Chile
Talagante Chile Stake	10 May 2015	Chile Santiago West	Santiago Chile
Talca Chile Stake	18 Nov 1979	Chile Rancagua	Concepción Chile
Talcahuano Chile North Stake	16 Oct 1977	Chile Concepción	Concepción Chile
Temuco Chile Cautín Stake	26 Nov 1995	Chile Concepción South	Concepción Chile
Temuco Chile Ñielol Stake	18 Mar 1981	Chile Concepción South	Concepción Chile
Valdivia Chile Calle Calle Stake	23 Nov 1997	Chile Puerto Montt	Concepción Chile
Valdivia Chile Stake	10 Jan 1988	Chile Puerto Montt	Concepción Chile
Vallenar Chile District	29 Oct 1981	Chile La Serena	Santiago Chile
Valparaíso Chile Stake	20 Nov 1977	Chile Viña del Mar	Santiago Chile
Valparaíso Chile West Stake	5 Jul 2015	Chile Viña del Mar	Santiago Chile
Victoria Chile District	26 May 1983	Chile Concepción South	Concepción Chile
Villa Alemana Chile Stake	8 Jun 1979	Chile Viña del Mar	Santiago Chile
Villa Alemana Chile West Stake	14 Jul 1996	Chile Viña del Mar	Santiago Chile
Villarrica Chile District	26 May 1983	Chile Concepción South	Concepción Chile
Viña del Mar Chile Achupallas Stake	28 Oct 1984	Chile Viña del Mar	Santiago Chile
Viña del Mar Chile Stake	5 Dec 1974	Chile Viña del Mar	Santiago Chile

== Missions ==
Mission	Organized
Chile Antofagasta	1 Jul 1988
Chile Concepción	1 Jul 1975
Chile Concepción South	1 Jul 2003
Chile La Serena	June 2024
Chile Puerto Montt	1 Jul 1977
Chile Rancagua	8 Oct 1961
Chile Santiago East	1 Jul 1997
Chile Santiago North	1 Jan 1977
Chile Santiago South	1 Jul 2013
Chile Santiago West	1 Jul 1995
Chile Viña del Mar	1 Jul 1979

=== Falkland Islands ===
As of 2025, the Falkland Islands Branch is administered by the Chile Puerto Montt Mission. The LDS Church has not released membership information for the territory since it reported that it had 10 members in 2015. It reports the branch to be English Speaking on its meetinghouse locator website but without a meeting location.

== Temples ==
Temples in Chile
- = Operating
- = Under construction
- = Announced
- = Temporarily Closed

24. Santiago Chile Temple; Official website; News & images	
Location: Announced: Groundbreaking: Dedicated: Rededicated: Size:	Santiago, Chile; 2 April 1980 by Spencer W. Kimball; 30 May 1981 by Spencer W. Kimball; 15 September 1983 by Gordon B. Hinckley; 12 March 2006 by Gordon B. Hinckley; 20,831 sq ft (1,935.3 m^{2}) on a 2.61-acre (1.06 ha) site - designed by Emil B. Fetzer
160. Concepción Chile Temple; Official website; News & images	
Location: Announced: Groundbreaking: Dedicated: Size:	Concepción, Chile; 3 October 2009 by Thomas S. Monson; 17 October 2015 by Walter F. González; 28 October 2018 by Russell M. Nelson; 23,095 sq ft (2,145.6 m^{2}) on a 4.06-acre (1.64 ha) site
207. Antofagasta Chile Temple; Official website; News & images	
Location: Announced: Groundbreaking: Dedicated: Size:	Antofagasta, Chile; 7 April 2019 by Russell M. Nelson; 27 November 2020 by Juan Pablo Villar; 15 June 2025 by Gary E. Stevenson; 26,163 sq ft (2,430.6 m^{2}) on a 2-acre (0.81 ha) site
249. Santiago West Chile Temple (Under construction); Official website; News & images	
Location: Announced: Groundbreaking: Size:	Santiago, Chile; 3 October 2021 by Russell M. Nelson; 17 August 2024 by Alan R. Walker; 12,500 sq ft (1,160 m^{2}) on a 2.4-acre (0.97 ha) site
328. Viña del Mar Chile Temple (Site announced); Official website; News & images	
Location: Announced: Size:	Viña del Mar, Valparaíso, Chile; 1 October 2023 by Russell M. Nelson; 30,000 sq ft (2,800 m^{2}) on a 1.87-acre (0.76 ha) site
357. Puerto Montt Chile Temple (Site announced); Official website; News & images	
Location: Announced: Size:	Puerto Montt, Chile; 6 October 2024 by Russell M. Nelson; 18,500 sq ft (1,720 m^{2}) on a 5.8-acre (2.3 ha) site

== See also ==
- Religion in Chile
