= Religion in Chile =

Religion in Chile (2024 census)
1. Catholicism (54.0%)
2. Protestantism (16.3%)
3. Other Christian (2.80%)
4. No religion (25.8%)
5. Other religions (0.90%)

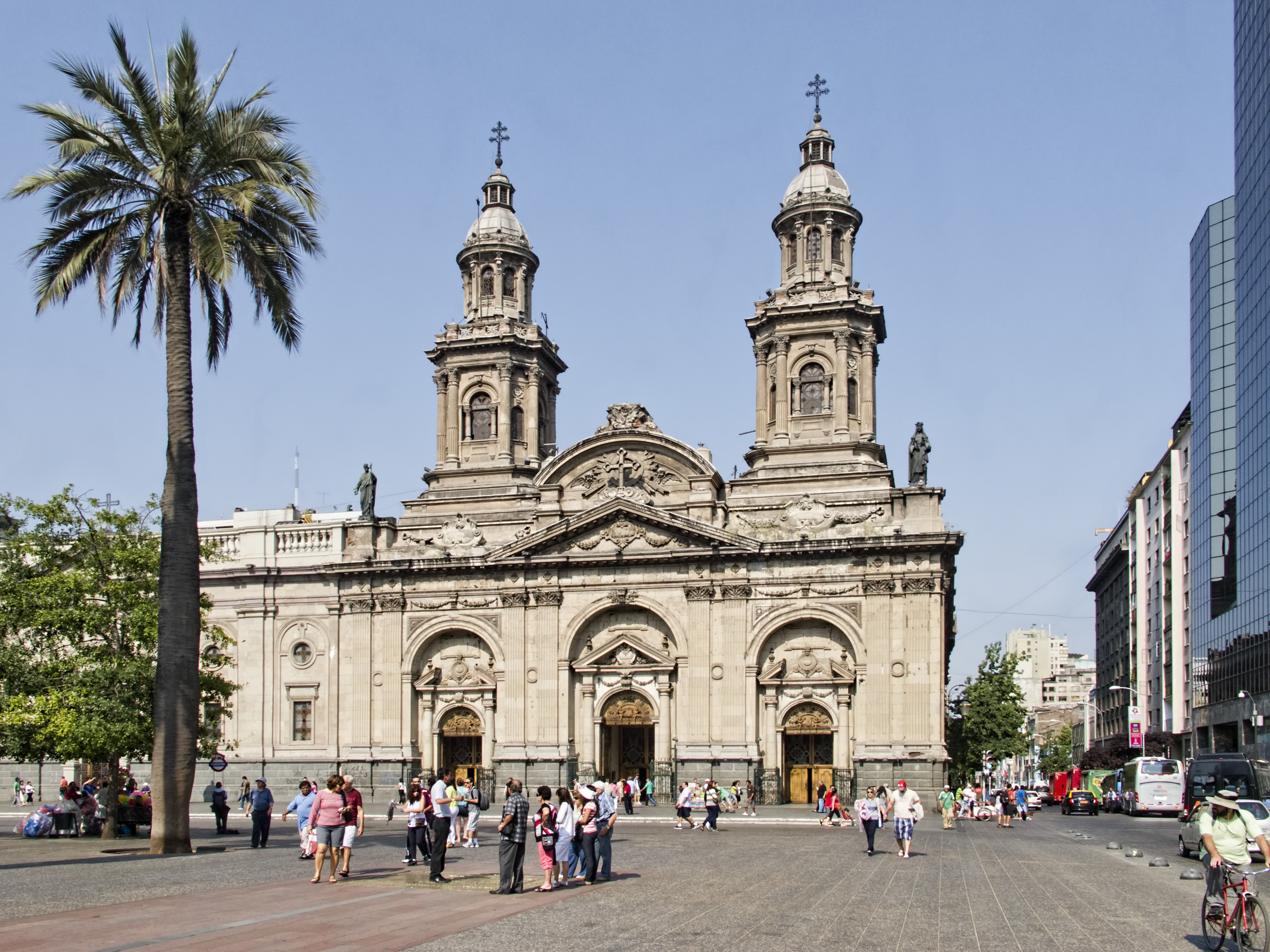
Santiago Metropolitan Cathedral.

Christianity is the most widely professed religion in Chile, with Catholicism being its largest denomination. The country is secular and the freedom of religion is established under its Constitution.

Historically, the indigenous peoples in Chile observed a variety of religions before the Spanish conquest in the 16th century. During Spanish rule and the first century of Chilean independence, the Catholic Church was one of the most powerful institutions in the country. In the late 19th century, liberal policies (the so-called Leyes laicas or "lay laws") started to reduce the influence of the clergy and the promulgation of a new Constitution in 1925 established the separation of church and state.

A 2023 AmericasBarometer survey revealed that almost 40% of the Chilean population is unaffiliated, making Chile the second least religious country in Latin America, after Uruguay.

== Demography ==
In the last census in Chile, in the year 2002, indigenous people make up 5 percent (780,000) of the population. 65 percent of indigenous people identify themselves as Catholic, 29 percent as evangelical, and 6 percent as "others."

In 2022, Chilean affiliations were 88% Christian (mainly Catholic), 0.15% Baha'i, 0.1% Jewish, 0.1% Muslim and 10% non-religious.

The 2024 census revealed that 53.7% of Chilean people aged 15 years or older were Catholics, 25.7% had no religion, 16.2% were Protestants, and 3.8% professed another religion.

Members of the largest religious groups (Catholic, Pentecostal, and other evangelical churches) are numerous in the capital and are also found in other regions of the country. Jewish communities are located in Santiago, Valparaíso, Viña del Mar, Valdivia, Temuco, Concepción, La Serena, and Iquique (although there is no synagogue in Iquique). Mosques are located in Santiago, Iquique, and Coquimbo.

Mapuche communities, constituting 87% of indigenous citizens, continue to respect traditional religious leaders (Longkos and Machis), and anecdotal information indicates a high degree of syncretism in worship and traditional healing practices.

== Religious affiliation and practices ==
=== Evolution ===
UC-Adimark Bicentennial Survey
Year	Catholic	Protestant/Evangelical	Unaffiliated	Other religions
2006	70%	14%	12%	4%
2007	66%	18%	14%	3%
2008	67%	14%	15%	4%
2009	67%	16%	13%	4%
2010	63%	17%	17%	3%
2011	63%	15%	18%	4%
2012	59%	18%	19%	4%
2013	61%	17%	19%	4%
2014	59%	16%	22%	3%
2015	61%	16%	21%	2%
2016	58%	18%	20%	3%
2017	59%	17%	19%	4%
2018	58%	16%	21%	3%
2019	45%	18%	32%	5%
2021	42%	14%	37%	6%

=== Importance of religion ===
According to a 2015 Pew Research Center report, Chileans who say religion is very important in their lives has decreased from 46% in 2007 to 27% in 2015. Twenty percent said religion is "Not at all important."

How important is religion in your life?
Year	Very important	Somewhat important	Not too important	Not at all important	Don't Know/Refused
2007	46%	31%	11%	10%	3%
2013	39%	32%	18%	10%	0%
2015	27%	34%	17%	20%	2%
2021	23%	25%	32%	19%	1%

== Legal and policy framework ==
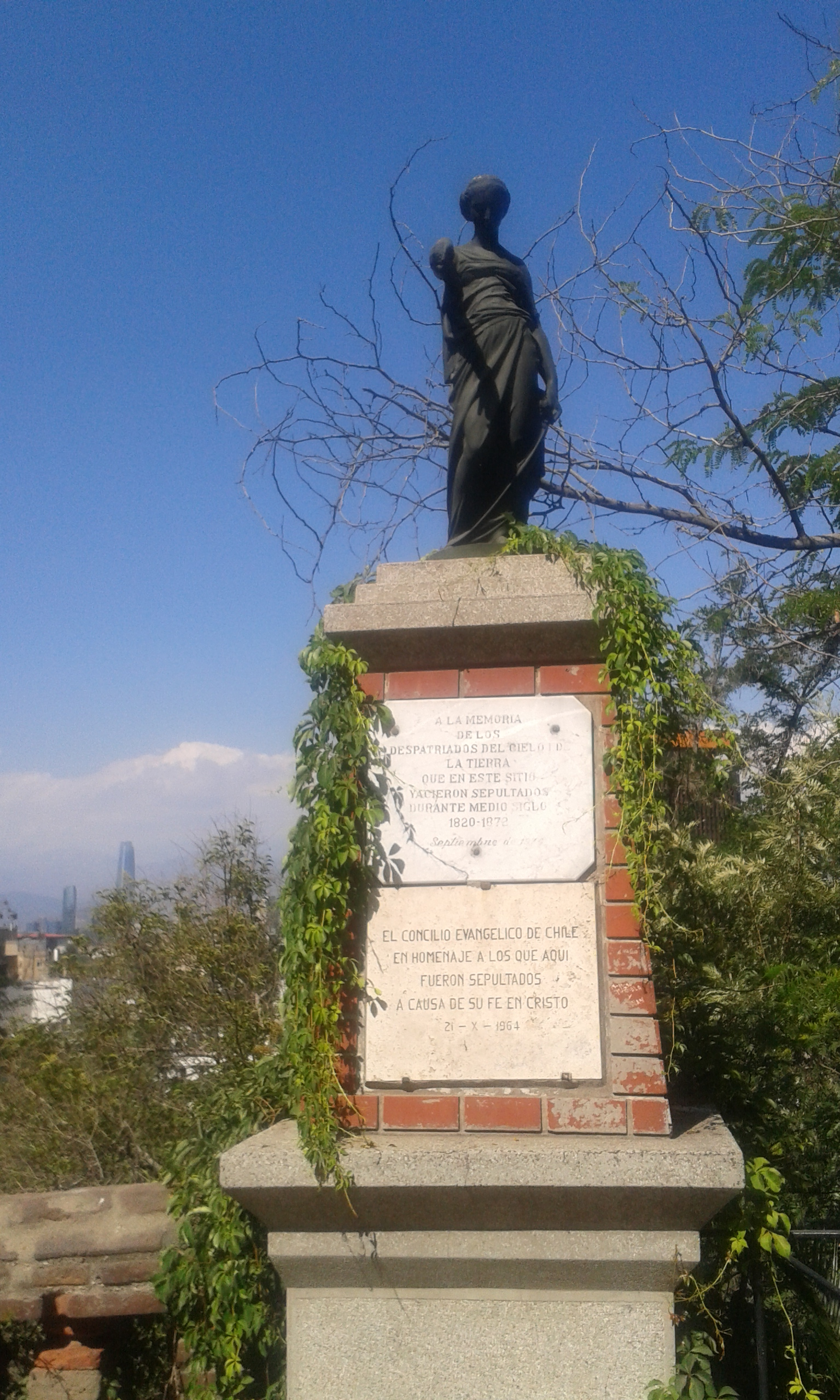
A modest memorial for the Protestants buried at the hillside of the Cerro Santa Lucía in Santiago de Chile. Until 1871, the Catholic Church forbade the burial of "dissidents" in cemeteries.

The Constitution provides for freedom of religion. On June 28 2022, the Constitutional Convention approved a draft constitution that included four paragraphs establishing freedom of religion as a fundamental right.

Church and state are officially separate. The 1999 law on religion prohibits religious discrimination; however, the Catholic Church enjoys a privileged status and occasionally receives preferential treatment. In 2006, government officials were attending Catholic events as well as major Protestant and Jewish ceremonies.

The Government observes Christmas, Good Friday, the Feast of the Virgin of Carmen, the Feast of Saints Peter and Paul, the Feast of the Assumption, All Saints' Day, and the Feast of the Immaculate Conception as national holidays.

The law allows any religious group to apply for legal public right status (comprehensive religious nonprofit status). The Ministry of Justice may not refuse to accept a registration petition, although it may object to the petition within 90 days on the grounds that all legal prerequisites for registration have not been satisfied. The petitioner then has 60 days to address objections raised by the Ministry or challenge the Ministry in court. Once a religious entity is registered, the state cannot dissolve it by decree. The semiautonomous Council for the Defense of the State may initiate a judicial review; however, no organization that has registered under the 1999 law has subsequently been deregistered.

In addition, the law allows religious entities to adopt a charter and by-laws suited to a religious organization rather than a private corporation. They may establish affiliates (schools, clubs, and sports organizations) without registering them as separate corporations.

During 2006, 516 religious organizations registered under the 1999 law and gained legal public right status, bringing the total to 1,659 registered religious groups. Publicly subsidized schools are required to offer religious education twice a week through high school; participation is optional (with parental waiver). Religious instruction in public schools is almost exclusively Catholic. Teaching the creed requested by parents is mandatory; however, enforcement is sometimes lax, and religious education in faiths other than Catholicism is often provided privately through Sunday schools and at other venues. Local school administrations decide how funds are spent on religious instruction. Although the Ministry of Education has approved curriculums for 14 other denominations, 92 percent of public schools and 81 percent of private schools offered only Catholic instruction. Parents may homeschool their children or enroll them in private schools for religious reasons.

== Religious freedom ==
The constitution Chile provides for the freedom of religion, although it stipulates that this freedom must be not be “opposed to morals, to good customs or to the public order". It further establishes a separation between church and state, and other laws prohibit religious discrimination.

Religious organizations are not required to register with the government, but may do so to receive tax breaks. Religious groups may appoint chaplains to provide services in hospitals and prisons. Officially registered groups may appoint chaplains for the military. The celebration of a Catholic Mass frequently marks official and public events. In 2006, membership in the Catholic Church is considered beneficial to a military career.

All schools are required to provide two hours of religious education per week, tailored to the religious affiliations of the students. The majority of such courses focus on a Catholic perspective, but the government has approved curricula for 14 different religious groups. Parents may also choose to excuse their children from such classes.

According to Christian Solidarity Worldwide, arsonists attacked Baptist and Catholic churches in the primarily indigenous Mapuche communities in the rural Araucania Region in 2017. According to other sources, the church attacks fit into a pattern of sabotage directed at a wide range of institutions, business interests, and infrastructure in Araucania, and thus may not necessarily have been intended as a religiously-motivated attack. As of the end of 2017, a trial was still pending for the arson suspects, and the regional government verbally committed itself to helping rebuild the churches.

Leaders of the Jewish community have expressed concerns about incidences of antisemitic vandalism and graffiti targeting Jews.

Catholic Church Approval (2017)
1. Approve (32.0%)
2. Disapprove (56.0%)
3. Don't Know/No Answer (12.0%)

The National Office of Religious Affairs facilitates inter-religious dialogue and promotes tolerance of religious diversity.

In 2023, Chile was scored 4 out of 4 for religious freedom.

== Christianity ==
Christianity in Chile is the most prevalent religion in the country. According to the 2024 census data, all forms of Christianity combined amount to a total of 11,061,994 people, representing 72.7% of the population.

=== Catholicism ===
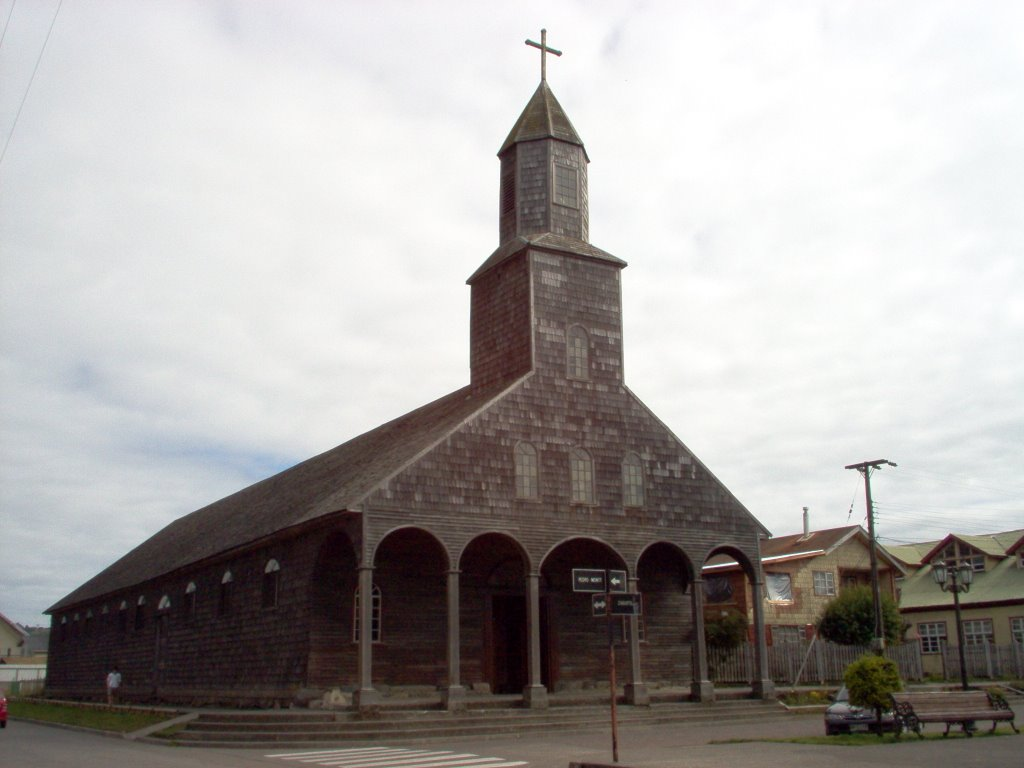
The Catholic Churches of Chiloé have been declared part of the UNESCO World Heritage.

As with most of Latin America, Catholicism is the main religion in Chile since its introduction during the Spanish colonization of the Americas although their figures have declined significantly in the last decade. In 2022, the Vatican noted that 74% of the population was Catholic.

Catholicism was introduced by priests with the Spanish colonialists in the 16th century. Most of the native population in the northern and central regions was evangelized by 1650. The southern area proved more difficult and Catholicism settled in the area after the Occupation of the Araucania in the late 19th century. In the 20th century, church expansion was impeded by a shortage of clergy and government attempts to control church administration. Relations between church and state were strained under both Salvador Allende and Augusto Pinochet.

The Catholic Church is one of the largest organizations in the country. There are five archdioceses, 18 dioceses, two territorial prelatures, one apostolic vicariate, one military ordinariate and one personal prelature (Opus Dei). Usually, the archbishop of Santiago acts as the head of the church in the country, although the Holy See is represented officially by the Apostolic Nunciature to Chile.

The Catholic Church is currently one of the principal providers of education (including universities) and health care in the country and is involved in several initiatives to support different charities. Its record in higher education is exceptional. The QS World Universities Rankings ranked Pontifical Catholic University of Chile the best university in the country and second best in all of Latin America. However, the support of the Chilean population has decreased in the last decades, especially after diverse cases of sexual abuse by Catholic members have been published. According to a survey conducted in October 2017 by Plaza Publica Cadem, 56% of Chileans disapprove the performance of the Catholic Church in Chile, whilst 32% approve.

In 2024, Chile had 8,168,978 Catholics, according to the census, representing 53.7% of the population.

=== Protestantism ===
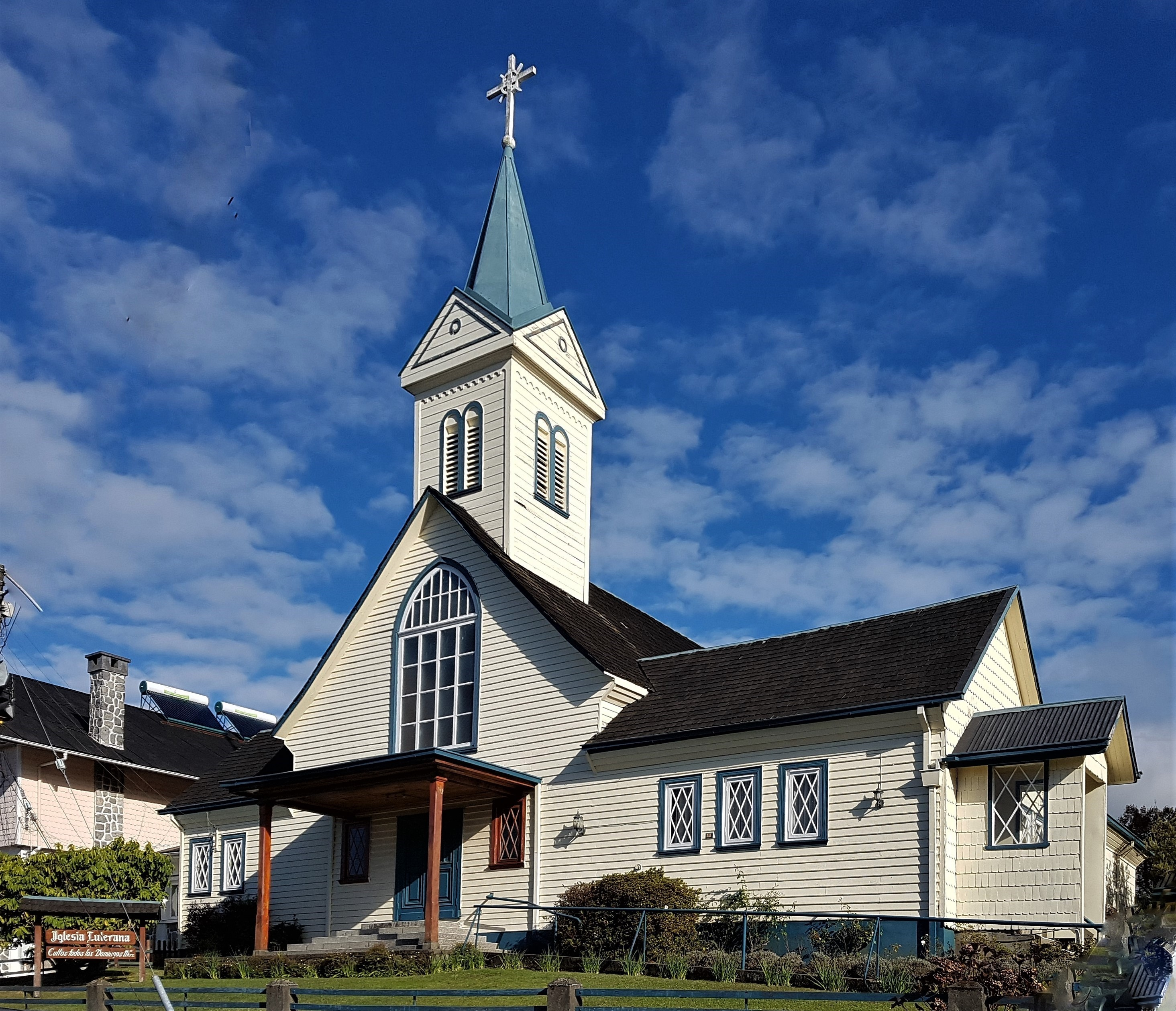
The Frutillar Lutheran Temple is a National Monument of Chile

The 2024 census registered 2,466,607 Protestants, representing 16.2% of Chilean people. Protestants first arrived in the first half of the nineteenth century, with American missionary David Trumbull and with German immigrants from Protestant parts of Germany, mainly Lutherans. Later, representatives from Anglicanism, Presbyterianism, Baptists, Seventh-day Adventist Church, Methodism, Pentecostalism, and other Protestant denominations began work in the country.

Seventh-Day Adventist missionaries first arrived in 1895. Today, there are estimated 126,814 Adventists in Chile.

=== Latter-day Saints (Mormonism) ===
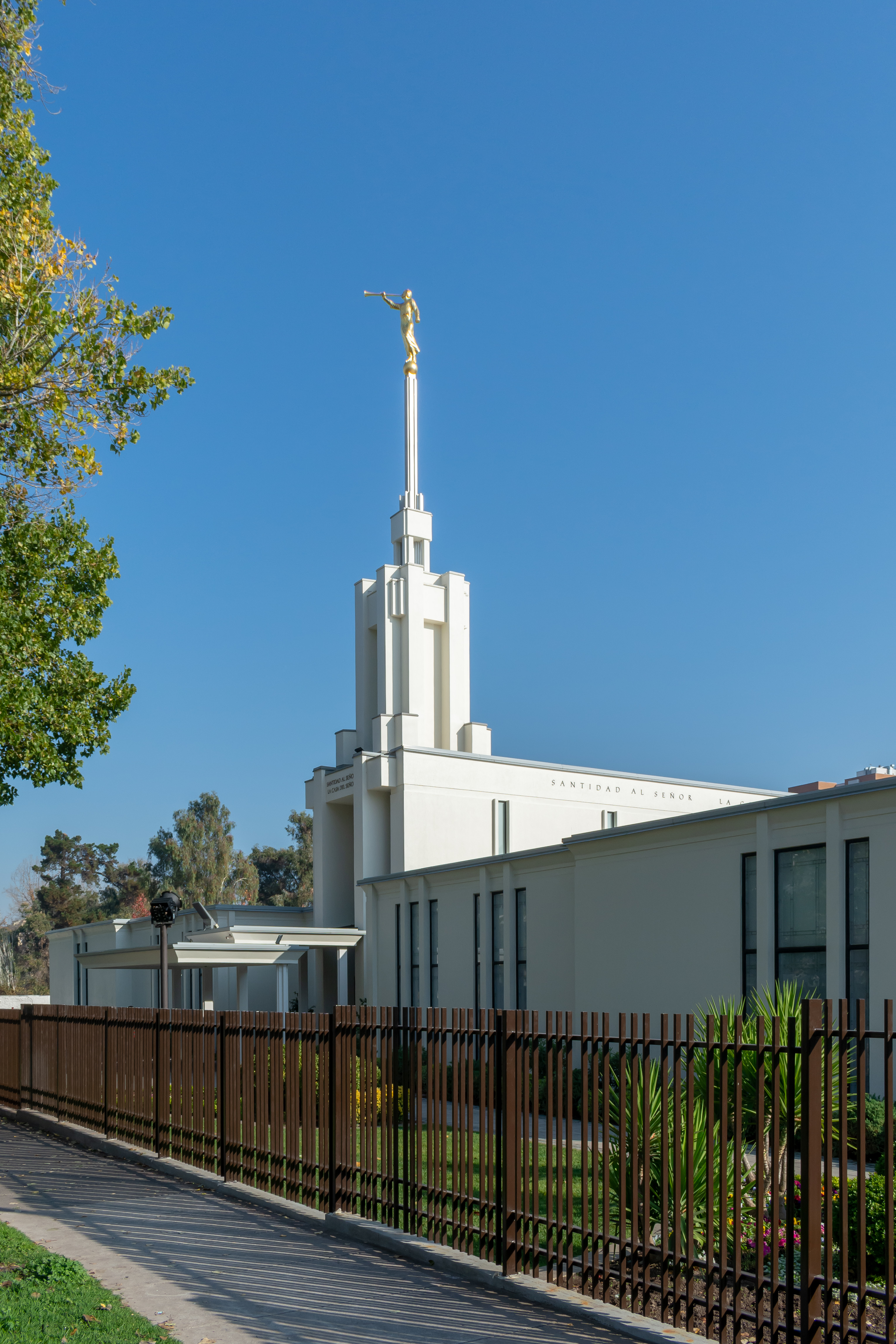
Santiago Chile Temple

Early apostle Parley P. Pratt was among the first Mormon missionaries to preach in Chile, landing in Valparaiso in November, 1851, along with Elder Rufus Allen and Phoebe Sopher, one of Pratt's wives, who was pregnant at the time. The mission party was impressed by the Chilean countryside and people. Pratt wrote that the people he met in Chile were “a neat, plain, loving and sociable people; very friendly, frank, and easy to become acquainted with,” but the mission trip met with tragedy when the Pratt's month-old son died in January 1852. Hampered by language difficulties and a lack of literature in the Spanish language (selections of the Book of Mormon were not translated into Spanish until 1875) the missionaries left Chile after four months without having a successful baptism. Pratt used his experience in South America to advise Brigham Young that the success of future missionary efforts would be based on translations of the scriptures.

Missionary work in Chile began in earnest in 1956, when the country was made part of the Argentine mission and the first small branch was formed. By 1961, the country had 1,100 members and the Chilean mission was organized. The following three decades saw explosive growth in church membership, with the church membership doubling every two years at its peak. The growth sparked a building boom during these decades. Hundreds of LDS chapels were constructed, capped by the dedication of the Santiago Temple in 1983. Church growth continued in the 1990s, with the country having the greatest growth in LDS membership in South America during the decade. Between 1994 and 1996, 26 new stakes were dedicated in the country. A second temple, in Concepción, was announced in 2009. The Antofagasta Chile Temple, Chile's third temple, was announced on April 7, 2019, by President Russell M. Nelson in his concluding remarks at the Sunday Afternoon Session of General Conference.

Although an average of 12,000 people were baptized annually between 1961 and 1990, membership growth has slowed and the church has a large number of inactive members. According to census data, 0.9% of the population claims to be Mormon, based upon those aged 15 and over who identify themselves as Mormon. The church itself reports that it has 543,628 members in Chile, which is equal to about 3.2% of the population. If accurate, these numbers makes the LDS Church the single largest denomination in Chile after Catholicism. LDS statistics counts everyone baptized, including children age eight or older as well as inactive members. In 2002, the church sent Elder Jeffrey R. Holland, a member of the Quorum of the Twelve Apostles, to remain in Chile for a year to train leadership and minister to the church, a role typically held by members of the quorums of the seventy. The 2024 Chilean census listed 94,266 adherents (0.6% of the population) living in Chile.

Jorge F. Zeballos, a former mining engineer, is a Chilean-born LDS General Authority. He was called to the First Quorum of the Seventy in April, 2008. Zeballos is the second Chilean to serve as a General Authority following Eduardo Ayala, who served in the Second Quorum of the Seventy from 1990 to 1995.

=== Jehovah's Witnesses ===
In 2024, the number of Jehovah's Witnesses was 88,592 active publishers, united in 974 congregations; 188,741 people attended annual celebration of Lord's Evening Meal in 2024. In 2024, the Chilean census registered 121,805 Jehovah's Witnesses (0.8% of the population) living in Chile.

== Judaism ==
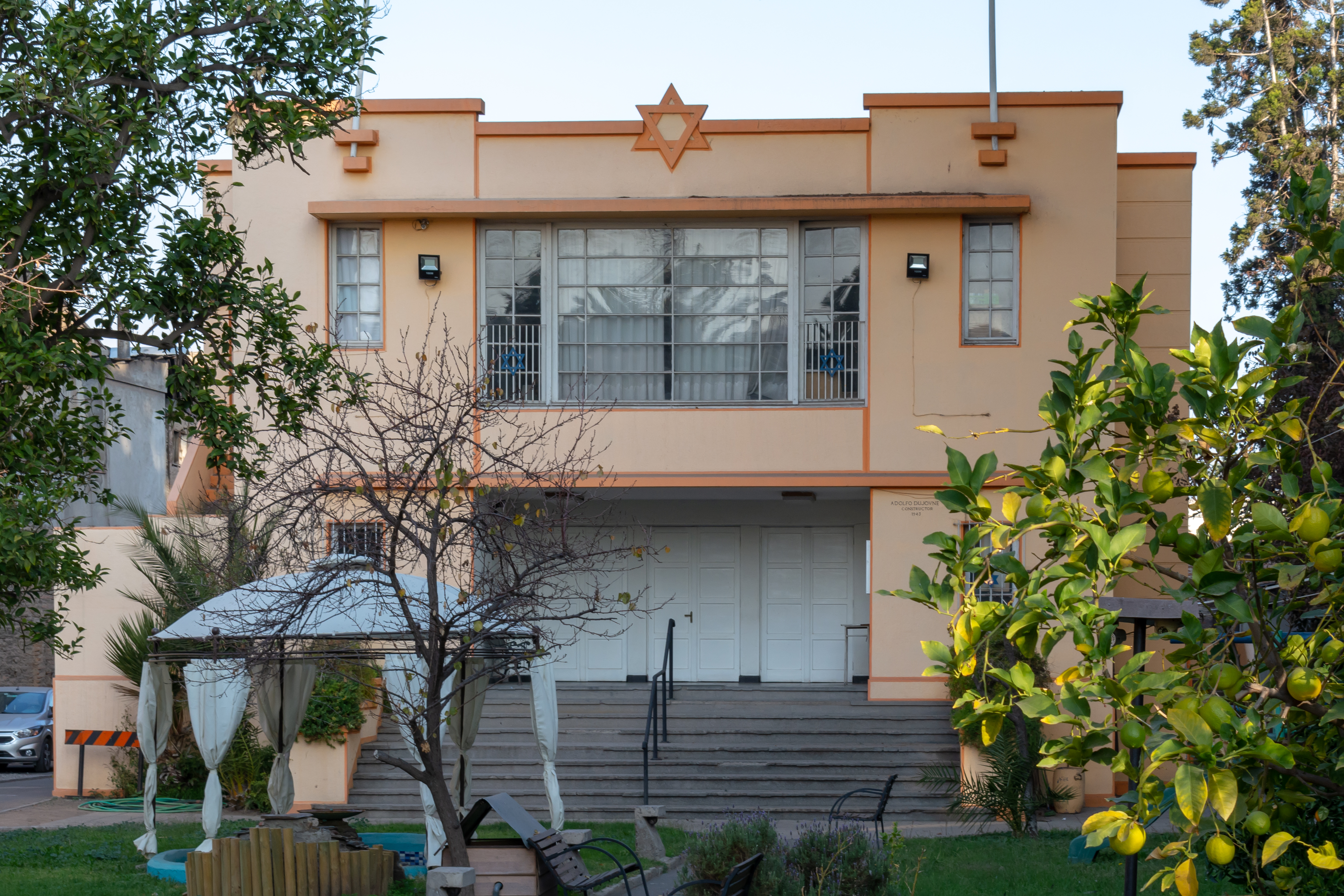
Bicur Joilim Synagogue in Santiago

The earliest recorded Jew living in Chile was a converso by the name of Rodrigo de Orgonos who came with the expedition of Diego de Almagro in 1535. Conversos were widely persecuted until Chile gained independence from Spain in 1818. Even after independence, it was not until 1865 that a special law permitted non-Catholics to practice their religion in private homes and establish private schools. As of the 2024 Chilean census, 28,153 Chilean residents listed their religion as Judaism.

== Islam ==
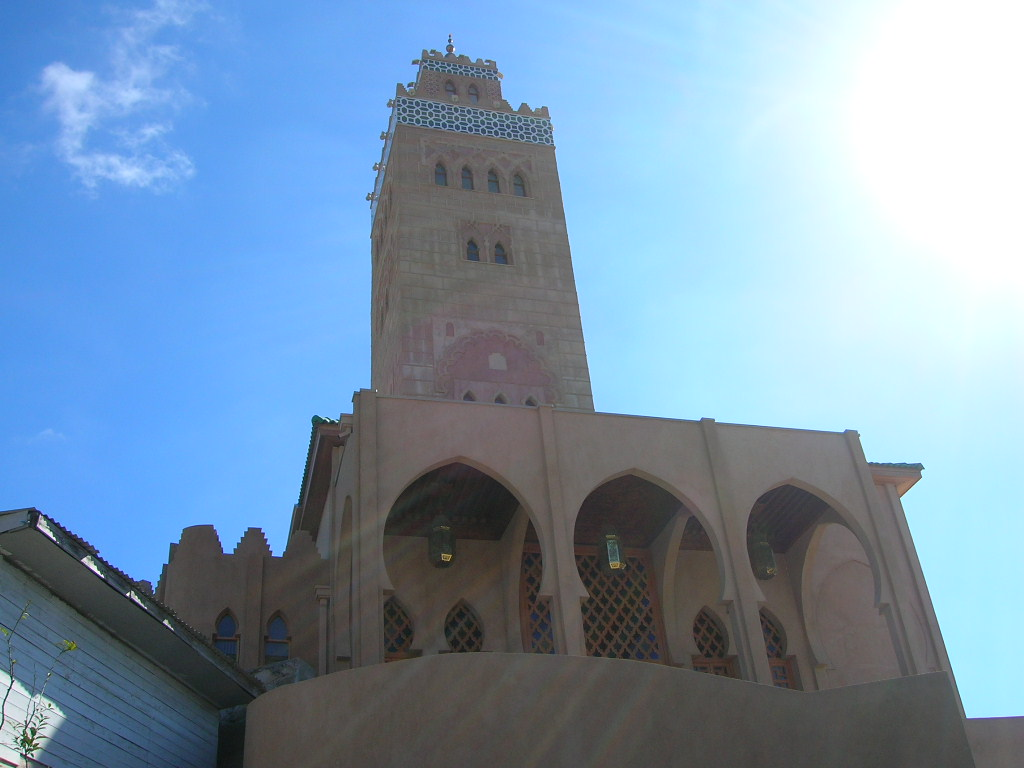
Mosque in Coquimbo.

As of 2024, the Muslim population in Chile was 10,197 people, representing 0.07% of the population.

Islam has enjoyed a long history in Chile. Aurelio Díaz Meza's Chronicles of the History of Chile, one man in discoverer Diego de Almagro's expedition, a certain Pedro de Gasco, was a morisco (that is, a Moor from al-Andalus, Spain, who had been obliged to convert from Islam to Roman Catholicism). The first Islamic institution in Chile, the Muslim Union Society (Sociedad Unión Musulmana), was founded on September 25, 1926, at Santiago. The Society of Mutual Aid and Islamic Charity was established the following year, on October 16, 1927. In Chile, Islam is primarily the result of Lebanese, Syrian and Palestinian migrations from the 19th and early 20th centuries. Fleeing conditions in the Ottoman Empire, these Levantine immigrants and their descendants permanently settled in Chile and established the first Islamic institutions in the 1920s.

== Baháʼí Faith ==
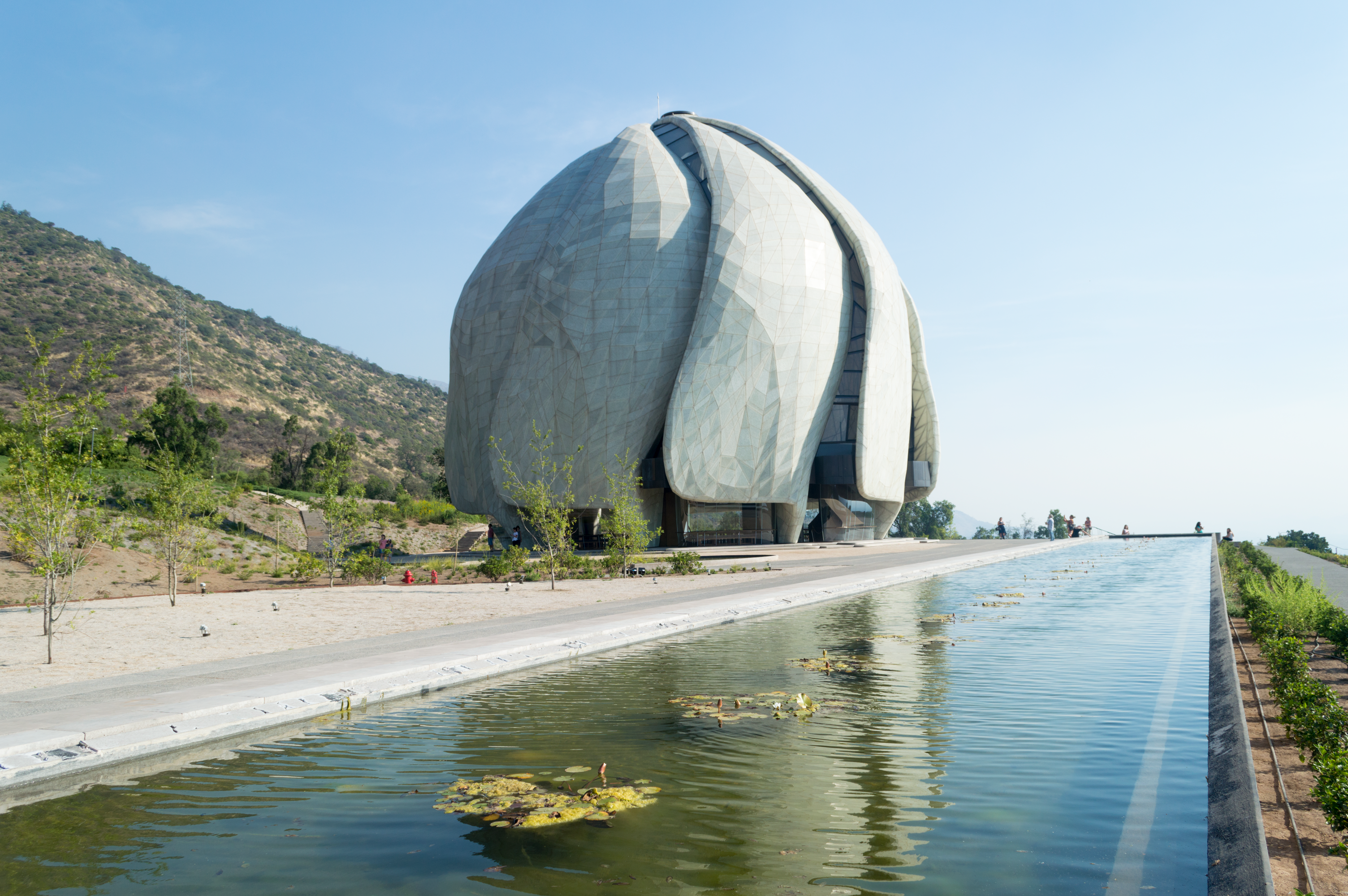
Santiago Baháʼí Temple.

The Baháʼí Faith in Chile begins with references to Chile in Baháʼí literature as early as 1916, with the first Baháʼís visiting the country as early as 1919. A functioning community wasn't founded in Chile until 1940 with the beginning of the arrival of coordinated Baháʼí pioneers from the United States finding national Chilean converts and achieved an independent national community in 1963. The US government estimated 6,000 Baháʼís in Chile as of 2007 though the Association of Religion Data Archives estimated some 26,400 Baháʼís in 2010. In 2024, the Bahaʼí community had 2010 members living in Chile.

In 2002 this community was picked for the establishment of the first Bahá'í Temple of South America. The Santiago Baháʼí Temple was inaugurated in 2016 in Peñalolén, in the Andean slopes over the city. After its dedication, the temple has become an important landmark of the city, receiving thousands of visitors every month.

== Buddhism ==
Buddhism first came to Chile by way of Japanese residents of Brazil migrating to the country. Though still a relatively small percentage of the population, it has grown significantly since the 1990s with 15 different centers across the country mostly of the Zen and Tibetan schools.

In 2024, the Buddhist community in Chile had 18,221 members.

== Hinduism ==
A few Indians had gone to Chile in the 1920s. Others migrated there since the 1970s, not only from India, but also from Trinidad and Tobago, Guyana, Suriname, Hong Kong, Indonesia, Nigeria, Panama, the Philippines and Singapore. The Hindu community in Chile has more than 4530 members in 2024. Among these, around 2372 people lives in the capital city Santiago. Most of the Hindus in Chile are Sindhis. There is a Hindu Temple in Punta Arenas which provide services in both Sindhi and Spanish.

== Sikhism ==
In 2016, after a four-year process, the Sikh religion received legal status. The religion was introduced to Chile by Yogi Bhajan in the late 20th century.

== Wicca ==
According to the TV program Hola Chile on La Red TV channel there are at least 130 Wiccans in the Valparaíso Region. There is also the Escuela de Brujas (School of Witches) in Independencia, Santiago Metropolitan Region that caters to the educational needs of Wiccans in the capitol region.

== Irreligion ==
According to the 2024 Chilean census, 3,903,308 Chileans do not practice any religion, representing 25,7% of the population.

In September 2011, a group of atheists founded the Atheist Society of Chile.

== See also ==
- Benei Sión
- Chilean mythology
