= Jewish Archive of Chile =

Institution that preserves written and audiovisual material about Jews in Chile

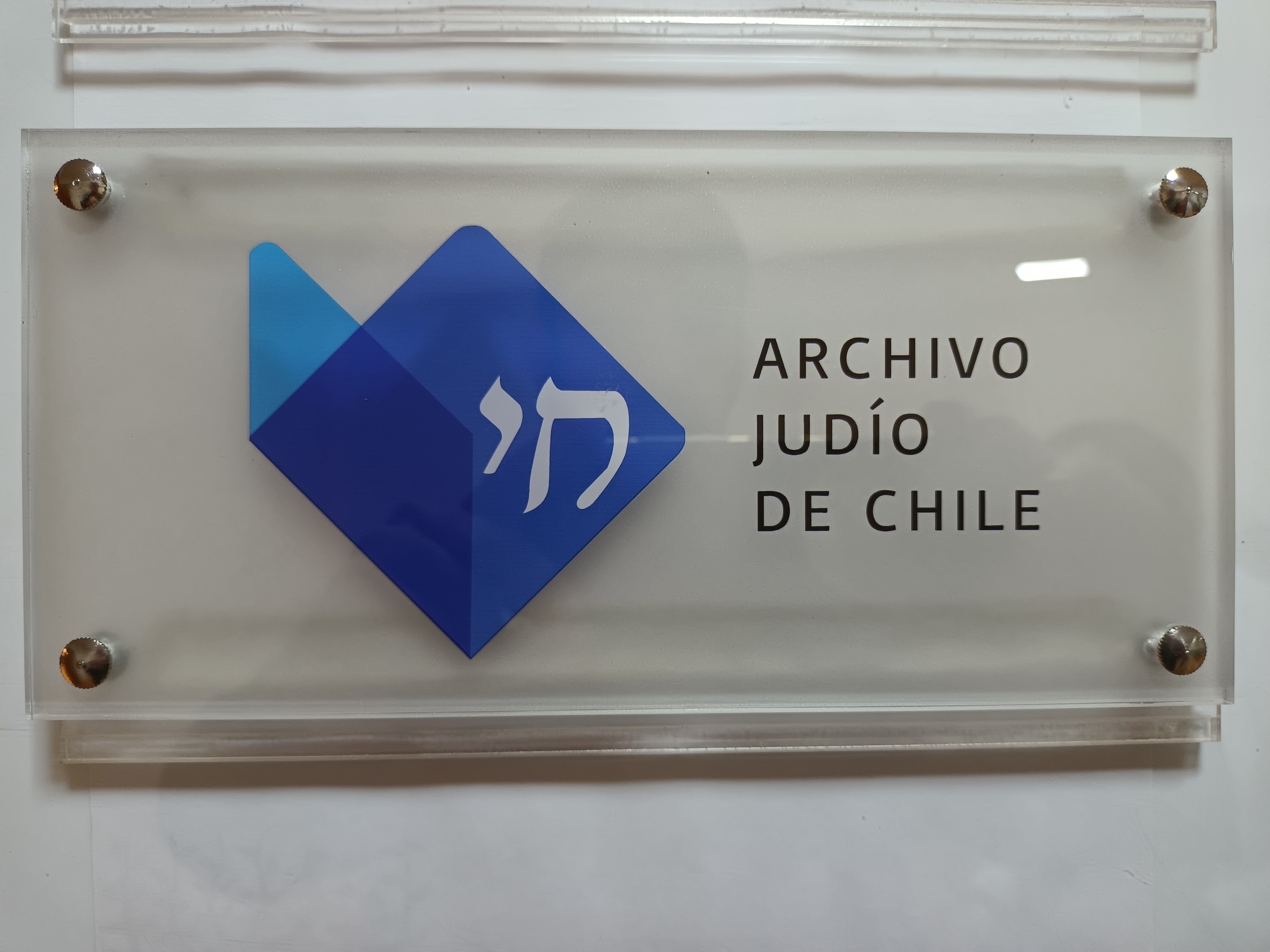
- Type: Non-profit organization
- Founded: 2016
- Headquarters: Providencia, Santiago
- Key people: Judith Riquelme, Executive Director
- Website: archivojudio.cl

The Jewish Archive of Chile (Spanish: Archivo Judío de Chile; AJCL) is a Chilean non-governmental and non-profit organization that preserves a collection of written and audiovisual material from the history of the Jews in Chile. Based in Providencia, Santiago, it was founded in 2016 by the Foundation for the Preservation of the Memory of Chilean Judaism. It was also declared as a National Historical Monument in 2022, mainly due to its collection of unique and exclusive elements, including more than 70 thousand pieces and at least three thousand manuscripts.

== Collection ==
In the archive funds there is a variety of documents, letters, print media, photographs, postcards and other collectible elements of high interest to Judaism and the Jewish diaspora in Chile. The majority has been obtained through donations from Jewish families residing in the country.
