= David Trumbull =

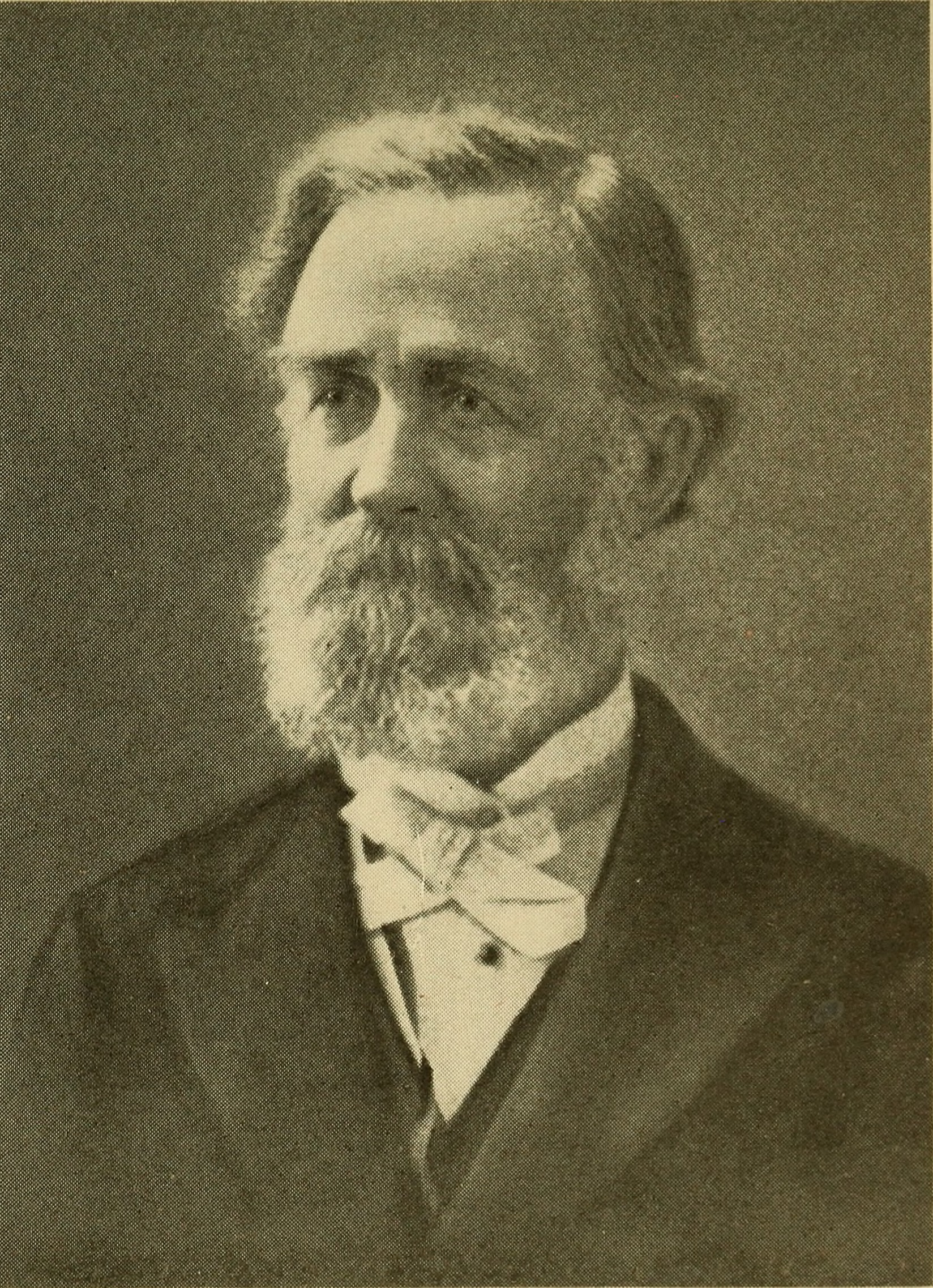
David Trumbull

David Trumbull (November 1, 1819 – February 1, 1889) was an early Protestant missionary in Chile and the founder of the Presbyterian Church in that country.

== Missionary career ==
Trumbull, the son of John M. and Hannah W. (Tunis) Trumbull, was born in Elizabeth, New Jersey, November 1, 1819, his father being a grandson of Governor Jonathan Trumbull, the elder, of Connecticut. He entered early on a business career in New York City, but when the house with which he was connected was blotted out in the commercial panic of 1837, he returned to his father, who had now removed to Colchester, Connecticut, and was prepared at the academy there for the Sophomore class in Yale College.

After graduation in 1842 he spent three years in Princeton Theological Seminary. In 1845, he published The Death of Capt. Nathan Hall: A Drama in Five Acts. In the same year he was ordained at Norwich, Conn., as a foreign missionary on June 13, 1845.

He accepted an appointment to go to Valparaiso, Chile, under the auspices of the Foreign Evangelical Society and the American Seamen's Friend Society, to accomplish what he could in the way of providing opportunities of Protestant worship for sailors and foreign residents speaking the English language. He landed in Valparaiso on Christmas Day, 1845, and began at once what proved to be his life-long work. In 1847 a Union Church was organized, and in 1848 he began the publication of an English paper, The Record.

In 1849 he visited the United States, and was married in New Haven, June 5, 1850, to Jane W. Fitch, a niece of the Rev. Professor Fitch, of Yale College. The next month he sailed again for Valparaiso, which was his home for the rest of his life. He was granted citizenship of Chile in 1886.

During the 1850s, the Trumbulls ran several schools in Chile. He then looked at the legal position of Protestants, particularly in education, marriage and burial rights. In 1863 he published La Lejislacion Respecto a los Matrimonios Mistos: Juzgada a la Luz de los Intereses Morales, Políticos y Relijiosos del País ("Legislation Regarding Mixed Marriages: Judged in the Light of the Moral, Political and Religious Interests of the Country").

The degree of Doctor of Divinity was conferred on him by his alma mater in 1884. In 1879 he was attacked with angina pectoris, and sought rest by a long visit to the United States. In 1886 there was a return of the disease, which was thenceforward kept in control by constant watchfulness. Special exertion at the end of December, 1888, brought on another series of attacks, and his death followed on February 1, in his 70th year. His wife survived him with two sons (graduates of Yale in 1878 and 1883) and two daughters; two other children died in infancy, and three in opening manhood and womanhood,—the deaths of the eldest son (Yale 1876) and of the third son (Yale 1880) being especially sudden and distressing.

Trumbull died in Chile on February 1, 1889.

This article incorporates public domain material from the 1889 Yale Obituary Record.

== See also ==
- Religion in Chile
- Christianity in Chile
- Protestantism in Chile
- William Taylor (bishop) — Fellow missionary in Chile

== Sources ==
- Daniels, Margarette (1916). Makers of South America. New York: Missionary Education Movement of the United States and Canada.
- Smylie, James Hutchinson (1987). Go therefore : 150 years of Presbyterians in global mission. Atlanta: Produced for the General Assembly Mission Board Presbyterian.
