= Abidjan Ivory Coast Temple =

Temple of The Church of Jesus Christ of Latter-day Saints

- Interactive map of Abidjan Ivory Coast Temple
- Number: 205
- Dedication: 25 May 2025, by Ronald A. Rasband
- Site: 3.23 acres (1.31 ha)
- Floor area: 17,362 ft^{2} (1,613.0 m^{2})
- Official website • News & images

Church chronology
← Nairobi Kenya Temple	Abidjan Ivory Coast Temple	→ Syracuse Utah Temple

Additional information
- Announced: 5 April 2015, by Thomas S. Monson
- Groundbreaking: 8 November 2018, by Neil L. Andersen
- Open house: 1-17 May 2025
- Current president: Rex Jay Allen
- Location: Abidjan, Ivory Coast
- Coordinates: 5°21′44″N 3°58′36″W
- Baptistries: 1

The Abidjan Ivory Coast Temple is a temple of the Church of Jesus Christ of Latter-day Saints in Abidjan, Ivory Coast. The intent to construct the temple was announced by church president Thomas S. Monson on April 5, 2015, during general conference. It was announced concurrently with the Bangkok Thailand and Port-au-Prince Haiti temples. It is the first temple in Ivory Coast and the seventh on the African continent.

The temple was designed by FFKR Architects, using a Mid-Century Modern architectural style. A groundbreaking ceremony, to signify the beginning of construction, was held on November 8, 2018, conducted by Neil L. Andersen of the Quorum of the Twelve Apostles.

== History ==
The temple was announced by Thomas S. Monson on April 5, 2015. On October 4, 2018, the church announced that the temple would be constructed in Cocody City in Abidjan, and that a groundbreaking ceremony would take place the following month. On November 8, 2018, a groundbreaking ceremony to signify the beginning of construction took place, with Neil L. Andersen presiding. Also attending were church general authorities Marcus B. Nash and Edward Dube, along with Daniel Kablan Duncan, the country's vice president and former prime minister of the Ivory Coast.

On November 11, 2024, the church announced that a public open house would be held from May 1-17, 2025. Following that open house, the temple was dedicated on May 25, 2025, by Ronald A. Rasband of the Quorum of the Twelve.

== Design and architecture ==
The building uses a Mid-Century Modern architectural style and traditional Latter-day Saint temple design. Designed by FFKR Architects, its architecture reflects both the cultural heritage of the Abidjan region and its spiritual significance to the church.

The temple is on a 0.55-acre plot, with its landscaping having trees, shrubs, and flowers, to provide a setting that enhances the site's sacred atmosphere.

The structure stands one story tall and has a single attached end spire with a statue of the angel Moroni, constructed with lime plaster over concrete blocks. The exterior has decorations around the doors, windows, and cornices, which use geometric patterns based on Mid-Century Modern designs and African tribal decorations.

== Temple presidents ==
The church's temples are directed by a temple president and matron, each serving for a term of three years. The president and matron oversee the administration of temple operations and provide guidance and training for both temple patrons and staff.

The first president and matron are Rex J. Allen and Nancy A. Allen.

== Admittance ==
On November 11, 2024, the church announced the public open house that was held from May 1-17, 2025 (excluding Sundays). The temple was dedicated on May 25, 2025, by Ronald A. Rasband.

Like all the church's temples, it is not used for Sunday worship services. To members of the church, temples are regarded as sacred houses of the Lord. Once dedicated, only church members with a current temple recommend can enter for worship.

== See also ==
- Comparison of temples of The Church of Jesus Christ of Latter-day Saints
- List of temples of The Church of Jesus Christ of Latter-day Saints
- List of temples of The Church of Jesus Christ of Latter-day Saints by geographic region
- Temple architecture (Latter-day Saints)
