= Antisemitism in Chile =

Antisemitism in Chile started in early Chilean history during Spanish colonization and settlement. Now on the decline, antisemitism has resurfaced throughout the country's history to include the 20th-century Nazism of some Chileans with German heritage. Organizations, including the UN, have warned about the rise of antisemitism in the country and denounced the inaction of authorities against antisemitism.

== Background: Jews in Chile ==
Jewish presence in Chile is as old as the history of the country. Over time, Chile has received several contingents of Jewish immigrants. Currently, the Jewish community in Chile comes mainly from the descendants of 19th and 20th century immigrants, mostly of Ashkenazi background. Chile is home to the third-largest Jewish community in South America.

=== Spanish colonization and settlement ===
The first Jews arrived in Chile with the Spanish conquistadors. These were Jewish converts to Catholicism because, at the time of the Inquisition, had to hide their Jewish origin living. Most of this immigration occurred in the early years of the conquest, fleeing religious persecution in Spain, since in the Americas is not yet the court of the Inquisition installed. Diego García de Cáceres, faithful friend and executor of the founder of Santiago, Pedro de Valdivia, was one of them.

In colonial times, the most prominent Jewish character in Chile was the surgeon Francisco Maldonado da Silva, one of the first directors of the San Juan de Dios Hospital. Maldonado da Silva was an Argentine Jew born in San Miguel de Tucumán into a Sephardic family from Portugal. He was accused to the Tribunal of the Inquisition by his sisters, devout Christians, from attempting to convert them to Judaism. Maldonado declared openly Jew, causing him the conviction to be burned alive in 1639. According to a 2010 book, he was imprisoned because he tried to convert his two sisters, who had converted to Catholicism, and they denounced him.

=== Jewish immigration in the 19th century ===
From 1840, decades after the abolition of the Inquisition in Chile, began the Jewish immigration to the country. The first Jews who arrived in Valparaíso were from Europe, especially from Germany and France. One of them, Manuel de Lima y Sola, was a man who became one of the founding members of the Fire Department of Valparaíso in 1851 and one of the founders of the Chilean freemasonry to create the first Masonic lodge, the "Unión Fraternal" two years later.

== Antisemitism from the Inquisition till the 20th century ==
Between the Spanish people which arrived to Chile during the Inquisition were Jews which had been sent away from their home land. The inquisition has been active in Chile until 1813. In that period, many Jews were executed. One of them was Francisco Maldonado De-Silva, a doctor who declared in public about his Jewish religion, and was executed only because of that. De-Silva's life story was published in the book "la gesta marrano". With Chile's independence, Jewish prayers were allowed in public only in 1856. The first official Jewish organization was established in 1909.

== Antisemitism in the 21st century ==
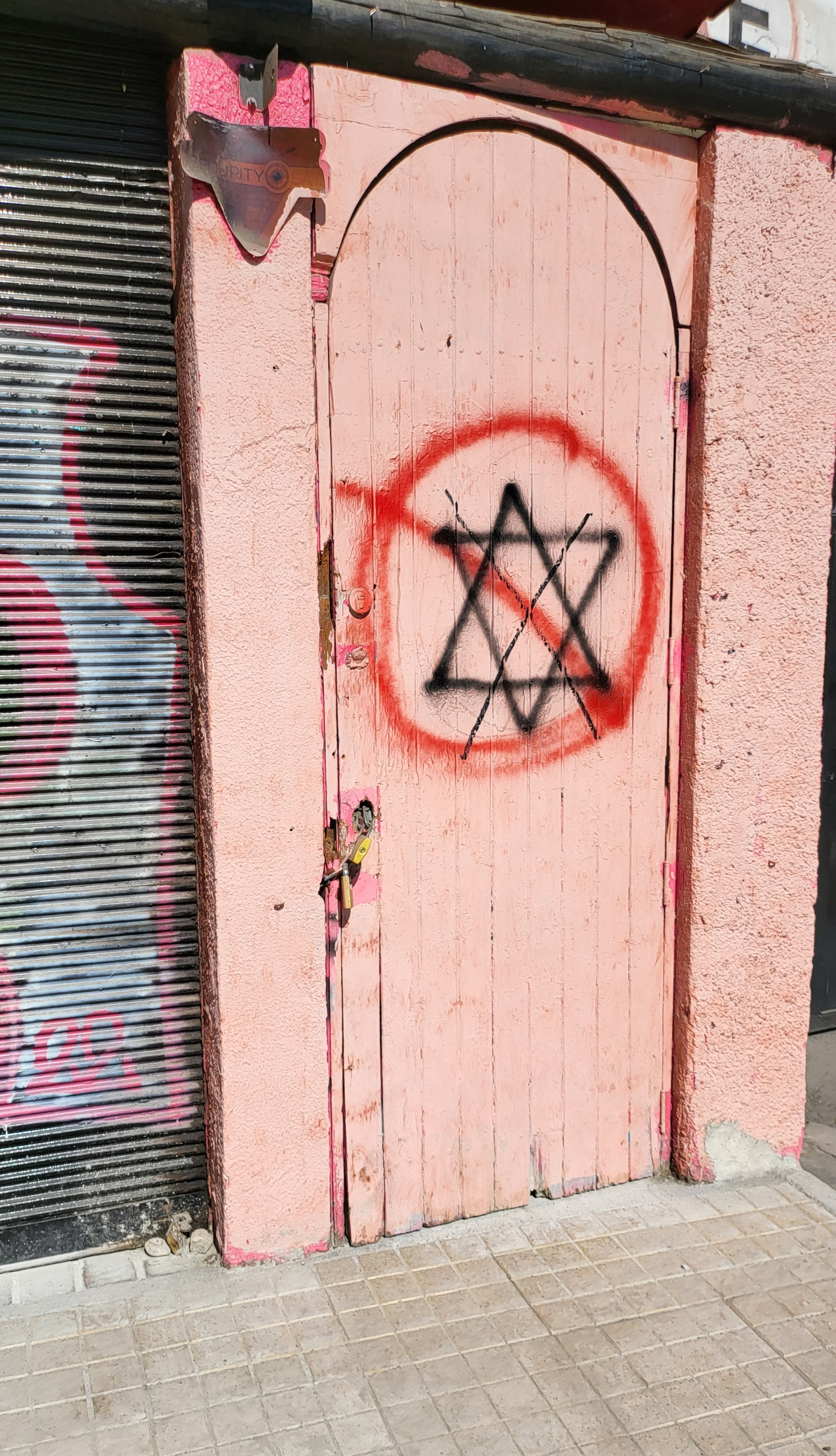
Antisemitic graffiti on a shop door in Santiago, 2025

In 2006, footballer Rodrigo Goldberg faced antisemitic abuse from Palestino fans during a match, due to his Jewish heritage. In 2024, he was once again targeted with antisemitic slurs, this time on social media, which led him to leave his X account inactive.

In 2010, the kindergarten of the Hebrew Institute was vandalized with Nazi graffiti. Alongside a swastika, the message "Juden raus" ("Jews out") was written, using a runic-style "S" resembling the insignia of the Schutzstaffel.

In March 2022, a public hanukkiah monument in Temuco was vandalized with antisemitic messages such as "judíos fuera" ("Jews out") and "sinagoga = Satán" ("synagogue = Satan").

Synagogues in Chile have been the object of antisemitic attacks multiple times. The oldest synagogue in Santiago, Bicur Joilim, has been attacked at least four times since 2023, with three of those incidents occurring while people were praying inside. The 2025 incident followed similar attacks at Jewish places of worship in Viña del Mar, Temuco, and Concepción that same week. The Chilean Jewish community accused authorities of downplaying and denying the antisemitic reality in Chile, which has led to inaction. Organizations such as the UN and the United States Department of State have warned of rising antisemitism in the country, reflected in profanities, hate speech, and harassment.

In June 2026, the hanukkiah monument of Temuco was vandalized again.

== Nazism in Chile ==
Nazism in Chile has a long history dating back to the 1930s. Nazist cells are currently active in many Chilean cities, especially the capital, Santiago, and the southern cities with German heritage.

After the dissolution of the National Socialist Movement of Chile (MNSCH) in 1938, notable former members of MNSCH migrated into Partido Agrario Laborista (PAL), obtaining high charges. Not all former MNSCH members joined the PAL; some continued to form parties of the MNSCH line until 1952. A new old-school Nazi party was formed in 1964 by school teacher Franz Pfeiffer. Among the activities of this group were the organization of a Miss Nazi beauty contest and the formation of a Chilean branch of the Ku Klux Klan. The party disbanded in 1970. Pfeiffer attempted to restart it in 1983 in the wake of a wave of protest against the Pinochet Regime.

Historically Nazism had also detractors in Chile. Example of this is the telegram sent by members of the Congress of Chile to Adolf Hitler after the Kristallnacht (1938) in which they denounced the persecution of Jews.

Even before the Nazi takeover of Germany in 1933 there was a German Chilean youth organization with strong Nazi influence. Nazi Germany pursued a policy of Nazification of the German Chilean community. These communities and their organizations were considered a cornerstone to extend the Nazi ideology across the world by Nazi Germany. It is widely known that albeit there were discrepancies most German Chileans were passive supporters of Nazi Germany. Nazism was widespread among the German Lutheran Church hierarchy in Chile. A local chapter of the Nazi Party was started in Chile.

While Nazi Germany did pursue a policy of Nazification of overseas German communities, the German community in Chile did not act as an extension of the German state to any significant degree.

== Public opinion ==
A survey conducted by Cadem and published on 24 May 2026 showed that only 27% of Chileans think that Jews in Chile are discriminated against "a lot or quite a lot", while 65% think they are discriminated against only "a little or not at all".
