= Syracuse Utah Temple =

Temple in Syracuse, Utah, United States

Coordinates: 41°5′57″N 112°4′33″W

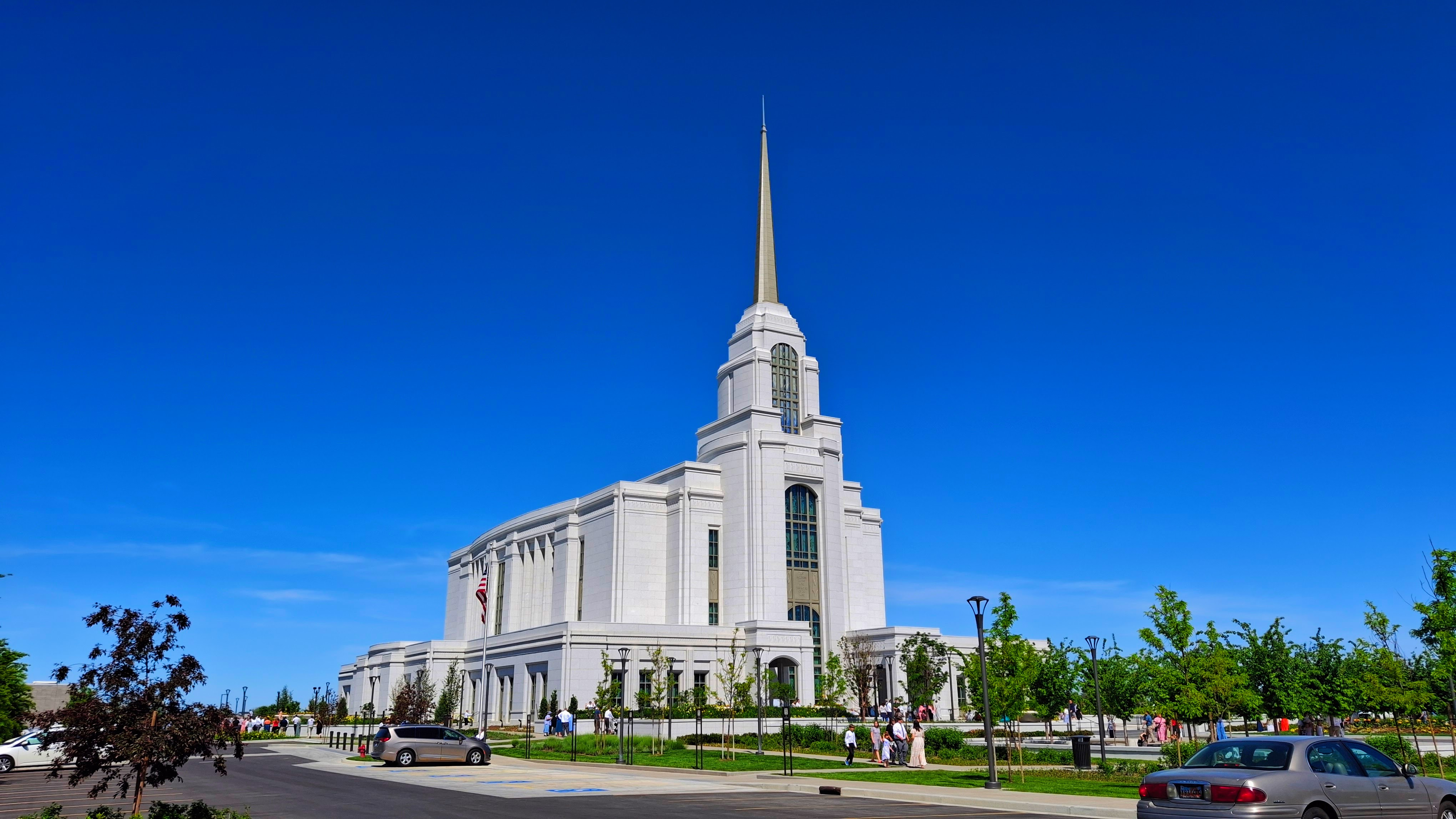
- Interactive map of Syracuse Utah Temple
- Number: 206
- Dedication: 8 June 2025, by Russell M. Nelson
- Site: 12.268 acres (4.965 ha)
- Floor area: 90,526 ft^{2} (8,410.1 m^{2})
- Official website • News & images

Church chronology
← Abidjan Ivory Coast Temple	Syracuse Utah Temple	→ Antofagasta Chile Temple

Additional information
- Announced: 5 April 2020, by Russell M. Nelson
- Groundbreaking: 12 June 2021, by Kevin R. Duncan
- Open house: 10-31 May 2025
- Location: Syracuse, Utah, United States
- Baptistries: 2
- Ordinance rooms: 4
- Sealing rooms: 4

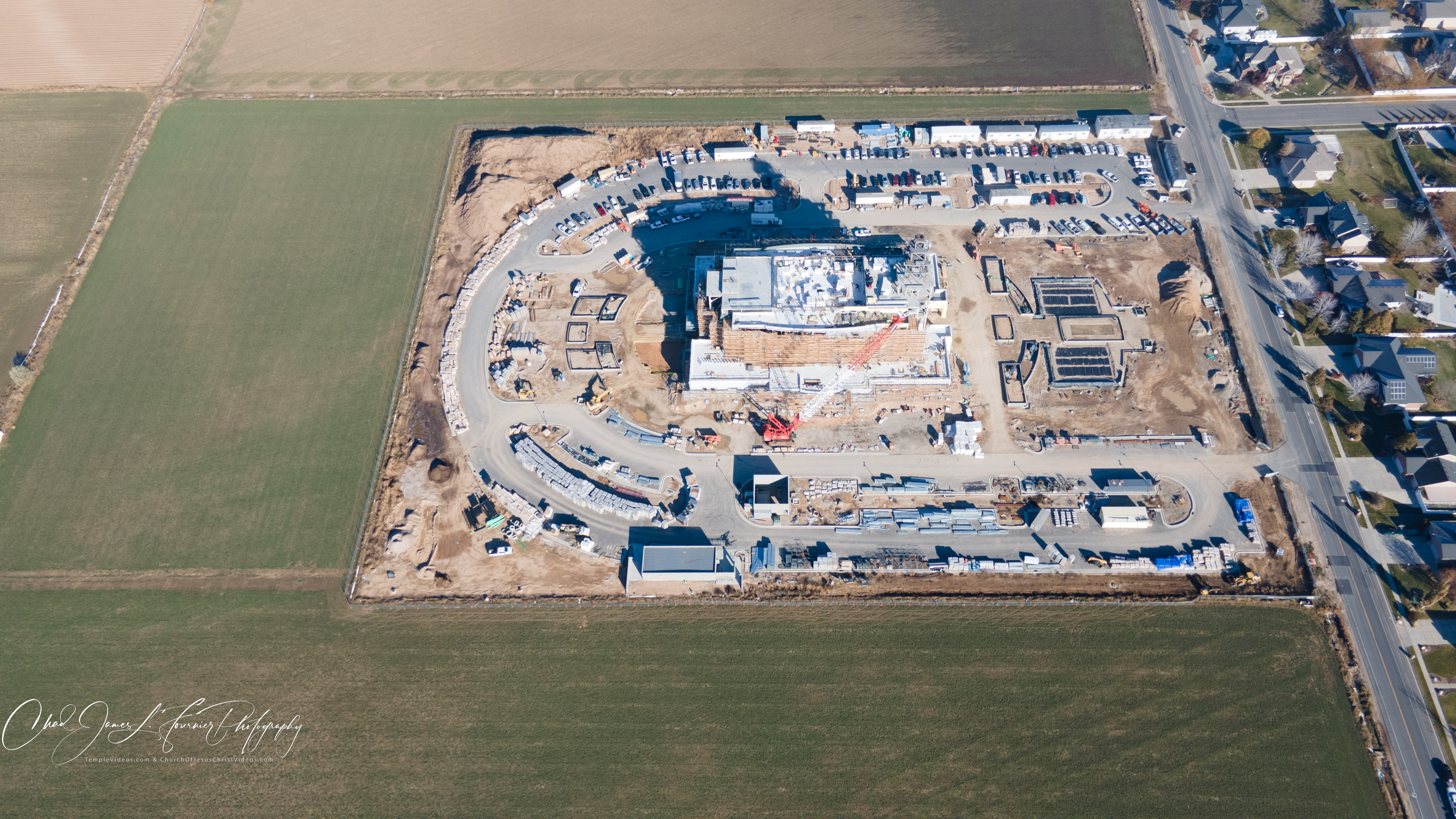
Under construction Syracuse Utah Temple, November 2022

The Syracuse Utah Temple is a temple of The Church of Jesus Christ of Latter-day Saints in Syracuse, Utah, United States. The intent to build the temple was announced on April 5, 2020, by church president Russell M. Nelson, during general conference. On January 29, 2025, the church announced the temple's dedication on June 8, 2025. It will be the 22nd operating temple in Utah, and the third in Davis County.

The temple has a single attached end spire. A groundbreaking ceremony, to signify the beginning of construction, was held on June 12, 2021, conducted by Kevin R. Duncan, a general authority and executive director of the church’s Temple Department.

== History ==
Plans to construct the temple were announced in April 2020 by church president Russell M. Nelson, during general conference. The temple will be the third in Davis County and the 22nd in the state of Utah.

Plans announced in 2021 state the temple will be a three-story building of approximately 89,000 square feet. The groundbreaking for the temple occurred on June 12, 2021. It was the first temple groundbreaking attended by Utah Governor Spencer Cox.

On January 29, 2025, the church announced the public open house that was held from May 10 to 31, 2025. The temple was dedicated by church president Russell M. Nelson in a single session on June 8, 2025.

== Design and architecture ==
The temple's architecture reflects the cultural heritage of Syracuse and its spiritual significance to the church.

The temple is on a 12-acre plot, with surrounding landscaping of patios and flower gardens. The structure stands three stories tall, and is constructed with granite and metal panels. The exterior has arched decorative glass window with the words “Holiness to the Lord: The House of the Lord” in the center. The window is located at the front of the temple’s tower, which supports a tall steeple.

The temple includes four instruction rooms, four sealing rooms, and two baptistries, each designed for ceremonial use.

== Temple presidents ==
The church's temples are directed by a temple president and matron, each serving for a term of three years. The president and matron oversee the administration of temple operations and provide guidance and training for both temple patrons and staff.

On November 28, 2024, the church announced that Val D. Steel and Luann K. Steel will serve as the first president and matron.

== Admittance ==
On January 28, 2025, the church announced the public open house that was held from May 10 to 31, 2025 (excluding Sundays). The temple was dedicated on June 8, 2025.

Like all the church's temples, it is not used for Sunday worship services. To members of the church, temples are regarded as sacred houses of the Lord. Once dedicated, only church members with a current temple recommend can enter for worship.

== See also ==
- The Church of Jesus Christ of Latter-day Saints in Utah
- Comparison of temples of The Church of Jesus Christ of Latter-day Saints
- List of temples of The Church of Jesus Christ of Latter-day Saints
- List of temples of The Church of Jesus Christ of Latter-day Saints by geographic region
- Temple architecture (Latter-day Saints)
