= Protestantism in Chile =

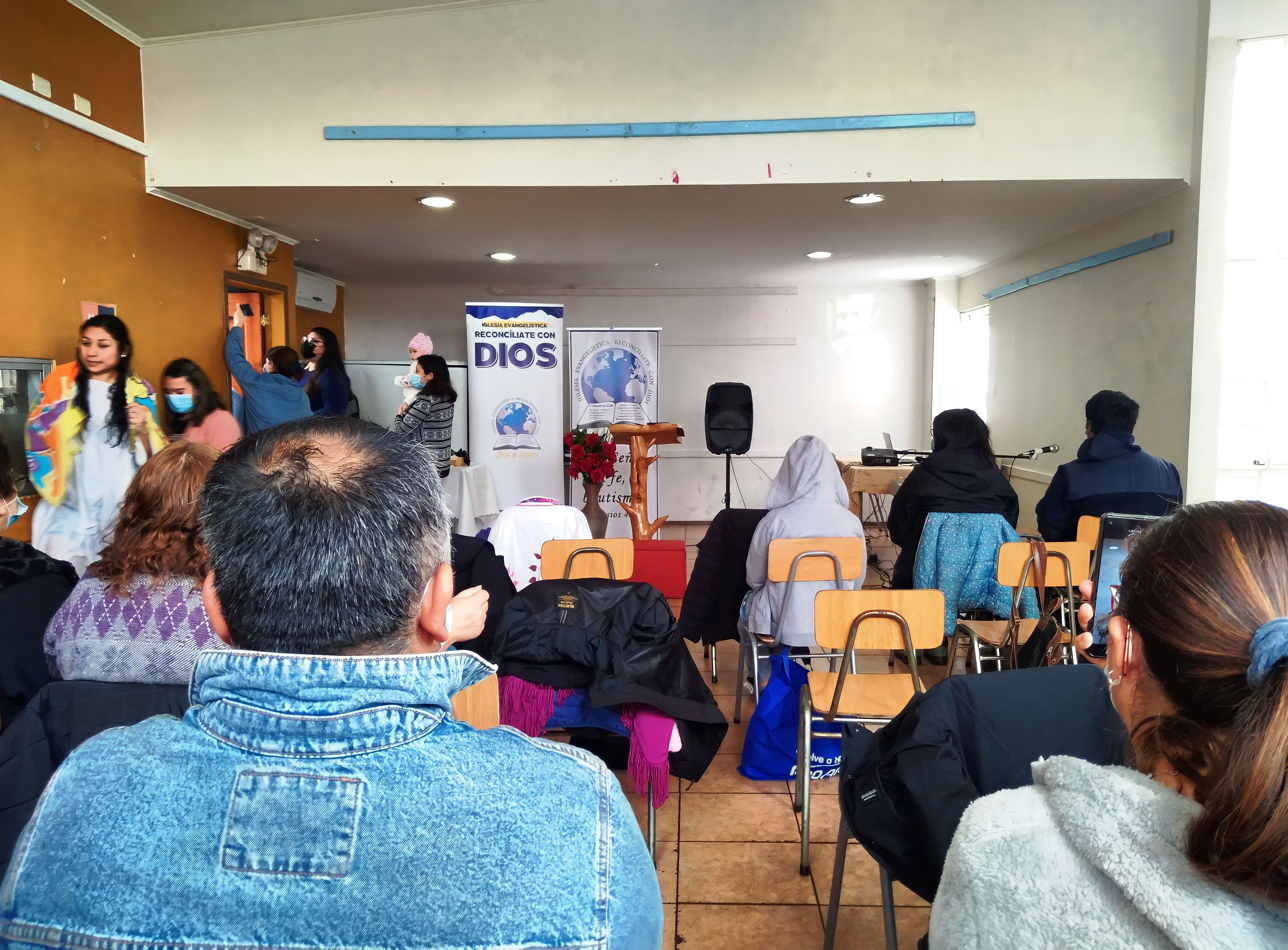
Cult of Reconcíliate con Dios Evangelistic Church, in Ampliación Amanecer Neighborhood's Community Center, Temuco.

Research in 2018 suggested that Protestants represent 11-13% of the population of Chile. Figures in 2022 note that Protestants represented 2.5% of Chilean people in 2022.

Protestants first arrived in Chile in 1812, when missionaries from the British and Foreign Bible Society travelled the country on foot.

In 1848, the first Anglican Church was established in Valparaíso. This was three years after the arrival of the American Congregationalist (later, Presbyterian) missionary David Trumbull. Lutheran German immigrants arrived at the same time. Later, members of the Anglican, Presbyterian, Seventh-day Adventists, Methodist, Pentecostal, and other Protestant Churches also came to Chile.

The first Seventh-Day Adventist missionaries first arrived in 1895. There are estimated to be 126,814 Adventists in Chile.

Changes in the Constitution in 1925 led to numbers of citizens falling away from the Catholic Church and becoming Protestants.

== See also ==
- Religion in Chile
- Christianity in Chile
- Catholic Church in Chile
