= Israelite Circle of Santiago =

Jewish organization in Santiago, Chile

The Israelite Circle of Santiago (Spanish: Círculo Israelita de Santiago; CIS) is a Jewish communal organization in Santiago, Chile. The organization is associated with the traditions of Masorati Judaism and the Latin-American Rabbinical Seminary in Buenos Aires, Argentina.

== Programs ==
The scope of the organization is very broad, providing religious, educational, social, cultural, welfare and support services to the Jewish community of Chile. The organization includes a membership of over 850 families and is one of the most significant Jewish institutions in Chile. The organization's programs and activities include:

- Bet-El youth movement for over 300 children and teenagers
- School for Madrichim, a two year training program for youth leaders
- Beit Midrash Kehilati, study groups for Jewish university students
- Atid, a dance club for girls and women
- C.E.A., a senior center
- Welfare and support services for families in need
- Other social and educational programs and workshops for children and adults.

The Israelite Circle of Santiago also supports the activities of small communities in other areas in Chile, including La Serena, Temuco and mainly, Concepción.

== Synagogue ==
The organization also maintains a synagogue. The synagogue was renovated in 2010 and holds 800 seats, President Piñera attended the opening ceremony. It is thought to be the largest synagogue building in South America with one of the largest active congregations. For the High Holidays, the services are moved to a hotel as up to 4,000 people attend.
