= Benei Sión =

Ethno-religious group in Chile

Benei Sión, also known as Sabatarios and Cabañistas in Chile, are an ethno-religious group that believe in the Iglesia del Nuevo Pacto (Church of the New Pact). The group originated in Chile where it had by 1994 around 6000 members but is present since the early 1950s in Argentina via chain migration where it had 3000 members by 1994. It has been proposed that the group derives from Crypto-Jews active in colonial Chile. While originating in the Araucanía Region of Chile the group deny to be Mapuche (Araucanian). One leader has been quoted saying "We are Jews and that's how we feel, because we have the same aspirations as the Jewish people".

== See also ==
- Amazonian Jews
- History of the Jews in Chile
- Subbotnik Jews
