= Concepción Chile Temple =

Temple of the LDS church

- Interactive map of Concepción Chile Temple
- Number: 160
- Dedication: 28 October 2018, by Russell M. Nelson
- Site: 4.06 acres (1.64 ha)
- Floor area: 23,095 ft^{2} (2,145.6 m^{2})
- Height: 124 ft (38 m)
- Official website • News & images

Church chronology
← Cedar City Utah Temple	Concepción Chile Temple	→ Barranquilla Colombia Temple

Additional information
- Announced: 3 October 2009, by Thomas S. Monson
- Groundbreaking: 17 October 2015, by Walter F. González
- Open house: 15 September-13 October 2018
- Current president: Gabriel Pérez Benavides
- Location: Concepción, Chile
- Coordinates: 36.8513°S 73.0505°W
- Exterior finish: Precast concrete
- Baptistries: 1
- Ordinance rooms: 2
- Sealing rooms: 2

The Concepción Chile Temple is a temple of the Church of Jesus Christ of Latter-day Saints (LDS Church) in Concepción, Chile. The intent to construct the temple was announced by church president Thomas S. Monson on October 3, 2009, during general conference. It was announced concurrently with the Brigham City Utah, Fort Lauderdale Florida, Fortaleza Brazil and Sapporo Japan temples; at the time, the announcement brought the total number of temples worldwide to 151. It is the country's second temple, after the Santiago Chile Temple which was dedicated in 1983.

== History ==
In December 2009, a 2.5-acre site in the Quinta Junge neighborhood of Concepción was acquired by the LDS Church for the construction of a temple. At that time, an apartment complex was under development on the property, with approximately 40 percent of the units already sold. Following the church’s acquisition, the housing contracts were canceled and the partially constructed buildings were removed. The site remained vacant for several years.

On February 27, 2010, a magnitude 8.8 earthquake struck off the coast of Chile, approximately 62 miles north of Concepción. The resulting tsunami and blackout impacted nearly the entire country. In response to Chile’s seismic activity, the temple was constructed on a floating foundation, designed to absorb seismic energy and significantly reduce the perceived intensity of earthquakes for those inside.

A building permit was issued on January 25, 2013, for the temple and associated structures. Several parcels were consolidated to create the temple site. In 2015, an adjacent single-family home was acquired and demolished to complete the property footprint. A rendering of the temple was first presented on April 17, 2013, during a priesthood leadership meeting in Concepción. Later that year, on November 10, Jeffrey R. Holland of the Quorum of the Twelve Apostles publicly presented exterior and interior renderings, which featured artwork inspired by the Chilean landscape.

For several months prior to the groundbreaking for the temple, members organized service projects at the site to clear and prepare the land. On October 17, 2015, Walter F. González, a general authority, presided at a groundbreaking, which signified the beginning of construction. Following construction, a public open house was held from September 15 through October 13, 2018, excluding Sundays.

On October 27, 2018, the day before the dedication, church president Russell M. Nelson met with local civic leaders at the temple. That evening, he addressed a youth devotional attended by 1,500 young people and broadcast to 28,000 more throughout the temple district.

The Concepción Chile Temple was dedicated by Nelson on October 28, 2018, as the church's 160th operating temple. He was accompanied by Gary E. Stevenson of the Quorum of the Twelve Apostles. It was the first temple Nelson dedicated since becoming church president in January 2018.

Before its completion, church members in the region traveled more than 300 miles to attend the Santiago Chile Temple. The Concepción Chile Temple now serves Latter-day Saints in southern Chile and southwestern Argentina. At the time of its dedication, the number of church members in South America had surpassed 4 million, with 18 temples in operation.

In 2020, like all the church's others, the Concepción Chile Temple was closed for a time in response to the COVID-19 pandemic.

== Design and architecture ==
The temple is located in the residential development of Quinta Junge, a forested area next to the Biobío River. The landscaping incorporates native Chilean species, including preserved Chilean Palms and Araucaria (Chilean Pines). Elevated pathways along the west side of the temple offer views of the Biobío River. The temple is as a landmark, especially at night, along Avenida Pedro de Valdivia, the major thoroughfare leading through the south side of the city. The grounds feature palm trees and flower gardens, and an on-site patron housing facility is used for long-distance travelers.

The temple is on 4.06 acres, and uses a neoclassic architectural style with subtle French detailing. Precast concrete simulates faux limestone stucco, and the design includes a dome tower with a gilded angel Moroni statue. The grounds have 96 palm trees and araucarias, some of which originated from the site.

The temple is 124 feet tall and uses the neoclassical style of other historic Chilean churches, following common in 19th-century Chilean architecture. The exterior uses precast concrete to simulate the faux limestone stucco typical of historic buildings in the region.

The Biobío region experiences significant seismic activity, so a base isolation system was used. The temple is supported by 22 pendulum-type isolators, allowing it to move 30 inches in any direction, with additional shock absorbers to reduce movement during seismic events. Slate tile roofing, historically used in both housing and religious buildings in Chile, is used on both the temple and its housing facilities.

The interior uses a color palette of gold, green, and lapis lazuli, which is reflected in the art glass panels, flooring, and bronze railings. Lapis lazuli is also used in the baptismal font and stone floor details. Beige St. Michel limestone from Portugal and Crema Marfil marble from Spain are used in the flooring, with highlights of native Chilean lapis lazuli. Sapele mahogany from Africa is used for the trim and moldings.

Motifs of the Chilean national flower, the Copihue, appear throughout the temple, including in the art glass windows and other details. The Copihue flower, primarily found in southern Chile’s rainforests, is a significant cultural symbol.

Hand-tufted carpets from California, New Zealand, and Thailand are used, and the designed art glass fills the grand stairway and other areas with natural light.

The design has elements representing Latter-day Saint symbolism, to provide deeper spiritual meaning to its appearance and function. Symbolism is important to church members and include the angel Moroni statue, which represents “the restoration of the gospel of Jesus Christ.” The main window in the celestial room is aligned with the sun as it sets behind the Biobío River, symbolizing the glory of the celestial kingdom.

== Temple presidents ==
The church's temples are directed by a temple president and matron, each serving for a term of three years. The president and matron oversee the administration of temple operations and provide guidance and training for both temple patrons and staff. Serving from 2018 to 2021, Joe N. Swenson was the first president, with Jolene S. Swenson serving as matron. As of 2025, Gabriel E. Pérez Benavides is the president, with and Margot F. de Pérez as matron.

== Admittance ==
Following its completion, a public open house was held from September 15 through October 13, 2018, except Sundays, with over 83,500 visitors touring the temple. The temple was dedicated by Russell M. Nelson on October 28, 2018.

Like all the church's temples, it is not used for Sunday worship services. To members of the church, temples are regarded as sacred houses of the Lord. Once dedicated, only church members with a current temple recommend can enter for worship.

== See also ==
Temples in Chile
- = Operating
- = Under construction
- = Announced
- = Temporarily Closed
- Comparison of temples of The Church of Jesus Christ of Latter-day Saints
- List of temples of The Church of Jesus Christ of Latter-day Saints
- List of temples of The Church of Jesus Christ of Latter-day Saints by geographic region
- Temple architecture (Latter-day Saints)
- The Church of Jesus Christ of Latter-day Saints in Chile
