= Bicur Joilim Synagogue =

Synagogue in Santiago, Chile

- Sinagoga Bicur Joilim (Spanish) בית כנסת ביקור חולים (Hebrew)
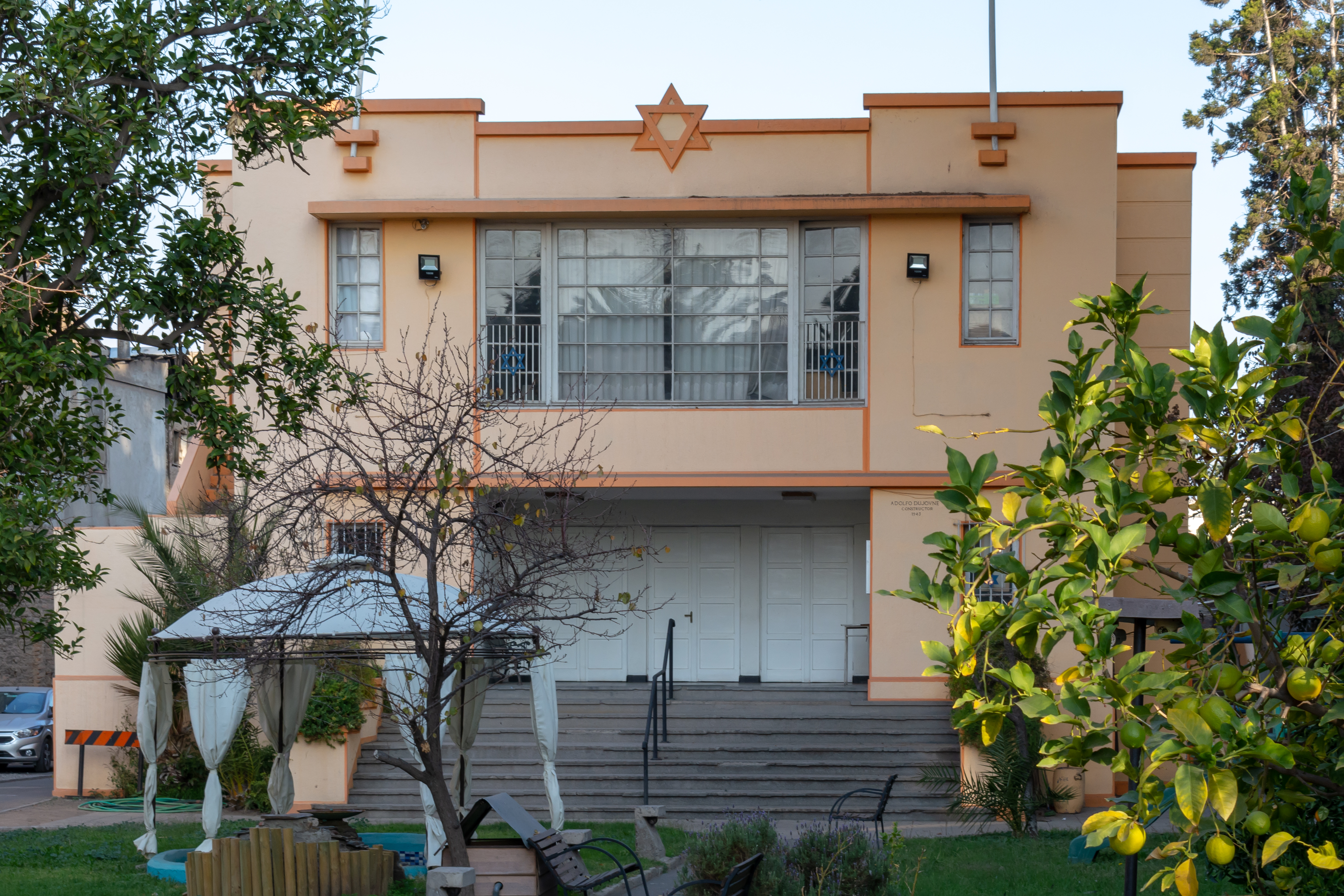
- Facade of the synagogue, 2022

Religion
- Affiliation: Conservative Judaism
- Ecclesiastical or organisational status: Synagogue
- Status: Active

Location
- Location: 624 Manuel Antonio Matta avenue, Santiago
- Country: Chile
- Interactive map of Bicur Joilim Synagogue
- Coordinates: 33°27′30.92″S 70°38′29.09″W

Architecture
- Established: 1905
- Completed: 1930

The Bicur Joilim (Note: Also spelled as Bicur Jolim, Bikur Jolim, Bicur Joilem or Bikur Holim in some sources.) Synagogue (Spanish: Sinagoga Bicur Joilim; Hebrew: בית כנסת ביקור חולים, lit. 'Synagogue for visiting the sick') is a Jewish religious building located in the commune of Santiago, Chile. It is the oldest synagogue in the city of Santiago, founded in 1905, and the only one that remains in the city center. It started as an Orthodox synagogue but is now a Conservative one.

== History ==
The Bicur Joilim Israelite Benevolent Society traces its origins to 1905, when it began as an association of different Jewish institutions. The organization was officially founded in 1917 to provide refuge and protection to Jews fleeing antisemitism in Europe. The synagogue building was inaugurated in 1930 on the site of the former Spanish Women's Orphanage.

Since the 1960s, the synagogue has run a social program distributing food and essentials to people in Santiago.

== Antisemitic attacks ==
Since December 2023, the Bicur Joilim synagogue has been targeted multiple times in antisemitic attacks.

On 22 December 2023, during Shabbat, red paint was thrown at the gates and walls of the synagogue's entrance, along with writings reading "Free Palestine" and "Overthrow Zionism". The writings were described as antisemitic, and the indifference of society, the government, and cultural and academic elites was criticized.

On 3 July 2024, the synagogue was vandalized again with red paint, and pamphlets from the Revolutionary Communist Organization, as well as pro-Palestinian pamphlets, were scattered in front of the building.

On 22 August 2025, during Shabbat, the synagogue was vandalized by three individuals while people were praying inside. They used red spray paint and banners reading "Jew, your silence is complicity", along with anti-Israeli banners and pro-Palestinian pamphlets. This occurred in the context of a series of attacks on other synagogues across the country that same week. The National Office of Religious Affairs of Chile condemned the attack, stating that the act violates religious freedom and deeply harms democratic coexistence.

Less than two weeks later, on 3 September, the synagogue was attacked again by individuals waving Hezbollah flags and threatening those inside; police had to escort people out of the building to prevent further harm.

== See also ==
- History of the Jews in Chile
- List of synagogues in South America
