= Santiago Chile Temple =

LDS Church temple in Santiago, Chile

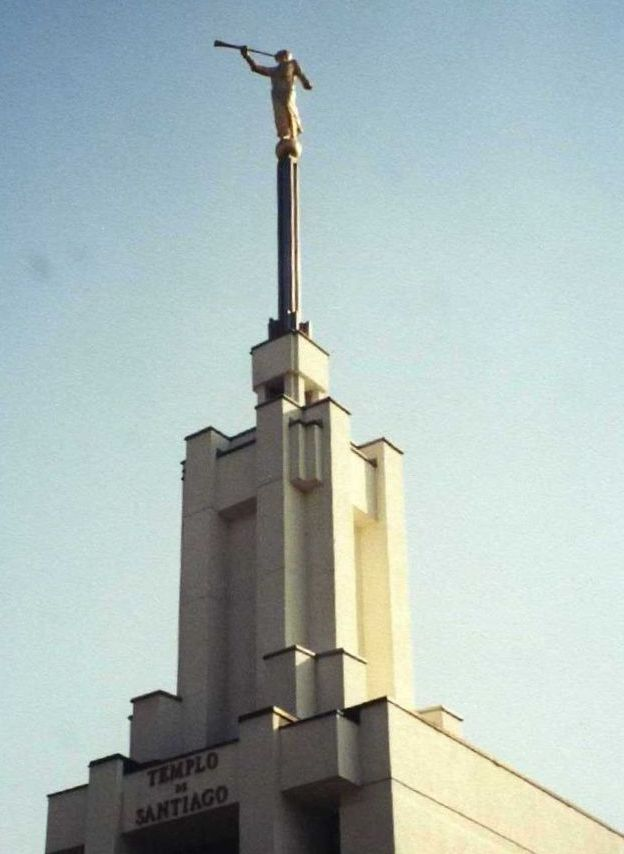
- Interactive map of Santiago Chile Temple
- Number: 24
- Dedication: 15 September 1983, by Gordon B. Hinckley
- Site: 2.61 acres (1.06 ha)
- Floor area: 20,831 ft^{2} (1,935.3 m^{2})
- Height: 76 ft (23 m)
- Official website • News & images

Church chronology
← Nuku'alofa Tonga Temple	Santiago Chile Temple	→ Papeete Tahiti Temple

Additional information
- Announced: 2 April 1980, by Spencer W. Kimball
- Groundbreaking: 30 May 1981, by Spencer W. Kimball
- Open house: 24 August – 8 September 1983; 21 January–11 February 2006
- Rededicated: 12 March 2006, by Gordon B. Hinckley
- Current president: Simon Barrera
- Designed by: Emil B. Fetzer
- Location: Santiago, Chile
- Coordinates: 33°26′10.22640″S 70°36′34.27560″W
- Exterior finish: Stucco on concrete block
- Baptistries: 1
- Ordinance rooms: 2 (stationary)
- Sealing rooms: 3

The Santiago Chile Temple is a temple of the Church of Jesus Christ of Latter-day Saints located in the Providencia district of Santiago, Chile. Announced on April 2, 1980, by church president Spencer W. Kimball, it was the first temple built in a Spanish-speaking country and the second in South America. A groundbreaking ceremony was held on May 30, 1981, and the temple was dedicated on September 15-17, 1983, by Gordon B. Hinckley, then a counselor in the First Presidency. The temple originally had two ordinance rooms, three sealing rooms, and a baptistry. It has a modern design style with a central spire that has a statue of the angel Moroni on its top.

The temple was designed by Emil B. Fetzer, with later expansion designed by Naylor Wentworth Lund Architects. The design includes copihue motifs in art glass and door hardware, and the use of Chilean marble and lapislázuli in the baptistry and entryway. From 2005 to 2006, the temple underwent major renovations that increased its total floor area from 14,572 to 20,831 square feet and refreshed interior finishes. It was rededicated Hinckley, who was then the church's president, on March 12, 2006.

During the 2006 rededication events, 45,000 members gathered at Estadio Monumental, while 4,000 youth participated in a cultural celebration of Chilean music and dance. Tens of thousands toured the temple during its public open houses.

== History ==
The Santiago Chile Temple was announced on April 2, 1980, by church president Spencer W. Kimball, along with seven others. It was the first temple in a Spanish-speaking country and the second in South America.

On May 30, 1981, a groundbreaking was held on the 2.61-acre site at Avenida Pocuro #1940 Providencia, in Santiago. Despite cold rain, thousands of members attended as Kimball presided. The temple was constructed with a central spire with an angel Moroni at 76 feet high, and an initial floor space of 14,572 square feet.

Following construction, a public open house was held from August 24 to September 8, 1983. The temple’s dedication by Gordon B. Hinckley, then a counselor in the First Presidency, occurred in ten sessions from September 15-17, 1983. Members of the Quorum of the Twelve Apostles, Boyd K. Packer and Bruce R. McConkie, also participated, with over 15,000 attending the sessions.

After more than 20 years of use, the temple was closed for expansion and renovation in 2005. After completion, a public open house was held from January 21 to February 11, 2006, attended by more than 62,000 people. It was rededicated by church president Hinckley on March 12, 2006. In 2010, an earthquake knocked the trumpet out of the angel Moroni statue's hand.

== Design and architecture ==
The Santiago Chile Temple was originally designed by Emil B. Fetzer, with later enlargement work designed by Naylor Wentworth Lund Architects.

The temple is on a 2.61-acre plot in Santiago’s Providencia district. The grounds include trees, gardens, and a fountain. The block also contains church administrative and mission offices, a meetinghouse, a distribution center, and housing, which together are commonly referred to locally as “Temple Square.”

The exterior is stucco on concrete block with plan dimensions of 178.6 by 112.5 feet. Its single spire is 76 feet high and has a statue of the angel Moroni.

The temple has two ordinance rooms, three sealing rooms, and a baptistry. Interior features include hand-carved woodwork, art-glass windows with copihue motifs, and Chilean marble and lapislázuli in the baptistry and entryway. The baptistry font is supported by twelve oxen, representing the twelve tribes of Israel, and the building includes Book of Mormon artwork, such as paintings by Minerva Teichert.

=== Symbols ===
Symbolism is reflected in the copihue, Chile’s national flower, incorporated into door hardware and stained glass, as well as in the twelve oxen supporting the baptismal font, representing the twelve tribes of Israel. The angel Moroni atop the spire has historically been a standard symbol of church temples, and the restoration of the gospel of Jesus Christ, along with acting as a lightning rod.

=== Renovations ===
Renovation of the temple began in 2005, designed by Naylor Wentworth Lund Architects, which expanded the building from 14,572 to 20,831 square feet and included new finishes and structural upgrades, ending in 2006 with the rededication.

Interior elements added included hand-carved wainscoting, copihue (the national flower of Chile) motifs in art glass, and inlaid Chilean marble and lapislázuli. Landscaping updates included a water fountain at the entrance.

Following completion of the renovations, an open house was held in early 2006, and the temple was rededicated by church president Gordon B. Hinckley on March 12, 2006.

== Cultural and community impact ==
The surrounding block is often referred to as “Temple Square.” During the 2006 rededication events, 45,000 members gathered for a devotional at Estadio Monumental, and 4,000 youth presented a cultural celebration of Chilean music and dance. Tens of thousands of visitors toured the temple during its open houses, drawing extensive attention from the news media.

== Temple leadership and admittance ==
The church's temples are directed by a temple president and matron, each typically serving for a term of three years. The president and matron oversee the administration of temple operations and provide guidance and training for both temple patrons and staff.. Serving from 1983 to 1985, Eugene F. Olsen was the first president, with Rae J. Olsen serving as matron. As of 2025, the president is Simón Antonio Barrera Arancibia, and Lidia de las Mercedes Del Pino García de Barrera is the matron.

Like all the church's temples, it is not used for Sunday worship services. To members of the church, temples are regarded as sacred houses of the Lord. Once dedicated, only church members with a current temple recommend can enter for worship.

== See also ==
Temples in Chile
- = Operating
- = Under construction
- = Announced
- = Temporarily Closed
- Comparison of temples of The Church of Jesus Christ of Latter-day Saints
- List of temples of The Church of Jesus Christ of Latter-day Saints
- List of temples of The Church of Jesus Christ of Latter-day Saints by geographic region
- Temple architecture (Latter-day Saints)
- The Church of Jesus Christ of Latter-day Saints in Chile
