= List of temples by geographic region (LDS Church) =

In the Church of Jesus Christ of Latter-day Saints (LDS Church), a temple is a building dedicated to be a House of the Lord. Temples are considered by church members to be the most sacred structures on earth.

The LDS Church has 385 temples in various phases, which includes 222 dedicated temples (216 operating, 6 undergoing renovations), 13 with dedications scheduled, 53 under construction, 7 with groundbreaking ceremonies scheduled, and 90 others announced (not yet under construction). At present, there are temples in many U.S. states, as well as in many countries across every populated continent of the world.

Worldwide temples
- = Operating
- = Under construction
- = Announced
- = Temporarily Closed

List of temples by Continent
- North America
  - Canada
  - Caribbean
  - Central America
  - Mexico
  - United States
    - Alabama
    - Alaska
    - Arizona
    - Arkansas
    - California
    - Colorado
    - Connecticut
    - Florida
    - Georgia
    - Hawaii
    - Idaho
    - Illinois
    - Indiana
    - Kansas
    - Kentucky
    - Louisiana
    - Maine
    - Maryland
    - Massachusetts
    - Michigan
    - Minnesota
    - Missouri
    - Montana
    - Nebraska
    - Nevada
    - New Jersey
    - New Mexico
    - New York
    - North Carolina
    - North Dakota
    - Ohio
    - Oklahoma
    - Oregon
    - Pennsylvania
    - South Carolina
    - Tennessee
    - Texas
    - Utah
    - Virginia
    - Washington
    - Wisconsin
    - Wyoming
- South America
  - Argentina
  - Bolivia
  - Brazil
  - Chile
  - Colombia
  - Ecuador
  - Paraguay
  - Peru
  - Uruguay
  - Venezuela
- Africa
- Asia
  - Philippines
- Europe
- Oceania

== North America ==
=== Canada ===
Map	Province	Temple		Location	Dedication/Status	Floor area
Temples in Canada Temples in Alberta: = Operating; = Under construction; = Announced; = Temporarily Closed	Alberta	Calgary Alberta Temple	edit	Calgary, Canada	October 28, 2012	33,000 sq ft 3,100 m^{2}
Temples in Canada Temples in Alberta: = Operating; = Under construction; = Announced; = Temporarily Closed	Alberta	Cardston Alberta Temple	edit	Cardston, Alberta, Canada	August 26, 1923	88,562 sq ft 8,227.7 m^{2}
Temples in Canada Temples in Alberta: = Operating; = Under construction; = Announced; = Temporarily Closed	Alberta	Edmonton Alberta Temple	edit	Edmonton, Alberta, Canada	December 11, 1999	10,700 sq ft 990 m^{2}
Temples in Canada Temples in Alberta: = Operating; = Under construction; = Announced; = Temporarily Closed	Alberta	Lethbridge Alberta	edit	Lethbridge, Alberta, Canada	Under construction	45,000 sq ft 4,200 m^{2}
Temples in Canada Temples in Alberta: = Operating; = Under construction; = Announced; = Temporarily Closed	British Columbia	Vancouver British Columbia Temple	edit	Langley, British Columbia, Canada	May 2, 2010	28,165 sq ft 2,616.6 m^{2}
Temples in Canada Temples in Alberta: = Operating; = Under construction; = Announced; = Temporarily Closed	British Columbia	Victoria British Columbia	edit	Langford, British Columbia, Canada	Under construction	11,400 sq ft 1,060 m^{2}
Temples in Canada Temples in Alberta: = Operating; = Under construction; = Announced; = Temporarily Closed	Manitoba	Winnipeg Manitoba Temple	edit	Winnipeg, Manitoba, Canada	October 31, 2021	16,100 sq ft 1,500 m^{2}
Temples in Canada Temples in Alberta: = Operating; = Under construction; = Announced; = Temporarily Closed	Nova Scotia	Halifax Nova Scotia Temple	edit	Dartmouth, Nova Scotia, Canada	November 14, 1999	10,700 sq ft 990 m^{2}
Temples in Canada Temples in Alberta: = Operating; = Under construction; = Announced; = Temporarily Closed	Ontario	Toronto Ontario Temple	edit	Brampton, Ontario, Canada	August 25, 1990	55,558 sq ft 5,161.5 m^{2}
Temples in Canada Temples in Alberta: = Operating; = Under construction; = Announced; = Temporarily Closed	Quebec	Montreal Quebec Temple	edit	Longueuil, Quebec, Canada	June 4, 2000	11,550 sq ft 1,073 m^{2}
Temples in Canada Temples in Alberta: = Operating; = Under construction; = Announced; = Temporarily Closed	Saskatchewan	Regina Saskatchewan Temple	edit	Regina, Saskatchewan, Canada	November 14, 1999	10,700 sq ft 990 m^{2}

=== United States ===
See List of temples in the United States (LDS Church)

=== Mexico ===
Maps	State	Temple		Location	Dedication/Status	Floor area
Temples in Mexico Temples in Northwestern Mexico Temples in Northeastern Mexico Temples in Central Mexico Temples in Southeast Mexico Temple Icon Color = Operating = Under construction = Announced = Temporarily Closed	Baja California	Tijuana Mexico Temple	edit	Tijuana, Mexico	December 13, 2015	33,367 sq ft 3,099.9 m^{2}
Temples in Mexico Temples in Northwestern Mexico Temples in Northeastern Mexico Temples in Central Mexico Temples in Southeast Mexico Temple Icon Color = Operating = Under construction = Announced = Temporarily Closed	Chiapas	Tuxtla Gutiérrez Mexico Temple	edit	Tuxtla Gutiérrez, Mexico	March 12, 2000	10,700 sq ft 990 m^{2}
Temples in Mexico Temples in Northwestern Mexico Temples in Northeastern Mexico Temples in Central Mexico Temples in Southeast Mexico Temple Icon Color = Operating = Under construction = Announced = Temporarily Closed	Chihuahua	Ciudad Juárez Mexico Temple	edit	Ciudad Juárez, Mexico	February 26, 2000	10,700 sq ft 990 m^{2}
Temples in Mexico Temples in Northwestern Mexico Temples in Northeastern Mexico Temples in Central Mexico Temples in Southeast Mexico Temple Icon Color = Operating = Under construction = Announced = Temporarily Closed	Chihuahua	Colonia Juárez Chihuahua Mexico Temple	edit	Colonia Juárez, Chihuahua, Mexico	March 6, 1999	6,800 sq ft 630 m^{2}
Temples in Mexico Temples in Northwestern Mexico Temples in Northeastern Mexico Temples in Central Mexico Temples in Southeast Mexico Temple Icon Color = Operating = Under construction = Announced = Temporarily Closed	Chihuahua	Chihuahua Mexico	edit	Chihuahua City, Mexico	Site announced	19,000 sq ft 1,800 m^{2}
Temples in Mexico Temples in Northwestern Mexico Temples in Northeastern Mexico Temples in Central Mexico Temples in Southeast Mexico Temple Icon Color = Operating = Under construction = Announced = Temporarily Closed	Durango	Torreón Mexico	edit	Gómez Palacio, Durango, Mexico	Dedication scheduled for 22 November 2026	10,000 sq ft 930 m^{2}
Temples in Mexico Temples in Northwestern Mexico Temples in Northeastern Mexico Temples in Central Mexico Temples in Southeast Mexico Temple Icon Color = Operating = Under construction = Announced = Temporarily Closed	Hidalgo	Pachuca Mexico	edit	Pachuca, Hidalgo, Mexico	Announced; 2 October 2022	TBD
Temples in Mexico Temples in Northwestern Mexico Temples in Northeastern Mexico Temples in Central Mexico Temples in Southeast Mexico Temple Icon Color = Operating = Under construction = Announced = Temporarily Closed	Hidalgo	Tula Mexico	edit	Tula de Allende, Hidalgo, Mexico	Announced; 2 October 2022	TBD
Temples in Mexico Temples in Northwestern Mexico Temples in Northeastern Mexico Temples in Central Mexico Temples in Southeast Mexico Temple Icon Color = Operating = Under construction = Announced = Temporarily Closed	Jalisco	Guadalajara Mexico Temple	edit	Zapopan, Mexico	April 29, 2001	10,700 sq ft 990 m^{2}
Temples in Mexico Temples in Northwestern Mexico Temples in Northeastern Mexico Temples in Central Mexico Temples in Southeast Mexico Temple Icon Color = Operating = Under construction = Announced = Temporarily Closed	Mexico	Toluca Mexico	edit	Metepec, State of Mexico, Mexico	Site announced	19,000 sq ft 1,800 m^{2}
Temples in Mexico Temples in Northwestern Mexico Temples in Northeastern Mexico Temples in Central Mexico Temples in Southeast Mexico Temple Icon Color = Operating = Under construction = Announced = Temporarily Closed	Mexico City	Mexico City Mexico Temple	edit	Mexico City, Mexico	December 2, 1983	116,642 sq ft 10,836.4 m^{2}
Temples in Mexico Temples in Northwestern Mexico Temples in Northeastern Mexico Temples in Central Mexico Temples in Southeast Mexico Temple Icon Color = Operating = Under construction = Announced = Temporarily Closed	Mexico City	Mexico City Benemérito Mexico	edit	Benemerito, Mexico City, Mexico	Site announced	29,000 sq ft 2,700 m^{2}
Temples in Mexico Temples in Northwestern Mexico Temples in Northeastern Mexico Temples in Central Mexico Temples in Southeast Mexico Temple Icon Color = Operating = Under construction = Announced = Temporarily Closed	Morelos	Cuernavaca Mexico	edit	Cuernavaca, Morelos, Mexico	Groundbreaking scheduled for 14 November 2026	19,000 sq ft 1,800 m^{2}
Temples in Mexico Temples in Northwestern Mexico Temples in Northeastern Mexico Temples in Central Mexico Temples in Southeast Mexico Temple Icon Color = Operating = Under construction = Announced = Temporarily Closed	Nuevo León	Monterrey Mexico Temple	edit	Monterrey, Mexico	April 28, 2002	16,498 sq ft 1,532.7 m^{2}
Temples in Mexico Temples in Northwestern Mexico Temples in Northeastern Mexico Temples in Central Mexico Temples in Southeast Mexico Temple Icon Color = Operating = Under construction = Announced = Temporarily Closed	Oaxaca	Juchitán de Zaragoza Mexico	edit	Juchitan de Zaragoza, Mexico	Announced; 6 October 2024	TBD
Temples in Mexico Temples in Northwestern Mexico Temples in Northeastern Mexico Temples in Central Mexico Temples in Southeast Mexico Temple Icon Color = Operating = Under construction = Announced = Temporarily Closed	Oaxaca	Oaxaca Mexico Temple	edit	Oaxaca, Mexico	March 11, 2000	10,700 sq ft 990 m^{2}
Temples in Mexico Temples in Northwestern Mexico Temples in Northeastern Mexico Temples in Central Mexico Temples in Southeast Mexico Temple Icon Color = Operating = Under construction = Announced = Temporarily Closed	Puebla	Puebla Mexico Temple	edit	Puebla, Puebla, Mexico	May 19, 2024	35,861 sq ft 3,331.6 m^{2}
Temples in Mexico Temples in Northwestern Mexico Temples in Northeastern Mexico Temples in Central Mexico Temples in Southeast Mexico Temple Icon Color = Operating = Under construction = Announced = Temporarily Closed	Querétaro	Querétaro Mexico	edit	Querétaro City, Querétaro, Mexico	Under construction	27,500 sq ft 2,550 m^{2}
Temples in Mexico Temples in Northwestern Mexico Temples in Northeastern Mexico Temples in Central Mexico Temples in Southeast Mexico Temple Icon Color = Operating = Under construction = Announced = Temporarily Closed	Quintana Roo	Cancún Mexico	edit	Cancún, Mexico	Announced; 1 October 2023	TBD
Temples in Mexico Temples in Northwestern Mexico Temples in Northeastern Mexico Temples in Central Mexico Temples in Southeast Mexico Temple Icon Color = Operating = Under construction = Announced = Temporarily Closed	San Luis Potosí	San Luis Potosí Mexico	edit	San Luis Potosí City, San Luis Potosí, Mexico	Dedication scheduled for 1 November 2026	9,300 sq ft 860 m^{2}
Temples in Mexico Temples in Northwestern Mexico Temples in Northeastern Mexico Temples in Central Mexico Temples in Southeast Mexico Temple Icon Color = Operating = Under construction = Announced = Temporarily Closed	Sinaloa	Culiacán Mexico	edit	Culiacán, Sinaloa, Mexico	Site announced	10,000 sq ft 930 m^{2}
Temples in Mexico Temples in Northwestern Mexico Temples in Northeastern Mexico Temples in Central Mexico Temples in Southeast Mexico Temple Icon Color = Operating = Under construction = Announced = Temporarily Closed	Sonora	Hermosillo Sonora Mexico Temple	edit	Hermosillo, Sonora, Mexico	February 27, 2000	10,769 sq ft 1,000.5 m^{2}
Temples in Mexico Temples in Northwestern Mexico Temples in Northeastern Mexico Temples in Central Mexico Temples in Southeast Mexico Temple Icon Color = Operating = Under construction = Announced = Temporarily Closed	Tabasco	Villahermosa Mexico Temple	edit	Villahermosa, Mexico	May 21, 2000	10,700 sq ft 990 m^{2}
Temples in Mexico Temples in Northwestern Mexico Temples in Northeastern Mexico Temples in Central Mexico Temples in Southeast Mexico Temple Icon Color = Operating = Under construction = Announced = Temporarily Closed	Tamaulipas	Reynosa Mexico	edit	Reynosa, Mexico	Announced; 6 April 2025	TBD
Temples in Mexico Temples in Northwestern Mexico Temples in Northeastern Mexico Temples in Central Mexico Temples in Southeast Mexico Temple Icon Color = Operating = Under construction = Announced = Temporarily Closed	Tamaulipas	Tampico Mexico Temple	edit	Ciudad Madero, Mexico	May 20, 2000	10,700 sq ft 990 m^{2}
Temples in Mexico Temples in Northwestern Mexico Temples in Northeastern Mexico Temples in Central Mexico Temples in Southeast Mexico Temple Icon Color = Operating = Under construction = Announced = Temporarily Closed	Veracruz	Veracruz Mexico Temple	edit	Boca del Río, Veracruz, Mexico	July 9, 2000	10,700 sq ft 990 m^{2}
Temples in Mexico Temples in Northwestern Mexico Temples in Northeastern Mexico Temples in Central Mexico Temples in Southeast Mexico Temple Icon Color = Operating = Under construction = Announced = Temporarily Closed	Yucatán	Mérida Mexico Temple	edit	Mérida, Yucatán, Mexico	July 8, 2000	10,700 sq ft 990 m^{2}

=== Central America and the Caribbean ===
Maps	Country	Temple		Location	Dedication/Status	Floor area
Temples in Central America Temples in the Caribbean Temples in and near Guatemala Temple Icon Color = Operating = Under construction = Announced = Temporarily Closed	Costa Rica	San José Costa Rica Temple	edit	San José, Costa Rica	June 4, 2000	10,700 sq ft 990 m^{2}
Temples in Central America Temples in the Caribbean Temples in and near Guatemala Temple Icon Color = Operating = Under construction = Announced = Temporarily Closed	Dominican Republic	Santo Domingo Dominican Republic Temple	edit	Santo Domingo, Dominican Republic	September 17, 2000	67,000 sq ft 6,200 m^{2}
Temples in Central America Temples in the Caribbean Temples in and near Guatemala Temple Icon Color = Operating = Under construction = Announced = Temporarily Closed	Dominican Republic	Santiago Dominican Republic	edit	Santiago de los Caballeros	Announced; 6 October 2024	TBD
Temples in Central America Temples in the Caribbean Temples in and near Guatemala Temple Icon Color = Operating = Under construction = Announced = Temporarily Closed	El Salvador	San Salvador El Salvador Temple	edit	Antiguo Cuscatlán, El Salvador	August 21, 2011	27,986 sq ft 2,600.0 m^{2}
Temples in Central America Temples in the Caribbean Temples in and near Guatemala Temple Icon Color = Operating = Under construction = Announced = Temporarily Closed	El Salvador	Santa Ana El Salvador	edit	Santa Ana, El Salvador	Announced; 6 October 2024	TBD
Temples in Central America Temples in the Caribbean Temples in and near Guatemala Temple Icon Color = Operating = Under construction = Announced = Temporarily Closed	Guatemala	Cobán Guatemala Temple	edit	Cobán, Guatemala	June 9, 2024	8,772 sq ft 814.9 m^{2}
Temples in Central America Temples in the Caribbean Temples in and near Guatemala Temple Icon Color = Operating = Under construction = Announced = Temporarily Closed	Guatemala	Guatemala City Guatemala Temple	edit	Guatemala City, Guatemala	December 14, 1984	11,610 sq ft 1,079 m^{2}
Temples in Central America Temples in the Caribbean Temples in and near Guatemala Temple Icon Color = Operating = Under construction = Announced = Temporarily Closed	Guatemala	Miraflores Guatemala City Guatemala	edit	Guatemala City, Guatemala	Dedication scheduled for 11 October 2026	30,000 sq ft 2,800 m^{2}
Temples in Central America Temples in the Caribbean Temples in and near Guatemala Temple Icon Color = Operating = Under construction = Announced = Temporarily Closed	Guatemala	Huehuetenango Guatemala	edit	Huehuetenango, Guatemala	Under construction	10,787 sq ft 1,002.1 m^{2}
Temples in Central America Temples in the Caribbean Temples in and near Guatemala Temple Icon Color = Operating = Under construction = Announced = Temporarily Closed	Guatemala	Quetzaltenango Guatemala Temple	edit	Quetzaltenango, Guatemala	December 11, 2011	21,085 sq ft 1,958.9 m^{2}
Temples in Central America Temples in the Caribbean Temples in and near Guatemala Temple Icon Color = Operating = Under construction = Announced = Temporarily Closed	Guatemala	Retalhuleu Guatemala	edit	Retalhuleu, Guatemala	Site announced	TBD
Temples in Central America Temples in the Caribbean Temples in and near Guatemala Temple Icon Color = Operating = Under construction = Announced = Temporarily Closed	Haiti	Port-au-Prince Haiti Temple	edit	Pétion-Ville, Haiti	September 1, 2019	10,396 sq ft 965.8 m^{2}
Temples in Central America Temples in the Caribbean Temples in and near Guatemala Temple Icon Color = Operating = Under construction = Announced = Temporarily Closed	Honduras	San Pedro Sula Honduras Temple	edit	San Pedro Sula, Honduras	October 13, 2024	35,818 sq ft 3,327.6 m^{2}
Temples in Central America Temples in the Caribbean Temples in and near Guatemala Temple Icon Color = Operating = Under construction = Announced = Temporarily Closed	Honduras	Tegucigalpa Honduras Temple	edit	Comayagüela, Honduras	March 17, 2013	28,254 sq ft 2,624.9 m^{2}
Temples in Central America Temples in the Caribbean Temples in and near Guatemala Temple Icon Color = Operating = Under construction = Announced = Temporarily Closed	Nicaragua	Managua Nicaragua	edit	Managua, Nicaragua	Dedication scheduled for 18 October 2026	24,500 sq ft 2,280 m^{2}
Temples in Central America Temples in the Caribbean Temples in and near Guatemala Temple Icon Color = Operating = Under construction = Announced = Temporarily Closed	Panama	Panama City Panama Temple	edit	Ancón, Panama	August 10, 2008	18,943 sq ft 1,759.9 m^{2}
Temples in Central America Temples in the Caribbean Temples in and near Guatemala Temple Icon Color = Operating = Under construction = Announced = Temporarily Closed	Puerto Rico	San Juan Puerto Rico Temple	edit	San Juan, Puerto Rico	January 15, 2023	6,988 sq ft 649.2 m^{2}

== South America ==
Maps	Temple		Location	Dedication/Status	Floor area
List of temples by geographic region (LDS Church) is located in Argentina	=== Argentina ===				
List of temples by geographic region (LDS Church) is located in Argentina	Bahía Blanca Argentina Temple	edit	Bahía Blanca, Argentina	November 23, 2025	23,400 sq ft 2,170 m^{2}
List of temples by geographic region (LDS Church) is located in Argentina	Buenos Aires Argentina Temple	edit	Ciudad Evita, Argentina	January 17, 1986	30,659 sq ft 2,848.3 m^{2}
List of temples by geographic region (LDS Church) is located in Argentina	Buenos Aires City Center Argentina	edit	Buenos Aires, Argentina	Site announced	TBD
List of temples by geographic region (LDS Church) is located in Argentina	Córdoba Argentina Temple	edit	Córdoba, Argentina	May 17, 2015	34,369 sq ft 3,193.0 m^{2}
List of temples by geographic region (LDS Church) is located in Argentina	Mendoza Argentina Temple	edit	Mendoza, Argentina	September 22, 2024	21,999 sq ft 2,043.8 m^{2}
List of temples by geographic region (LDS Church) is located in Argentina	Rosario Argentina	edit	Rosario, Argentina	Site announced	TBD
List of temples by geographic region (LDS Church) is located in Argentina	Salta Argentina Temple	edit	Salta, Argentina	June 16, 2024	27,000 sq ft 2,500 m^{2}
Temples in Bolivia	=== Bolivia ===				
Temples in Bolivia	Cochabamba Bolivia Temple	edit	Cochabamba, Bolivia	April 30, 2000	33,302 sq ft 3,093.9 m^{2}
Temples in Bolivia	La Paz Bolivia	edit	La Paz, Bolivia	Groundbreaking scheduled for 21 November 2026	18,850 sq ft 1,751 m^{2}
Temples in Bolivia	Santa Cruz Bolivia	edit	Santa Cruz, Bolivia	Under construction	29,000 sq ft 2,700 m^{2}
Temples in Brazil Temples in Eastern Brazil Temples in the State of São Paulo, Brazil	=== Brazil ===				
Temples in Brazil Temples in Eastern Brazil Temples in the State of São Paulo, Brazil	Belém Brazil Temple	edit	Belém, Brazil	November 20, 2022	28,675 sq ft 2,664.0 m^{2}
Temples in Brazil Temples in Eastern Brazil Temples in the State of São Paulo, Brazil	Belo Horizonte Brazil	edit	Belo Horizonte, Brazil	August 16, 2026	28,686 sq ft 2,665.0 m^{2}
Temples in Brazil Temples in Eastern Brazil Temples in the State of São Paulo, Brazil	Brasília Brazil Temple	edit	Brasília, Brazil	September 17, 2023	25,000 sq ft 2,300 m^{2}
Temples in Brazil Temples in Eastern Brazil Temples in the State of São Paulo, Brazil	Campinas Brazil Temple	edit	Campinas, Brazil	May 17, 2002	49,100 sq ft 4,560 m^{2}
Temples in Brazil Temples in Eastern Brazil Temples in the State of São Paulo, Brazil	Curitiba Brazil Temple	edit	Curitiba, Brazil	June 1, 2008	27,850 sq ft 2,587 m^{2}
Temples in Brazil Temples in Eastern Brazil Temples in the State of São Paulo, Brazil	florianopolis Brazil	edit	Florianópolis, Brazil	Site announced	TBD
Temples in Brazil Temples in Eastern Brazil Temples in the State of São Paulo, Brazil	Fortaleza Brazil Temple	edit	Fortaleza, Brazil	June 2, 2019	36,000 sq ft 3,300 m^{2}
Temples in Brazil Temples in Eastern Brazil Temples in the State of São Paulo, Brazil	Goiânia Brazil	edit	Goiânia, Brazil	Site announced	18,850 sq ft 1,751 m^{2}
Temples in Brazil Temples in Eastern Brazil Temples in the State of São Paulo, Brazil	João Pessoa Brazil	edit	João Pessoa, Brazil	Under construction	18,850 sq ft 1,751 m^{2}
Temples in Brazil Temples in Eastern Brazil Temples in the State of São Paulo, Brazil	Londrina Brazil	edit	Londrina, Brazil	Under construction	32,000 sq ft 3,000 m^{2}
Temples in Brazil Temples in Eastern Brazil Temples in the State of São Paulo, Brazil	Maceió Brazil	edit	Maceió, Brazil	Groundbreaking scheduled for 10 October 2026	19,000 sq ft 1,800 m^{2}
Temples in Brazil Temples in Eastern Brazil Temples in the State of São Paulo, Brazil	Manaus Brazil Temple	edit	Manaus, Brazil	June 10, 2012	32,032 sq ft 2,975.9 m^{2}
Temples in Brazil Temples in Eastern Brazil Temples in the State of São Paulo, Brazil	Natal Brazil	edit	Parnamirim, Brazil	Under construction	19,800 sq ft 1,840 m^{2}
Temples in Brazil Temples in Eastern Brazil Temples in the State of São Paulo, Brazil	Porto Alegre Brazil Temple	edit	Porto Alegre, Brazil	December 17, 2000	10,700 sq ft 990 m^{2}
Temples in Brazil Temples in Eastern Brazil Temples in the State of São Paulo, Brazil	Recife Brazil Temple	edit	Recife, Brazil	December 15, 2000	37,200 sq ft 3,460 m^{2}
Temples in Brazil Temples in Eastern Brazil Temples in the State of São Paulo, Brazil	Ribeirão Preto Brazil	edit	Ribeirão Preto, Brazil	Under construction	32,000 sq ft 3,000 m^{2}
Temples in Brazil Temples in Eastern Brazil Temples in the State of São Paulo, Brazil	Rio de Janeiro Brazil Temple	edit	Rio de Janeiro, Brazil	May 8, 2022	29,966 sq ft 2,783.9 m^{2}
Temples in Brazil Temples in Eastern Brazil Temples in the State of São Paulo, Brazil	Salvador Brazil Temple	edit	Salvador, Brazil	October 20, 2024	29,963 sq ft 2,783.7 m^{2}
Temples in Brazil Temples in Eastern Brazil Temples in the State of São Paulo, Brazil	Santos Brazil	edit	Santos, Brazil	Under construction	23,000 sq ft 2,100 m^{2}
Temples in Brazil Temples in Eastern Brazil Temples in the State of São Paulo, Brazil	São Paulo Brazil Temple	edit	São Paulo, Brazil	October 30, 1978	59,246 sq ft 5,504.1 m^{2}
Temples in Brazil Temples in Eastern Brazil Temples in the State of São Paulo, Brazil	São Paulo East Brazil	edit	São Paulo, Brazil	Site announced	46,050 sq ft 4,278 m^{2}
Temples in Brazil Temples in Eastern Brazil Temples in the State of São Paulo, Brazil	Teresina Brazil	edit	Teresina, Brazil	Under construction	25,420 sq ft 2,362 m^{2}
Temples in Brazil Temples in Eastern Brazil Temples in the State of São Paulo, Brazil	Vitória Brazil	edit	Vitória, Brazil	Site announced	10,600 sq ft 980 m^{2}
For location of other temples in Chile, see Argentina map	=== Chile ===				
For location of other temples in Chile, see Argentina map	Antofagasta Chile Temple	edit	Antofagasta, Chile	June 15, 2025	26,163 sq ft 2,430.6 m^{2}
For location of other temples in Chile, see Argentina map	Concepción Chile Temple	edit	Concepción, Chile	October 28, 2018	23,095 sq ft 2,145.6 m^{2}
For location of other temples in Chile, see Argentina map	Puerto Montt Chile	edit	Puerto Montt, Chile	Site announced	18,500 sq ft 1,720 m^{2}
For location of other temples in Chile, see Argentina map	Santiago Chile Temple	edit	Santiago, Chile	September 15, 1983	20,831 sq ft 1,935.3 m^{2}
For location of other temples in Chile, see Argentina map	Santiago West Chile	edit	Santiago, Chile	Under construction	12,500 sq ft 1,160 m^{2}
For location of other temples in Chile, see Argentina map	Viña del Mar Chile	edit	Viña del Mar, Valparaíso, Chile	Site announced	30,000 sq ft 2,800 m^{2}
Temples in Ecuador and Colombia	=== Colombia ===				
Temples in Ecuador and Colombia	Barranquilla Colombia Temple	edit	Puerto Colombia, Colombia	December 9, 2018	25,349 sq ft 2,355.0 m^{2}
Temples in Ecuador and Colombia	Bogotá Colombia Temple	edit	Bogotá, Colombia	April 24, 1999	53,500 sq ft 4,970 m^{2}
Temples in Ecuador and Colombia	Cali Colombia	edit	Cali, Colombia	Under construction	9,500 sq ft 880 m^{2}
Temples in Ecuador and Colombia	Medellín Colombia	edit	Medellín, Colombia	Site announced	10,741 sq ft 997.9 m^{2}
Temples in Ecuador and Colombia	=== Ecuador ===				
Temples in Ecuador and Colombia	Guayaquil Ecuador Temple	edit	Guayaquil, Ecuador	August 1, 1999	45,000 sq ft 4,200 m^{2}
Temples in Ecuador and Colombia	Otavalo Ecuador	edit	Otavalo, Ecuador	Site announced	18,850 sq ft 1,751 m^{2}
Temples in Ecuador and Colombia	Quito Ecuador Temple	edit	Quito, Ecuador	November 20, 2022	36,780 sq ft 3,417 m^{2}
For location on regional map, see Argentina map	=== Paraguay ===				
For location on regional map, see Argentina map	Asunción Paraguay Temple	edit	Asunción, Paraguay	May 19, 2002	11,906 sq ft 1,106.1 m^{2}
List of temples by geographic region (LDS Church) is located in Peru List of temples by geographic region (LDS Church) is located in Lima Peru	=== Peru ===				
List of temples by geographic region (LDS Church) is located in Peru List of temples by geographic region (LDS Church) is located in Lima Peru	Arequipa Peru Temple	edit	Arequipa, Peru	December 15, 2019	26,969 sq ft 2,505.5 m^{2}
List of temples by geographic region (LDS Church) is located in Peru List of temples by geographic region (LDS Church) is located in Lima Peru	Chiclayo Peru	edit	Chiclayo, Peru	Announced; 2 October 2022	TBD
List of temples by geographic region (LDS Church) is located in Peru List of temples by geographic region (LDS Church) is located in Lima Peru	Chorrillos Peru	edit	Chorrillos, Peru	Announced; 6 April 2025	TBD
List of temples by geographic region (LDS Church) is located in Peru List of temples by geographic region (LDS Church) is located in Lima Peru	Cusco Peru	edit	Cusco, Peru	Site announced	9,950 sq ft 924 m^{2}
List of temples by geographic region (LDS Church) is located in Peru List of temples by geographic region (LDS Church) is located in Lima Peru	Huancayo Peru	edit	Huancayo, Peru	Announced; 1 October 2023	TBD
List of temples by geographic region (LDS Church) is located in Peru List of temples by geographic region (LDS Church) is located in Lima Peru	Iquitos Peru	edit	Iquitos, Peru	Groundbreaking scheduled for 10 October 2026	20,000 sq ft 1,900 m^{2}
List of temples by geographic region (LDS Church) is located in Peru List of temples by geographic region (LDS Church) is located in Lima Peru	Lima Peru Temple	edit	La Molina, Lima, Peru	January 10, 1986	9,600 sq ft 890 m^{2}
List of temples by geographic region (LDS Church) is located in Peru List of temples by geographic region (LDS Church) is located in Lima Peru	Lima Peru Los Olivos Temple	edit	San Martin de Porres, Lima, Peru	January 14, 2024	47,413 sq ft 4,404.8 m^{2}
List of temples by geographic region (LDS Church) is located in Peru List of temples by geographic region (LDS Church) is located in Lima Peru	Piura Peru	edit	Piura, Peru	Groundbreaking scheduled for 14 November 2026	18,850 sq ft 1,751 m^{2}
List of temples by geographic region (LDS Church) is located in Peru List of temples by geographic region (LDS Church) is located in Lima Peru	Trujillo Peru Temple	edit	Trujillo, Peru	June 21, 2015	28,200 sq ft 2,620 m^{2}
List of temples by geographic region (LDS Church) is located in Uruguay	=== Uruguay ===				
List of temples by geographic region (LDS Church) is located in Uruguay	Montevideo Uruguay Temple	edit	Montevideo, Uruguay	March 18, 2001	10,700 sq ft 990 m^{2}
List of temples by geographic region (LDS Church) is located in Uruguay	Rivera Uruguay	edit	Rivera, Uruguay	Announced; 6 April 2025	TBD
List of temples by geographic region (LDS Church) is located in Venezuela	=== Venezuela ===				
List of temples by geographic region (LDS Church) is located in Venezuela	Caracas Venezuela Temple	edit	Caracas, Venezuela	August 20, 2000	15,332 sq ft 1,424.4 m^{2}
List of temples by geographic region (LDS Church) is located in Venezuela	Maracaibo Venezuela	edit	Maracaibo, Venezuela	Announced; 7 April 2024	TBD

== Europe ==
Maps	Country	Temple		Location	Dedication/Status	Floor area
Temples in Europe Temples in Scandinavia Temples in Western Europe Temples in Central Europe Temple Icon Color = Operating = Under construction = Announced = Temporarily Closed	Austria	Vienna Austria	edit	Vienna, Austria	Groundbreaking scheduled for 17 October 2026	15,300 sq ft 1,420 m^{2}
Temples in Europe Temples in Scandinavia Temples in Western Europe Temples in Central Europe Temple Icon Color = Operating = Under construction = Announced = Temporarily Closed	Belgium	Brussels Belgium	edit	Brussels, Belgium	Under construction	25,500 sq ft 2,370 m^{2}
Temples in Europe Temples in Scandinavia Temples in Western Europe Temples in Central Europe Temple Icon Color = Operating = Under construction = Announced = Temporarily Closed	Denmark	Copenhagen Denmark Temple	edit	Frederiksberg, Denmark	May 23, 2004	25,000 sq ft 2,300 m^{2}
Temples in Europe Temples in Scandinavia Temples in Western Europe Temples in Central Europe Temple Icon Color = Operating = Under construction = Announced = Temporarily Closed	Finland	Helsinki Finland Temple	edit	Espoo, Finland	October 22, 2006	16,350 sq ft 1,519 m^{2}
Temples in Europe Temples in Scandinavia Temples in Western Europe Temples in Central Europe Temple Icon Color = Operating = Under construction = Announced = Temporarily Closed	France	Paris France Temple	edit	Le Chesnay, France	May 21, 2017	44,175 sq ft 4,104.0 m^{2}
Temples in Europe Temples in Scandinavia Temples in Western Europe Temples in Central Europe Temple Icon Color = Operating = Under construction = Announced = Temporarily Closed	Germany	Frankfurt Germany Temple	edit	Friedrichsdorf, Germany	August 28, 1987	32,895 sq ft 3,056.0 m^{2}
Temples in Europe Temples in Scandinavia Temples in Western Europe Temples in Central Europe Temple Icon Color = Operating = Under construction = Announced = Temporarily Closed	Germany	Freiberg Germany Temple	edit	Freiberg, Germany	June 29, 1985	21,500 sq ft 2,000 m^{2}
Temples in Europe Temples in Scandinavia Temples in Western Europe Temples in Central Europe Temple Icon Color = Operating = Under construction = Announced = Temporarily Closed	Germany	Hamburg Germany	edit	Hamburg, Germany	Site announced	TBD
Temples in Europe Temples in Scandinavia Temples in Western Europe Temples in Central Europe Temple Icon Color = Operating = Under construction = Announced = Temporarily Closed	Hungary	Budapest Hungary	edit	Budapest, Hungary	Under construction	18,000 sq ft 1,700 m^{2}
Temples in Europe Temples in Scandinavia Temples in Western Europe Temples in Central Europe Temple Icon Color = Operating = Under construction = Announced = Temporarily Closed	Ireland	Dublin Ireland	edit	Dublin, Ireland	Announced; 6 October 2024	TBD
Temples in Europe Temples in Scandinavia Temples in Western Europe Temples in Central Europe Temple Icon Color = Operating = Under construction = Announced = Temporarily Closed	Italy	Milan Italy	edit	Milan, Italy	Announced; 6 October 2024	TBD
Temples in Europe Temples in Scandinavia Temples in Western Europe Temples in Central Europe Temple Icon Color = Operating = Under construction = Announced = Temporarily Closed	Italy	Rome Italy Temple	edit	Rome, Italy	March 10, 2019	41,010 sq ft 3,810 m^{2}
Temples in Europe Temples in Scandinavia Temples in Western Europe Temples in Central Europe Temple Icon Color = Operating = Under construction = Announced = Temporarily Closed	Netherlands	The Hague Netherlands Temple	edit	Zoetermeer, Netherlands	September 8, 2002	14,477 sq ft 1,345.0 m^{2}
Temples in Europe Temples in Scandinavia Temples in Western Europe Temples in Central Europe Temple Icon Color = Operating = Under construction = Announced = Temporarily Closed	Norway	Oslo Norway	edit	Hvalstad, Norway	Site announced	10,800 sq ft 1,000 m^{2}
Temples in Europe Temples in Scandinavia Temples in Western Europe Temples in Central Europe Temple Icon Color = Operating = Under construction = Announced = Temporarily Closed	Portugal	Lisbon Portugal Temple	edit	Lisbon, Portugal	September 15, 2019	23,730 sq ft 2,205 m^{2}
Temples in Europe Temples in Scandinavia Temples in Western Europe Temples in Central Europe Temple Icon Color = Operating = Under construction = Announced = Temporarily Closed	Portugal	Porto Portugal	edit	Porto, Portugal	Announced; 6 April 2025	TBD
Temples in Europe Temples in Scandinavia Temples in Western Europe Temples in Central Europe Temple Icon Color = Operating = Under construction = Announced = Temporarily Closed	Russia	Russia	edit	Russia	Announced; 1 April 2018	TBD
Temples in Europe Temples in Scandinavia Temples in Western Europe Temples in Central Europe Temple Icon Color = Operating = Under construction = Announced = Temporarily Closed	Spain	Madrid Spain Temple	edit	Madrid, Spain	March 19, 1999	45,800 sq ft 4,250 m^{2}
Temples in Europe Temples in Scandinavia Temples in Western Europe Temples in Central Europe Temple Icon Color = Operating = Under construction = Announced = Temporarily Closed	Spain	Barcelona Spain	edit	Sant Cugat del Vallès, Spain	Under construction	27,500 sq ft 2,550 m^{2}
Temples in Europe Temples in Scandinavia Temples in Western Europe Temples in Central Europe Temple Icon Color = Operating = Under construction = Announced = Temporarily Closed	Sweden	Stockholm Sweden	edit	Västerhaninge, Sweden	Closed for renovation	31,000 sq ft 2,900 m^{2}
Temples in Europe Temples in Scandinavia Temples in Western Europe Temples in Central Europe Temple Icon Color = Operating = Under construction = Announced = Temporarily Closed	Switzerland	Bern Switzerland Temple	edit	Münchenbuchsee, Switzerland	September 11, 1955	35,546 sq ft 3,302.3 m^{2}
Temples in Europe Temples in Scandinavia Temples in Western Europe Temples in Central Europe Temple Icon Color = Operating = Under construction = Announced = Temporarily Closed	Ukraine	Kyiv Ukraine Temple	edit	Sofiivska Borshchahivka, Ukraine	August 29, 2010	22,184 sq ft 2,061.0 m^{2}
Temples in Europe Temples in Scandinavia Temples in Western Europe Temples in Central Europe Temple Icon Color = Operating = Under construction = Announced = Temporarily Closed	United Kingdom	Birmingham England	edit	Sutton Coldfield, Birmingham, England	Under construction	10,800 sq ft 1,000 m^{2}
Temples in Europe Temples in Scandinavia Temples in Western Europe Temples in Central Europe Temple Icon Color = Operating = Under construction = Announced = Temporarily Closed	United Kingdom	London England Temple	edit	Newchapel, Surrey, England	September 7, 1958	42,652 sq ft 3,962.5 m^{2}
Temples in Europe Temples in Scandinavia Temples in Western Europe Temples in Central Europe Temple Icon Color = Operating = Under construction = Announced = Temporarily Closed	United Kingdom	Preston England Temple	edit	Chorley, Lancashire, England	June 7, 1998	69,630 sq ft 6,469 m^{2}
Temples in Europe Temples in Scandinavia Temples in Western Europe Temples in Central Europe Temple Icon Color = Operating = Under construction = Announced = Temporarily Closed	United Kingdom	Edinburgh Scotland	edit	Edinburgh, Scotland	Announced; 7 April 2024	TBD

== Africa ==
For many years, the only temple was the Johannesburg South Africa Temple. Now there are several across the continent, with Africa being one of the fastest-growing areas of the church.

Maps	Country	Temple		Location	Dedication/Status	Floor area
Temples in Africa Temples in Western Africa Temples in Southern and Central Africa Temples in Nigeria Temples in Southeastern Nigeria Temples in Ghana Temple Icon Color = Operating = Under construction = Announced = Temporarily Closed	Angola	Luanda Angola	edit	Luanda, Angola	Announced; 1 October 2023	TBD
Temples in Africa Temples in Western Africa Temples in Southern and Central Africa Temples in Nigeria Temples in Southeastern Nigeria Temples in Ghana Temple Icon Color = Operating = Under construction = Announced = Temporarily Closed	Cape Verde	Praia Cape Verde Temple	edit	Praia, Cape Verde	June 19, 2022	8,759 sq ft 813.7 m^{2}
Temples in Africa Temples in Western Africa Temples in Southern and Central Africa Temples in Nigeria Temples in Southeastern Nigeria Temples in Ghana Temple Icon Color = Operating = Under construction = Announced = Temporarily Closed	the Democratic Republic of the Congo	Kananga DR Congo	edit	Kananga, Democratic Republic of the Congo	Site announced	11,000 sq ft 1,000 m^{2}
Temples in Africa Temples in Western Africa Temples in Southern and Central Africa Temples in Nigeria Temples in Southeastern Nigeria Temples in Ghana Temple Icon Color = Operating = Under construction = Announced = Temporarily Closed	the Democratic Republic of the Congo	Kinshasa DR Congo	edit	Kinshasa, Democratic Republic of the Congo	April 14, 2019	12,000 sq ft 1,100 m^{2}
Temples in Africa Temples in Western Africa Temples in Southern and Central Africa Temples in Nigeria Temples in Southeastern Nigeria Temples in Ghana Temple Icon Color = Operating = Under construction = Announced = Temporarily Closed	the Democratic Republic of the Congo	Lubumbashi DR Congo	edit	Lubumbashi, Democratic Republic of the Congo	Under construction	19,300 sq ft 1,790 m^{2}
Temples in Africa Temples in Western Africa Temples in Southern and Central Africa Temples in Nigeria Temples in Southeastern Nigeria Temples in Ghana Temple Icon Color = Operating = Under construction = Announced = Temporarily Closed	the Democratic Republic of the Congo	Mbuji-Mayi DR Congo	edit	Mbuji-Mayi, Democratic Republic of the Congo	Announced; 1 October 2023	TBD
Temples in Africa Temples in Western Africa Temples in Southern and Central Africa Temples in Nigeria Temples in Southeastern Nigeria Temples in Ghana Temple Icon Color = Operating = Under construction = Announced = Temporarily Closed	Ghana	Accra Ghana Temple	edit	Accra, Ghana	January 11, 2004	17,500 sq ft 1,630 m^{2}
Temples in Africa Temples in Western Africa Temples in Southern and Central Africa Temples in Nigeria Temples in Southeastern Nigeria Temples in Ghana Temple Icon Color = Operating = Under construction = Announced = Temporarily Closed	Ghana	Cape Coast Ghana	edit	Cape Coast, Ghana	Announced; 1 October 2023	TBD
Temples in Africa Temples in Western Africa Temples in Southern and Central Africa Temples in Nigeria Temples in Southeastern Nigeria Temples in Ghana Temple Icon Color = Operating = Under construction = Announced = Temporarily Closed	Ghana	Kumasi Ghana	edit	Kumasi, Ghana	Under construction	22,750 sq ft 2,114 m^{2}
Temples in Africa Temples in Western Africa Temples in Southern and Central Africa Temples in Nigeria Temples in Southeastern Nigeria Temples in Ghana Temple Icon Color = Operating = Under construction = Announced = Temporarily Closed	Ivory Coast	Abidjan Ivory Coast Temple	edit	Abidjan, Ivory Coast	May 25, 2025	17,362 sq ft 1,613.0 m^{2}
Temples in Africa Temples in Western Africa Temples in Southern and Central Africa Temples in Nigeria Temples in Southeastern Nigeria Temples in Ghana Temple Icon Color = Operating = Under construction = Announced = Temporarily Closed	Kenya	Nairobi Kenya Temple	edit	Nairobi, Kenya	May 18, 2025	19,870 sq ft 1,846 m^{2}
Temples in Africa Temples in Western Africa Temples in Southern and Central Africa Temples in Nigeria Temples in Southeastern Nigeria Temples in Ghana Temple Icon Color = Operating = Under construction = Announced = Temporarily Closed	Liberia	Monrovia Liberia	edit	Monrovia, Liberia	Announced; 3 October 2021	TBD
Temples in Africa Temples in Western Africa Temples in Southern and Central Africa Temples in Nigeria Temples in Southeastern Nigeria Temples in Ghana Temple Icon Color = Operating = Under construction = Announced = Temporarily Closed	Madagascar	Antananarivo Madagascar	edit	Antananarivo, Madagascar	Under construction	10,000 sq ft 930 m^{2}
Temples in Africa Temples in Western Africa Temples in Southern and Central Africa Temples in Nigeria Temples in Southeastern Nigeria Temples in Ghana Temple Icon Color = Operating = Under construction = Announced = Temporarily Closed	Mozambique	Beira Mozambique	edit	Beira, Mozambique	Site announced	10,000 sq ft 930 m^{2}
Temples in Africa Temples in Western Africa Temples in Southern and Central Africa Temples in Nigeria Temples in Southeastern Nigeria Temples in Ghana Temple Icon Color = Operating = Under construction = Announced = Temporarily Closed	Mozambique	Maputo Mozambique	edit	Maputo, Mozambique	Announced; 6 October 2024	TBD
Temples in Africa Temples in Western Africa Temples in Southern and Central Africa Temples in Nigeria Temples in Southeastern Nigeria Temples in Ghana Temple Icon Color = Operating = Under construction = Announced = Temporarily Closed	Nigeria	Aba Nigeria Temple	edit	Aba, Abia, Nigeria	August 7, 2005	11,500 sq ft 1,070 m^{2}
Temples in Africa Temples in Western Africa Temples in Southern and Central Africa Temples in Nigeria Temples in Southeastern Nigeria Temples in Ghana Temple Icon Color = Operating = Under construction = Announced = Temporarily Closed	Nigeria	Abuja Nigeria	edit	Abuja, Nigeria	Announced; 6 October 2024	TBD
Temples in Africa Temples in Western Africa Temples in Southern and Central Africa Temples in Nigeria Temples in Southeastern Nigeria Temples in Ghana Temple Icon Color = Operating = Under construction = Announced = Temporarily Closed	Nigeria	Calabar Nigeria	edit	Calabar, Nigeria	Site announced	26,000 sq ft 2,400 m^{2}
Temples in Africa Temples in Western Africa Temples in Southern and Central Africa Temples in Nigeria Temples in Southeastern Nigeria Temples in Ghana Temple Icon Color = Operating = Under construction = Announced = Temporarily Closed	Nigeria	Eket Nigeria	edit	Eket, Nigeria	Site announced	18,850 sq ft 1,751 m^{2}
Temples in Africa Temples in Western Africa Temples in Southern and Central Africa Temples in Nigeria Temples in Southeastern Nigeria Temples in Ghana Temple Icon Color = Operating = Under construction = Announced = Temporarily Closed	Nigeria	Benin City Nigeria	edit	Benin City, Nigeria	Under construction	30,700 sq ft 2,850 m^{2}
Temples in Africa Temples in Western Africa Temples in Southern and Central Africa Temples in Nigeria Temples in Southeastern Nigeria Temples in Ghana Temple Icon Color = Operating = Under construction = Announced = Temporarily Closed	Nigeria	Lagos Nigeria	edit	Ikoyi, Lagos, Nigeria	Under construction	19,800 sq ft 1,840 m^{2}
Temples in Africa Temples in Western Africa Temples in Southern and Central Africa Temples in Nigeria Temples in Southeastern Nigeria Temples in Ghana Temple Icon Color = Operating = Under construction = Announced = Temporarily Closed	Nigeria	Uyo Nigeria	edit	Uyo, Nigeria	Announced; 6 April 2025	TBD
Temples in Africa Temples in Western Africa Temples in Southern and Central Africa Temples in Nigeria Temples in Southeastern Nigeria Temples in Ghana Temple Icon Color = Operating = Under construction = Announced = Temporarily Closed	the Republic of the Congo	Brazzaville ROC	edit	Brazzaville, Republic of the Congo	Under construction	10,000 sq ft 930 m^{2}
Temples in Africa Temples in Western Africa Temples in Southern and Central Africa Temples in Nigeria Temples in Southeastern Nigeria Temples in Ghana Temple Icon Color = Operating = Under construction = Announced = Temporarily Closed	Sierra Leone	Freetown Sierra Leone	edit	Freetown, Sierra Leone	Under construction	18,000 sq ft 1,700 m^{2}
Temples in Africa Temples in Western Africa Temples in Southern and Central Africa Temples in Nigeria Temples in Southeastern Nigeria Temples in Ghana Temple Icon Color = Operating = Under construction = Announced = Temporarily Closed	South Africa	Cape Town South Africa	edit	Cape Town, South Africa	Under construction	9,500 sq ft 880 m^{2}
Temples in Africa Temples in Western Africa Temples in Southern and Central Africa Temples in Nigeria Temples in Southeastern Nigeria Temples in Ghana Temple Icon Color = Operating = Under construction = Announced = Temporarily Closed	South Africa	Durban South Africa Temple	edit	Umhlanga, South Africa	February 16, 2020	19,860 sq ft 1,845 m^{2}
Temples in Africa Temples in Western Africa Temples in Southern and Central Africa Temples in Nigeria Temples in Southeastern Nigeria Temples in Ghana Temple Icon Color = Operating = Under construction = Announced = Temporarily Closed	South Africa	Johannesburg South Africa Temple	edit	Johannesburg, South Africa	August 24, 1985	19,184 sq ft 1,782.3 m^{2}
Temples in Africa Temples in Western Africa Temples in Southern and Central Africa Temples in Nigeria Temples in Southeastern Nigeria Temples in Ghana Temple Icon Color = Operating = Under construction = Announced = Temporarily Closed	Uganda	Kampala Uganda	edit	Kampala, Uganda	Announced; 6 October 2024	TBD
Temples in Africa Temples in Western Africa Temples in Southern and Central Africa Temples in Nigeria Temples in Southeastern Nigeria Temples in Ghana Temple Icon Color = Operating = Under construction = Announced = Temporarily Closed	Zimbabwe	Harare Zimbabwe Temple	edit	Harare, Zimbabwe	March 1, 2026	17,250 sq ft 1,603 m^{2}

== Asia ==
Maps	Country	Temple		Location	Dedication/Status	Floor area
Temples in Asia Temples in East Asia Temples in Southeast Asia Temple Icon Color = Operating = Under construction = Announced = Temporarily Closed	Cambodia	Phnom Penh Cambodia	edit	Phnom Penh, Cambodia	August 30, 2026	9,946 sq ft 924.0 m^{2}
Temples in Asia Temples in East Asia Temples in Southeast Asia Temple Icon Color = Operating = Under construction = Announced = Temporarily Closed	China	Shanghai People's Republic of China	edit	Shanghai, People's Republic of China	Announced; 5 April 2020	TBD
Temples in Asia Temples in East Asia Temples in Southeast Asia Temple Icon Color = Operating = Under construction = Announced = Temporarily Closed	Hong Kong	Hong Kong China Temple	edit	Kowloon Tong, Hong Kong, China	May 26, 1996	51,921 sq ft 4,823.6 m^{2}
Temples in Asia Temples in East Asia Temples in Southeast Asia Temple Icon Color = Operating = Under construction = Announced = Temporarily Closed	India	Bengaluru India	edit	Bengaluru, India	Under construction	38,670 sq ft 3,593 m^{2}
Temples in Asia Temples in East Asia Temples in Southeast Asia Temple Icon Color = Operating = Under construction = Announced = Temporarily Closed	Indonesia	Jakarta Indonesia	edit	Jakarta, Indonesia	Site announced	50,000 sq ft 4,600 m^{2}
Temples in Asia Temples in East Asia Temples in Southeast Asia Temple Icon Color = Operating = Under construction = Announced = Temporarily Closed	Japan	Fukuoka Japan Temple	edit	Fukuoka, Japan	June 11, 2000	10,700 sq ft 990 m^{2}
Temples in Asia Temples in East Asia Temples in Southeast Asia Temple Icon Color = Operating = Under construction = Announced = Temporarily Closed	Japan	Okinawa Japan Temple	edit	Okinawa, Japan	Temporarily closed	12,437 sq ft 1,155.4 m^{2}
Temples in Asia Temples in East Asia Temples in Southeast Asia Temple Icon Color = Operating = Under construction = Announced = Temporarily Closed	Japan	Osaka Japan	edit	Hirakata, Japan	Site announced	34,320 sq ft 3,188 m^{2}
Temples in Asia Temples in East Asia Temples in Southeast Asia Temple Icon Color = Operating = Under construction = Announced = Temporarily Closed	Japan	Sapporo Japan Temple	edit	Sapporo, Japan	August 21, 2016	48,480 sq ft 4,504 m^{2}
Temples in Asia Temples in East Asia Temples in Southeast Asia Temple Icon Color = Operating = Under construction = Announced = Temporarily Closed	Japan	Tokyo Japan Temple	edit	Tokyo, Japan	October 27, 1980	53,997 sq ft 5,016.5 m^{2}
Temples in Asia Temples in East Asia Temples in Southeast Asia Temple Icon Color = Operating = Under construction = Announced = Temporarily Closed	Mongolia	Ulaanbaatar Mongolia	edit	Ulaanbaatar, Mongolia	Site announced	18,850 sq ft 1,751 m^{2}
Temples in Asia Temples in East Asia Temples in Southeast Asia Temple Icon Color = Operating = Under construction = Announced = Temporarily Closed	Singapore	Singapore	edit	Singapore	Under construction	18,000 sq ft 1,700 m^{2}
Temples in Asia Temples in East Asia Temples in Southeast Asia Temple Icon Color = Operating = Under construction = Announced = Temporarily Closed	South Korea	Busan Korea	edit	Busan, Korea	Announced; 2 October 2022	TBD
Temples in Asia Temples in East Asia Temples in Southeast Asia Temple Icon Color = Operating = Under construction = Announced = Temporarily Closed	South Korea	Seoul Korea Temple	edit	Seoul, South Korea	December 14, 1985	28,057 sq ft 2,606.6 m^{2}
Temples in Asia Temples in East Asia Temples in Southeast Asia Temple Icon Color = Operating = Under construction = Announced = Temporarily Closed	Taiwan	Kaohsiung Taiwan	edit	Kaohsiung, Taiwan	Under construction	10,900 sq ft 1,010 m^{2}
Temples in Asia Temples in East Asia Temples in Southeast Asia Temple Icon Color = Operating = Under construction = Announced = Temporarily Closed	Taiwan	Taipei Taiwan Temple	edit	Taipei, Taiwan	November 17, 1984	9,945 sq ft 923.9 m^{2}
Temples in Asia Temples in East Asia Temples in Southeast Asia Temple Icon Color = Operating = Under construction = Announced = Temporarily Closed	Thailand	Bangkok Thailand Temple	edit	Bangkok, Thailand	October 22, 2023	48,525 sq ft 4,508.1 m^{2}
Temples in Asia Temples in East Asia Temples in Southeast Asia Temple Icon Color = Operating = Under construction = Announced = Temporarily Closed	United Arab Emirates	Dubai United Arab Emirates	edit	Dubai, United Arab Emirates	Announced; 5 April 2020	TBD

=== Philippines ===
Maps	Temple		Location	Dedication/Status	Floor area
Temples in the Philippines Temples in Luzon Region Temples in Visayas Region	Alabang Philippines Temple	edit	Muntinlupa, Philippines	January 18, 2026	35,998 sq ft 3,344.3 m^{2}
Temples in the Philippines Temples in Luzon Region Temples in Visayas Region	Bacolod Philippines Temple	edit	Bacolod, Philippines	May 31, 2026	27,895 sq ft 2,591.5 m^{2}
Temples in the Philippines Temples in Luzon Region Temples in Visayas Region	Cagayan de Oro Philippines	edit	Cagayan de Oro, Misamis Oriental, Philippines	Under construction	18,449 sq ft 1,714.0 m^{2}
Temples in the Philippines Temples in Luzon Region Temples in Visayas Region	Cebu City Philippines Temple	edit	Cebu City, Philippines	June 13, 2010	29,556 sq ft 2,745.8 m^{2}
Temples in the Philippines Temples in Luzon Region Temples in Visayas Region	Davao Philippines Temple	edit	Davao, Philippines	May 3, 2026	18,450 sq ft 1,714 m^{2}
Temples in the Philippines Temples in Luzon Region Temples in Visayas Region	Iloilo Philippines	edit	Iloilo, Philippines	Site announced	18,850 sq ft 1,751 m^{2}
Temples in the Philippines Temples in Luzon Region Temples in Visayas Region	Laoag Philippines	edit	Laoag, Philippines	Announced; 1 October 2023	TBD
Temples in the Philippines Temples in Luzon Region Temples in Visayas Region	Manila Philippines Temple	edit	Quezon City, Philippines	September 25, 1984	26,683 sq ft 2,478.9 m^{2}
Temples in the Philippines Temples in Luzon Region Temples in Visayas Region	Naga Philippines	edit	Naga, Camarines Sur, Philippines	Under construction	18,850 sq ft 1,751 m^{2}
Temples in the Philippines Temples in Luzon Region Temples in Visayas Region	Santiago Philippines	edit	Santiago City, Philippines	Site announced	18,850 sq ft 1,751 m^{2}
Temples in the Philippines Temples in Luzon Region Temples in Visayas Region	San Jose del Monte Philippines	edit	San Jose del Monte, Philippines	Announced; 6 April 2025	TBD
Temples in the Philippines Temples in Luzon Region Temples in Visayas Region	Tacloban City Philippines	edit	Tacloban City, Philippines	Under construction	21,407 sq ft 1,988.8 m^{2}
Temples in the Philippines Temples in Luzon Region Temples in Visayas Region	Tuguegarao City Philippines	edit	Tuguegarao City, Philippines	Site announced	18,850 sq ft 1,751 m^{2}
Temples in the Philippines Temples in Luzon Region Temples in Visayas Region	Urdaneta Philippines Temple	edit	Urdaneta, Philippines	April 28, 2024	32,604 sq ft 3,029.0 m^{2}

== Oceania ==
Maps	Country	Temple		Location	Dedication/Status	Floor area
Temples in Oceania Temples in Australia Temples in New Zealand Temples in the Samoan Islands Temple Icon Color = Operating = Under construction = Announced = Temporarily Closed	American Samoa	Pago Pago American Samoa	edit	Tafuna, American Samoa	Dedication scheduled for 13 December 2026	17,000 sq ft 1,600 m^{2}
Temples in Oceania Temples in Australia Temples in New Zealand Temples in the Samoan Islands Temple Icon Color = Operating = Under construction = Announced = Temporarily Closed	Australia	Adelaide Australia Temple	edit	Marden, South Australia, Australia	June 15, 2000	10,700 sq ft 990 m^{2}
Temples in Oceania Temples in Australia Temples in New Zealand Temples in the Samoan Islands Temple Icon Color = Operating = Under construction = Announced = Temporarily Closed	Australia	Brisbane Australia Temple	edit	Kangaroo Point, Queensland, Australia	June 15, 2003	10,700 sq ft 990 m^{2}
Temples in Oceania Temples in Australia Temples in New Zealand Temples in the Samoan Islands Temple Icon Color = Operating = Under construction = Announced = Temporarily Closed	Australia	Brisbane Australia South	edit	Brisbane, Australia	Announced; 7 April 2024	TBD
Temples in Oceania Temples in Australia Temples in New Zealand Temples in the Samoan Islands Temple Icon Color = Operating = Under construction = Announced = Temporarily Closed	Australia	Liverpool Australia	edit	Liverpool, Australia	Announced; 6 April 2025	TBD
Temples in Oceania Temples in Australia Temples in New Zealand Temples in the Samoan Islands Temple Icon Color = Operating = Under construction = Announced = Temporarily Closed	Australia	Melbourne Australia Temple	edit	Wantirna South, Victoria, Australia	June 16, 2000	10,700 sq ft 990 m^{2}
Temples in Oceania Temples in Australia Temples in New Zealand Temples in the Samoan Islands Temple Icon Color = Operating = Under construction = Announced = Temporarily Closed	Australia	Perth Australia Temple	edit	Yokine, Western Australia, Australia	May 20, 2001	10,700 sq ft 990 m^{2}
Temples in Oceania Temples in Australia Temples in New Zealand Temples in the Samoan Islands Temple Icon Color = Operating = Under construction = Announced = Temporarily Closed	Australia	Sydney Australia Temple	edit	Carlingford, New South Wales, Australia	September 20, 1984	30,677 sq ft 2,850.0 m^{2}
Temples in Oceania Temples in Australia Temples in New Zealand Temples in the Samoan Islands Temple Icon Color = Operating = Under construction = Announced = Temporarily Closed	Fiji	Suva Fiji Temple	edit	Suva, Fiji	June 18, 2000	12,755 sq ft 1,185.0 m^{2}
Temples in Oceania Temples in Australia Temples in New Zealand Temples in the Samoan Islands Temple Icon Color = Operating = Under construction = Announced = Temporarily Closed	French Polynesia	Papeete Tahiti Temple	edit	Papeete, Tahiti, French Polynesia	October 27, 1983	12,150 sq ft 1,129 m^{2}
Temples in Oceania Temples in Australia Temples in New Zealand Temples in the Samoan Islands Temple Icon Color = Operating = Under construction = Announced = Temporarily Closed	French Polynesia	Uturoa French Polynesia	edit	Uturoa, French Polynesia	Announced; 7 April 2024	TBD
Temples in Oceania Temples in Australia Temples in New Zealand Temples in the Samoan Islands Temple Icon Color = Operating = Under construction = Announced = Temporarily Closed	Guam	Yigo Guam Temple	edit	Yigo, Guam	May 22, 2022	6,861 sq ft 637.4 m^{2}
Temples in Oceania Temples in Australia Temples in New Zealand Temples in the Samoan Islands Temple Icon Color = Operating = Under construction = Announced = Temporarily Closed	Kiribati	Tarawa Kiribati	edit	South Tarawa, Kiribati	Under construction	10,000 sq ft 930 m^{2}
Temples in Oceania Temples in Australia Temples in New Zealand Temples in the Samoan Islands Temple Icon Color = Operating = Under construction = Announced = Temporarily Closed	New Caledonia	Nouméa New Caledonia	edit	Nouméa, New Caledonia	Announced; 6 April 2025	TBD
Temples in Oceania Temples in Australia Temples in New Zealand Temples in the Samoan Islands Temple Icon Color = Operating = Under construction = Announced = Temporarily Closed	New Zealand	Auckland New Zealand Temple	edit	Auckland, New Zealand	April 13, 2025	45,456 sq ft 4,223.0 m^{2}
Temples in Oceania Temples in Australia Temples in New Zealand Temples in the Samoan Islands Temple Icon Color = Operating = Under construction = Announced = Temporarily Closed	New Zealand	Hamilton New Zealand Temple	edit	Hamilton, New Zealand	April 20, 1958	45,251 sq ft 4,204.0 m^{2}
Temples in Oceania Temples in Australia Temples in New Zealand Temples in the Samoan Islands Temple Icon Color = Operating = Under construction = Announced = Temporarily Closed	New Zealand	Wellington New Zealand	edit	Porirua, New Zealand	Under construction	14,900 sq ft 1,380 m^{2}
Temples in Oceania Temples in Australia Temples in New Zealand Temples in the Samoan Islands Temple Icon Color = Operating = Under construction = Announced = Temporarily Closed	Papua New Guinea	Port Moresby Papua New Guinea	edit	Port Moresby, Papua New Guinea	Under construction	9,550 sq ft 887 m^{2}
Temples in Oceania Temples in Australia Temples in New Zealand Temples in the Samoan Islands Temple Icon Color = Operating = Under construction = Announced = Temporarily Closed	Samoa	Apia Samoa Temple	edit	Apia, Samoa	August 5, 1983	18,691 sq ft 1,736.5 m^{2}
Temples in Oceania Temples in Australia Temples in New Zealand Temples in the Samoan Islands Temple Icon Color = Operating = Under construction = Announced = Temporarily Closed	Samoa	Apia Samoa Temple (original)	edit	Apia, Samoa	Destroyed	14,560 sq ft 1,353 m^{2}
Temples in Oceania Temples in Australia Temples in New Zealand Temples in the Samoan Islands Temple Icon Color = Operating = Under construction = Announced = Temporarily Closed	Samoa	Savai'i Samoa	edit	Salelologa, Samoa	Site announced	29,630 sq ft 2,753 m^{2}
Temples in Oceania Temples in Australia Temples in New Zealand Temples in the Samoan Islands Temple Icon Color = Operating = Under construction = Announced = Temporarily Closed	Tonga	Neiafu Tonga	edit	Neiafu, Tonga	Under construction	17,000 sq ft 1,600 m^{2}
Temples in Oceania Temples in Australia Temples in New Zealand Temples in the Samoan Islands Temple Icon Color = Operating = Under construction = Announced = Temporarily Closed	Tonga	Nuku'alofa Tonga Temple	edit	Nukuʻalofa, Tonga	August 9, 1983	21,184 sq ft 1,968.1 m^{2}
Temples in Oceania Temples in Australia Temples in New Zealand Temples in the Samoan Islands Temple Icon Color = Operating = Under construction = Announced = Temporarily Closed	Vanuatu	Port Vila Vanuatu	edit	Port Vila, Vanuatu	Under construction	10,000 sq ft 930 m^{2}

== See also ==
- List of temples in the United States (LDS Church)
- List of temples (LDS Church)
- Comparison of temples (LDS Church)
- Temple architecture (LDS Church)
