= The Church of Jesus Christ of Latter-day Saints in the Marshall Islands =

- Area: Pacific
- Members: 6,927 (2025)
- Stakes: 2
- Wards: 12
- Branches: 1
- Total congregations: 13
- Missions: 1
- FamilySearch Centers: 3

The Church of Jesus Christ of Latter-day Saints in the Marshall Islands refers to the Church of Jesus Christ of Latter-day Saints (LDS Church) and its members in the Marshall Islands. As of 2025, there were 6,927 members in 13 congregations, making it the second largest body of LDS Church members in Micronesia, behind Kiribati. The Marshall Islands has the second most LDS Church members per capita in Micronesia, and the fourth most members per capita of any independent country in the world, behind Tonga, Samoa, and Kiribati.

== First missionaries, convert, and congregation ==
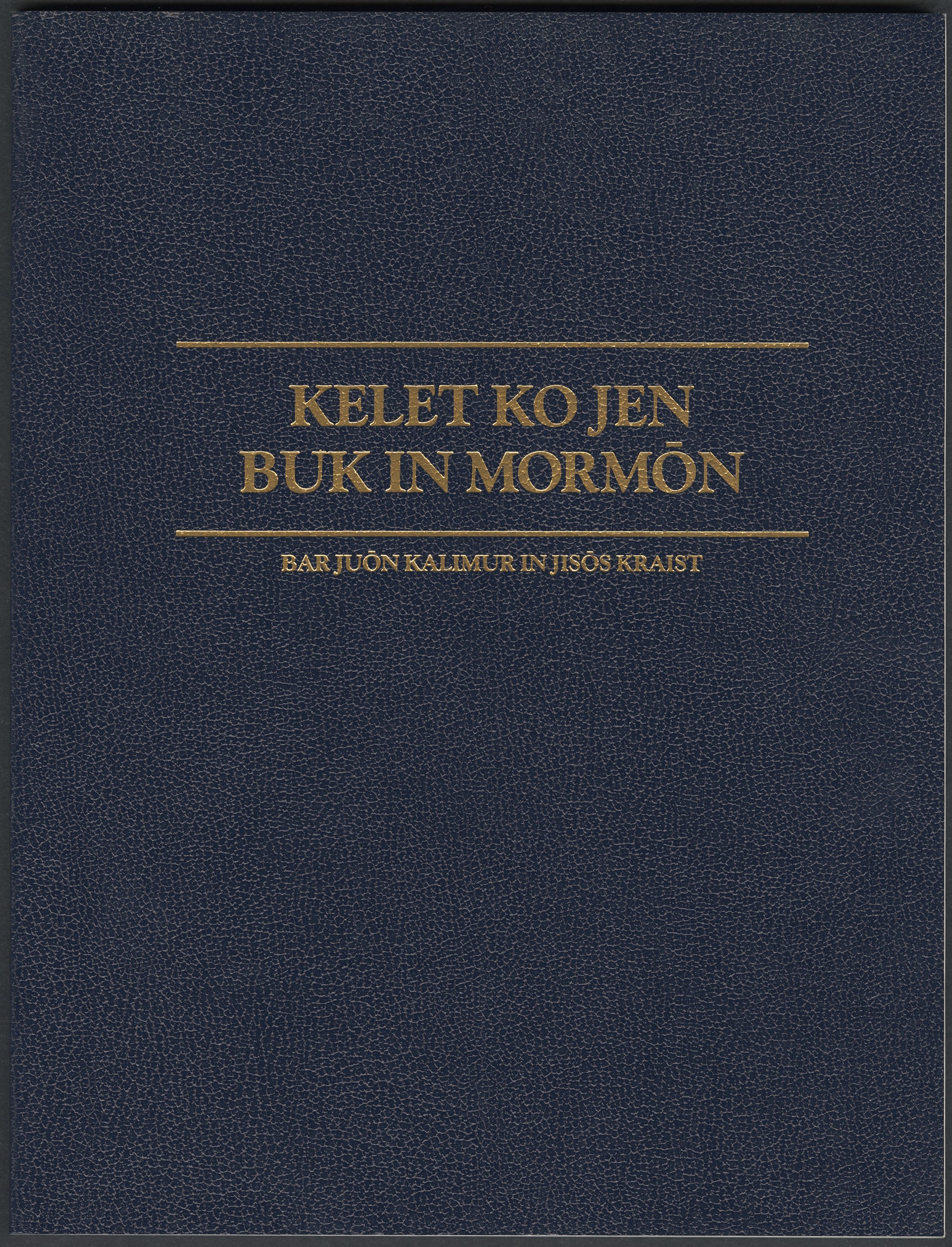
The Book of Mormon in Marshallese

The first Mormon missionaries in the Marshall Islands were William Wardel and Steven Cooper, who arrived on 3 February 1977. Misao Lokeijak was the first person in the Marshall Islands to become a member of the LDS Church. Lokeijak was baptized in 1977, shortly after Mormon missionaries first arrived in Majuro. Lokeijak had previously been introduced to Mormonism in Hawaii.

On 11 May 1978, the Laura Branch of the church was created and Lokeijak was made the first branch president in the Marshall Islands.

== Church growth ==
Membership in the Marshall Islands
Year	Membership
1979	177
1989*	1,300
1999	3,369
2009	4,725
2019	6,976
2025	6,927
*Membership was published as a rounded number. Source: Windall J. Ashton; Jim M. Wall, Deseret News, various years, Church Almanac Country Information: Marshall Islands

At the end of 1977, there were 27 members of the LDS Church in the Marshall Islands. By the end of 1979, there were 177. In 1984, there were enough members to justify the construction of two meetinghouses, one in Laura and one in Rita. The meetinghouse in Laura was dedicated on 13 January 1986 and the one in Rita on 14 January. In 1987, the Majuro District (of the Micronesia Guam Mission) was organized with five constituent branches. By 1990, there were over 1000 members of the church in the Marshall Islands. The Marshall Islands Majuro Mission was created in 2006 and the first stake was established in Majuro in June 2009.

== Stakes and Congregations ==
As of September 2026, the Marshall Islands included the following Stakes and Congregations:

Kwajalein Marshall Islands Stake

- Ebeye 1st Ward
- Ebeye 2nd Ward
- Ebeye 3rd Ward
- Kwajalein Ward
- Lae Ward

Majuro Marshall Islands Stake

- Ajeltake Ward
- Delap Ward
- Jenrok Ward
- Laura Ward
- Long Island Majuro Ward
- Rita Ward
- Uliga Ward

In addition to the congregations in these two stakes, the Marshall Islands/Kiribati Mission Branch serves individuals and families not in proximity of a meetinghouse.

== Missions ==
The Marshall Islands/Kiribati Mission includes the entirety of the Marshall Islands as well as Kiribati and Nauru.

== Temples ==
The Marshall Islands is currently located in the Suva Fiji Temple District. Construction on the Yigo Guam Temple started on May 4, 2019, and on October 4, 2020 the Tarawa Kiribati Temple was announced by Church President Russell M. Nelson bringing the nearest location of a temple closer.

== See also ==
- The Church of Jesus Christ of Latter-day Saints membership statistics
- Religion in the Marshall Islands
