= The Church of Jesus Christ of Latter-day Saints in Vanuatu =

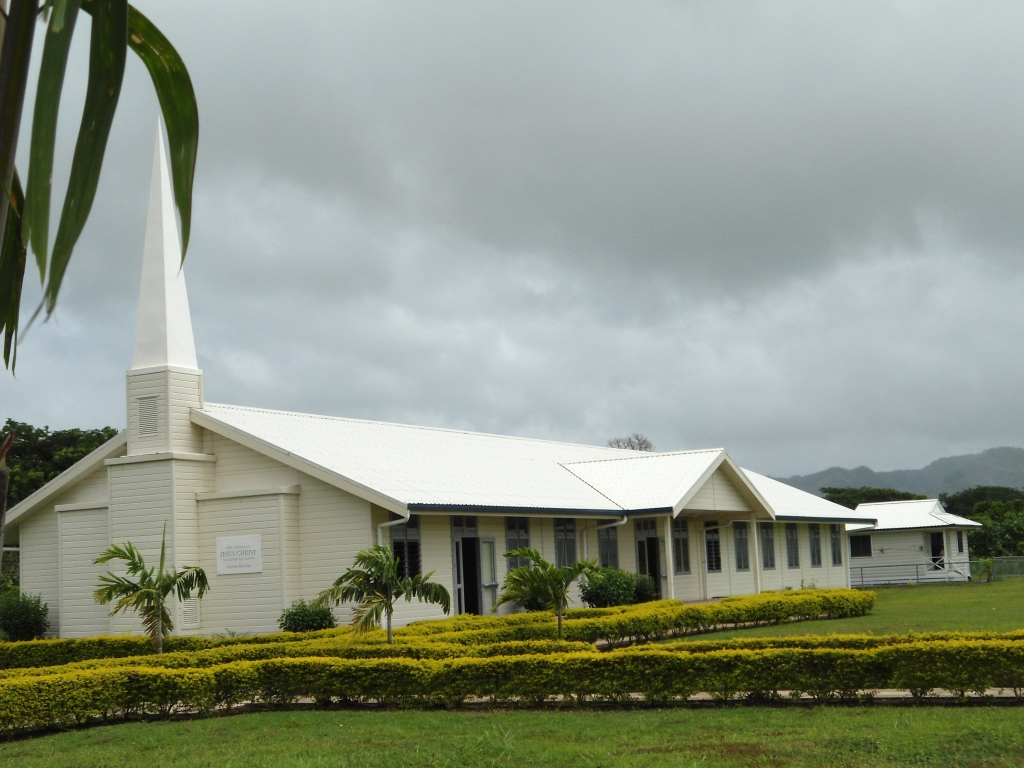
- An LDS Church meetinghouse in Vanuatu.
- Area: Pacific
- Members: 14,042 (2025)
- Stakes: 2
- Districts: 2
- Wards: 11
- Branches: 32
- Total Congregations: 43
- Missions: 1
- Temples: 1 under construction
- FamilySearch Centers: 3

The Church of Jesus Christ of Latter-day Saints in Vanuatu refers to the Church of Jesus Christ of Latter-day Saints (LDS Church) and its members in Vanuatu. As of year-end 2025, there were 14,042 members in 43 congregations, making it the third largest body of LDS Church members in Melanesia behind Papua New Guinea and Fiji. Vanuatu has the most LDS Church members per capita in Melanesia.

== History ==
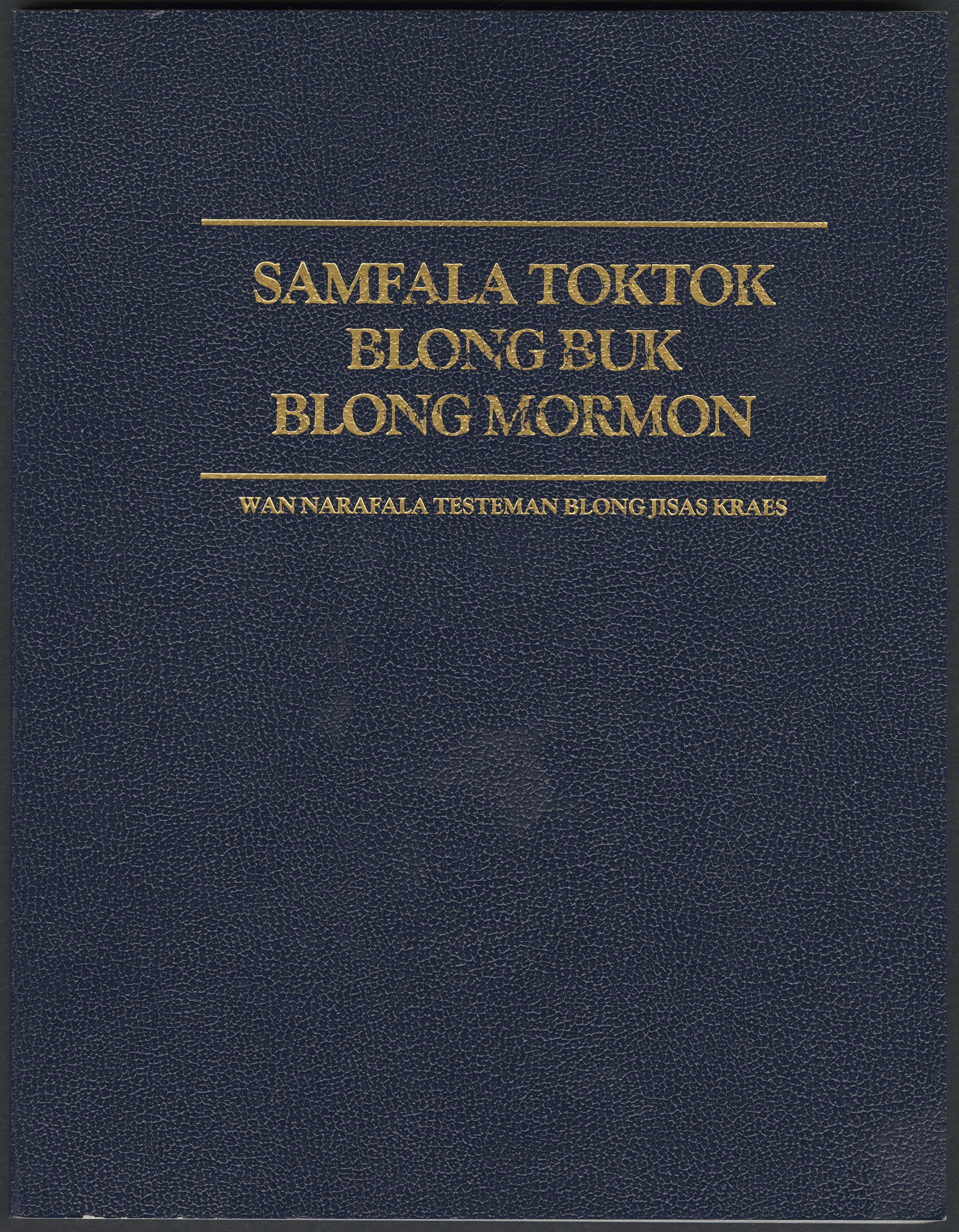
Bislama translation of the Book of Mormon

Membership in Vanuatu
Year	Membership
1978	83
1984	120
1989*	200
1995*	500
1999	1,121
2004	2,822
2009	3,783
2014	6,693
2019	10,210
2024	12,820
2025	14,042
*Membership was published as a rounded number.

Tongan members moved to New Hebrides (now Vanuatu) in the early 1970s. A branch was formed in Port Vila on July 15, 1973. Additional congregations emerged and the Port Vila District was created October 19, 1996. The Luganville District was organized September 27, 1998. The Port Vila Vanuatu Stake was created on Sunday June 21, 2015 with 2,000 in attendance.

== Stake & Districts ==
As of May 2025, the following stake and districts exist in Vanuatu:

Stake/District	Organized
Luganville Vanuatu District	27 Sep 1998
Malekula Vanuatu District	29 May 2011
Port Vila Vanuatu Stake	22 Oct 1996
Tanna Vanuatu Stake	27 Apr 2014

== Mission ==
Missionaries from the Fiji Suva mission first arrived in Vanuatu in 1974. It continued to be part of the Fiji Suva Mission until 2012. In July 2012, the Fiji Suva and Papua New Guinea Port Moresby Missions were divided to create the Vanuatu Port Vila Mission which encompassed the islands of New Caledonia, Vanuatu, and The Solomon Islands. On July 1, 2026 the mission was realigned and consists of Vanuatu and New Calidonia after creation of the Solomon Islands Honiara Mission.

=== Solomon Islands ===
The first branch of the LDS Church in the Solomon Islands was organized February 4, 1996. Additional branches formed and the Honiara Solomon Islands District was organized on November 27, 2011. In 2025, the district included 3,232 members in ten branches. Congregations in the Solomon Islands as of June 2026 include:

- Auki Branch
- Burns Creek Branch
- Fauabu Malaita Branch
- Honiara Branch
- Kola'a Ridge Branch (Honiara)
- Naha Branch (Honiara)
- Namoruka Branch (Honiara)
- Papaho Branch (Honiara)
- Point Cruz Branch (Honiara)
- Ulawa Branch
- White River Branch (Honiara).

On July 1, 2026, the Solomon Islands Honiara Mission was created.

== Temples ==
On October 4, 2020 the Port Vila Vanuatu Temple was announced by church president Russell M. Nelson. Groundbreaking took place on April 8, 2023.

240. Port Vila Vanuatu Temple (Under construction); Official website; News & images	
Location: Announced: Groundbreaking: Size:	Port Vila, Vanuatu; 4 October 2020 by Russell M. Nelson; 8 April 2023 by K. Brett Nattress; 10,000 sq ft (930 m^{2}) on a 1.62-acre (0.66 ha) site

== See also ==
- Religion in Vanuatu
