= The Church of Jesus Christ of Latter-day Saints in New Caledonia =

Overview of the LDS church on the New Caledonian territory

- Members: 2,531 (2024)
- Stakes: 1
- Wards: 6
- Branches: 3
- Total Congregations: 9
- FamilySearch Centers: 3

The Church of Jesus Christ of Latter-day Saints in New Caledonia refers to the Church of Jesus Christ of Latter-day Saints (LDS Church) and its members in New Caledonia. At year-end 1983, there were about 100 members in New Caledonia. In 2024, there were 2,531 members in 9 congregations.

== History ==
Membership in New Caledonia
Year	Membership
1969	130
1971	233
1983	418
1989*	700
1995*	1,100
1999	1,449
2004	1,677
2009	1,890
2014	2,244
2019	2,500
2024	2,531
*Membership was published as a rounded number. Source: Windall J. Ashton; Jim M. Wall, Deseret News, various years, Church Almanac Country Information: New Caledonia

Some Servicemen passed through Tahiti during World War II. Beginning in the late 1950s church members, primarily from Tahiti, would come to New Caledonia to find work. Initially informal meetings were held. In October 1961, the mission president of the French Polynesian Mission, Kendall Young, traveled to Noumea to organize a branch. On Oct. 21, 1961 the Noumea Branch organized with Teahumanu Manoi called as president.

Through the 1960s, Tahitian was the primary language spoken by most members and was the language used in church services and literature. Without recognition, there were no missionaries sent by the church and the church couldn't buy land or build a meetinghouse. Members would meet in different theaters and a Chinese restaurant. On May 2, 1968, then Elder Thomas S. Monson stood on Mount Coffyn which overlooked the city of Noumea and the ocean and dedicated the land for the preaching of the gospel. In July 1968, the church received official recognition and was permitted to send the first two missionaries to the islands. On July 15, 1968 the first missionaries, a married couple arrived. On November 16, 1968, the first baptism in New Caledonia was Etienne Sun, then 13 and church service attendance was nearing 60. Younger missionaries first arrived on Jan. 20, 1969 and on Dec. 24, 1972, the Noumea Branch meetinghouse was dedicated.

In May 1976, the Noumea branch was divided (Tahitian and French language branches) and the meetinghouse was enlarged. In 1977, the District of New Caledonia. District includes the two branches of Noumea, and the branch of Tontouta. On March 3, 1973, Ricardo and Anita Gaya traveled to Hamilton New Zealand and were the first members from New Caledonia to be sealed in the temple. Seminary began in the 1970s and institute began in the 1980s. In the 1990s the number of missionaries in New Caledonia averages 10 companionships. President Gordon B. Hinckley visited New Caledonia on June 17, 2000 with 1,000 attending the conference.

On May 27, 2012, the Noumea New Caledonia Stake was organized with Georgie Guidi as President. On February 21, 2014, Elder Neil L. Andersen Visited New Caledonia. From June 2020 to July 2021, there were no full time missionaries in New Caledonia due to the COVID-19 Pandemic.

== Stake and Congregations ==
LDS Church Locations as of May 2025
Green = Stake Center and meetinghouse
Purple = meetinghouse
(FHC) = Family History Center

As of May 2025, the following congregations met in New Caledonia:

Noumea New Caledonia Stake

- Ducos Ward
- Dumbéa Ward
- Magenta Ward
- Mont-Dore Ward
- Rivière-Salée Ward
- Tontouta Ward
- Bourail Branch
- Lifou Branch
- Mare Branch

== Missions ==
In June 1975, the New Caledonia and the Noumea Branch were transferred to the Fiji Suva Mission. On July 1, 2012, the Vanuatu Port Vila Mission which encompasses New Caledonia, Vanuatu, and The Solomon Islands was organized.

== Temples ==
As of February 2023, New Caledonia was located in the Hamilton New Zealand Temple District. It is anticipated it will be located in the Port Vila Vanuatu Temple District once it's completed. On April 6, 2025, church president Russell M Nelson announced the Nouméa New Caledonia Temple.

375. Nouméa New Caledonia Temple (Announced); Official website; News & images	
Location: Announced:	Nouméa, New Caledonia; 6 April 2025 by Russell M. Nelson

== See also ==
- The Church of Jesus Christ of Latter-day Saints membership statistics
- The Church of Jesus Christ of Latter-day Saints in France
- Religion in New Caledonia
