= The Church of Jesus Christ of Latter-day Saints in Fiji =

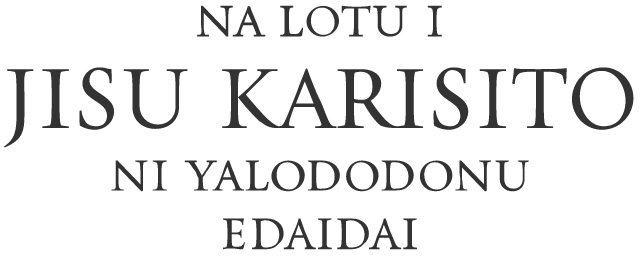
- (Logo in Fijian)

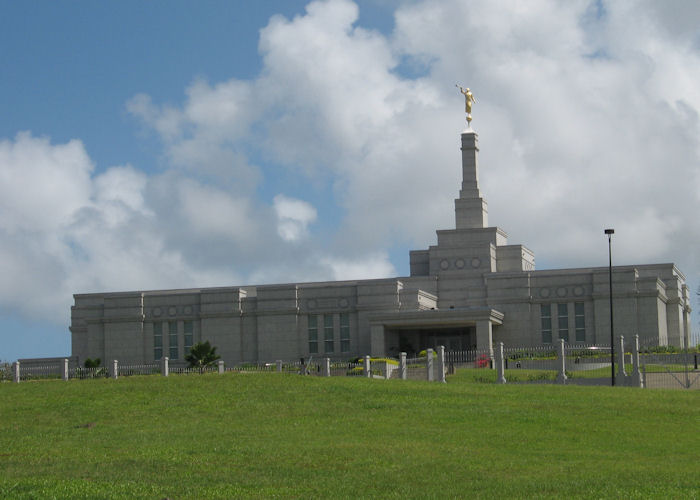
- The Suva Fiji Temple
- Area: Pacific
- Members: 24,847 (2025)
- Stakes: 4
- Districts: 1
- Wards: 26
- Branches: 26
- Total Congregations: 52
- Missions: 1
- Temples: 1 operating
- FamilySearch Centers: 11

The Church of Jesus Christ of Latter-day Saints in Fiji refers to the Church of Jesus Christ of Latter-day Saints (LDS Church) and its members in Fiji. The first branch (small congregation) was formed in 1955 and membership has grown to the point there are now 52 congregations in Fiji. As of December 31, 2025, the Church reported there were 24,847 members in Fiji. making it the second largest body of LDS Church members in Melanesia behind Papua New Guinea.

== History ==
Membership in Fiji
Year	Membership
1973	1,500
1980	4,117
1989*	6,700
1999	11,998
2009	15,242
2019	22,154
2025	24,847
*Membership was published as a rounded number.

LDS Church leaders, apostle David O. McKay and Hugh J. Cannon, visited the Fiji Islands in 1921 and did not feel impressed at that time to introduce the church to these islands. The first known member to live in Fiji was Mary Ashley, who moved to Suva from Tonga in 1924. The first regular missionary visits to Fiji began in 1953, with the first permanently assigned missionaries arriving the next year. On 23 January 1954, Ashley's eleven-year-old daughter, Margaret, was baptized at Laucala Beach Estate. This was the church's first baptism performed and recorded in Fiji. The church's first recorded meeting was held on 25 July 1954, in the Matanisiga Hall in Toorak, Suva.

Fijian men were initially restricted from being ordained in the priesthood but this practice changed in 1955, when the church reasoned that Fijians were Melanesian in origin and therefore eligible for ordination. After visiting the island in 1955, McKay, who was then serving as church president, opened the first branch in Fiji and called on missionaries to increase outreach to local Fijians and Indians.

Membership growth began in earnest as the church focused resources and efforts on the Fiji islanders. Gideon Dolo was the first Fijian to serve a mission, leaving in February 1959. In 1969 LDS Primary School began meeting in the Suva Chapel and later moved to its permanent location in Samabula area. Fiji Primary In 1975, the church-owned Fiji Technical College, now called the Church College of Fiji was opened. The first stake in Fiji, the Suva Fiji Stake was organized 12 June 1983, with Inosi Naga as president. A stake was later created in Viti Levu, with districts created in Vanua Levu and Taveuni due to congregation and membership expansion. The number of congregations increased rapidly in the 1990s, from 19 to 41. The Suva Fiji Temple was dedicated on 18 June 2000. Congregation and membership growth continues to progress, with membership doubling over the past 25 years.

Fijian church membership has also shown development outside of Fiji. As of 2024, the LDS Church operates three Fijian-speaking congregations outside of Fiji – one in Orem, Utah and two located in California: the Sacramento 4th Ward and the San Francisco 2nd Branch.

== Stakes and Districts ==
As of August 2026, the following stakes and district exist in Fiji:

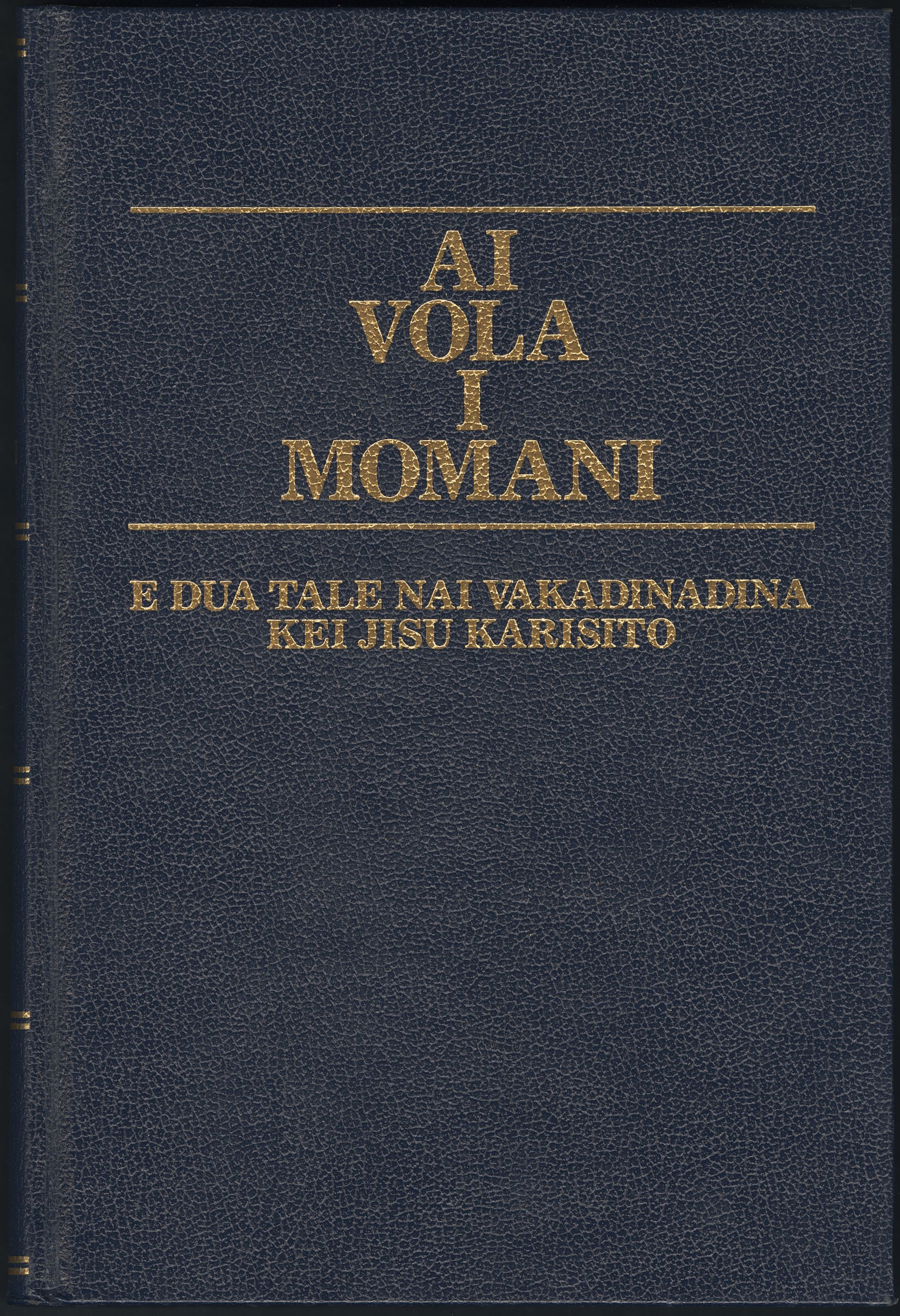
Fijian translation of the Book of Mormon

Stake/District	Organized
Lautoka Fiji Stake	11 Aug 1996
Nausori Fiji Stake	16 Apr 1995
Suva Fiji Stake	5 Jun 1983
Suva Fiji North Stake	15 Jun 1997
Vanua Levu Fiji District	4 Jun 2017

The Motusa Rotuma Branch and Fiji Suva Mission Branch are not part of a stake or district. The Fiji Suva Mission Branch serves families and individuals in Fiji, Wallis and Futuna, and Tuvalu that are not in proximity of a meetinghouse.

== Mission ==
Fiji Suva Mission was organized on July 23, 1971. As of 2023, it encompasses the nations of Fiji, Tuvalu, and Wallis and Futuna.

=== Tuvalu ===
In 2025, the LDS Church reported having 381 members with a branch in Funafuti. The Funafuti Branch was organized November 11, 1985.

== Temples ==
On June 18, 2000, the Suva Fiji Temple was dedicated by church president Gordon B. Hinckley.

91. Suva Fiji Temple; Official website; News & images	
Location: Announced: Groundbreaking: Dedicated: Rededicated: Size: Style:	Suva, Fiji; 7 May 1998 by Gordon B. Hinckley; 8 May 1999 by Earl M. Monson; 18 June 2000 by Gordon B. Hinckley; 21 February 2016 by Henry B. Eyring; 12,755 sq ft (1,185.0 m^{2}) on a 4.7-acre (1.9 ha) site Classic modern, single-spire design - designed by Conway Beg

== Prominent members ==
Bruce Ferguson was a professional rugby player for the Japanese National Team from 1993 to 1997.

Jone Logavatu Kalouniwai is a major general in the Republic of Fiji Military Forces (RFMF) who currently serves as the commander of the Republic of Fiji Military Forces since 16 September 2021.

Semi Radradra professional rugby player, Olympic gold medalist in 2020.

Ponepati Loganimasi professional rugby player, Olympic silver medalist in 2024.

Taniela B. Wakolo was sustained as an LDS Church general authority on April 1, 2017.

Taito Waradi is a Fijian business and government leader who has served as general manager of Telecom Fiji, as President of the Fiji Chamber of Commerce and Industry, and as the Government Minister for Commerce.

== See also ==
- Religion in Fiji: Latter Day Saints
