= The Church of Jesus Christ of Latter-day Saints in Kiribati =

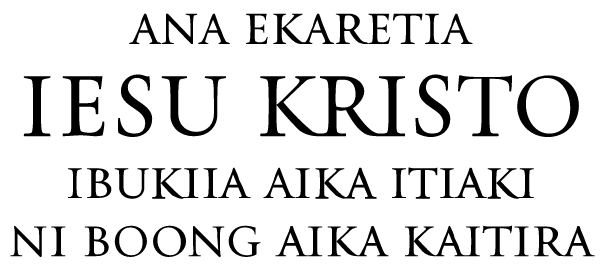
- (Logo in Gilbertese)
- Area: Pacific
- Census: 6,720 (2020)
- Members: 23,585 (2025)
- Stakes: 4
- Districts: 2
- Wards: 20
- Branches: 25
- Total Congregations: 45
- Temples: 1 under construction
- FamilySearch Centers: 3

The Church of Jesus Christ of Latter-day Saints in Kiribati refers to the Church of Jesus Christ of Latter-day Saints (LDS Church) and its members in Kiribati. In 1976 the first branch (small congregation) was organized in Tarawa. As at the 2020 Census, there were 6,720 people declaring as LDS members. According to LDS church, as of year-end 2025, there were 23,585 members in 45 congregations, making it the largest body of LDS Church members in Micronesia. Kiribati also has the most LDS Church members per capita in Micronesia, and the third most members per capita of any country in the world, behind Tonga and Samoa.

== History ==
Membership in Kiribati
Year	Membership
1985	620
1989*	1,300
1999	7,964
2009	15,475
2019	20,946
2025	23,585
*Membership was published as a rounded number.

In 1972, teacher Waitea Abiuta encouraged his students to attend Liahona High School in Tonga. Ebbie L. Davis, president of the Fiji Mission, recommended 12 students to be enrolled on a trial basis, with 12 more enrolled each subsequent year. By 1976, 60 students had been enrolled in Liahona High School. All but a few of these were baptized and were the first known church members from Kiribati. Six of these were called to the Fiji Suva Mission and assigned to their native Kiribati, arriving in Tarawa on October 19, 1975.

Waieta Abiuta, and several of the staff at his school, were amongst those who were baptized by these 6 missionaries. On January 24, 1976, the Tarawa Branch was organized, with Wieta Abiuta as branch president. In 1977, the church purchased the school and renamed it Moroni Community School. It later became known as Moroni High School. The Gilbert Islands became the independent Republic of Kiribati in 1979.

In 1984, the student body of Moroni Community School reached 240, with many of its teachers being graduates of BYU-Hawaii. In 1994, Teatao Teannaki, president of the Republic of Kiribati, was the main speaker at the graduation ceremonies at Moroni High School. In 1999, President Teburoro Tito also visited Moroni High School and spoke to students.

In 1981, Baitika Toum became the first of several church members to be elected to parliament. He went on to serve as a cabinet minister for 13 years.;The Tarawa Branch meetinghouse was completed in 1981, but meetings were not held in the meetinghouse until February 1982. In October 1985, the Tarawa District was organized and included the Alieu, Abaiang, and Eita branches. L. Tom Perry organized the Tarawa Kiribati Stake, with Atunibeia Mote sustained as president.

Seminary began on Kiribati in March 1997. On May 23, 1999, the Kiritimati Island Branch was created. On 26 January 2000, church president Gordon B. Hinckley, on a tour of Pacific Rim countries, visited members at Tarawa. On, June 19, 2003, Hinckley visited members on Kiritimati Island. On June 20, 2014, the Kiritimati Island Kiribati District was organized, with Naitinua Teitikai Tokinteiti as president, and included branches on Kiritimati and Tabuaeran. In January 2020, Ian S. Ardern, president of the church's Pacific Area, met with Taneti Maamau, President of the Republic of Kiribati. Maamau accepted an invitation from Ardern to attend the Tarawa East Stake conference the next Sunday where 1,200 were in attendance.

Selections of the Book of Mormon were translated into Gilbertese (Kiribati) in 1988. On September 28, 2017, the Church announced the publication of the Doctrine and Covenants and Pearl of Great Price in the Kiribati language.

In October 2014, church members in Tarawa Kiribati volunteered to help construct a seawall to protect the community from flooding. On February 7, 2018, a memorial service was held at Moroni High School to honor victims of the sinking of the MV Butiraoi. The service was attended by government officials, Church leaders, and the victims’ family members.

== Stakes & Districts ==
As of August 2026, the following Stakes and Districts were in Kiribati:

Stake/District	Organized
Kiritimati Island Kiribati District	20 Jun 2014
Southern Kiribati District	11 Jun 2019
Tarawa Kiribati Betio Stake	14 Sep 2025
Tarawa Kiribati East Stake	28 Jan 2007
Tarawa Kiribati North Stake	19 Oct 2025
Tarawa Kiribati West Stake	11 Aug 1996

Congregations in Kiribati not part of a stake or district

- Aranuka Branch
- Baretoa Branch
- Kuria Branch
- Maiana Branch
- Marshall Islands/Kiribati Mission Branch
- Rawannawi Branch

The Marshall Islands/Kiribati Mission Branch serves families not in proximity of a meetinghouse.

== Temples ==
As of May 2025, Kiribati was part of the Suva Fiji Temple district. The Tarawa Kiribati Temple was announced by church President Russell M. Nelson in the October 2020 General Conference.

252. Tarawa Kiribati Temple (Under construction); Official website; News & images	
Location: Announced: Groundbreaking: Size: Notes:	South Tarawa, Kiribati; 4 October 2020 by Russell M. Nelson; 2 November 2024 by Jeremy R. Jaggi; 10,000 sq ft (930 m^{2}) on a 0.8-acre (0.32 ha) site Renderings and floor area were released on May 19, 2021.

== See also ==
- Religion in Kiribati
