= The Church of Jesus Christ of Latter-day Saints in Mongolia =

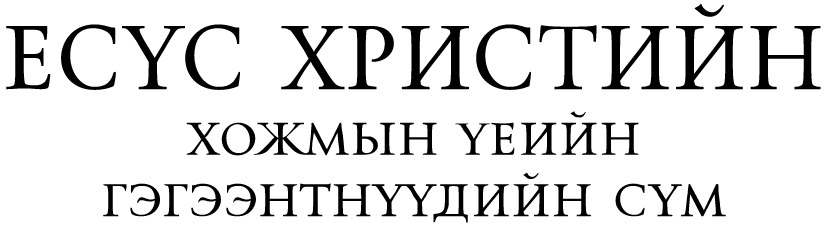
- (Logo in Mongolian)

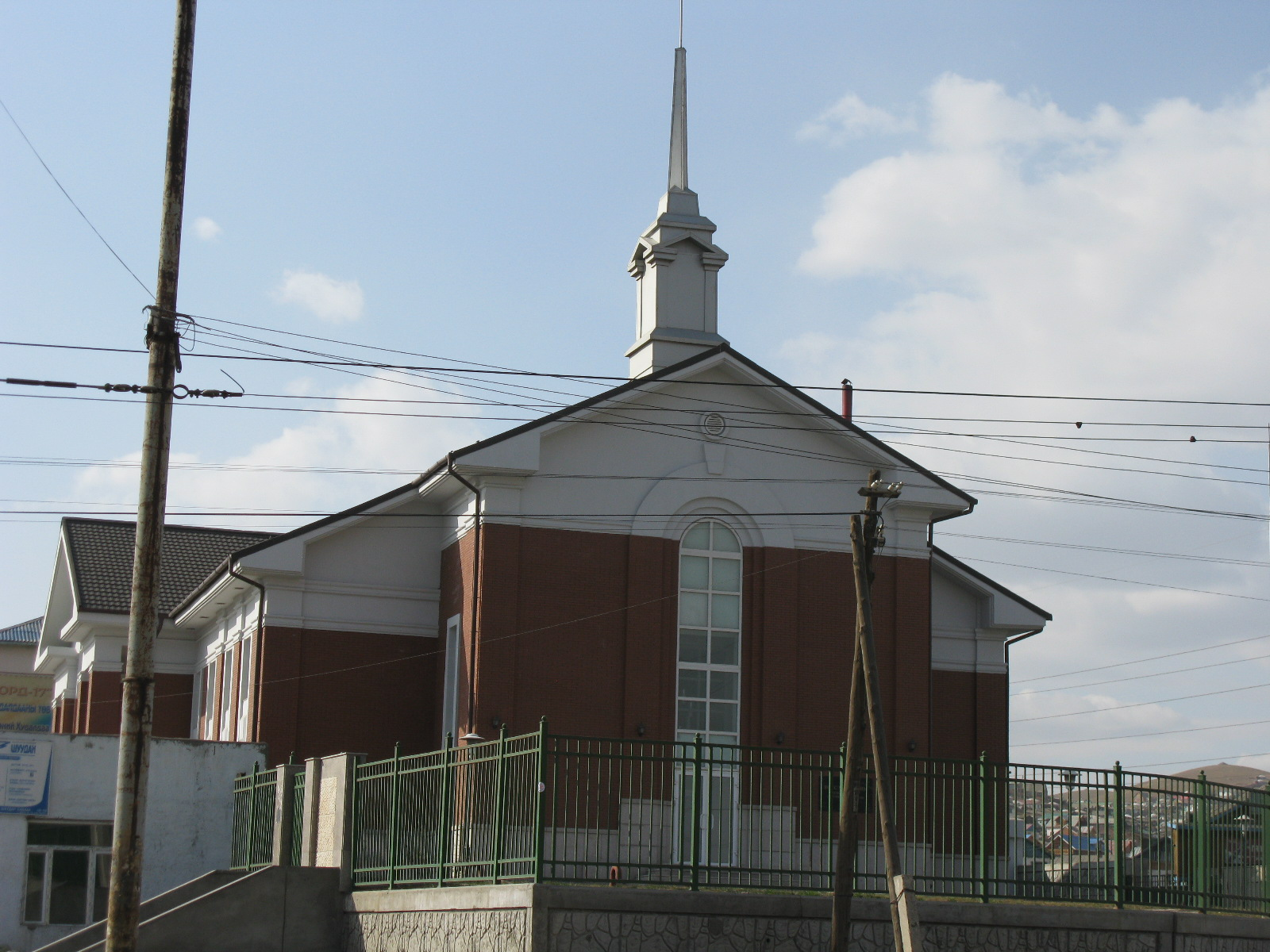
- A ward meetinghouse in Ulaanbaatar, Mongolia
- Area: Asia North
- Members: 13,250 (2025)
- Stakes: 2
- Districts: 1
- Wards: 12
- Branches: 12
- Total congregations: 24
- Missions: 1
- Temples: 1 announced
- FamilySearch Centers: 13

The Church of Jesus Christ of Latter-day Saints in Mongolia refers to the Church of Jesus Christ of Latter-day Saints (LDS Church) and its members in Mongolia. The first missionaries arrived in 1992 on a request of the Mongolian government in an effort to improve higher education in the country following the collapse of the Soviet Union. The first small branch was established in 1993. Since then, the LDS Church in Mongolia has grown to more than 13,000 members in 24 congregations. In 2022, Mongolia had the second most LDS Church members per capita in Asia behind the Philippines. In 2023 it was announced that the first temple will be constructed in Ulaanbaatar.

== History ==
Membership in Mongolia
Year	Members
1993*	100
1995*	400
1999	1,850
2004	6,346
2009	9,239
2014	11,028
2019	12,261
2024	12,624
2025	13,250
*Membership was published as a rounded number. Source: Windall J. Ashton; Jim M. Wall, Deseret News, various years, Church Almanac Country Information: Mongolia

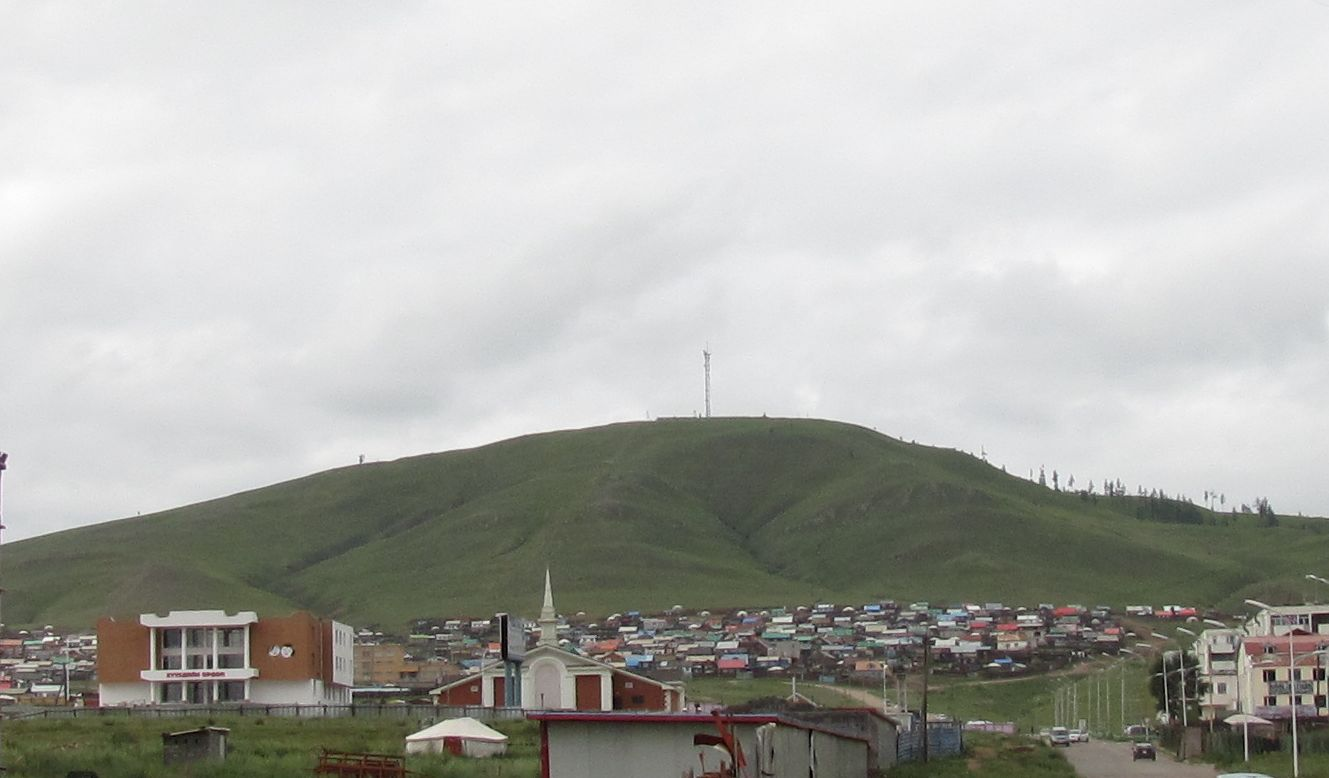
Residential area in the city of Erdenet, Mongolia. The building with a steeple is a meetinghouse of The Church of Jesus Christ of Latter-day Saints.

In May 1992, Elders Merlin Lybbert and Monte Brough, members of the Asia Area presidency, went to Mongolia to explore the possibility of the Church providing humanitarian aid. Under the request of Mongolian government, the church sent six missionary couples to improve the higher education system in Mongolia. These missionary couples included a former business college president, a medical doctor responsible for postgraduate studies at a university medical center, a computer science professor, a business professor, a professor of curriculum development and administration, and an educational administrator.

The first Mongolian converts were baptized in 1993 and the Ulaanbaatar Branch was organized in September of the same year. On July 1, 1995, the Mongolia Ulaanbaatar Mission was officially organized. On October 24, 1994, the church was officially registered with the Mongolian government. On April 11, 1995, the first native Mongolians received mission calls. Seminary and institute classes started in 1996. On September 15, 1996 the Ulaanbaatar Mongolia District was organized.

On June 6, 1999, the first LDS Church meetinghouse was dedicated. Previously, the building was widely known as "Children's Cinema". The first meetinghouse built by the LDS Church was built in Darkhan and was dedicated in June 2001. The Bayanzurkh Church Center, a five-story building that houses the mission home and office, service center, distribution center, meetinghouse, Stake offices for both the Ulaanbaatar Mongolia East and West stakes, and Church Educational System offices, started construction in the fall of 2000.

The Mongolian translation of the Book of Mormon became available starting in November 2001 with selections translated into Mongolian, and the most recent edition completed in 2008.

The Ulaanbaatar Mongolia West Stake with six congregations was formed in 2009 growing to nine congregations by May 2016. The Ulaanbaatar Mongolia East Stake was created in May 2016 with six congregations. About 2010 new visa laws went into effect limiting foreigners causing many of the foreign Church of Jesus Christ of Latter-day Saints missionaries to be reassigned to other countries. There were, however, about 110 Mongolian missionaries serving full time missions inside Mongolia. Some missionaries serving in Mongolia are from Mongolia. In May 2011, Elder Jeffery R. Holland visited Ulaanbaatar to meet with government officials, missionaries, and members of the Church. Elder David A. Bednar visited Mongolia in May 2018.

In July 2015 a choir of more than 50 members of the LDS Church in Mongolia toured communities throughout Northern Mongolia. They also provided humanitarian service in these communities during the tour. This was the first rural tour of the LDS Church in Mongolia. In 2016, “Zion” band, a youth choir of the LDS Church in Mongolia, successfully participated in "Mongolia's Got Talent Show.

On August 1, 2019 the LDS Church in Mongolia became part of the Asia North Area which covers Northern Asia and some North Pacific islands.

=== Humanitarian work ===
In addition to the missionaries sent to improve Mongolia's higher education, the Church has provided humanitarian support. In 1996, Church-sponsored humanitarian projects included the support of the Mongolian Scout Association, training of professional accountants, cold weather housing, teaching English, and relief for victims of grass fires. In the year 2000, after a severe dzud followed by a harsh drought, Mongolian government leaders requested international assistance. In response, the Church sent three shipping containers of clothing and quilts, in addition to 8,000 food boxes. The Church has provided medical equipment and supplies and training for hospitals and individuals, implemented several clean water projects, implemented programs to help people struggling with drug and alcohol addictions, job training, education, as well as several other humanitarian service projects. The Church continued to provide donations and other services during the COVID-19 pandemic.

== Stakes ==
Stake Centers in Mongolia
Green = Stake
Orange = District
Purple = meetinghouse not part of stake or district*
*Khovd Branch is part of Ulaanbaatar West Stake

As of September 2026, 2 stakes and a district existed in Mongolia:

Ulaanbaatar Mongolia East Stake

- American Denj Ward
- Baganuur Branch
- Bayanzurkh Ward
- Choibalsan Branch
- Nalaikh Branch
- Sansar Ward
- Selbe Ward
- Sukhbaatar Ward

Ulaanbaatar Mongolia West Stake

- Bayangol Ward
- Enkhtaivan Ward
- Jargalant Ward
- Khan Uul Ward
- Khovd Branch
- Songino Ward
- Tuul Ward
- Unur Ward

Darkhan Mongolia District

- Erdenet Branch
- Khuuchin Darkhan Branch
- Mörön Branch
- Selenge Branch
- Shine Darkhan Branch
- Zuun Kharaa Branch

Other Congregations

- Oyu-Tolgoi Branch
- Mongolia Ulaanbaatar East Dispersed Members Unit*
- Mongolia Ulaanbaatar West Dispersed Members Unit*
- The Dispersed Members Units serves individuals and families in Mongolia not in proximity to a meetinghouse.

In addition, a church Employment Resource Center is located in Ulaanbaatar.

== Missions ==
Prior to establishment of a Mission, Mongolia was overseen by the Asia Area Presidency. The first missionary couples arrived in Mongolia in 1992 as educators. The first young missionaries arrived in 1993. In 1995, the Mongolia Ulaanbaatar Mission was established with Richard Cook as the first mission president. He and his wife were serving as missionaries in Mongolia prior to his assignment as mission president.

Mission	Organized
Mongolia Ulaanbaatar East	1 July 1995
Mongolia Ulaanbaatar West	1 July 2026

== Temples ==
As of May 2025, congregations in Mongolia were assigned to the Hong Kong China Temple District.

On October 1, 2023, during a General Conference address, LDS President Russell M. Nelson announced plans to build a temple in Ulaanbaatar, Mongolia.

339. Ulaanbaatar Mongolia Temple (Site announced); Official website; News & images	
Location: Announced: Size:	Ulaanbaatar, Mongolia; 1 October 2023 by Russell M. Nelson; 18,850 sq ft (1,751 m^{2}) on a 11-acre (4.5 ha) site

== See also ==
- Religion in Mongolia
- Christianity in Mongolia
