= The Church of Jesus Christ of Latter-day Saints in Hungary =

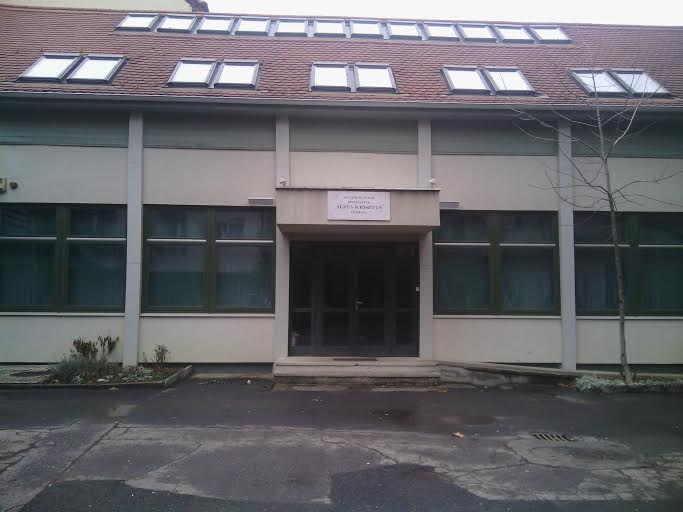
- A meetinghouse of The Church of Jesus Christ of Latter-day Saints in Eger
- Area: Europe Central
- Members: 5,274 (2025)
- Stakes: 1
- Districts: 2
- Wards: 5
- Branches: 14
- Total Congregations: 19
- Missions: 1
- Temples: 1 announced
- FamilySearch Centers: 12

The Church of Jesus Christ of Latter-day Saints in Hungary refers to the Church of Jesus Christ of Latter-day Saints (LDS Church) and its members in Hungary. There were 75 members in Hungary in 1990. There were 5,274 members in 21 congregations as of December 2025.

== History ==
Membership In Hungary
Year	Membership
1990	75
1999	3,191
2009	4,479
2019	5,231
2025	5,274
Source: Jim M. Wall, Deseret News, various years, Church Almanac Country Information: Hungary, Windall J. Ashton

On June 24, 1988, the church received legal recognition from the Hungarian government. On October 17, 1989, the first meetinghouse in Hungary was dedicated. The Book of Mormon was published in Hungarian in 1991. In 2003, a complex housing the mission office and home, a chapel, Church Educational System offices, classrooms, and an activity area was completed and dedicated in Budapest. The Budapest Hungary Stake, Hungary's first, was organized on June 4, 2006.

The church is one of 27 denominations officially recognized under Act C of Hungary’s Fundamental Law of 2011, which established a new process by which religious entities are recognized within the country.

In 2022, during the Ukrainian refugee crisis, the LDS Church reportedly provided funding to an organization renting the entirety of a 62-room hotel in Hungary. The facility was intended to house up to three hundred women and children for short-term stays.

== Church membership and organization ==
=== Stakes and districts ===
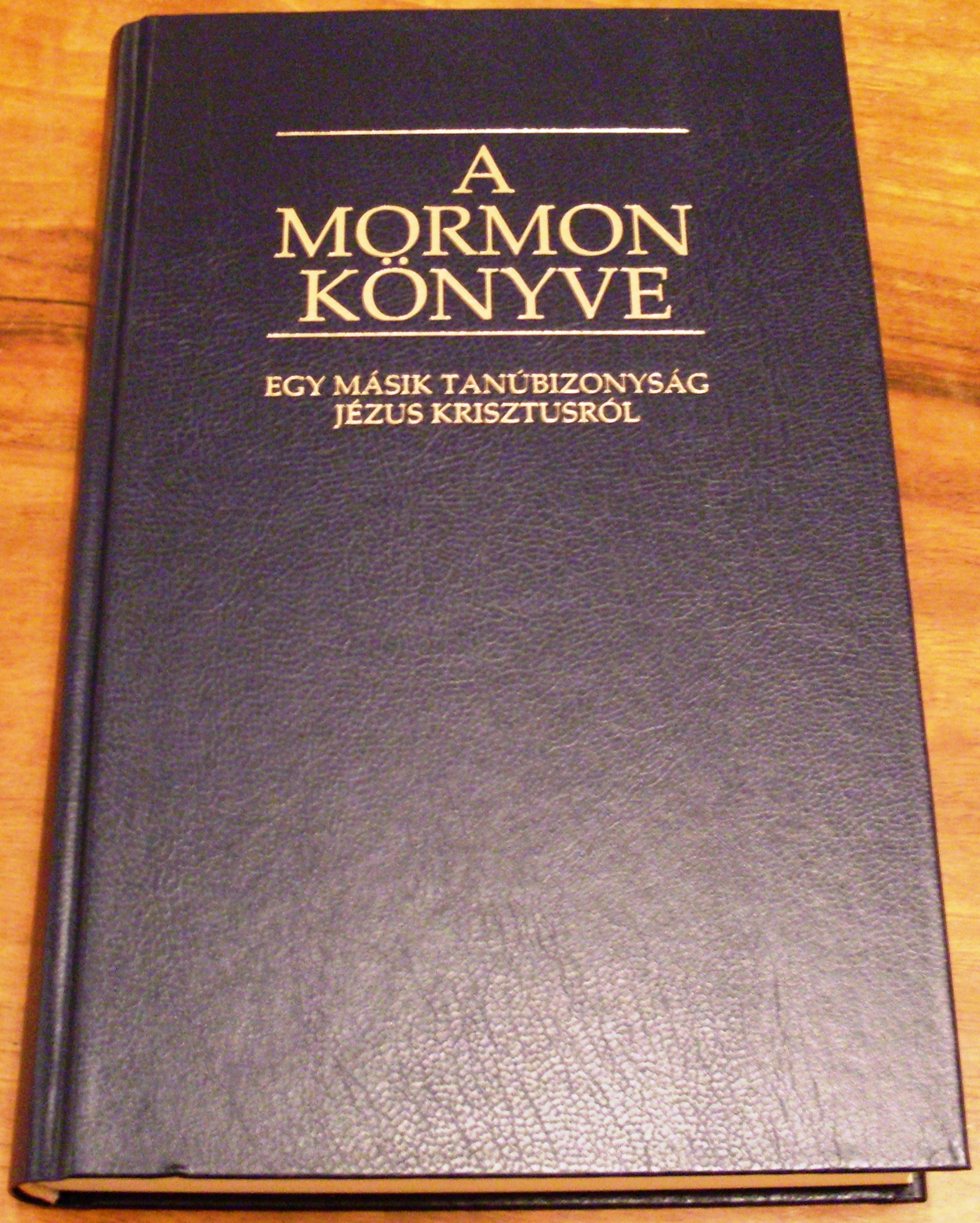
The Book of Mormon in Hungarian.

As of August 2026, the following stake and districts were located in Hungary:

Budapest Hungary Stake

- Buda Ward
- Dunaújváros Branch
- Győr Ward
- Kecskemét Ward
- Kispest Ward
- Pest Ward
- Pécs Branch
- Szeged Branch
- Szolnok Branch
- Székesfehérvár Branch
- Veszprém Branch

Debrecen Hungary District

- Békéscsaba Branch
- Debrecen Branch
- Eger Branch
- Miskolc Branch
- Nyíregyháza Branch

Szombathely Hungary District

- Pápa Branch
- Sopron Branch
- Szombathely Branch

Congregations not within a stake are named branches, regardless of size.

=== Missions ===
After the LDS Church gained official recognition in Hungary in 1988, the country became part of the Austria Vienna East Mission. The Hungary Budapest Mission was organized in June 1990. In July 2018, the name changed to the Hungary/Romania Mission.

In July 2023 the mission was divided with the creation of the Romania Bucharest Mission. The mission in Hungary was renamed to Hungary Budapest Mission.

=== Temples ===
The Budapest Hungary Temple was announced on April 7, 2019 by church president Russell M. Nelson.

262. Budapest Hungary Temple (Under construction); Official website; News & images	
Location: Announced: Groundbreaking: Size:	Budapest, Hungary; 7 April 2019 by Russell M. Nelson; 21 June 2025 by Ruben V. Alliaud; 18,000 sq ft (1,700 m^{2}) on a 5.92-acre (2.40 ha) site

== See also ==
- Religion in Hungary
