= The Church of Jesus Christ of Latter-day Saints in Madagascar =

Madagascar chapter of The Church of Jesus Christ of Latter-Day Saints

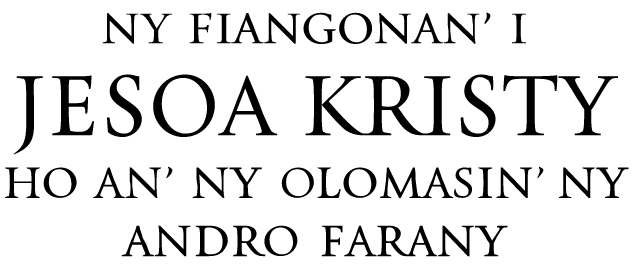
- (logo in Malagasy)
- Area: Africa South
- Members: 20,395 (2025)
- Stakes: 5
- Districts: 1
- Wards: 30
- Branches: 22
- Total Congregations: 52
- Missions: 2
- Temples: 1 under construction
- FamilySearch Centers: 16

The Church of Jesus Christ of Latter-day Saints in Madagascar refers to the Church of Jesus Christ of Latter-day Saints (LDS Church) and its members in Madagascar. In 1990, a small congregation was created in Madagascar. In 2025, there were 20,395 members in 46 congregations.

== History ==
Membership in Madagascar
Year	Membership
1993*	100
1995*	400
1999	1,349
2004	3,088
2009	4,769
2014	10,322
2019	12,887
2024	17,331
2025	20,395
*Membership was published as a rounded number.

The first branch of the LDS Church in Madagascar was organized in 1990 with Razanapanala Ramianadrisoa as president. Ramiandrisoa had joined the LDS Church in France while studying there in 1986. The first LDS missionaries to enter Madagascar were Fred L. Forsgren and his wife Eileen who arrived in March 1991. The Church was legally recognized by the government of Madagascar in 1993.

Until 1998 missionary work in Madagascar was supervised from South Africa, but a separate mission for Madagascar was organized in 1998. The first LDS Church-built meetinghouse in Madagascar was completed in May 1999.

The Book of Mormon was translated to Malagasy in 2000. Also that year the first stake in Madagascar, the Antananarivo Madagascar Stake was organized with Dominique L. Andriamanantoa as president.

In 2017, an outbreak of pneumonic and bubonic plague caused 80 nonnative missionaries to leave the island. In 2020, the LDS Church temporarily canceled services and other public gatherings in response to the spread of the coronavirus pandemic which resumed online and/or in person, depending on the congregation.

== Stakes and Districts ==
Stake	Organized	Mission
Antananarivo Madagascar Ampefiloha Stake	22 Oct 2023	Madagascar Antananarivo South
Antananarivo Madagascar Ampitatafika Stake	1 Mar 2026	Madagascar Antananarivo South
Antananarivo Madagascar Ivandry Stake	13 Mar 2011	Madagascar Antananarivo North
Antananarivo Madagascar Manakambahiny Stake	17 Sep 2000	Madagascar Antananarivo South
Antsirabe Madagascar Stake	3 Aug 2025	Madagascar Antananarivo South
Toamasina Madagascar Stake	11 Dec 2022	Madagascar Antananarivo North
Tolagnaro Madagascar District	18 Mar 2018	Madagascar Antananarivo South

Congregations in Madagascar not part of a stake or district include:

- Fianarantsoa Branch
- Mahajanga Branch
- Mahavatse Branch
- Moramanga Branch
- Toliara Branch
- Tsianolondroa Branch
- Madagascar Antananarivo North Dispersed Members Unit
- Madagascar Antananarivo South Dispersed Members Unit

The Madagascar Antananarivo North and South Dispersed Members Units serves families and individuals in Madagascar that is not in proximity of a meetinghouse.

== Mission ==
The Madagascar Antananarivo Mission was created on 1 July 1998 as a division of the South Africa Durban and the South Africa Johannesburg Missions. The Madagascar Antananarivo North Mission encompasses Northern Madagascar and all of Mauritius and Reunion. The Madagascar Antananarivo South Mission encompasses Southern Madagascar.

Mission	Organized
Madagascar Antananarivo North	June 2024
Madagascar Antananarivo South	1 July 1998

=== Mauritius ===
The LDS Church reported 612 members in 3 congregations in Mauritius for year-end 2025.

Mauritius District

- Flacq Branch
- Phoenix Branch
- Rose Hill Branch.

=== Reunion ===
The LDS Church reported 989 members in 4 congregations and 5 FamilySearch centers in Reunion for year-end 2025.

St Denis Reunion District

- Le Port Branch
- St Denis Branch
- St Marie Branch
- St Pierre Branch.

Family history centers are located at each of those meetinghouses.

== Temples ==
As of November 2025, Madagascar is in the Johannesburg South Africa Temple District. On October 3, 2021, in the Saturday Afternoon session of General Conference, Church President Russell M. Nelson announced the Antananarivo Madagascar Temple.

256. Antananarivo Madagascar Temple (Under construction); Official website; News & images	
Location: Announced: Groundbreaking: Size: Notes:	Antananarivo, Madagascar; 3 October 2021 by Russell M. Nelson; 15 March 2025 by Denelson Silva; 10,000 sq ft (930 m^{2}) on a 9.8-acre (4.0 ha) site Site announced on December 11, 2023

== See also ==
- Religion in Madagascar
