= The Church of Jesus Christ of Latter-day Saints in the United Arab Emirates =

Church in the United Arab Emirates

- Area: Middle East/ Africa North
- Members: 2,005 (2025)
- Stakes: 1
- Wards: 5
- Branches: 1
- Total congregations: 6
- Temples: 1 announced
- FamilySearch Centers: 1

The Church of Jesus Christ of Latter-day Saints in the United Arab Emirates refers to the Church of Jesus Christ of Latter-day Saints (LDS Church) and its members in the United Arab Emirates (UAE). The church's first self-standing meetinghouse in the Middle East was dedicated in Abu Dhabi in 2013. As of 2025, there are four meetinghouses and six congregations. In April 2020, the intent to construct a temple in Dubai was announced.

== History ==
Membership in the United Arab Emirates
Year	Membership
1988*	42
2005	400
2010	906
2015	1,524
2019	1,699
2024	1,810
2025	2,002
*includes members of neighboring countries that met in Dubai. Source: Jim M. Wall, Deseret News, various years, Church Almanac Country Information: United Arab Emirates, Wendall J. Ashton

The LDS Church formally began holding church services in Dubai in 1982 with the creation of the Dubai Branch, with Joseph B. Platt as its first president. The congregation grew from a small group of less than ten people to a stake organized by Jeffrey R. Holland in 2013. The stake covers four countries. In 2011, more than 60 percent of members in the UAE were Filipino.

== Abu Dhabi Stake ==
LDS Church buildings in the United Arab Emirates
Yellow = Announced Temple
Purple = Meetinghouse
(FHC)=Family History Center located inside meetinghouse

The Abu Dhabi Stake encompasses the UAE, Qatar, and Oman. As of May 2025, the Abu Dhabi Stake consists of at least seven wards and three branches (potentially others in nearby portions of Saudi Arabia which the LDS Church does not report): five wards and one branch exist in the UAE; 2 wards and a military branch in Doha, Qatar; and a branch in Muscat, Oman. A number of military congregations in this region are not included as part of the stake. Namely:

- Abu Dhabi 1st Ward
- Abu Dhabi 2nd Ward (Tagalog)
- Al Ain Branch
- Doha 1st Ward
- Doha 2nd Ward
- Doha 3rd Branch (Military Base)
- Dubai 1st Ward (Tagalog)
- Dubai 2nd Ward
- Oman Branch
- Sharjah Ward

== Missions ==
The UAE is part of the Middle East/North Africa Area, the church's only ecclesiastical area without a mission. Members are encouraged to follow and obey the laws of the land. Proselyting, especially among Muslims, is prohibited in Middle Eastern countries.

== Temples ==
On April 5, 2020, church president Russell M. Nelson announced that the government of the UAE had invited the church to construct a temple in Dubai. On October 26, 2021, David A. Bednar, along with other church leaders, visited the Expo 2020 area where the church announced the temple will be constructed. The temple is expected to serve 8,000 members living in two stakes in the Gulf states and a number of congregations in the Middle East, northern Africa, eastern Europe and western Asia. The property is expected to include a meetinghouse and the temple. As of December 2022, discussions between the LDS Church and local authorities concerning the temple plot and design were still underway.

297. Dubai United Arab Emirates Temple (Announced); Official website; News & images	
Location: Announced:	Dubai, United Arab Emirates; 5 April 2020 by Russell M. Nelson

== See also ==
- Religion in the United Arab Emirates
- Christianity in the United Arab Emirates#The Church of Jesus Christ of Latter-day Saints
