= The Church of Jesus Christ of Latter-day Saints in Papua New Guinea =

- Area: Pacific
- Members: 46,583 (2025)
- Stakes: 6
- Districts: 8
- Wards: 33
- Branches: 63
- Total Congregations: 96
- Missions: 2
- Temples: 1 under construction
- FamilySearch Centers: 2

The Church of Jesus Christ of Latter-day Saints in Papua New Guinea refers to the Church of Jesus Christ of Latter-day Saints (LDS Church) and its members in Papua New Guinea (PNG). The first missionaries arrived in 1980. As of December 31, 2025, there were 46,583 members in 96 congregations, making it the largest body of LDS Church members in Melanesia and the fifth largest in Oceania.

== History ==
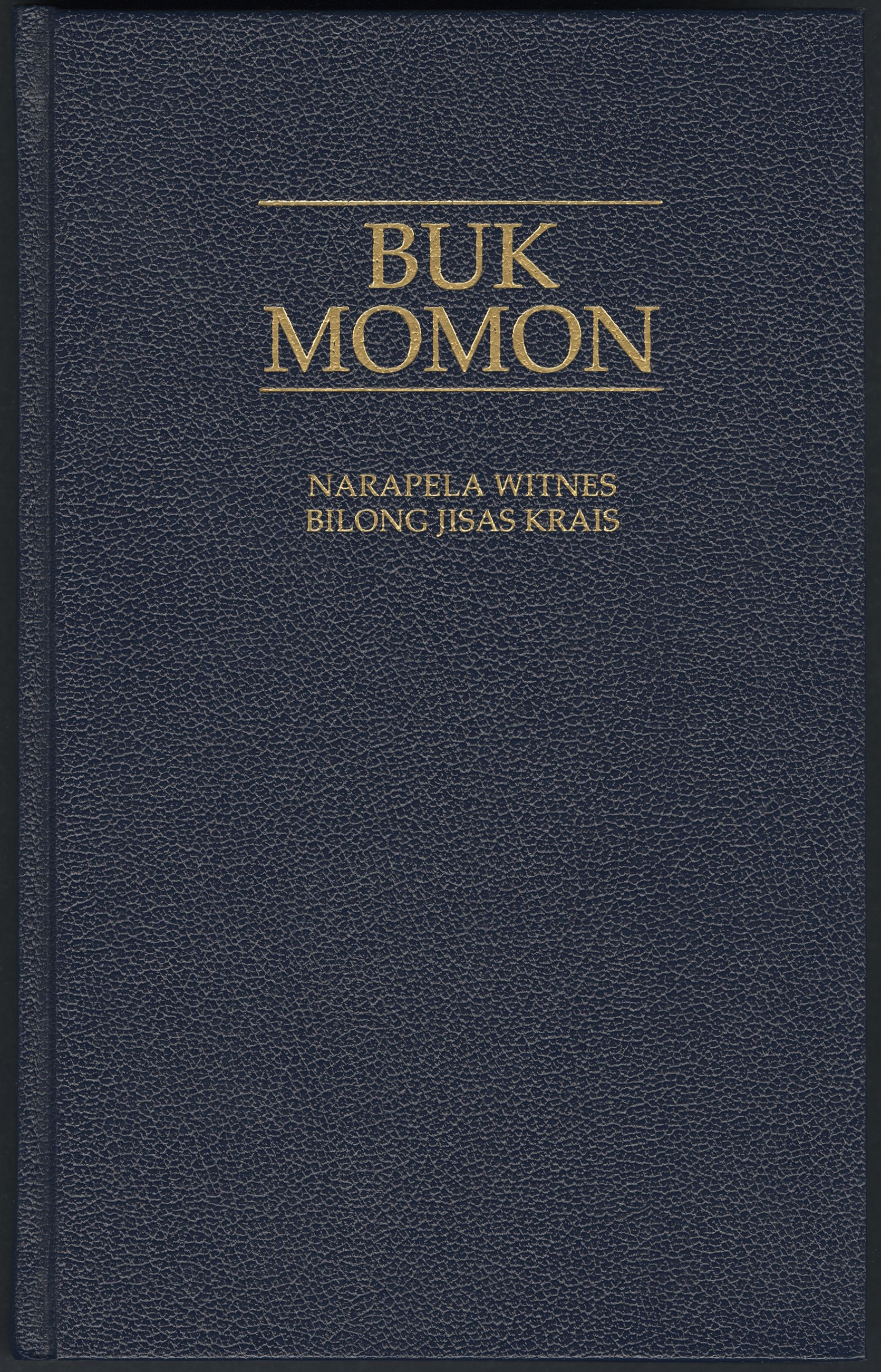
Tok Pisin translation of the Book of Mormon

Membership in Papua New Guinea
Year	Membership
1980	280
1985*	1,200
1989*	2,100
1995*	4,700
1999	8,954
2004	13,895
2009	16,664
2014	22,982
2019	30,825
2024	41,268
2025	46,583
*Membership was published as a rounded number.

== Stakes & districts ==
Stake	Organized	Mission
Daru Papua New Guinea Stake	29 May 2011	Papua New Guinea Daru
Gerehu Papua New Guinea District	10 Mar 2002	Papua New Guinea Port Moresby
Goroka Papua New Guinea District	14 Apr 2002	Papua New Guinea Lae
Isumo Papua New Guinea District	6 Mar 2016	Papua New Guinea Daru
Lae Papua New Guinea Stake	25 May 2025	Papua New Guinea Lae
Madang Papua New Guinea Stake	22 Sep 2024	Papua New Guinea Madang
Minj Papua New Guinea Stake	3 Aug 2025	Papua New Guinea Lae
Moveave Papua New Guinea District	16 Oct 2011	Papua New Guinea Port Moresby
Oro Papua New Guinea Stake	15 Jun 2025	Papua New Guinea Port Moresby
Port Moresby Papua New Guinea Stake	22 Oct 1995	Papua New Guinea Port Moresby
Rigo Papua New Guinea District	27 Jul 2008	Papua New Guinea Port Moresby
Sepik River Papua New Guinea District	14 Feb 2012	Papua New Guinea Madang
Sogere Papua New Guinea District	10 Nov 2010	Papua New Guinea Daru
Suki Papua New Guinea District	26 May 2011	Papua New Guinea Daru
Wewak Papua New Guinea District	18 May 2026	Papua New Guinea Madang

The following congregations are not part of a stake or district

- Alotau Branch (Port Moresby Mission)
- Kiunga Branch (Daru Mission)
- Papua New Guinea Madang Dispersed Members Unit
- Papua New Guinea Port Moresby Dispersed Members Unit

The Papua New Guinea Lae Dispersed Members Unit and the Papua New Guinea Port Moresby Dispersed Members Unit serves individuals and families that are not in proximity to a meetinghouse.

== Missions ==
Mission	Organized
Papua New Guinea Port Moresby Mission	7 Feb 1992
Papua New Guinea Lae Mission	1 Jul 2013

== Temples ==
The Port Moresby Papua New Guinea Temple was announced on October 5, 2019 by church president Russell M. Nelson.

241. Port Moresby Papua New Guinea Temple (Under construction); Official website; News & images	
Location: Announced: Groundbreaking: Size:	Port Moresby, Papua New Guinea; 5 October 2019 by Russell M. Nelson; 22 April 2023 by Peter F. Meurs; 9,550 sq ft (887 m^{2}) on a 4.45-acre (1.80 ha) site

== See also ==
- Religion in Papua New Guinea
