= Suva Fiji Temple =

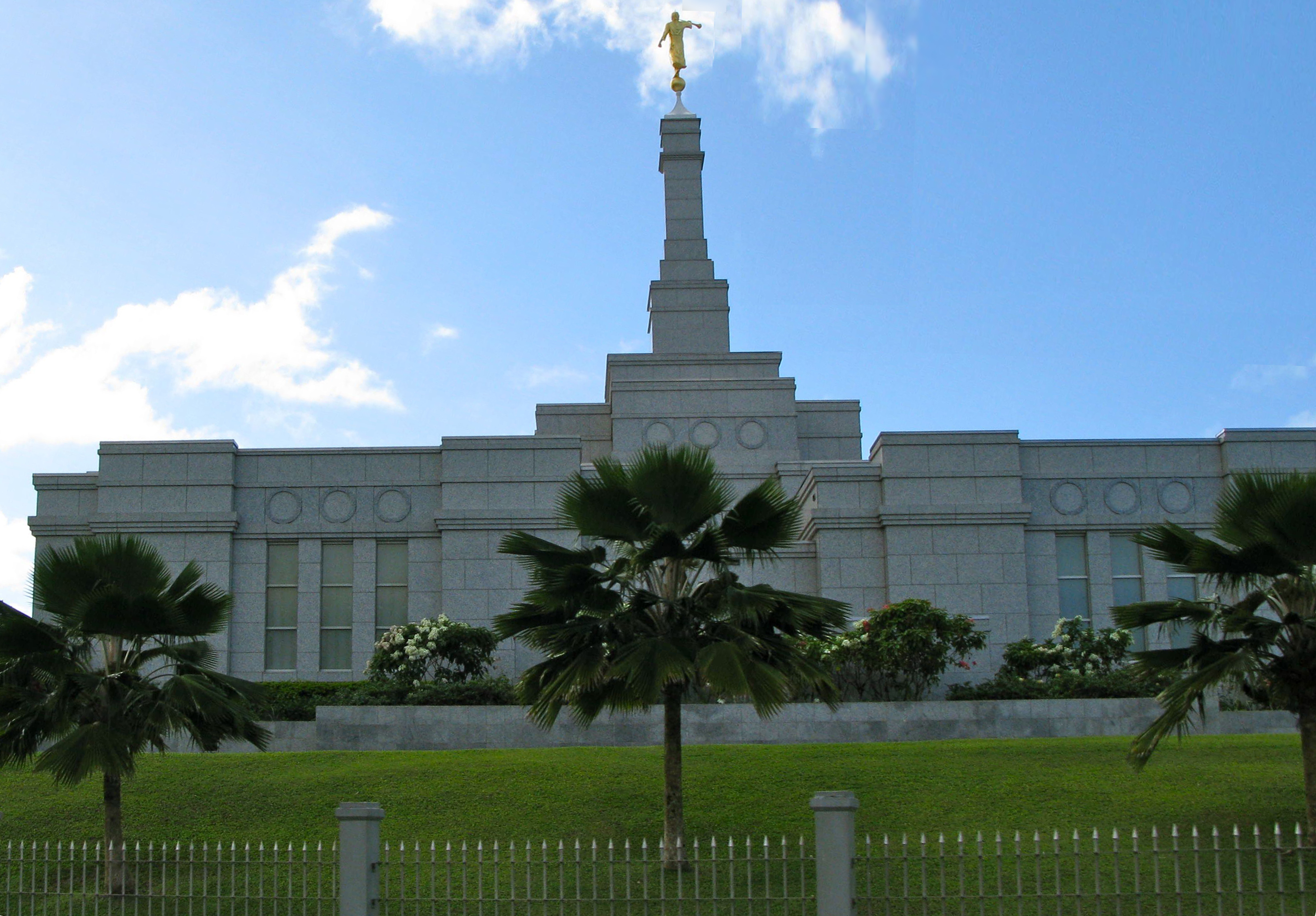
- Interactive map of Suva Fiji Temple
- Number: 91
- Dedication: 18 June 2000, by Gordon B. Hinckley
- Site: 4.7 acres (1.9 ha)
- Floor area: 12,755 ft^{2} (1,185.0 m^{2})
- Height: 71 ft (22 m)
- Official website • News & images

Church chronology
← Melbourne Australia Temple	Suva Fiji Temple	→ Mérida Mexico Temple

Additional information
- Announced: 7 May 1998, by Gordon B. Hinckley
- Groundbreaking: 8 May 1999, by Earl M. Monson
- Open house: 7–12 June 2000; 25 January–6 February 2015 (after renovations)
- Rededicated: 21 February 2016, by Henry B. Eyring
- Current president: Paul B. Whippy
- Designed by: Conway Beg
- Location: Suva, Fiji
- Coordinates: 18°7′11″S 178°26′18.8″E
- Exterior finish: Snow white granite of Campolonghi, Italy
- Design: Classic modern, single-spire design
- Baptistries: 1
- Ordinance rooms: 2 (two-stage progressive)
- Sealing rooms: 2

The Suva Fiji Temple is the 91st operating temple of the Church of Jesus Christ of Latter-day Saints (LDS Church). The intent to build the temple was announced on 5 April 1998, by church president Gordon B. Hinckley during the church's general conference. The temple is the first to be built in Fiji.

This temple was designed by Conway Beg of Architects Pacific, using a traditional temple design. A groundbreaking ceremony, to signify the beginning of construction, was held on 8 May 1999, with Earl M. Monson, a church general authority, presiding.

== History ==
The church's first missionaries visited Fiji in 1953. The church's first recorded meeting was held on 25 July 1954, in the Matanisiga Hall in Toorak, Suva. After visiting the island in 1955, church president David O. McKay, opened its first branch in Fiji, calling missionaries to increase outreach to Fijians and Indians. In 1975, the church's Fiji Technical College was opened. The Suva Fiji Stake, the country's first, was organized 12 June 1983, with Inosi Naga as president. Stakes were later created in Viti Levu and districts in Vanua Levu and Taveuni as membership grew. The number of congregations increased from 19 to 41 in the 1990s.

On 5 April 1998, church president Gordon B. Hinckley announced that a temple would be built in Fiji. The site in Suva was announced on 7 May 1998.

A groundbreaking ceremony were held for the temple on 8 May 1999. Earl M. Monson, a member of the Second Quorum of the Seventy, presided at the ceremony. The site chosen for the temple was 4.7 acres (19,000 m^{2}), with the Pacific Ocean visible from three sides of the property on one of the tallest hills in the area, and just minutes from downtown Suva. The exterior of the temple is finished with Snow-white granite from Campolonghi, Italy and the grounds are beautifully landscaped.

After construction was completed, the temple was open for public tours from 7 June to 12 June 2000. Just before the open house, starting on 19 May, political unrest occurred in Fiji. A group of armed rebels held a group of government leaders hostage in Suva for weeks. Those held hostage included the Prime Minister of Fiji at the time, Mahendra Chaudhry. The situation was so intense that the church decided to send all of the missionaries in the area to the other side of the island to avoid any dangerous situations. Despite these problems and little media attention over 16,000 people toured the temple including 300 community leaders. Those who toured the temple were able to see the two ordinance rooms, two sealing rooms, celestial room, baptistery, and learn more about the church's beliefs associated with the temple.

The temple was dedicated on 18 June 2000 by Hinckley. Because of the 2000 Fijian coup d'état, which had been occurring since before the open house, it was decided that a small dedication service would be best and the normal quantity of dedicatory services were abandoned. Sixty people attended the dedication.

On 30 July 2014, the church announced that the temple would close for renovations on 13 October 2014. The renovations were completed in November 2015, and an open house was held from 25 January to 6 February 2016. On 20 February 2016, a cultural celebration was held to commemorate the rededication, but the event was cut short due to adverse weather conditions caused by Tropical Cyclone Winston. The temple was rededicated on 21 February 2016, by Henry B. Eyring. Instead of being held in the temple, as is usual, the rededication took place in a nearby mission home due to a mandatory curfew in place as a result of the cyclone.

== Design and architecture ==
The building has a traditional Latter-day Saint temple design.

=== Site ===
The temple sits on a 10-acre plot which is located on one of the highest points of the city, with views of the Pacific Ocean from three sides, and the landscaping around it featuring native subtropical vegetation.

=== Exterior ===
The structure stands 72 feet (22 m) tall, constructed with granite. It has a single spire with a statue of the angel Moroni. The design uses elements that reflect both the local culture and broader church symbolism.

=== Interior ===
The interior features art glass and a hand-painted mural, centred around a theme of the natural landscapes of Fiji, designed to create a spiritually uplifting environment. The temple includes two endowment rooms, two sealing rooms, a celestial room, and a baptistry, each arranged for ceremonial use.

=== Symbols ===
The design has elements representing Latter-day Saint symbolism, to provide deeper spiritual meaning to the temple's appearance and function. Symbolism is important to church members, one of the most important symbols is the temple itself, as a symbol of faith to members.

== Renovations ==
The temple closed on 13 October 2014 for renovations that included improving air conditioning and adding new finishes inside the building. After renovations were completed, a public open house was held from Monday, 25 January 2016, through Saturday, 6 February 2016, excluding Sunday, 31 January. The temple was rededicated by Henry B. Eyring on Sunday, 21 February 2016. The temple was rededicated the day after landfall of Cyclone Winston, the strongest tropical cyclone ever recorded in Fiji. The cyclone forced changes to the cultural celebration held the day prior to the rededication.

== Temple presidents ==
The church's temples are directed by a temple president and matron, each serving for a term of three years. The president and matron oversee the administration of temple operations and provide guidance and training for both temple patrons and staff.

The first president of the Suva Fiji Temple was Sitiveni W. Bale, with the matron being Vasiti R. Bale. As of 2024, the president is Meli U. Lesuma, with Irene L. Lesuma serving as matron.

== Admittance ==
Following the completion of the temple, the church announced that a public open house would be held from 7 June to 12 June 2002. The temple was dedicated by Gordon B. Hinckley on 18 June 2000. Following the temple’s renovation period, another open house was held, from 25 January to 6 February 2016, and the temple was rededicated by Henry B. Eyring on 21 February 2016. Like all the church's temples, it is not used for Sunday worship services. To members of the church, temples are regarded as sacred houses of the Lord. Once dedicated, only church members with a current temple recommend can enter for worship.

== See also ==
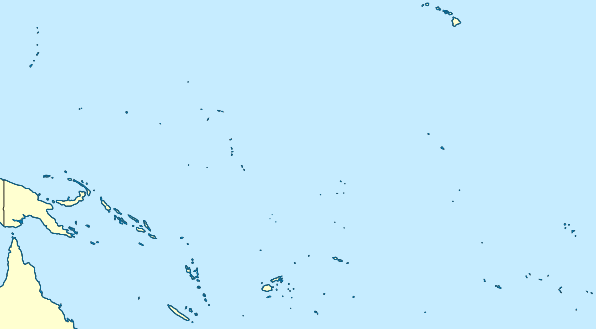
Temples in the Pacific Islands
- = Operating
- = Under construction
- = Announced
- = Temporarily Closed
- List of temples of The Church of Jesus Christ of Latter-day Saints
- List of temples of The Church of Jesus Christ of Latter-day Saints by geographic region
- Temple architecture (LDS Church)
