= List of temples (LDS Church) =

Worldwide Temples

Temples of the Church of Jesus Christ of Latter-day Saints (LDS Church) are buildings dedicated to be a House of the Lord. They are considered by church members to be the most sacred structures on earth. When construction is completed, temples are usually open to the public for a short period of time (an "open house"). During the open house, tours of the temple are conducted, with members from the local area and missionaries serving as tour guides, and all rooms are open to the public. The temple is then dedicated as a "House of the Lord," after which only members twelve years of age and older who hold a valid temple recommend are permitted to enter. Weekly worship services are not held in temples, but ordinances that are part of Latter-day Saint worship are performed within temples.

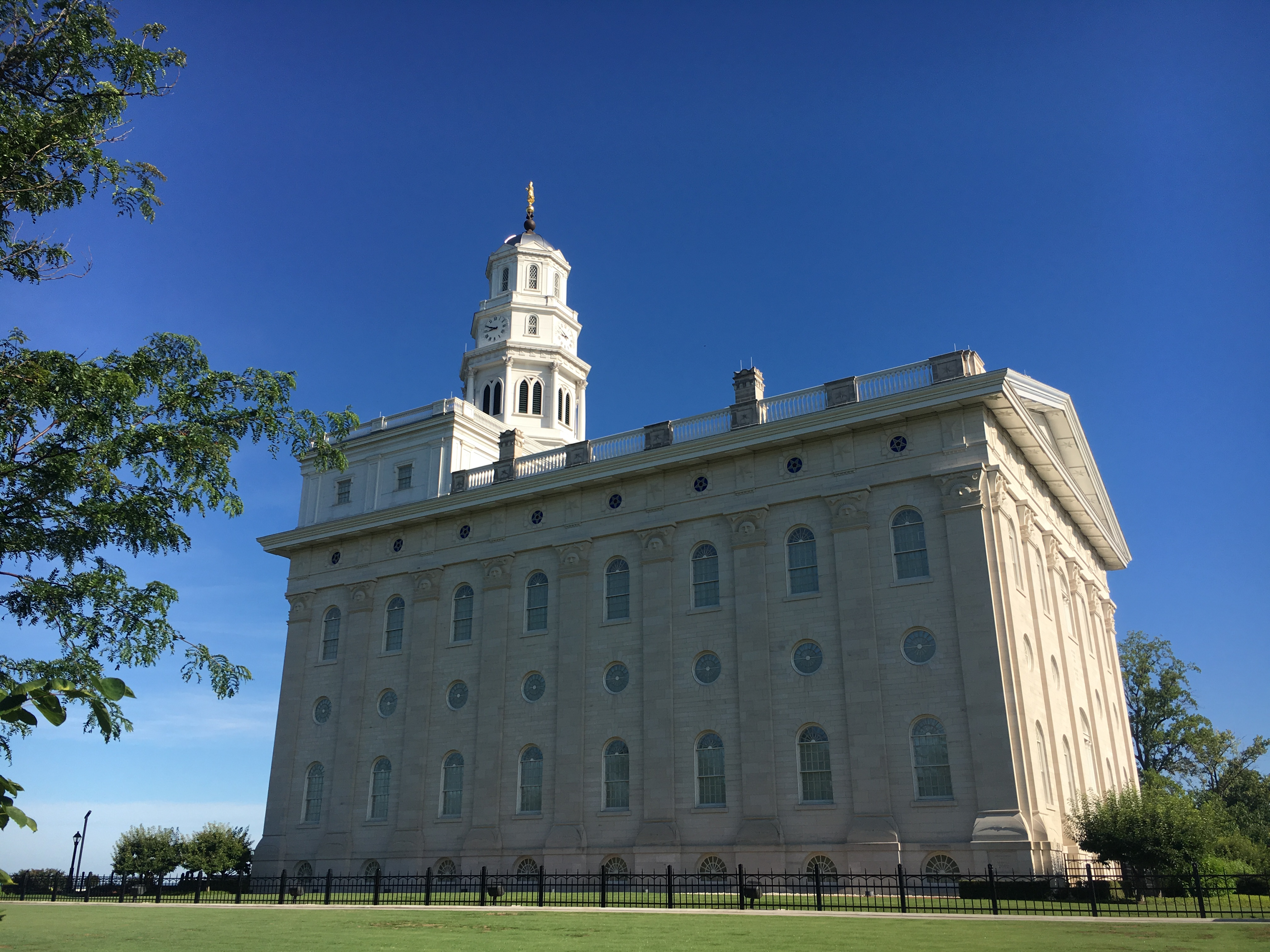
The Nauvoo Illinois Temple, built in 2002 and based on the original Nauvoo Temple that was built in 1846 and destroyed in 1848

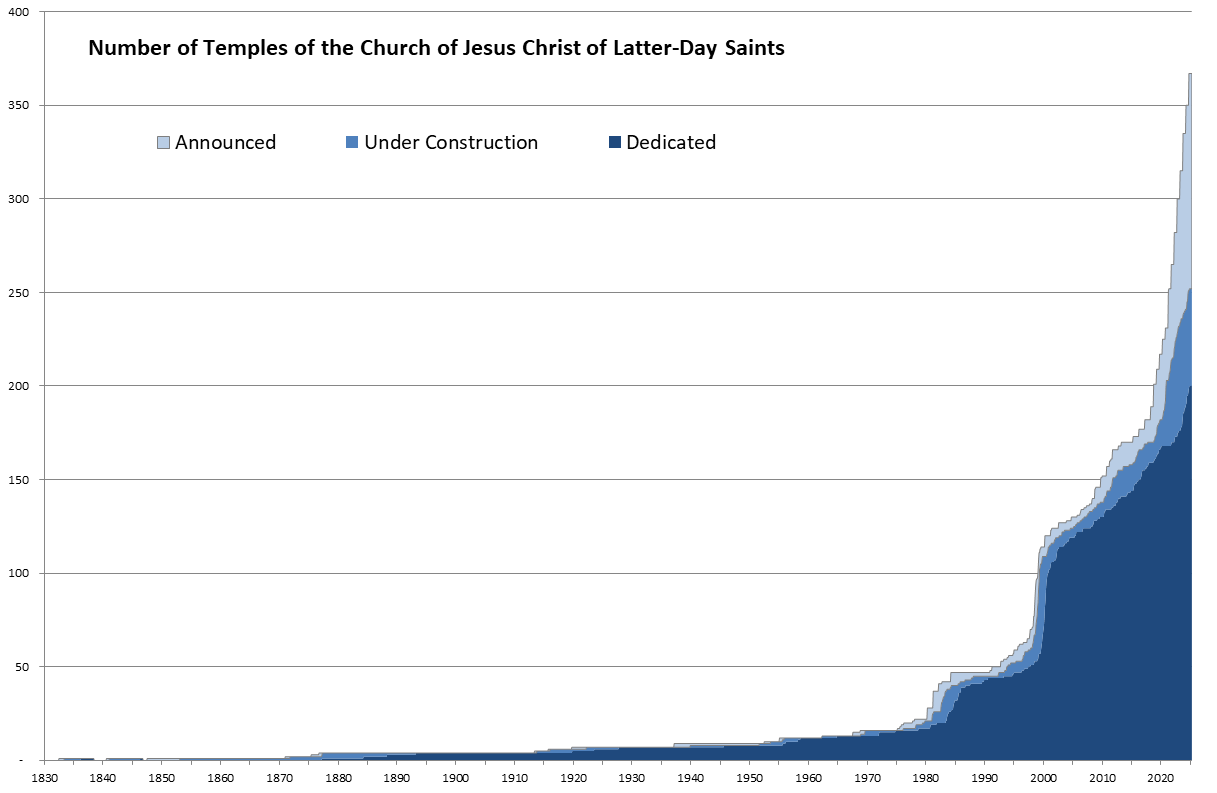
Chart of temple construction as of November 2024

Within temples, members of the church make covenants, receive instructions, and perform sacred ordinances, such as: baptism for the dead, washing and anointing (or "initiatory"), the endowment, and eternal marriage, also referred to as sealings. Ordinances are a vital part of the theology of the church, which teaches that they were practiced by the Lord's covenant people in all dispensations. Additionally, members consider the temple a place to commune with God, seek His aid, understand His will, and receive personal revelation.

== History ==
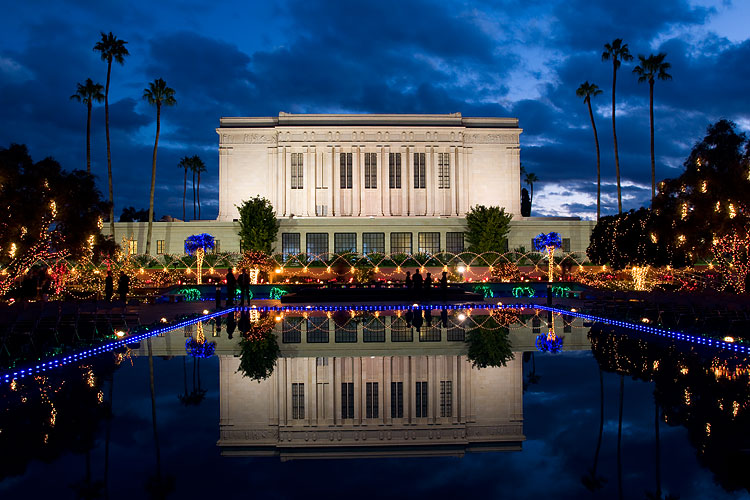
The Mesa Arizona Temple, one of three patterned after the Temple of Solomon

In 1832, shortly after the formation of the church, Joseph Smith said that the Lord desired the saints build a temple; and they completed the Kirtland Temple in 1836. After the death of Joseph Smith in 1844, ownership of the temple shifted, eventually resulting in the Kirtland Temple Suit court case 1880. While the court case was dismissed, the Reorganized Church of Jesus Christ of Latter Day Saints (RLDS Church, now Community of Christ) secured ownership of the temple through adverse possession by at least 1901. On March 5, 2024, the LDS Church and Community of Christ announced that ownership of the Kirtland Temple had transferred to the former as part of a $192.5 million acquisition of historic sites and objects. Initially, the church constructed temples in areas where there were large concentrations of members: Utah, Idaho, Arizona, Hawaii (all in the USA), and Alberta (Canada). In the mid-20th century, because of the importance of temples in the theology, the church tried to balance density with the travel requirements attending the temple imposed upon members. Thus, temples were built in Europe (namely, Switzerland dedicated in 1955 and England dedicated in 1958); the Pacific Islands (namely, New Zealand dedicated in 1958); and Washington, D.C. (dedicated in 1974, the first American temple East of Utah since Nauvoo in 1846). All were dedicated at a time when membership in the region alone might not have justified the effort.

In the 1980s, church president Spencer W. Kimball (1895–1985) directed that smaller temples with similar designs be built allowing temples to be built where there were fewer members. As a result, the first temples in South America (Brazil dedicated in 1978); Asia (Japan dedicated in 1980); and Mexico (Mexico City dedicated in 1983) were built and the number of temples doubled from 15 to 36.

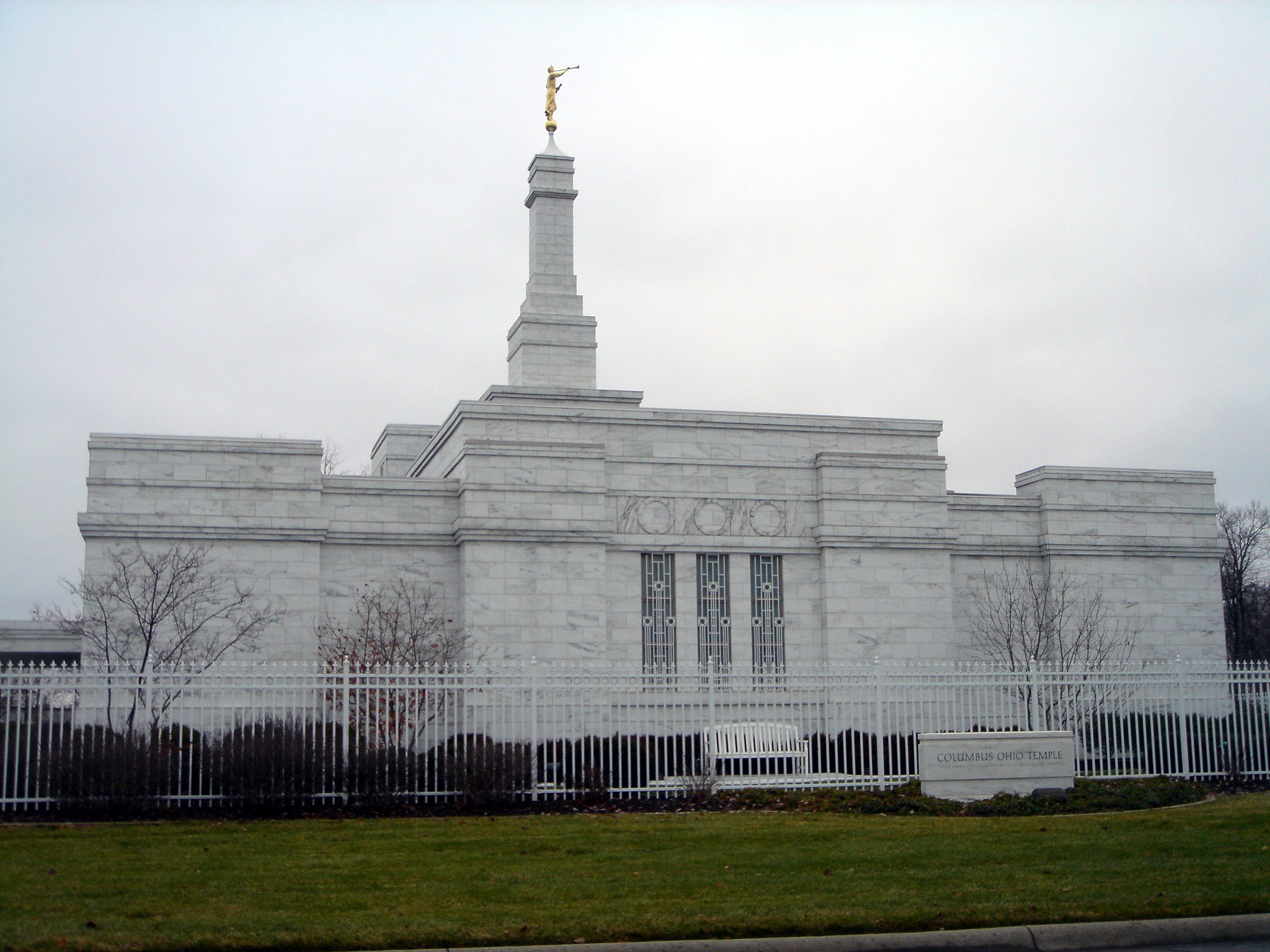
The Columbus Ohio Temple, an example of smaller temples built under Hinckley's direction

Church president Gordon B. Hinckley (1910–2008) also accelerated the construction of temples through the use of an even smaller standardized base design. In 1998, when there were 51 temples, Hinckley set a goal to have 100 temples in place before the end of 2000. Between the brief building period from 1998 to 2001, 38 of these standardized temples were constructed and dedicated, meeting Hinckley's goal by having 102 dedicated temples before 2000 closed. During Hinckley's service as president, the number of temples more than doubled from 47 to 124.

On October 7, 2018, Russell M. Nelson announced the intent to construct 12 more temples, putting the church's total number of temples operating, under construction, or announced above 200. This high pace of announcement continued and by October 2022, the number of temples exceeded 300 temples announced, with 315. With 15 temples announced at the April 2025 General Conference, the church's total number of temples operating, under construction, or announced reached 382.

== List of temples ==
The LDS Church has 385 temples in various phases, which includes 227 dedicated temples (221 operating, 6 undergoing renovations), 8 with dedications scheduled, 57 under construction, 7 with groundbreaking ceremonies scheduled, and 86 others announced (not yet under construction).

=== Destroyed ===
| Image | Name | Status | Area | | Dedication | |
| Image | Name | Status | Floor | Site | Date | by |
|---|---|---|---|---|---|---|
| | Nauvoo Temple | Destroyed | 54,000 sq ft (5,017 m^{2}) | | May 1, 1846 | Orson Hyde |
| Map | Apia Samoa Temple (original) | Destroyed | 14,560 sq ft (1,353 m^{2}) | 2 acres (8,094 m^{2}) | August 5, 1983 | Gordon B. Hinckley |
| | Endowment House | Demolished | | | | |

=== Temple not in use ===
| Image | Name | Status | Area | | Dedication | |
| Image | Name | Status | Floor | Site | Date | by |
|---|---|---|---|---|---|---|
| | Kirtland Temple | Historic site | 15,000 sq ft (1,394 m^{2}) | 5.8 acres (23,472 m^{2}) | March 27, 1836 | Joseph Smith |

=== Dedicated ===
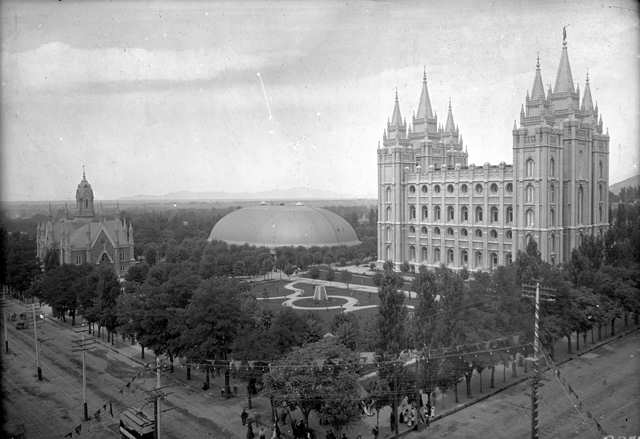
Salt Lake Temple on Temple Square c. 1897

| Image | Nº | Name | Status | Area | | Dedication | |
| Image | Nº | Name | Status | Floor | Site | Date | by |
|---|---|---|---|---|---|---|---|
| | 1 | St. George Utah Temple | Operating | 143,969 sq ft (13,375 m^{2}) | 6.5 acres (26,305 m^{2}) | April 6, 1877 | Daniel H. Wells |
| | 2 | Logan Utah Temple | Operating | 119,619 sq ft (11,113 m^{2}) | 9 acres (36,422 m^{2}) | May 17, 1884 | John Taylor |
| | 3 | Manti Utah Temple | Operating | 74,792 sq ft (6,948 m^{2}) | 27 acres (109,265 m^{2}) | May 21, 1888 | Lorenzo Snow |
| | 4 | Salt Lake Temple | Closed for renovation | 382,207 sq ft (35,508 m^{2}) | 10 acres (40,469 m^{2}) | 6 April 1893 | Wilford Woodruff |
| | 5 | Laie Hawaii Temple | Operating | 42,100 sq ft (3,911 m^{2}) | 11.4 acres (46,134 m^{2}) | November 27, 1919 | Heber J. Grant |
| | 6 | Cardston Alberta Temple | Operating | 88,562 sq ft (8,228 m^{2}) | 10 acres (40,469 m^{2}) | 26 August 1923 | Heber J. Grant |
| | 7 | Mesa Arizona Temple | Operating | 113,916 sq ft (10,583 m^{2}) | 20 acres (80,937 m^{2}) | October 23, 1927 | Heber J. Grant |
| | 8 | Idaho Falls Idaho Temple | Operating | 116,250 sq ft (10,800 m^{2}) | 7 acres (28,328 m^{2}) | September 23, 1945 | George Albert Smith |
| | 9 | Bern Switzerland Temple | Operating | 35,546 sq ft (3,302 m^{2}) | 7 acres (28,328 m^{2}) | 11 September 1955 | David O. McKay |
| | 10 | Los Angeles California Temple | Operating | 190,614 sq ft (17,709 m^{2}) | 13 acres (52,609 m^{2}) | March 11, 1956 | David O. McKay |
| | 11 | Hamilton New Zealand Temple | Operating | 45,251 sq ft (4,204 m^{2}) | 86 acres (348,030 m^{2}) | 20 April 1958 | David O. McKay |
| | 12 | London England Temple | Operating | 42,652 sq ft (3,963 m^{2}) | 32 acres (129,499 m^{2}) | 7 September 1958 | David O. McKay |
| | 13 | Oakland California Temple | Operating | 80,157 sq ft (7,447 m^{2}) | 18.1 acres (73,248 m^{2}) | November 17, 1964 | David O. McKay |
| | 14 | Ogden Utah Temple | Operating | 112,232 sq ft (10,427 m^{2}) | 9.96 acres (40,307 m^{2}) | January 18, 1972 | Joseph Fielding Smith |
| | 15 | Provo Utah Temple | Closed for renovation | 128,325 sq ft (11,922 m^{2}) | 17 acres (68,797 m^{2}) | February 9, 1972 | Joseph Fielding Smith |
| | 16 | Washington D.C. Temple | Operating | 156,558 sq ft (14,545 m^{2}) | 52 acres (210,437 m^{2}) | November 19, 1974 | Spencer W. Kimball |
| | 17 | São Paulo Brazil Temple | Operating | 59,246 sq ft (5,504 m^{2}) | 1.85 acres (7,487 m^{2}) | 30 October 1978 | Spencer W. Kimball |
| | 18 | Tokyo Japan Temple | Operating | 53,997 sq ft (5,016 m^{2}) | 1.22 acres (4,937 m^{2}) | 27 October 1980 | Spencer W. Kimball |
| | 19 | Seattle Washington Temple | Operating | 110,000 sq ft (10,219 m^{2}) | 23.5 acres (95,101 m^{2}) | November 17, 1980 | Spencer W. Kimball |
| | 20 | Jordan River Utah Temple | Operating | 148,236 sq ft (13,772 m^{2}) | 15 acres (60,703 m^{2}) | November 16, 1981 | Marion G. Romney |
| | 21 | Atlanta Georgia Temple | Operating | 34,500 sq ft (3,205 m^{2}) | 9.6 acres (38,850 m^{2}) | June 1, 1983 | Gordon B. Hinckley |
| Map | 22 | Apia Samoa Temple | Operating | 18,691 sq ft (1,736 m^{2}) | 2 acres (8,094 m^{2}) | 5 August 1983 | Gordon B. Hinckley |
| | 23 | Nuku'alofa Tonga Temple | Operating | 21,184 sq ft (1,968 m^{2}) | 1.2 acres (4,856 m^{2}) | 9 August 1983 | Gordon B. Hinckley |
| | 24 | Santiago Chile Temple | Operating | 20,831 sq ft (1,935 m^{2}) | 2.61 acres (10,562 m^{2}) | 15 September 1983 | Gordon B. Hinckley |
| | 25 | Papeete Tahiti Temple | Operating | 12,150 sq ft (1,129 m^{2}) | 1.7 acres (6,880 m^{2}) | 27 October 1983 | Gordon B. Hinckley |
| | 26 | Mexico City Mexico Temple | Operating | 116,642 sq ft (10,836 m^{2}) | 7 acres (28,328 m^{2}) | 2 December 1983 | Gordon B. Hinckley |
| | 27 | Boise Idaho Temple | Operating | 35,868 sq ft (3,332 m^{2}) | 4.83 acres (19,546 m^{2}) | May 25, 1984 | Gordon B. Hinckley |
| | 28 | Sydney Australia Temple | Operating | 30,677 sq ft (2,850 m^{2}) | 3 acres (12,141 m^{2}) | 20 September 1984 | Gordon B. Hinckley |
| | 29 | Manila Philippines Temple | Operating | 26,683 sq ft (2,479 m^{2}) | 3.5 acres (14,164 m^{2}) | 25 September 1984 | Gordon B. Hinckley |
| | 30 | Dallas Texas Temple | Operating | 44,207 sq ft (4,107 m^{2}) | 6 acres (24,281 m^{2}) | October 19, 1984 | Gordon B. Hinckley |
| | 31 | Taipei Taiwan Temple | Operating | 9,945 sq ft (924 m^{2}) | 0.5 acres (2,023 m^{2}) | 17 November 1984 | Gordon B. Hinckley |
| | 32 | Guatemala City Guatemala Temple | Operating | 11,610 sq ft (1,079 m^{2}) | 1.4 acres (5,666 m^{2}) | 14 December 1984 | Gordon B. Hinckley |
| | 33 | Freiberg Germany Temple | Operating | 21,500 sq ft (1,997 m^{2}) | 3.58 acres (14,488 m^{2}) | 29 June 1985 | Gordon B. Hinckley |
| | 34 | Stockholm Sweden Temple | Closed for renovation | 31,000 sq ft (2,880 m^{2}) | 4.47 acres (18,089 m^{2}) | 2 July 1985 | Gordon B. Hinckley |
| | 35 | Chicago Illinois Temple | Operating | 37,062 sq ft (3,443 m^{2}) | 13 acres (52,609 m^{2}) | August 9, 1985 | Gordon B. Hinckley |
| | 36 | Johannesburg South Africa Temple | Operating | 19,184 sq ft (1,782 m^{2}) | 1 acre (4,047 m^{2}) | 24 August 1985 | Gordon B. Hinckley |
| Map | 37 | Seoul Korea Temple | Operating | 28,057 sq ft (2,607 m^{2}) | 1 acre (4,047 m^{2}) | 14 December 1985 | Gordon B. Hinckley |
| | 38 | Lima Peru Temple | Operating | 9,600 sq ft (892 m^{2}) | 4.5 acres (18,211 m^{2}) | 10 January 1986 | Gordon B. Hinckley |
| | 39 | Buenos Aires Argentina Temple | Operating | 30,659 sq ft (2,848 m^{2}) | 3.73 acres (15,095 m^{2}) | 17 January 1986 | Thomas S. Monson |
| | 40 | Denver Colorado Temple | Operating | 29,177 sq ft (2,711 m^{2}) | 7.5 acres (30,351 m^{2}) | October 24, 1986 | Ezra Taft Benson |
| | 41 | Frankfurt Germany Temple | Operating | 32,895 sq ft (3,056 m^{2}) | 5.6 acres (22,662 m^{2}) | 28 August 1987 | Ezra Taft Benson |
| | 42 | Portland Oregon Temple | Operating | 80,500 sq ft (7,479 m^{2}) | 7.3 acres (29,542 m^{2}) | August 19, 1989 | Gordon B. Hinckley |
| | 43 | Las Vegas Nevada Temple | Operating | 80,350 sq ft (7,465 m^{2}) | 10.3 acres (41,683 m^{2}) | December 16, 1989 | Gordon B. Hinckley |
| | 44 | Toronto Ontario Temple | Operating | 55,558 sq ft (5,162 m^{2}) | 13.4 acres (54,228 m^{2}) | 25 August 1990 | Gordon B. Hinckley |
| | 45 | San Diego California Temple | Operating | 58,005 sq ft (5,389 m^{2}) | 7.2 acres (29,137 m^{2}) | 25 April 1993 | Gordon B. Hinckley |
| | 46 | Orlando Florida Temple | Closed for renovation | 70,000 sq ft (6,503 m^{2}) | 13 acres (52,609 m^{2}) | October 9, 1994 | Howard W. Hunter |
| | 47 | Bountiful Utah Temple | Operating | 104,000 sq ft (9,662 m^{2}) | 9 acres (36,422 m^{2}) | January 8, 1995 | Howard W. Hunter |
| | 48 | Hong Kong China Temple | Operating | 51,921 sq ft (4,824 m^{2}) | 0.31 acres (1,255 m^{2}) | 26 May 1996 | Gordon B. Hinckley |
| | 49 | Mount Timpanogos Utah Temple | Operating | 107,240 sq ft (9,963 m^{2}) | 16.7 acres (67,583 m^{2}) | October 13, 1996 | Gordon B. Hinckley |
| | 50 | St. Louis Missouri Temple | Operating | 58,749 sq ft (5,458 m^{2}) | 14 acres (56,656 m^{2}) | June 1, 1997 | Gordon B. Hinckley |
| | 51 | Vernal Utah Temple | Operating | 38,771 sq ft (3,602 m^{2}) | 1.6 acres (6,475 m^{2}) | November 2, 1997 | Gordon B. Hinckley |
| | 52 | Preston England Temple | Operating | 69,630 sq ft (6,469 m^{2}) | 32 acres (129,499 m^{2}) | 7 June 1998 | Gordon B. Hinckley |
| | 53 | Monticello Utah Temple | Operating | 11,225 sq ft (1,043 m^{2}) | 1.33 acres (5,382 m^{2}) | July 26, 1998 | Gordon B. Hinckley |
| | 54 | Anchorage Alaska Temple | Operating | 11,937 sq ft (1,109 m^{2}) | 5.4 acres (21,853 m^{2}) | January 9, 1999 | Gordon B. Hinckley |
| | 55 | Colonia Juárez Chihuahua Mexico Temple | Operating | 6,800 sq ft (632 m^{2}) | 2.56 acres (10,360 m^{2}) | 6 March 1999 | Gordon B. Hinckley |
| | 56 | Madrid Spain Temple | Operating | 45,800 sq ft (4,255 m^{2}) | 3.5 acres (14,164 m^{2}) | 19 March 1999 | Gordon B. Hinckley |
| | 57 | Bogotá Colombia Temple | Operating | 53,500 sq ft (4,970 m^{2}) | 3.71 acres (15,014 m^{2}) | 24 April 1999 | Gordon B. Hinckley |
| | 58 | Guayaquil Ecuador Temple | Operating | 45,000 sq ft (4,181 m^{2}) | 6.2 acres (25,091 m^{2}) | 1 August 1999 | Gordon B. Hinckley |
| | 59 | Spokane Washington Temple | Operating | 10,700 sq ft (994 m^{2}) | 2 acres (8,094 m^{2}) | August 21, 1999 | Gordon B. Hinckley |
| | 60 | Columbus Ohio Temple | Operating | 11,745 sq ft (1,091 m^{2}) | 5 acres (20,234 m^{2}) | September 4, 1999 | Gordon B. Hinckley |
| | 61 | Bismarck North Dakota Temple | Temporarily closed | 10,700 sq ft (994 m^{2}) | 1.6 acres (6,475 m^{2}) | | |
| | 62 | Columbia South Carolina Temple | Operating | 10,700 sq ft (994 m^{2}) | 3.6 acres (14,569 m^{2}) | October 16, 1999 | Gordon B. Hinckley |
| | 63 | Detroit Michigan Temple | Operating | 10,700 sq ft (994 m^{2}) | 6.34 acres (25,657 m^{2}) | October 23, 1999 | Gordon B. Hinckley |
| | 64 | Halifax Nova Scotia Temple | Operating | 10,700 sq ft (994 m^{2}) | 2 acres (8,094 m^{2}) | 14 November 1999 | Gordon B. Hinckley |
| | 65 | Regina Saskatchewan Temple | Operating | 10,700 sq ft (994 m^{2}) | 1 acre (4,047 m^{2}) | 14 November 1999 | Boyd K. Packer |
| | 66 | Billings Montana Temple | Operating | 33,800 sq ft (3,140 m^{2}) | 10 acres (40,469 m^{2}) | November 20, 1999 | Gordon B. Hinckley |
| | 67 | Edmonton Alberta Temple | Operating | 10,700 sq ft (994 m^{2}) | 1 acre (4,047 m^{2}) | 11 December 1999 | Gordon B. Hinckley |
| | 68 | Raleigh North Carolina Temple | Operating | 12,864 sq ft (1,195 m^{2}) | 3.17 acres (12,829 m^{2}) | December 18, 1999 | Gordon B. Hinckley |
| | 69 | St. Paul Minnesota Temple | Operating | 10,700 sq ft (994 m^{2}) | 7.5 acres (30,351 m^{2}) | January 9, 2000 | Gordon B. Hinckley |
| | 70 | Kona Hawaii Temple | Closed for renovation | 12,325 sq ft (1,145 m^{2}) | 7.02 acres (28,409 m^{2}) | January 23, 2000 | Gordon B. Hinckley |
| | 71 | Ciudad Juárez Mexico Temple | Operating | 10,700 sq ft (994 m^{2}) | 1.64 acres (6,637 m^{2}) | 26 February 2000 | Gordon B. Hinckley |
| | 72 | Hermosillo Sonora Mexico Temple | Operating | 10,769 sq ft (1,000 m^{2}) | 1.54 acres (6,232 m^{2}) | 27 February 2000 | Gordon B. Hinckley |
| | 73 | Albuquerque New Mexico Temple | Operating | 34,245 sq ft (3,181 m^{2}) | 8.5 acres (34,398 m^{2}) | March 5, 2000 | Gordon B. Hinckley |
| | 74 | Oaxaca Mexico Temple | Operating | 10,700 sq ft (994 m^{2}) | 1.87 acres (7,568 m^{2}) | 11 March 2000 | James E. Faust |
| | 75 | Tuxtla Gutiérrez Mexico Temple | Operating | 10,700 sq ft (994 m^{2}) | 1.56 acres (6,313 m^{2}) | 12 March 2000 | James E. Faust |
| | 76 | Louisville Kentucky Temple | Operating | 10,700 sq ft (994 m^{2}) | 3 acres (12,141 m^{2}) | March 19, 2000 | Thomas S. Monson |
| | 77 | Palmyra New York Temple | Operating | 10,900 sq ft (1,013 m^{2}) | 5 acres (20,234 m^{2}) | April 6, 2000 | Gordon B. Hinckley |
| | 78 | Fresno California Temple | Operating | 10,700 sq ft (994 m^{2}) | 2.34 acres (9,470 m^{2}) | April 9, 2000 | Gordon B. Hinckley |
| | 79 | Medford Oregon Temple | Operating | 10,700 sq ft (994 m^{2}) | 2 acres (8,094 m^{2}) | April 16, 2000 | James E. Faust |
| | 80 | Memphis Tennessee Temple | Operating | 10,890 sq ft (1,012 m^{2}) | 6.35 acres (25,698 m^{2}) | April 23, 2000 | James E. Faust |
| | 81 | Reno Nevada Temple | Operating | 10,700 sq ft (994 m^{2}) | 7.9 acres (31,970 m^{2}) | April 23, 2000 | Thomas S. Monson |
| | 82 | Cochabamba Bolivia Temple | Operating | 33,302 sq ft (3,094 m^{2}) | 6.67 acres (26,993 m^{2}) | 30 April 2000 | Gordon B. Hinckley |
| | 83 | Tampico Mexico Temple | Operating | 10,700 sq ft (994 m^{2}) | 2.96 acres (11,979 m^{2}) | 20 May 2000 | Thomas S. Monson |
| | 84 | Nashville Tennessee Temple | Operating | 10,700 sq ft (994 m^{2}) | 6.86 acres (27,761 m^{2}) | May 21, 2000 | James E. Faust |
| | 85 | Villahermosa Mexico Temple | Operating | 10,700 sq ft (994 m^{2}) | 1.36 acres (5,504 m^{2}) | 21 May 2000 | Thomas S. Monson |
| | 86 | Montreal Quebec Temple | Operating | 11,550 sq ft (1,073 m^{2}) | 2.4 acres (9,712 m^{2}) | 4 June 2000 | Gordon B. Hinckley |
| Map | 87 | San José Costa Rica Temple | Operating | 10,700 sq ft (994 m^{2}) | 1.93 acres (7,810 m^{2}) | 4 June 2000 | James E. Faust |
| | 88 | Fukuoka Japan Temple | Operating | 10,700 sq ft (994 m^{2}) | 1.25 acres (5,059 m^{2}) | 11 June 2000 | Gordon B. Hinckley |
| | 89 | Adelaide Australia Temple | Operating | 10,700 sq ft (994 m^{2}) | 6.94 acres (28,085 m^{2}) | 15 June 2000 | Gordon B. Hinckley |
| | 90 | Melbourne Australia Temple | Operating | 10,700 sq ft (994 m^{2}) | 5.98 acres (24,200 m^{2}) | 16 June 2000 | Gordon B. Hinckley |
| | 91 | Suva Fiji Temple | Operating | 12,755 sq ft (1,185 m^{2}) | 4.7 acres (19,020 m^{2}) | 18 June 2000 | Gordon B. Hinckley |
| | 92 | Mérida Mexico Temple | Operating | 10,700 sq ft (994 m^{2}) | 1.53 acres (6,192 m^{2}) | 8 July 2000 | Thomas S. Monson |
| | 93 | Veracruz Mexico Temple | Operating | 10,700 sq ft (994 m^{2}) | 3.39 acres (13,719 m^{2}) | 9 July 2000 | Thomas S. Monson |
| | 94 | Baton Rouge Louisiana Temple | Operating | 10,890 sq ft (1,012 m^{2}) | 6.3 acres (25,495 m^{2}) | July 16, 2000 | Gordon B. Hinckley |
| | 95 | Oklahoma City Oklahoma Temple | Operating | 10,890 sq ft (1,012 m^{2}) | 1 acre (4,047 m^{2}) | July 30, 2000 | James E. Faust |
| | 96 | Caracas Venezuela Temple | Operating | 15,332 sq ft (1,424 m^{2}) | 0.5 acres (2,023 m^{2}) | 20 August 2000 | Gordon B. Hinckley |
| | 97 | Houston Texas Temple | Operating | 33,970 sq ft (3,156 m^{2}) | 11 acres (44,515 m^{2}) | August 26, 2000 | Gordon B. Hinckley |
| | 98 | Birmingham Alabama Temple | Operating | 10,700 sq ft (994 m^{2}) | 5.6 acres (22,662 m^{2}) | September 3, 2000 | Gordon B. Hinckley |
| | 99 | Santo Domingo Dominican Republic Temple | Operating | 67,000 sq ft (6,225 m^{2}) | 6.42 acres (25,981 m^{2}) | 17 September 2000 | Gordon B. Hinckley |
| | 100 | Boston Massachusetts Temple | Operating | 69,600 sq ft (6,466 m^{2}) | 8 acres (32,375 m^{2}) | October 1, 2000 | Gordon B. Hinckley |
| | 101 | Recife Brazil Temple | Operating | 37,200 sq ft (3,456 m^{2}) | 5.59 acres (22,622 m^{2}) | 15 December 2000 | Gordon B. Hinckley |
| | 102 | Porto Alegre Brazil Temple | Operating | 10,700 sq ft (994 m^{2}) | 2 acres (8,094 m^{2}) | 17 December 2000 | Gordon B. Hinckley |
| | 103 | Montevideo Uruguay Temple | Operating | 10,700 sq ft (994 m^{2}) | 1.59 acres (6,435 m^{2}) | 18 March 2001 | Gordon B. Hinckley |
| | 104 | Winter Quarters Nebraska Temple | Operating | 16,000 sq ft (1,486 m^{2}) | 1.92 acres (7,770 m^{2}) | April 22, 2001 | Gordon B. Hinckley |
| | 105 | Guadalajara Mexico Temple | Operating | 10,700 sq ft (994 m^{2}) | 2.69 acres (10,886 m^{2}) | 29 April 2001 | Gordon B. Hinckley |
| | 106 | Perth Australia Temple | Operating | 10,700 sq ft (994 m^{2}) | 2.76 acres (11,169 m^{2}) | 20 May 2001 | Gordon B. Hinckley |
| | 107 | Columbia River Washington Temple | Operating | 16,880 sq ft (1,568 m^{2}) | 2.88 acres (11,655 m^{2}) | November 18, 2001 | Gordon B. Hinckley |
| | 108 | Snowflake Arizona Temple | Operating | 18,621 sq ft (1,730 m^{2}) | 7.5 acres (30,351 m^{2}) | March 3, 2002 | Gordon B. Hinckley |
| | 109 | Lubbock Texas Temple | Operating | 16,498 sq ft (1,533 m^{2}) | 2.7 acres (10,927 m^{2}) | April 21, 2002 | Gordon B. Hinckley |
| | 110 | Monterrey Mexico Temple | Operating | 16,498 sq ft (1,533 m^{2}) | 7.78 acres (31,485 m^{2}) | 28 April 2002 | Gordon B. Hinckley |
| | 111 | Campinas Brazil Temple | Operating | 49,100 sq ft (4,562 m^{2}) | 6.18 acres (25,010 m^{2}) | 17 May 2002 | Gordon B. Hinckley |
| | 112 | Asunción Paraguay Temple | Operating | 11,906 sq ft (1,106 m^{2}) | 1.13 acres (4,573 m^{2}) | 19 May 2002 | Gordon B. Hinckley |
| | 113 | Nauvoo Illinois Temple | Operating | 54,000 sq ft (5,017 m^{2}) | 3.3 acres (13,355 m^{2}) | June 27, 2002 | Gordon B. Hinckley |
| | 114 | The Hague Netherlands Temple | Operating | 14,477 sq ft (1,345 m^{2}) | 2.7 acres (10,927 m^{2}) | 8 September 2002 | Gordon B. Hinckley |
| | 115 | Brisbane Australia Temple | Operating | 10,700 sq ft (994 m^{2}) | 0.86 acres (3,480 m^{2}) | 15 June 2003 | Gordon B. Hinckley |
| | 116 | Redlands California Temple | Operating | 17,300 sq ft (1,607 m^{2}) | 4.6 acres (18,616 m^{2}) | September 14, 2003 | Gordon B. Hinckley |
| | 117 | Accra Ghana Temple | Operating | 17,500 sq ft (1,626 m^{2}) | 6 acres (24,281 m^{2}) | 11 January 2004 | Gordon B. Hinckley |
| | 118 | Copenhagen Denmark Temple | Operating | 25,000 sq ft (2,323 m^{2}) | 0.6 acres (2,428 m^{2}) | 23 May 2004 | Gordon B. Hinckley |
| | 119 | Manhattan New York Temple | Closed for renovation | 20,630 sq ft (1,917 m^{2}) | 0.3 acres (1,214 m^{2}) | June 13, 2004 | Gordon B. Hinckley |
| | 120 | San Antonio Texas Temple | Operating | 16,800 sq ft (1,561 m^{2}) | 5.5 acres (22,258 m^{2}) | May 22, 2005 | Gordon B. Hinckley |
| Map | 121 | Aba Nigeria Temple | Operating | 11,500 sq ft (1,068 m^{2}) | 6.3 acres (25,495 m^{2}) | 7 August 2005 | Gordon B. Hinckley |
| | 122 | Newport Beach California Temple | Operating | 17,800 sq ft (1,654 m^{2}) | 8.8 acres (35,612 m^{2}) | August 28, 2005 | Gordon B. Hinckley |
| | 123 | Sacramento California Temple | Operating | 19,500 sq ft (1,812 m^{2}) | 46 acres (186,155 m^{2}) | September 3, 2006 | Gordon B. Hinckley |
| | 124 | Helsinki Finland Temple | Operating | 16,350 sq ft (1,519 m^{2}) | 7.4 acres (29,947 m^{2}) | 22 October 2006 | Gordon B. Hinckley |
| | 125 | Rexburg Idaho Temple | Operating | 57,504 sq ft (5,342 m^{2}) | 10 acres (40,469 m^{2}) | February 10, 2008 | Thomas S. Monson |
| | 126 | Curitiba Brazil Temple | Operating | 27,850 sq ft (2,587 m^{2}) | 8.15 acres (32,982 m^{2}) | 1 June 2008 | Thomas S. Monson |
| | 127 | Panama City Panama Temple | Operating | 18,943 sq ft (1,760 m^{2}) | 6.96 acres (28,166 m^{2}) | 10 August 2008 | Thomas S. Monson |
| | 128 | Twin Falls Idaho Temple | Operating | 31,245 sq ft (2,903 m^{2}) | 9.1 acres (36,826 m^{2}) | August 24, 2008 | Thomas S. Monson |
| | 129 | Draper Utah Temple | Operating | 58,300 sq ft (5,416 m^{2}) | 12 acres (48,562 m^{2}) | March 20, 2009 | Thomas S. Monson |
| | 130 | Oquirrh Mountain Utah Temple | Operating | 60,000 sq ft (5,574 m^{2}) | 11 acres (44,515 m^{2}) | August 21, 2009 | Thomas S. Monson |
| | 131 | Vancouver British Columbia Temple | Operating | 28,165 sq ft (2,617 m^{2}) | 11.6 acres (46,944 m^{2}) | 2 May 2010 | Thomas S. Monson |
| | 132 | Gila Valley Arizona Temple | Operating | 18,561 sq ft (1,724 m^{2}) | 17 acres (68,797 m^{2}) | May 23, 2010 | Thomas S. Monson |
| | 133 | Cebu City Philippines Temple | Operating | 29,556 sq ft (2,746 m^{2}) | 11.6 acres (46,944 m^{2}) | 13 June 2010 | Thomas S. Monson |
| | 134 | Kyiv Ukraine Temple | Operating | 22,184 sq ft (2,061 m^{2}) | 12.35 acres (49,979 m^{2}) | 29 August 2010 | Thomas S. Monson |
| | 135 | San Salvador El Salvador Temple | Operating | 27,986 sq ft (2,600 m^{2}) | 6.5 acres (26,305 m^{2}) | 21 August 2011 | Henry B. Eyring |
| | 136 | Quetzaltenango Guatemala Temple | Operating | 21,085 sq ft (1,959 m^{2}) | 6.47 acres (26,183 m^{2}) | 11 December 2011 | Dieter F. Uchtdorf |
| | 137 | Kansas City Missouri Temple | Operating | 32,000 sq ft (2,973 m^{2}) | 8.05 acres (32,577 m^{2}) | May 6, 2012 | Thomas S. Monson |
| | 138 | Manaus Brazil Temple | Operating | 32,032 sq ft (2,976 m^{2}) | 7.7 acres (31,161 m^{2}) | 10 June 2012 | Dieter F. Uchtdorf |
| | 139 | Brigham City Utah Temple | Operating | 36,000 sq ft (3,345 m^{2}) | 3.14 acres (12,707 m^{2}) | September 23, 2012 | Boyd K. Packer |
| | 140 | Calgary Alberta Temple | Operating | 33,000 sq ft (3,066 m^{2}) | 10.17 acres (41,157 m^{2}) | 28 October 2012 | Thomas S. Monson |
| Map | 141 | Tegucigalpa Honduras Temple | Operating | 28,254 sq ft (2,625 m^{2}) | 13.6 acres (55,037 m^{2}) | 17 March 2013 | Dieter F. Uchtdorf |
| | 142 | Gilbert Arizona Temple | Operating | 85,326 sq ft (7,927 m^{2}) | 15.38 acres (62,241 m^{2}) | March 2, 2014 | Henry B. Eyring & Thomas S. Monson |
| | 143 | Fort Lauderdale Florida Temple | Operating | 30,500 sq ft (2,834 m^{2}) | 16.82 acres (68,068 m^{2}) | May 4, 2014 | Dieter F. Uchtdorf |
| | 144 | Phoenix Arizona Temple | Operating | 64,870 sq ft (6,027 m^{2}) | 5.19 acres (21,003 m^{2}) | November 16, 2014 | Thomas S. Monson |
| Map | 145 | Córdoba Argentina Temple | Operating | 34,369 sq ft (3,193 m^{2}) | 5.18 acres (20,963 m^{2}) | 17 May 2015 | Dieter F. Uchtdorf |
| | 146 | Payson Utah Temple | Operating | 96,630 sq ft (8,977 m^{2}) | 10.63 acres (43,018 m^{2}) | June 7, 2015 | Henry B. Eyring |
| | 147 | Trujillo Peru Temple | Operating | 28,200 sq ft (2,620 m^{2}) | 8.9 acres (36,017 m^{2}) | 21 June 2015 | Dieter F. Uchtdorf |
| | 148 | Indianapolis Indiana Temple | Operating | 34,000 sq ft (3,159 m^{2}) | 18.11 acres (73,289 m^{2}) | August 23, 2015 | Henry B. Eyring |
| | 149 | Tijuana Mexico Temple | Operating | 33,367 sq ft (3,100 m^{2}) | 9.4 acres (38,040 m^{2}) | 13 December 2015 | Dieter F. Uchtdorf |
| | 150 | Provo City Center Temple | Operating | 85,084 sq ft (7,905 m^{2}) | 5.6 acres (22,662 m^{2}) | March 20, 2016 | Dallin H. Oaks |
| | 151 | Sapporo Japan Temple | Operating | 48,480 sq ft (4,504 m^{2}) | 9.8 acres (39,659 m^{2}) | 21 August 2016 | Russell M. Nelson |
| | 152 | Philadelphia Pennsylvania Temple | Operating | 61,466 sq ft (5,710 m^{2}) | 1.6 acres (6,475 m^{2}) | September 18, 2016 | Henry B. Eyring |
| | 153 | Fort Collins Colorado Temple | Operating | 42,000 sq ft (3,902 m^{2}) | 15.69 acres (63,495 m^{2}) | October 16, 2016 | Dieter F. Uchtdorf |
| | 154 | Star Valley Wyoming Temple | Operating | 18,609 sq ft (1,729 m^{2}) | 43.6 acres (176,443 m^{2}) | October 30, 2016 | David A. Bednar |
| | 155 | Hartford Connecticut Temple | Operating | 32,246 sq ft (2,996 m^{2}) | 11.3 acres (45,729 m^{2}) | November 20, 2016 | Henry B. Eyring |
| | 156 | Paris France Temple | Operating | 44,175 sq ft (4,104 m^{2}) | 2.26 acres (9,146 m^{2}) | 21 May 2017 | Henry B. Eyring |
| | 157 | Tucson Arizona Temple | Operating | 38,216 sq ft (3,550 m^{2}) | 7 acres (28,328 m^{2}) | August 13, 2017 | Dieter F. Uchtdorf |
| | 158 | Meridian Idaho Temple | Operating | 67,331 sq ft (6,255 m^{2}) | 15.73 acres (63,657 m^{2}) | November 19, 2017 | Dieter F. Uchtdorf |
| | 159 | Cedar City Utah Temple | Operating | 42,657 sq ft (3,963 m^{2}) | 9.5 acres (38,445 m^{2}) | December 10, 2017 | Henry B. Eyring |
| Map | 160 | Concepción Chile Temple | Operating | 23,095 sq ft (2,146 m^{2}) | 4.06 acres (16,430 m^{2}) | 28 October 2018 | Russell M. Nelson |
| Map | 161 | Barranquilla Colombia Temple | Operating | 25,349 sq ft (2,355 m^{2}) | 5.93 acres (23,998 m^{2}) | 9 December 2018 | Dallin H. Oaks |
| | 162 | Rome Italy Temple | Operating | 41,010 sq ft (3,810 m^{2}) | 14.5 acres (58,679 m^{2}) | 10 March 2019 | Russell M. Nelson |
| Map | 163 | Kinshasa Democratic Republic of the Congo Temple | Operating | 12,000 sq ft (1,115 m^{2}) | 5 acres (20,234 m^{2}) | 14 April 2019 | Dale G. Renlund |
| | 164 | Fortaleza Brazil Temple | Operating | 36,000 sq ft (3,345 m^{2}) | 10 acres (40,469 m^{2}) | 2 June 2019 | Ulisses Soares |
| | 165 | Port-au-Prince Haiti Temple | Operating | 10,396 sq ft (966 m^{2}) | 1.77 acres (7,163 m^{2}) | 1 September 2019 | David A. Bednar |
| | 166 | Lisbon Portugal Temple | Operating | 23,730 sq ft (2,205 m^{2}) | 4.6 acres (18,616 m^{2}) | 15 September 2019 | Neil L. Andersen |
| | 167 | Arequipa Peru Temple | Operating | 26,969 sq ft (2,506 m^{2}) | 7.91 acres (32,011 m^{2}) | 15 December 2019 | Ulisses Soares |
| | 168 | Durban South Africa Temple | Operating | 19,860 sq ft (1,845 m^{2}) | 14.49 acres (58,639 m^{2}) | 16 February 2020 | Ronald A. Rasband |
| | 169 | Winnipeg Manitoba Temple | Operating | 16,100 sq ft (1,496 m^{2}) | 7.7 acres (31,161 m^{2}) | 31 October 2021 | Gerrit W. Gong |
| | 170 | Pocatello Idaho Temple | Operating | 71,125 sq ft (6,608 m^{2}) | 10.94 acres (44,273 m^{2}) | 7 November 2021 | M. Russell Ballard |
| Map | 171 | Rio de Janeiro Brazil Temple | Operating | 29,966 sq ft (2,784 m^{2}) | 9.44 acres (38,202 m^{2}) | 8 May 2022 | Gary E. Stevenson |
| | 172 | Yigo Guam Temple | Operating | 6,861 sq ft (637 m^{2}) | 5.8 acres (23,472 m^{2}) | 22 May 2022 | David A. Bednar |
| Map | 173 | Praia Cape Verde Temple | Operating | 8,759 sq ft (814 m^{2}) | 4.46 acres (18,049 m^{2}) | 19 June 2022 | Neil L. Andersen |
| Map | 174 | Belém Brazil Temple | Operating | 28,675 sq ft (2,664 m^{2}) | 6.7 acres (27,114 m^{2}) | 20 November 2022 | Dale G. Renlund |
| | 175 | Quito Ecuador Temple | Operating | 36,780 sq ft (3,417 m^{2}) | 3.96 acres (16,026 m^{2}) | 20 November 2022 | Quentin L. Cook |
| Map | 176 | San Juan Puerto Rico Temple | Operating | 6,988 sq ft (649 m^{2}) | 2.97 acres (12,019 m^{2}) | 15 January 2023 | D. Todd Christofferson |
| | 177 | Richmond Virginia Temple | Operating | 39,202 sq ft (3,642 m^{2}) | 12 acres (48,562 m^{2}) | 7 May 2023 | Dallin H. Oaks |
| | 178 | Helena Montana Temple | Operating | 9,794 sq ft (910 m^{2}) | 4.75 acres (19,223 m^{2}) | 18 June 2023 | Gary E. Stevenson |
| | 179 | Saratoga Springs Utah Temple | Operating | 97,836 sq ft (9,089 m^{2}) | 22.71 acres (91,904 m^{2}) | 13 August 2023 | Henry B. Eyring |
| Map | 180 | Brasília Brazil Temple | Operating | 25,000 sq ft (2,323 m^{2}) | 6 acres (24,281 m^{2}) | 17 September 2023 | Neil L. Andersen |
| | 181 | Bentonville Arkansas Temple | Operating | 28,472 sq ft (2,645 m^{2}) | 18.62 acres (75,352 m^{2}) | 17 September 2023 | David A. Bednar |
| | 182 | Moses Lake Washington Temple | Operating | 28,933 sq ft (2,688 m^{2}) | 17.2 acres (69,606 m^{2}) | 17 September 2023 | Quentin L. Cook |
| Map | 183 | McAllen Texas Temple | Operating | 27,897 sq ft (2,592 m^{2}) | 10.61 acres (42,937 m^{2}) | 8 October 2023 | Dieter F. Uchtdorf |
| Map | 184 | Feather River California Temple | Operating | 41,665 sq ft (3,871 m^{2}) | 9.24 acres (37,393 m^{2}) | 8 October 2023 | Ulisses Soares |
| | 185 | Bangkok Thailand Temple | Operating | 48,525 sq ft (4,508 m^{2}) | 1.77 acres (7,163 m^{2}) | 22 October 2023 | Ronald A. Rasband |
| | 186 | Okinawa Japan Temple | Temporarily closed | 12,437 sq ft (1,155 m^{2}) | 0.55 acres (2,226 m^{2}) | | |
| | 187 | Lima Peru Los Olivos Temple | Operating | 47,413 sq ft (4,405 m^{2}) | 2.46 acres (9,955 m^{2}) | 14 January 2024 | D. Todd Christofferson |
| | 188 | Orem Utah Temple | Operating | 71,998 sq ft (6,689 m^{2}) | 15.39 acres (62,281 m^{2}) | 21 January 2024 | D. Todd Christofferson |
| | 189 | Red Cliffs Utah Temple | Operating | 96,277 sq ft (8,944 m^{2}) | 15.31 acres (61,957 m^{2}) | 24 March 2024 | Henry B. Eyring |
| | 190 | Urdaneta Philippines Temple | Operating | 32,604 sq ft (3,029 m^{2}) | 15.34 acres (62,079 m^{2}) | 28 April 2024 | Dallin H. Oaks |
| Map | 191 | Puebla Mexico Temple | Operating | 35,861 sq ft (3,332 m^{2}) | 6.81 acres (27,559 m^{2}) | 19 May 2024 | Gerrit W. Gong |
| | 192 | Taylorsville Utah Temple | Operating | 73,492 sq ft (6,828 m^{2}) | 7.5 acres (30,351 m^{2}) | 2 June 2024 | Gerrit W. Gong |
| Map | 193 | Cobán Guatemala Temple | Operating | 8,772 sq ft (815 m^{2}) | 2.1 acres (8,498 m^{2}) | 9 June 2024 | Dale G. Renlund |
| Map | 194 | Salta Argentina Temple | Operating | 27,000 sq ft (2,508 m^{2}) | 17.72 acres (71,710 m^{2}) | 16 June 2024 | D. Todd Christofferson |
| | 195 | Layton Utah Temple | Operating | 93,539 sq ft (8,690 m^{2}) | 11.8 acres (47,753 m^{2}) | 16 June 2024 | David A. Bednar |
| | 196 | Pittsburgh Pennsylvania Temple | Operating | 32,240 sq ft (2,995 m^{2}) | 5.8 acres (23,472 m^{2}) | 15 September 2024 | Dieter F. Uchtdorf |
| Map | 197 | Mendoza Argentina Temple | Operating | 21,999 sq ft (2,044 m^{2}) | 15 acres (60,703 m^{2}) | 22 September 2024 | Ronald A. Rasband |
| Map | 198 | San Pedro Sula Honduras Temple | Operating | 35,818 sq ft (3,328 m^{2}) | 9 acres (36,422 m^{2}) | 13 October 2024 | Dale G. Renlund |
| Map | 199 | Salvador Brazil Temple | Operating | 29,963 sq ft (2,784 m^{2}) | 4.6 acres (18,616 m^{2}) | 20 October 2024 | Neil L. Andersen |
| | 200 | Deseret Peak Utah Temple | Operating | 71,998 sq ft (6,689 m^{2}) | 15.5 acres (62,726 m^{2}) | 10 November 2024 | Russell M. Nelson |
| Map | 201 | Casper Wyoming Temple | Operating | 9,950 sq ft (924 m^{2}) | 9.52 acres (38,526 m^{2}) | 24 November 2024 | Quentin L. Cook |
| | 202 | Tallahassee Florida Temple | Operating | 29,225 sq ft (2,715 m^{2}) | 4.97 acres (20,113 m^{2}) | 8 December 2024 | Patrick Kearon |
| | 203 | Auckland New Zealand Temple | Operating | 45,456 sq ft (4,223 m^{2}) | 11.37 acres (46,013 m^{2}) | 13 April 2025 | Patrick Kearon |
| Map | 204 | Nairobi Kenya Temple | Operating | 19,870 sq ft (1,846 m^{2}) | 3.435 acres (13,901 m^{2}) | 18 May 2025 | Ulisses Soares |
| Map | 205 | Abidjan Ivory Coast Temple | Operating | 17,362 sq ft (1,613 m^{2}) | 3.23 acres (13,071 m^{2}) | 25 May 2025 | Ronald A. Rasband |
| | 206 | Syracuse Utah Temple | Operating | 90,526 sq ft (8,410 m^{2}) | 12.268 acres (49,647 m^{2}) | 8 June 2025 | Russell M. Nelson |
| Map | 207 | Antofagasta Chile Temple | Operating | 26,163 sq ft (2,431 m^{2}) | 2 acres (8,094 m^{2}) | 15 June 2025 | Gary E. Stevenson |
| Map | 208 | Farmington New Mexico Temple | Operating | 29,066 sq ft (2,700 m^{2}) | 6.63 acres (26,831 m^{2}) | 17 August 2025 | Neil L. Andersen |
| | 209 | Elko Nevada Temple | Operating | 12,901 sq ft (1,199 m^{2}) | 5.2 acres (21,044 m^{2}) | 12 October 2025 | Gary E. Stevenson |
| Map | 210 | Grand Junction Colorado Temple | Operating | 29,630 sq ft (2,753 m^{2}) | 7.93 acres (32,092 m^{2}) | 19 October 2025 | Jeffrey R. Holland |
| Map | 211 | Bahía Blanca Argentina Temple | Operating | 23,400 sq ft (2,174 m^{2}) | 8 acres (32,375 m^{2}) | 23 November 2025 | Ulisses Soares |
| Map | 212 | Burley Idaho Temple | Operating | 45,300 sq ft (4,209 m^{2}) | 10.12 acres (40,954 m^{2}) | 11 January 2026 | Dallin H. Oaks |
| Map | 213 | Alabang Philippines Temple | Operating | 35,998 sq ft (3,344 m^{2}) | 2.62 acres (10,603 m^{2}) | 18 January 2026 | David A. Bednar |
| Map | 214 | Harare Zimbabwe Temple | Operating | 17,250 sq ft (1,603 m^{2}) | 6.7 acres (27,114 m^{2}) | 1 March 2026 | Gerrit W. Gong |
| Map | 215 | Davao Philippines Temple | Operating | 18,450 sq ft (1,714 m^{2}) | 2.7 acres (10,927 m^{2}) | 3 May 2026 | Dale G. Renlund |
| | 216 | Lindon Utah Temple | Operating | 83,140 sq ft (7,724 m^{2}) | 12.63 acres (51,112 m^{2}) | 3 May 2026 | Henry B. Eyring |
| | 217 | Bacolod Philippines Temple | Operating | 27,895 sq ft (2,592 m^{2}) | 12.3 acres (49,776 m^{2}) | 31 May 2026 | Neil L. Andersen |
| Map | 218 | Yorba Linda California Temple | Operating | 30,872 sq ft (2,868 m^{2}) | 5.46 acres (22,096 m^{2}) | 7 June 2026 | D. Todd Christofferson |
| | 219 | Willamette Valley Oregon Temple | Operating | 30,635 sq ft (2,846 m^{2}) | 10.29 acres (41,642 m^{2}) | 7 June 2026 | Dieter F. Uchtdorf |
| Map | 220 | Belo Horizonte Brazil Temple | Operating | 28,686 sq ft (2,665 m^{2}) | 6.029 acres (24,398 m^{2}) | 16 August 2026 | Dallin H. Oaks |
| | 221 | Cleveland Ohio Temple | Operating | 9,950 sq ft (924 m^{2}) | 11.04 acres (44,677 m^{2}) | 16 August 2026 | David A. Bednar |
| Map | 222 | Phnom Penh Cambodia Temple | Operating | 9,946 sq ft (924 m^{2}) | 3.2 acres (12,950 m^{2}) | 30 August 2026 | Patrick Kearon |
| Map | 223 | Ephraim Utah Temple | Operating | 41,680 sq ft (3,872 m^{2}) | 9.16 acres (37,069 m^{2}) | 11 October 2026 | Ronald A. Rasband |
| Map | 224 | Miraflores Guatemala City Guatemala Temple | Operating | 30,000 sq ft (2,787 m^{2}) | 1.5 acres (6,070 m^{2}) | 11 October 2026 | Gerrit W. Gong |
| Map | 225 | Montpelier Idaho Temple | Operating | 34,730 sq ft (3,227 m^{2}) | 2.6 acres (10,522 m^{2}) | 18 October 2026 | Henry B. Eyring |
| Map | 226 | Managua Nicaragua Temple | Operating | 24,500 sq ft (2,276 m^{2}) | 8.9 acres (36,017 m^{2}) | 18 October 2026 | Ronald A. Rasband |
| Map | 227 | Cody Wyoming Temple | Operating | 9,950 sq ft (924 m^{2}) | 4.69 acres (18,980 m^{2}) | 25 October 2026 | Clark G. Gilbert |
| Map | 228 | San Luis Potosí Mexico Temple | Operating | 9,300 sq ft (864 m^{2}) | 3.9 acres (15,783 m^{2}) | 1 November 2026 | Dale G. Renlund |
| | 229 | Wichita Kansas Temple | Operating | 9,950 sq ft (924 m^{2}) | 6.4 acres (25,900 m^{2}) | 1 November 2026 | Patrick Kearon |

=== Dedication scheduled ===
Temples scheduled for dedication are ordered by announced date and time (earliest to most recent). If two or more have dedications at the same scheduled time (GMT), those temples are listed in alphabetical order.

| Image | Nº | Name | Status | Area | | Dedication Scheduled | |
| Image | Nº | Name | Status | Floor | Site | Date | by |
|---|---|---|---|---|---|---|---|
| Map | 230 | Torreón Mexico Temple | Dedication scheduled | 11,324 sq ft (1,052 m^{2}) | 2.2 acres (8,903 m^{2}) | 22 November 2026 | Gary E. Stevenson |
| | 231 | Modesto California Temple | Dedication scheduled | 31,352 sq ft (2,913 m^{2}) | 17.63 acres (71,346 m^{2}) | 22 November 2026 | Quentin L. Cook |
| Map | 232 | Pago Pago American Samoa Temple | Dedication scheduled | 17,000 sq ft (1,579 m^{2}) | 1.71 acres (6,920 m^{2}) | 13 December 2026 | Quentin L. Cook |
| Map | 233 | Fort Worth Texas Temple | Dedication scheduled | 29,630 sq ft (2,753 m^{2}) | 9.3 acres (37,636 m^{2}) | 10 January 2027 | TBA |
| Map | 234 | Knoxville Tennessee Temple | Dedication scheduled | 30,000 sq ft (2,787 m^{2}) | 4.99 acres (20,194 m^{2}) | 7 March 2027 | David A. Bednar |
| | 235 | Smithfield Utah Temple | Dedication scheduled | 83,000 sq ft (7,711 m^{2}) | 13.3 acres (53,823 m^{2}) | 18 April 2027 | Quentin L. Cook |

=== Under construction ===
Temples under construction are listed by groundbreaking date and time (earliest to most recent). If two or more groundbreakings occurred at the same scheduled time (GMT), they are listed in alphabetical order.

| Image | Nº | Name | Status | Area | | Groundbreaking | |
| Image | Nº | Name | Status | Floor | Site | Date | by |
|---|---|---|---|---|---|---|---|
| | 236 | Bengaluru India Temple | Under construction | 38,670 sq ft (3,593 m^{2}) | 1.62 acres (6,556 m^{2}) | 2 December 2020 | Robert K. William |
| Map | 237 | Neiafu Tonga Temple | Under construction | 17,000 sq ft (1,579 m^{2}) | 4.81 acres (19,465 m^{2}) | 11 September 2021 | ‘Inoke F. Kupu |
| Map | 238 | Freetown Sierra Leone Temple | Under construction | 18,000 sq ft (1,672 m^{2}) | 2.9 acres (11,736 m^{2}) | 19 March 2022 | Hugo E. Martinez |
| Map | 239 | Lubumbashi Democratic Republic of the Congo Temple | Under construction | 19,300 sq ft (1,793 m^{2}) | 2.57 acres (10,400 m^{2}) | 20 August 2022 | Matthew L. Carpenter |
| Map | 240 | Heber Valley Utah Temple | Under construction | 88,000 sq ft (8,175 m^{2}) | 17.9 acres (72,439 m^{2}) | 8 October 2022 | Russell M. Nelson |
| Map | 241 | Querétaro Mexico Temple | Under construction | 27,500 sq ft (2,555 m^{2}) | 3.58 acres (14,488 m^{2}) | 7 January 2023 | Adrian Ochoa |
| Map | 242 | Port Vila Vanuatu Temple | Under construction | 10,000 sq ft (929 m^{2}) | 1.62 acres (6,556 m^{2}) | 8 April 2023 | K. Brett Nattress |
| Map | 243 | Port Moresby Papua New Guinea Temple | Under construction | 9,550 sq ft (887 m^{2}) | 4.45 acres (18,009 m^{2}) | 22 April 2023 | Peter F. Meurs |
| Map | 244 | Kaohsiung Taiwan Temple | Under construction | 10,900 sq ft (1,013 m^{2}) | 1.26 acres (5,099 m^{2}) | 23 November 2023 | Benjamin M. Z. Tai |
| Map | 245 | Teton River Idaho Temple | Under construction | 100,000 sq ft (9,290 m^{2}) | 16.6 acres (67,178 m^{2}) | 1 June 2024 | Ricardo P. Giménez |
| Map | 246 | Santa Cruz Bolivia Temple | Under construction | 29,000 sq ft (2,694 m^{2}) | 5.24 acres (21,206 m^{2}) | 8 June 2024 | Jorge F. Zeballos |
| Map | 247 | Ribeirão Preto Brazil Temple | Under construction | 32,000 sq ft (2,973 m^{2}) | 8.77 acres (35,491 m^{2}) | 22 June 2024 | Joni L. Koch |
| Map | 248 | Londrina Brazil Temple | Under construction | 32,000 sq ft (2,973 m^{2}) | 6.23 acres (25,212 m^{2}) | 17 August 2024 | Ciro Schmiel |
| Map | 249 | Santiago West Chile Temple | Under construction | 12,500 sq ft (1,161 m^{2}) | 2.4 acres (9,712 m^{2}) | 17 August 2024 | Alan R. Walker |
| Map | 250 | Austin Texas Temple | Under construction | 30,000 sq ft (2,787 m^{2}) | 10.6 acres (42,897 m^{2}) | 17 August 2024 | Michael A. Dunn |
| Map | 251 | Cagayan de Oro Philippines Temple | Under construction | 18,449 sq ft (1,714 m^{2}) | 4.9 acres (19,830 m^{2}) | 31 August 2024 | Carlos G. Revillo Jr. |
| Map | 252 | Tarawa Kiribati Temple | Under construction | 10,000 sq ft (929 m^{2}) | 0.8 acres (3,237 m^{2}) | 2 November 2024 | Jeremy R. Jaggi |
| Map | 253 | Grand Rapids Michigan Temple | Under construction | 20,123 sq ft (1,869 m^{2}) | 10.32 acres (41,764 m^{2}) | 7 December 2024 | Mathias Held |
| Map | 254 | Tacloban City Philippines Temple | Under construction | 21,407 sq ft (1,989 m^{2}) | 6.99 acres (28,288 m^{2}) | 18 January 2025 | Michael B. Strong |
| Map | 255 | Cali Colombia Temple | Under construction | 9,500 sq ft (883 m^{2}) | 3.14 acres (12,707 m^{2}) | 1 March 2025 | Jorge T. Becerra |
| Map | 256 | Antananarivo Madagascar Temple | Under construction | 10,000 sq ft (929 m^{2}) | 9.8 acres (39,659 m^{2}) | 15 March 2025 | Denelson Silva |
| Map | 257 | Birmingham England Temple | Under construction | 10,800 sq ft (1,003 m^{2}) | 2.7 acres (10,927 m^{2}) | 22 March 2025 | Scott D. Whiting |
| Map | 258 | Lethbridge Alberta Temple | Under construction | 45,000 sq ft (4,181 m^{2}) | 9 acres (36,422 m^{2}) | 26 April 2025 | Randall K. Bennett |
| Map | 259 | Lagos Nigeria Temple | Under construction | 19,800 sq ft (1,839 m^{2}) | 2.7 acres (10,927 m^{2}) | 10 May 2025 | Alfred Kyungu |
| Map | 260 | Natal Brazil Temple | Under construction | 19,800 sq ft (1,839 m^{2}) | 5.53 acres (22,379 m^{2}) | 17 May 2025 | Mark D. Eddy |
| Map | 261 | Benin City Nigeria Temple | Under construction | 30,700 sq ft (2,852 m^{2}) | 2.17 acres (8,782 m^{2}) | 24 May 2025 | Adeyinka A. Ojediran |
| Map | 262 | Budapest Hungary Temple | Under construction | 18,000 sq ft (1,672 m^{2}) | 5.92 acres (23,957 m^{2}) | 21 June 2025 | Ruben V. Alliaud |
| Map | 263 | Singapore Temple | Under construction | 18,000 sq ft (1,672 m^{2}) | 1 acre (4,047 m^{2}) | 28 June 2025 | Kelly R. Johnson |
| Map | 264 | Wellington New Zealand Temple | Under construction | 14,900 sq ft (1,384 m^{2}) | 3.35 acres (13,557 m^{2}) | 2 August 2025 | Taniela B. Wakolo |
| Map | 265 | Winchester Virginia Temple | Under construction | 30,000 sq ft (2,787 m^{2}) | 11.27 acres (45,608 m^{2}) | 9 August 2025 | Robert M. Daines |
| Map | 266 | Brazzaville Republic of the Congo Temple | Under construction | 10,000 sq ft (929 m^{2}) | 1.5 acres (6,070 m^{2}) | 23 August 2025 | Thierry K. Mutombo |
| Map | 267 | Tampa Florida Temple | Under construction | 29,000 sq ft (2,694 m^{2}) | 12 acres (48,562 m^{2}) | 23 August 2025 | Neil L. Andersen |
| | 268 | Vancouver Washington Temple | Under construction | 43,000 sq ft (3,995 m^{2}) | 15.11 acres (61,148 m^{2}) | 23 August 2025 | Mark A. Bragg |
| Map | 269 | Lone Mountain Nevada Temple | Under construction | 70,194 sq ft (6,521 m^{2}) | 19.8 acres (80,128 m^{2}) | 25 September 2025 | Michael A. Dunn |
| | 270 | Fairbanks Alaska Temple | Under construction | 10,000 sq ft (929 m^{2}) | 7.59 acres (30,716 m^{2}) | 27 September 2025 | Peter M. Johnson |
| Map | 271 | Kumasi Ghana Temple | Under construction | 22,750 sq ft (2,114 m^{2}) | 2.08 acres (8,417 m^{2}) | 18 October 2025 | Isaac K. Morrison |
| Map | 272 | Cape Town South Africa Temple | Under construction | 9,500 sq ft (883 m^{2}) | 3.79 acres (15,338 m^{2}) | 25 October 2025 | Carlos A. Godoy |
| Map | 273 | Brussels Belgium Temple | Under construction | 25,500 sq ft (2,369 m^{2}) | 0.3 acres (1,214 m^{2}) | 22 November 2025 | Jack N. Gerard |
| Map | 274 | Jacksonville Florida Temple | Under construction | 29,000 sq ft (2,694 m^{2}) | 6.6 acres (26,709 m^{2}) | 24 January 2026 | Massimo De Feo |
| Map | 275 | João Pessoa Brazil Temple | Under construction | 18,850 sq ft (1,751 m^{2}) | 3.9 acres (15,783 m^{2}) | 24 January 2026 | Joni L. Koch |
| Map | 276 | Fairview Texas Temple | Under construction | 30,742 sq ft (2,856 m^{2}) | 8.16 acres (33,022 m^{2}) | 21 February 2026 | Jonathan S. Schmitt |
| Map | 277 | Huehuetenango Guatemala Temple | Under construction | 10,787 sq ft (1,002 m^{2}) | 3.4 acres (13,759 m^{2}) | 14 March 2026 | Patricio M. Giuffra |
| Map | 278 | Teresina Brazil Temple | Under construction | 25,420 sq ft (2,362 m^{2}) | 3.6 acres (14,569 m^{2}) | 18 April 2026 | Ciro Schmeil |
| Map | 279 | Springfield Missouri Temple | Under construction | 29,000 sq ft (2,694 m^{2}) | 38 acres (153,781 m^{2}) | 6 June 2026 | Aroldo B. Cavalcante |
| Map | 280 | Missoula Montana Temple | Under construction | 19,000 sq ft (1,765 m^{2}) | 5.08 acres (20,558 m^{2}) | 6 June 2026 | Jose A. Teixeira |
| Map | 281 | Santos Brazil Temple | Under construction | 23,000 sq ft (2,137 m^{2}) | 1.1 acres (4,452 m^{2}) | 1 August 2026 | Ronald M. Barcellos |
| Map | 282 | Naga Philippines Temple | Under construction | 18,850 sq ft (1,751 m^{2}) | 9.11 acres (36,867 m^{2}) | 8 August 2026 | Steven D. Shumway |
| Map | 283 | Huntsville Alabama Temple | Under construction | 22,681 sq ft (2,107 m^{2}) | 10.97 acres (44,394 m^{2}) | 15 August 2026 | John D. Amos |
| Map | 284 | Tulsa Oklahoma Temple | Under construction | 29,600 sq ft (2,750 m^{2}) | 25.7 acres (104,004 m^{2}) | 22 August 2026 | Pedro X. Larreal |
| | 285 | Victoria British Columbia Temple | Under construction | 11,400 sq ft (1,059 m^{2}) | 4.7 acres (19,020 m^{2}) | 22 August 2026 | James E. Evanson |
| Map | 286 | Coeur d'Alene Idaho Temple | Under construction | 29,630 sq ft (2,753 m^{2}) | 10.91 acres (44,151 m^{2}) | 29 August 2026 | Hutch U. Fale |
| Map | 287 | Colorado Springs Colorado Temple | Under construction | 45,000 sq ft (4,181 m^{2}) | 18.6 acres (75,272 m^{2}) | 12 September 2026 | Karl D. Hirst |
| Map | 288 | Barcelona Spain Temple | Under construction | 27,500 sq ft (2,555 m^{2}) | 5.4 acres (21,853 m^{2}) | 19 September 2026 | James W. McConkie III |
| Map | 289 | Iquitos Peru Temple | Under construction | 20,000 sq ft (1,858 m^{2}) | 1.75 acres (7,082 m^{2}) | 10 October 2026 | Sandino Roman |
| Map | 290 | Maceió Brazil Temple | Under construction | 19,000 sq ft (1,765 m^{2}) | 3 acres (12,141 m^{2}) | 10 October 2026 | B. Corey Cuvelier |
| Map | 291 | Vienna Austria Temple | Under construction | 15,300 sq ft (1,421 m^{2}) | 0.8 acres (3,237 m^{2}) | 17 October 2026 | Michael Cziesla |
| Map | 292 | Cincinnati Ohio Temple | Under construction | 29,630 sq ft (2,753 m^{2}) | 35 acres (141,640 m^{2}) | 7 November 2026 | Alan T. Phillips |
| Map | 293 | Piura Peru Temple | Groundbreaking scheduled | 18,850 sq ft (1,751 m^{2}) | 2.6 acres (10,522 m^{2}) | 14 November 2026 | Steven C. Barlow |
| Map | 294 | Cuernavaca Mexico Temple | Groundbreaking scheduled | 19,000 sq ft (1,765 m^{2}) | 5.36 acres (21,691 m^{2}) | 14 November 2026 | Moisés Villanueva |

=== Groundbreaking scheduled ===
Temples scheduled for groundbreaking are listed by scheduled date. If more than one groundbreaking is set for the same date, the temples are ordered by time zone, from east to west starting at the international date line. When two or more temples are on the same date and in the same time zone, they are listed in chronological order (by the time of day the groundbreaking(s) occur).

| Image | Nº | Name | Status | Area | | Groundbreaking scheduled | |
| Image | Nº | Name | Status | Floor | Site | Date | by |
|---|---|---|---|---|---|---|---|
| Map | 295 | La Paz Bolivia Temple | Groundbreaking scheduled | 18,850 sq ft (1,751 m^{2}) | 3.8 acres (15,378 m^{2}) | 21 November 2026 | Juan Pablo Villar |
| Map | 296 | Eket Nigeria Temple | Groundbreaking scheduled | 18,850 sq ft (1,751 m^{2}) | 7 acres (28,328 m^{2}) | 28 November 2026 | D. Martin Goury |
| Map | 297 | Calabar Nigeria Temple | Groundbreaking scheduled | 26,000 sq ft (2,415 m^{2}) | 7 acres (28,328 m^{2}) | 5 December 2026 | Christian C. Chigbundu |
| Map | 298 | Viña del Mar Chile Temple | Groundbreaking scheduled | 30,000 sq ft (2,787 m^{2}) | 1.87 acres (7,568 m^{2}) | 5 December 2026 | Sergio R. Vargas |
| Map | 299 | Lehi Utah Temple | Groundbreaking scheduled | 85,000 sq ft (7,897 m^{2}) | 22.48 acres (90,973 m^{2}) | 5 December 2026 | John A. McCune |

=== Announced ===
Temples are listed by the date they were announced. If multiple temples were announced on the same day, they are listed in the order announced.

| Image | Nº | Name | Status | Area | | Announced | |
| Image | Nº | Name | Status | Floor | Site | Date | by |
|---|---|---|---|---|---|---|---|
| | 300 | Russia Temple | Announced | | | 1 April 2018 | Russell M. Nelson |
| | 301 | Dubai United Arab Emirates Temple | Announced | | | 5 April 2020 | Russell M. Nelson |
| | 302 | Shanghai People's Republic of China Temple | Announced | | | 5 April 2020 | Russell M. Nelson |
| Map | 303 | São Paulo East Brazil Temple | Site announced | 46,050 sq ft (4,278 m^{2}) | 10.7 acres (43,301 m^{2}) | 4 October 2020 | Russell M. Nelson |
| Map | 304 | Oslo Norway Temple | Site announced | 10,800 sq ft (1,003 m^{2}) | 8 acres (32,375 m^{2}) | 4 April 2021 | Russell M. Nelson |
| Map | 305 | Beira Mozambique Temple | Site announced | 10,000 sq ft (929 m^{2}) | 2.5 acres (10,117 m^{2}) | 4 April 2021 | Russell M. Nelson |
| | 306 | Monrovia Liberia Temple | Announced | | | 3 October 2021 | Russell M. Nelson |
| Map | 307 | Kananga Democratic Republic of the Congo Temple | Site announced | 11,000 sq ft (1,022 m^{2}) | 1.6 acres (6,475 m^{2}) | 3 October 2021 | Russell M. Nelson |
| Map | 308 | Culiacán Mexico Temple | Site announced | 10,000 sq ft (929 m^{2}) | 5 acres (20,234 m^{2}) | 3 October 2021 | Russell M. Nelson |
| Map | 309 | Vitória Brazil Temple | Site announced | 10,600 sq ft (985 m^{2}) | 0.75 acres (3,035 m^{2}) | 3 October 2021 | Russell M. Nelson |
| Map | 310 | Cusco Peru Temple | Site announced | 9,950 sq ft (924 m^{2}) | 2.48 acres (10,036 m^{2}) | 3 April 2022 | Russell M. Nelson |
| Map | 311 | Mexico City Benemérito Mexico Temple | Site announced | 29,000 sq ft (2,694 m^{2}) | 8.5 acres (34,398 m^{2}) | 3 April 2022 | Russell M. Nelson |
| | 312 | Busan Korea Temple | Announced | | | 2 October 2022 | Russell M. Nelson |
| Map | 313 | Santiago Philippines Temple | Site announced | 18,850 sq ft (1,751 m^{2}) | 14.47 acres (58,558 m^{2}) | 2 October 2022 | Russell M. Nelson |
| | 314 | Chiclayo Peru Temple | Announced | | | 2 October 2022 | Russell M. Nelson |
| Map | 315 | Buenos Aires City Center Argentina Temple | Site announced | | 1.56 acres (6,313 m^{2}) | 2 October 2022 | Russell M. Nelson |
| Map | 316 | Tacoma Washington Temple | Site announced | 45,000 sq ft (4,181 m^{2}) | 11.6 acres (46,944 m^{2}) | 2 October 2022 | Russell M. Nelson |
| | 317 | Pachuca Mexico Temple | Announced | | | 2 October 2022 | Russell M. Nelson |
| Map | 318 | Toluca Mexico Temple | Site announced | 19,000 sq ft (1,765 m^{2}) | 4.87 acres (19,708 m^{2}) | 2 October 2022 | Russell M. Nelson |
| | 319 | Tula Mexico Temple | Announced | | | 2 October 2022 | Russell M. Nelson |
| Map | 320 | Retalhuleu Guatemala Temple | Site announced | | 5.51 acres (22,298 m^{2}) | 2 April 2023 | Russell M. Nelson |
| Map | 321 | Tuguegarao City Philippines Temple | Site announced | 18,850 sq ft (1,751 m^{2}) | 6.3 acres (25,495 m^{2}) | 2 April 2023 | Russell M. Nelson |
| Map | 322 | Iloilo Philippines Temple | Site announced | 18,850 sq ft (1,751 m^{2}) | 7.7 acres (31,161 m^{2}) | 2 April 2023 | Russell M. Nelson |
| Map | 323 | Jakarta Indonesia Temple | Site announced | 50,000 sq ft (4,645 m^{2}) | 1.5 acres (6,070 m^{2}) | 2 April 2023 | Russell M. Nelson |
| Map | 324 | Hamburg Germany Temple | Site announced | | 1.4 acres (5,666 m^{2}) | 2 April 2023 | Russell M. Nelson |
| Map | 325 | Sunnyvale California Temple | Site announced | 30,000 sq ft (2,787 m^{2}) | 4.73 acres (19,142 m^{2}) | 2 April 2023 | Russell M. Nelson |
| Map | 326 | Bakersfield California Temple | Site announced | 30,000 sq ft (2,787 m^{2}) | 13.07 acres (52,892 m^{2}) | 2 April 2023 | Russell M. Nelson |
| Map | 327 | Charlotte North Carolina Temple | Site announced | 37,000 sq ft (3,437 m^{2}) | 7.7 acres (31,161 m^{2}) | 2 April 2023 | Russell M. Nelson |
| Map | 328 | Harrisburg Pennsylvania Temple | Site announced | 20,000 sq ft (1,858 m^{2}) | 5.36 acres (21,691 m^{2}) | 2 April 2023 | Russell M. Nelson |
| Map | 329 | Savai'i Samoa Temple | Site announced | 29,630 sq ft (2,753 m^{2}) | 4.6 acres (18,616 m^{2}) | 1 October 2023 | Russell M. Nelson |
| | 330 | Cancún Mexico Temple | Announced | | | 1 October 2023 | Russell M. Nelson |
| | 331 | Huancayo Peru Temple | Announced | | | 1 October 2023 | Russell M. Nelson |
| Map | 332 | Goiânia Brazil Temple | Site announced | 18,850 sq ft (1,751 m^{2}) | 5.54 acres (22,420 m^{2}) | 1 October 2023 | Russell M. Nelson |
| | 333 | Cape Coast Ghana Temple | Announced | | | 1 October 2023 | Russell M. Nelson |
| | 334 | Luanda Angola Temple | Announced | | | 1 October 2023 | Russell M. Nelson |
| | 335 | Mbuji-Mayi Democratic Republic of the Congo Temple | Announced | | | 1 October 2023 | Russell M. Nelson |
| | 336 | Laoag Philippines Temple | Announced | | | 1 October 2023 | Russell M. Nelson |
| Map | 337 | Osaka Japan Temple | Site announced | 34,320 sq ft (3,188 m^{2}) | 10 acres (40,469 m^{2}) | 1 October 2023 | Russell M. Nelson |
| Map | 338 | Kahului Hawaii Temple | Site announced | 19,000 sq ft (1,765 m^{2}) | 7.6 acres (30,756 m^{2}) | 1 October 2023 | Russell M. Nelson |
| | 339 | Roanoke Virginia Temple | Announced | | | 1 October 2023 | Russell M. Nelson |
| Map | 340 | Ulaanbaatar Mongolia Temple | Site announced | 18,850 sq ft (1,751 m^{2}) | 11 acres (44,515 m^{2}) | 1 October 2023 | Russell M. Nelson |
| | 341 | Uturoa French Polynesia Temple | Announced | | | 7 April 2024 | Russell M. Nelson |
| Map | 342 | Chihuahua Mexico Temple | Site announced | 19,000 sq ft (1,765 m^{2}) | 5.87 acres (23,755 m^{2}) | 7 April 2024 | Russell M. Nelson |
| Map | 343 | Florianópolis Brazil Temple | Site announced | | 5.5 acres (22,258 m^{2}) | 7 April 2024 | Russell M. Nelson |
| Map | 344 | Rosario Argentina Temple | Site announced | | 1.59 acres (6,435 m^{2}) | 7 April 2024 | Russell M. Nelson |
| | 345 | Edinburgh Scotland Temple | Announced | | | 7 April 2024 | Russell M. Nelson |
| | 346 | Brisbane Australia South Temple | Announced | | | 7 April 2024 | Russell M. Nelson |
| Map | 347 | Yuma Arizona Temple | Site announced | 18,500 sq ft (1,719 m^{2}) | 7 acres (28,328 m^{2}) | 7 April 2024 | Russell M. Nelson |
| Map | 348 | Fort Bend Texas Temple | Site announced | 46,000 sq ft (4,274 m^{2}) | 15.7 acres (63,536 m^{2}) | 7 April 2024 | Russell M. Nelson |
| Map | 349 | Des Moines Iowa Temple | Site announced | 18,850 sq ft (1,751 m^{2}) | 19.576 acres (79,221 m^{2}) | 7 April 2024 | Russell M. Nelson |
| | 350 | Honolulu Hawaii Temple | Announced | | | 7 April 2024 | Russell M. Nelson |
| Map | 351 | West Jordan Utah Temple | Site announced | 85,000 sq ft (7,897 m^{2}) | 16.1 acres (65,154 m^{2}) | 7 April 2024 | Russell M. Nelson |
| | 352 | Maracaibo Venezuela Temple | Announced | | | 7 April 2024 | Russell M. Nelson |
| | 353 | Juchitan de Zaragoza Mexico Temple | Announced | | | 6 October 2024 | Russell M. Nelson |
| | 354 | Santa Ana El Salvador Temple | Announced | | | 6 October 2024 | Russell M. Nelson |
| Map | 355 | Medellín Colombia Temple | Site announced | 10,741 sq ft (998 m^{2}) | 3.05 acres (12,343 m^{2}) | 6 October 2024 | Russell M. Nelson |
| | 356 | Santiago Dominican Republic Temple | Announced | | | 6 October 2024 | Russell M. Nelson |
| Map | 357 | Puerto Montt Chile Temple | Site announced | 18,500 sq ft (1,719 m^{2}) | 5.8 acres (23,472 m^{2}) | 6 October 2024 | Russell M. Nelson |
| | 358 | Dublin Ireland Temple | Announced | | | 6 October 2024 | Russell M. Nelson |
| | 359 | Milan Italy Temple | Announced | | | 6 October 2024 | Russell M. Nelson |
| | 360 | Abuja Nigeria Temple | Announced | | | 6 October 2024 | Russell M. Nelson |
| | 361 | Kampala Uganda Temple | Announced | | | 6 October 2024 | Russell M. Nelson |
| | 362 | Maputo Mozambique Temple | Announced | | | 6 October 2024 | Russell M. Nelson |
| Map | 363 | Queen Creek Arizona Temple | Site announced | 82,000 sq ft (7,618 m^{2}) | 15.5 acres (62,726 m^{2}) | 6 October 2024 | Russell M. Nelson |
| Map | 364 | El Paso Texas Temple | Site announced | 22,300 sq ft (2,072 m^{2}) | 6.4 acres (25,900 m^{2}) | 6 October 2024 | Russell M. Nelson |
| | 365 | Milwaukee Wisconsin Temple | Announced | | | 6 October 2024 | Russell M. Nelson |
| | 366 | Summit New Jersey Temple | Announced | | | 6 October 2024 | Russell M. Nelson |
| | 367 | Price Utah Temple | Announced | | | 6 October 2024 | Russell M. Nelson |
| | 368 | Reynosa Mexico Temple | Announced | | | 6 April 2025 | Russell M. Nelson |
| | 369 | Chorrillos Peru Temple | Announced | | | 6 April 2025 | Russell M. Nelson |
| | 370 | Rivera Uruguay Temple | Announced | | | 6 April 2025 | Russell M. Nelson |
| Map | 371 | Campo Grande Brazil Temple | Site announced | 11,300 sq ft (1,050 m^{2}) | 5.6 acres (22,662 m^{2}) | 6 April 2025 | Russell M. Nelson |
| | 372 | Porto Portugal Temple | Announced | | | 6 April 2025 | Russell M. Nelson |
| | 373 | Uyo Nigeria Temple | Announced | | | 6 April 2025 | Russell M. Nelson |
| | 374 | San Jose del Monte Philippines Temple | Announced | | | 6 April 2025 | Russell M. Nelson |
| | 375 | Nouméa New Caledonia Temple | Announced | | | 6 April 2025 | Russell M. Nelson |
| | 376 | Liverpool Australia Temple | Announced | | | 6 April 2025 | Russell M. Nelson |
| Map | 377 | Caldwell Idaho Temple | Site announced | 82,000 sq ft (7,618 m^{2}) | 19.2 acres (77,700 m^{2}) | 6 April 2025 | Russell M. Nelson |
| Map | 378 | Flagstaff Arizona Temple | Site announced | 19,000 sq ft (1,765 m^{2}) | 7.6 acres (30,756 m^{2}) | 6 April 2025 | Russell M. Nelson |
| Map | 379 | Rapid City South Dakota Temple | Site announced | 11,800 sq ft (1,096 m^{2}) | 4.86 acres (19,668 m^{2}) | 6 April 2025 | Russell M. Nelson |
| Map | 378 | Greenville South Carolina Temple | Site announced | 18,850 sq ft (1,751 m^{2}) | 8.8 acres (35,612 m^{2}) | 6 April 2025 | Russell M. Nelson |
| Map | 381 | Norfolk Virginia Temple | Site announced | 18,650 sq ft (1,733 m^{2}) | 23 acres (93,078 m^{2}) | 6 April 2025 | Russell M. Nelson |
| Map | 382 | Spanish Fork Utah Temple | Site announced | 80,000 sq ft (7,432 m^{2}) | 8.7 acres (35,208 m^{2}) | 6 April 2025 | Russell M. Nelson |
| | 383 | Portland Maine Temple | Announced | | | 14 December 2025 | Dallin H. Oaks |
| | 384 | Marysville Washington Temple | Announced | | | 19 April 2026 | Dallin H. Oaks |
| Map | 385 | Otavalo Ecuador Temple | Site announced | 18,850 sq ft (1,751 m^{2}) | 6.05 acres (24,483 m^{2}) | 14 May 2026 | Dallin H. Oaks |

=== Under renovation ===
Temples in this section are closed for extensive renovation, with the closure either anticipated to last at least a year, and/or if the work will necessitate a subsequent rededication.

| Image | Nº | Name | Status | Area | | Original Dedication | |
| Image | Nº | Name | Status | Floor | Site | Date | by |
|---|---|---|---|---|---|---|---|
| | 4 | Salt Lake Temple | Closed for renovation | 382,207 sq ft (35,508 m^{2}) | 10 acres (40,469 m^{2}) | 6 April 1893 | Wilford Woodruff |
| | 15 | Provo Utah Temple | Closed for renovation | 128,325 sq ft (11,922 m^{2}) | 17 acres (68,797 m^{2}) | February 9, 1972 | Joseph Fielding Smith |
| | 34 | Stockholm Sweden Temple | Closed for renovation | 31,000 sq ft (2,880 m^{2}) | 4.47 acres (18,089 m^{2}) | 2 July 1985 | Gordon B. Hinckley |
| | 46 | Orlando Florida Temple | Closed for renovation | 70,000 sq ft (6,503 m^{2}) | 13 acres (52,609 m^{2}) | October 9, 1994 | Howard W. Hunter |
| | 70 | Kona Hawaii Temple | Closed for renovation | 12,325 sq ft (1,145 m^{2}) | 7.02 acres (28,409 m^{2}) | January 23, 2000 | Gordon B. Hinckley |
| | 119 | Manhattan New York Temple | Closed for renovation | 20,630 sq ft (1,917 m^{2}) | 0.3 acres (1,214 m^{2}) | June 13, 2004 | Gordon B. Hinckley |

==== Renovation scheduled ====
Temples scheduled to close for extensive renovations, generally meaning the closure is anticipated to last at least a year and/or if it is anticipated to reopen for a rededication.

| Image | Nº | Name | Status | Area | | Original Dedication | |
| Image | Nº | Name | Status | Floor | Site | Date | by |
|---|---|---|---|---|---|---|---|
| Map | 22 | Apia Samoa Temple | Operating | 18,691 sq ft (1,736 m^{2}) | 2 acres (8,094 m^{2}) | 5 August 1983 | Gordon B. Hinckley |

==== Relocation and resizing underway ====
| | Name | Status | Area | | Dedication | |
| | Name | Status | Floor | Site | Date | by |
|---|---|---|---|---|---|---|
| Map | Anchorage Alaska Temple (New) | Dedication scheduled | 30,000 sq ft (2,787 m^{2}) | 5.4 acres (21,853 m^{2}) | 13 June 2027 | TBA |

=== Efforts suspended ===
This is a list of temples that had been announced and in some stage of development, but whose construction is not actively being pursued.

| Name | Status | Area | | Announced | |
| | Status | Floor | Site | Date | by |
|---|---|---|---|---|---|
| Temple Lot | Efforts halted in 1830s | | | April 1829 | Joseph Smith |
| Adam-ondi-Ahman Temple | Efforts halted in 1830s | | 3,000 acres (12,140,569 m^{2}) | April 26, 1838 | Joseph Smith |
| Far West Temple | Efforts halted in 1830s | | 640 acres (2,589,988 m^{2}) | April 16, 1838 | Joseph Smith |
| Harrison New York Temple | Efforts suspended in 2006 | 28,400 sq ft (2,638 m^{2}) | 24 acres (97,125 m^{2}) | September 30, 1995 | Gordon B. Hinckley |

== See also ==
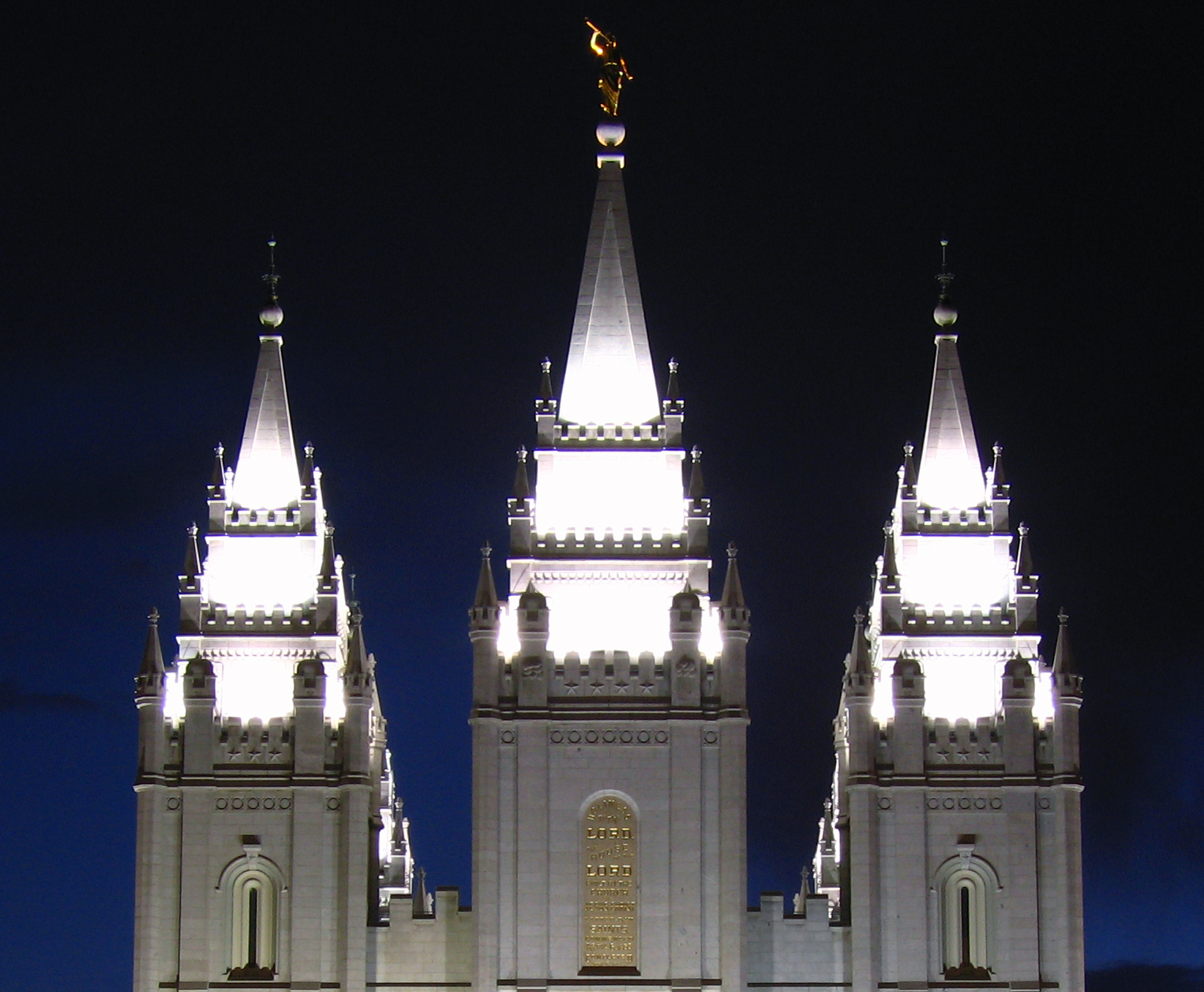
The Salt Lake Temple at night

- Council House (Salt Lake City)
- Red Brick Store
- Temple architecture (LDS Church)

== Sources ==
- "Newsroom: Official Temple List". churchofjesuschrist.org. Church of Jesus Christ of Latter-day Saints. (official list)
- Avant, Gerry (2013). Deseret News 2013 Church Almanac. Salt Lake City: Deseret Management Corporation. ISBN 978-1-60907-420-3. (Almanac)
- Hawkins, Chad (2001). The First 100 Temples. Deseret Management Corp.
- Packer, Boyd K. (June 1980). The Holy Temple. Bookcraft Publications. ISBN 0-88494-411-5.
