= Tallahassee Florida Temple =

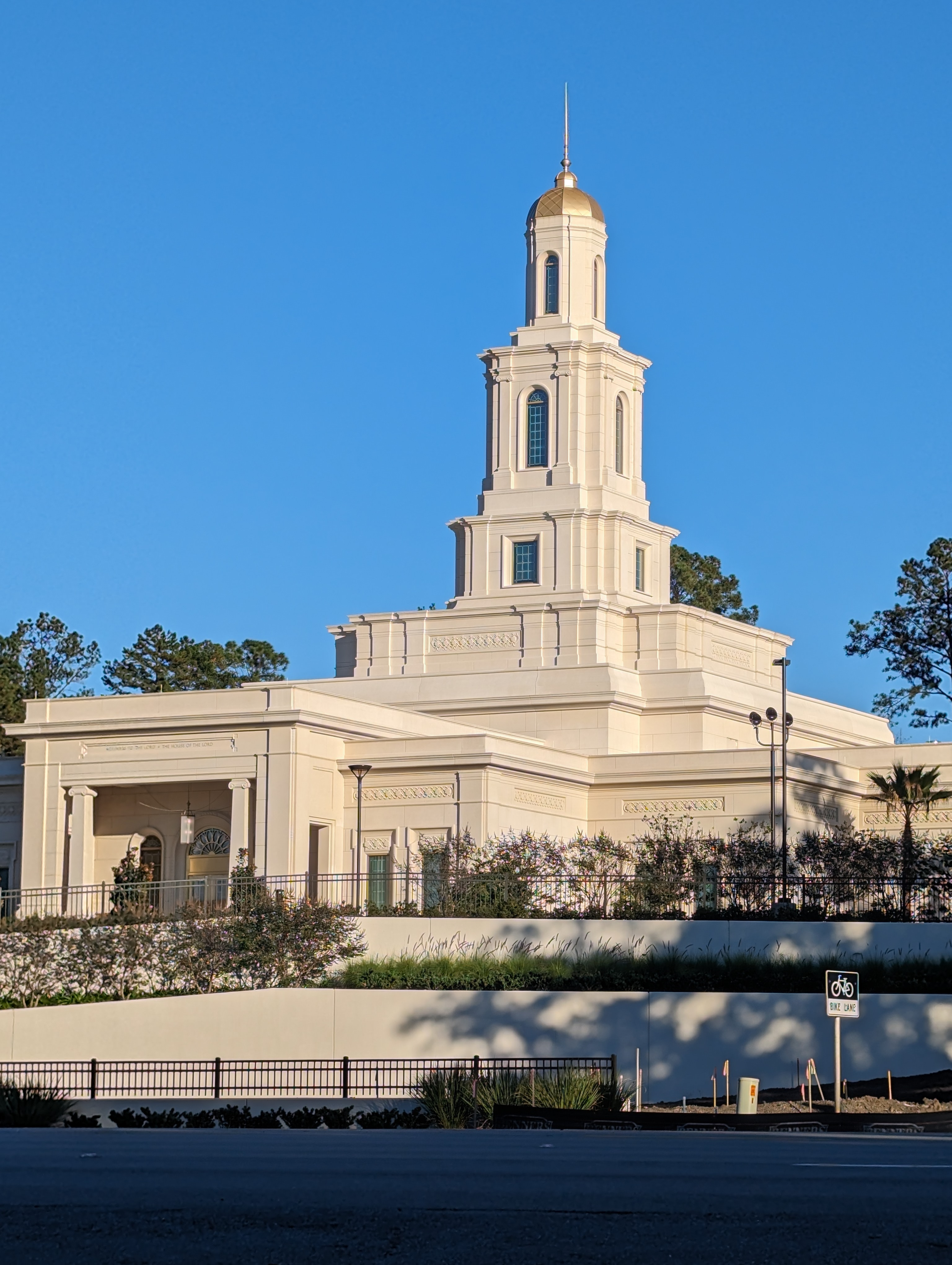
- Interactive map of Tallahassee Florida Temple
- Number: 202
- Dedication: 8 December 2024, by Patrick Kearon
- Site: 4.97 acres (2.01 ha)
- Floor area: 29,225 ft^{2} (2,715.1 m^{2})
- Official website • News & images

Church chronology
← Casper Wyoming Temple	Tallahassee Florida Temple	→ Auckland New Zealand Temple

Additional information
- Announced: 5 April 2020, by Russell M. Nelson
- Groundbreaking: 5 June 2021, by James B. Martino
- Open house: 4-23 November 2024
- Current president: Douglas Gilbert
- Location: Tallahassee, Florida, United States
- Coordinates: 30°31′12″N 84°14′18″W
- Baptistries: 1
- Ordinance rooms: 2
- Sealing rooms: 2

The Tallahassee Florida Temple is a temple of the Church of Jesus Christ of Latter-day Saints in Tallahassee, Florida. The intent to build the temple was announced on April 5, 2020, by church president Russell M. Nelson, during general conference. It is the church's third in Florida, and the state's westernmost temple.

A groundbreaking ceremony, to signify the beginning of construction, was held on June 5, 2021, conducted by James B. Martino, a church general authority. The temple was dedicated on December 8, 2024, by Patrick Kearon.

== History ==
The intent to construct the temple was announced by Russell M. Nelson on April 5, 2020. On January 13, 2021, the church announced that the temple would be constructed on a 4.97-acre property in Tallahassee. Preliminary plans called for a single-story structure of 29,000 square feet.

A groundbreaking ceremony took place on June 5, 2021, with James B. Martino presiding, and was attended by local church members and community leaders.

A public open house was held during November 2024 and the temple was dedicated on December 8, 2024, by Patrick Kearon.

== Design and architecture ==
The building is designed in the traditional style of Latter-day Saint temples, reflecting the cultural heritage of Tallahassee and its spiritual significance to the church. Situated on a 4.97-acre plot, the temple's landscaping includes trees and bushes to enhance its serene atmosphere. A church distribution center is under construction on the site, near an existing meetinghouse, to support local church members.

Standing 204 feet tall, the temple has a central five-tiered tower topped by a golden dome. The exterior is designed from pale precast concrete. The temple's interior is designed to accommodate ceremonies sacred to Latter-day Saints, and includes with two sealing rooms, two instruction rooms, and a baptistry.

The architectural design uses both Latter-day Saint and Biblical symbolism, like the baptistry featuring a large, elevated pool supported by 12 carved oxen, symbolizing the Twelve Tribes of Israel—a visual representation of the church's beliefs and connection to its scriptural foundations. These design elements add meaning to the temple's appearance and function, reflecting the sacred purpose it serves for its members.

== Temple presidents ==
The church's temples are directed by a temple president and matron, each serving for a term of three years. The president and matron oversee the administration of temple operations and provide guidance and training for both temple patrons and staff.

The first president and matron of the Tallahassee Florida Temple are Douglas D. Gilbert and Kathy F. Gilbert.

== Admittance ==
On July 1, 2024, the church announced the public open house that was held from November 4–23, 2024 (excluding Sundays). The temple was dedicated by Patrick Kearon on December 8, 2024. Like all the church's temples, it is not used for Sunday worship services. To members of the church, temples are regarded as sacred houses of the Lord. Once dedicated, only church members with a current temple recommend can enter for worship.

== See also ==
- Comparison of temples (LDS Church)
- List of temples (LDS Church)
- List of temples by geographic region (LDS Church)
- Temple architecture (LDS Church)
- The Church of Jesus Christ of Latter-day Saints in Florida
