= Wichita Kansas Temple =

LDS temple

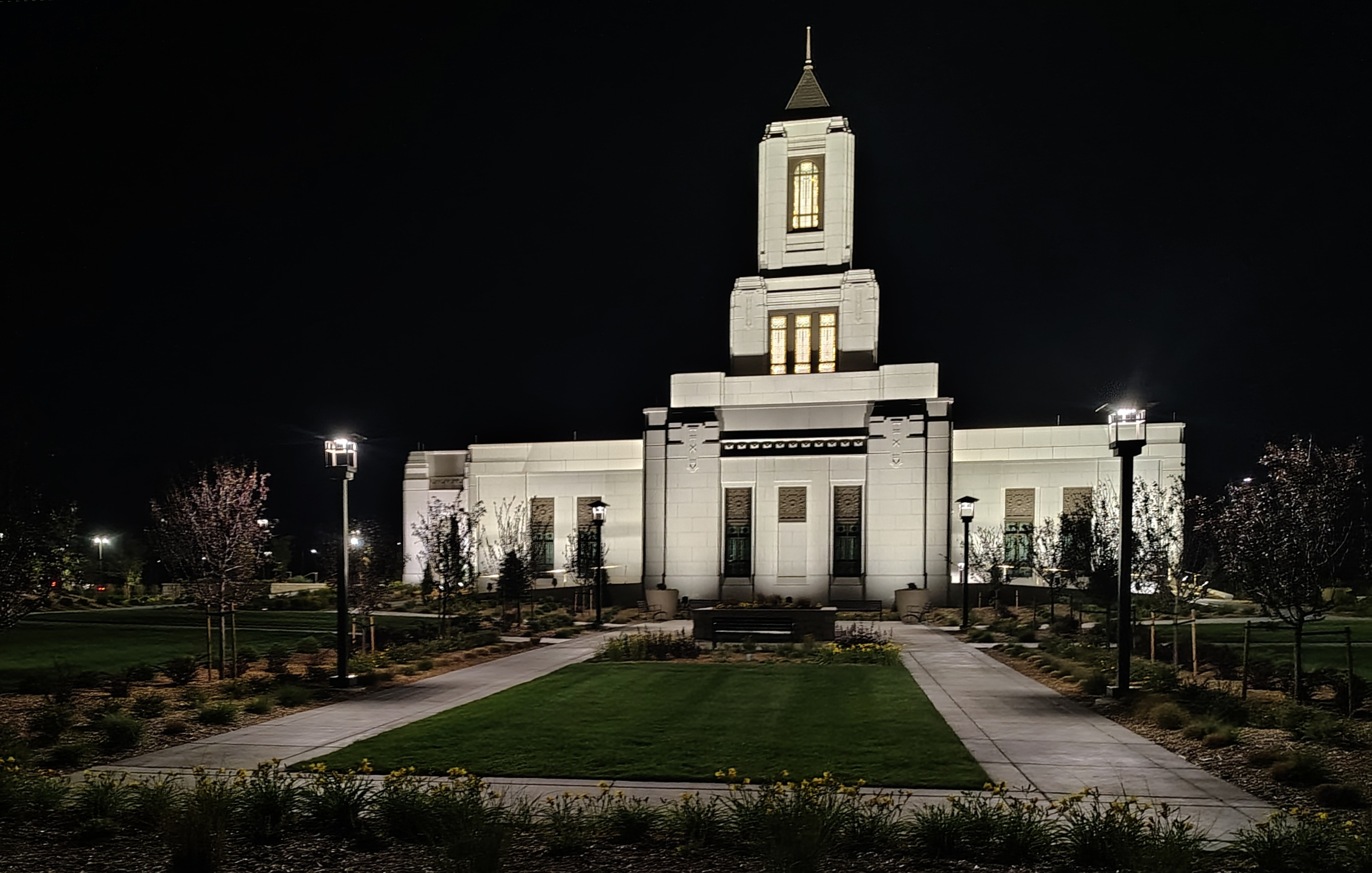
- Wichita Kansas Temple at night prior to open house and dedication
- Interactive map of Wichita Kansas Temple
- Number: 228
- Dedication: 1 November 2026, by Patrick Kearon
- Site: 6.42 acres (2.60 ha)
- Floor area: 9,950 ft^{2} (924 m^{2})
- Official website • News & images

Additional information
- Announced: 3 April 2022, by Russell M. Nelson
- Groundbreaking: 7 September 2024, by Steven R. Bangerter
- Open house: 24 September-10 October 2026
- Current president: Brian Lee Rawson
- Location: Wichita, Kansas
- Coordinates: 37.7759°N 97.3730°W
- Baptistries: 1
- Ordinance rooms: 1 (stationary)
- Sealing rooms: 1

The Wichita Kansas Temple is a temple of the Church of Jesus Christ of Latter-day Saints in Wichita, Kansas. Church president Russell M. Nelson announced the intent to build the temple on April 3, 2022, during general conference. The temple is the church's first in Kansas. A groundbreaking ceremony, signifying the beginning of construction, was held on September 7, 2024, with Steven R. Bangerter, a general authority and first counselor in the presidency of the church's North America Central Area, presiding. The temple was dedicated on November 1, 2026, by Patrick Kearon, of the Quorum of the Twelve Apostles.

== History ==
The church's presence in Kansas dates to 1831, when missionaries taught members of the Shawnee and Delaware tribes. During the mid-1800s, the Atchison, Kansas area functioned as a stopping point for church members emigrating from Europe toward the Salt Lake Valley. Near Atchison, at a camp known as Mormon Grove, emigrants cultivated more than 100 acres of crops in 1855 to supply future immigrants. The first branch was formed in Kansas in 1882 in the Meridian area along the border of Dickinson and Saline counties. The state's first stake was organized in June 1962.

Before construction of this temple, church members in Kansas traveled to adjacent states for temple worship, with the Oklahoma City Oklahoma Temple being approximately 150 miles south and the Kansas City Missouri Temple about 185 miles northeast. A local church communications director described the distance as requiring significant sacrifice from members.

Church president Russell M. Nelson announced the intent to build the temple on April 3, 2022, during general conference. The announcement was part of a group of 17 new temples revealed at that conference. At the time, approximately 38,000 church members were organized into about 75 congregations in Kansas. Those identified that day brought to the total number of temples announced by Nelson to 100 since he became church president in 2018.

The temple's site on was announced on June 20, 2023, a 6.42-acre parcel at Lot 1, Block 1 of The Moorings Plaza Fourth Addition in Wichita, Sedgwick County, Kansas. Initial plans were for a single-story structure of approximately 9,950 square feet.

The exterior rendering was released on July 22, 2024. The groundbreaking ceremony occurred on September 7, 2024, initiating construction. Steven R. Bangerter, a general authority and first counselor in the presidency of the church's North America Central Area, presided at the ceremony. Those attending included community, government, and faith leaders from Wichita, including Kansas state senator Oletha Faust-Goudeau and state representative Stephen Owens. John Bazzelle, a sixth-generation church member from Wichita, whose ancestors helped establish the church in Kansas, spoke at the ceremony about the significance of having a temple in the state.

Following completion of construction and prior to the temple dedication, an open house was held from September 24, 2026 through October 10 (with a brief puase during the LDS Church's general conference on October 3 and 4) during which the temple was open for public tours. The temple was dedicated on November 1, 2026, by Patrick Kearon, of the Quorum of the Twelve Apostles.

== Design and architecture ==
The temple's design is for a single-story structure of approximately 9,950 square feet. The 2024 exterior rendering depicts rectangular windows encircling an arched entrance, with a single central tower containing rectangular windows rising above the building's center.

The temple is on a 6.42-acre parcel within the Moorings Plaza development. Surrounding landscaping includes flower beds, bushes, and trees. The exterior rendering showed rectangular windows surrounding an arched entrance. The design motifs were chosen to reflect the "rolling wheat fields and sunflowers" and other agricultural landscape of the area. According to plans, the temple will include an ordinance room and sealing room, along with a baptistry.

== See also ==
- The Church of Jesus Christ of Latter-day Saints in Kansas
- Comparison of temples (LDS Church)
- List of temples (LDS Church)
- List of temples by geographic region (LDS Church)
- Temple architecture (LDS Church)
- Architecture of the LDS Church
