= Casper Wyoming Temple =

LDS Church temple in Wyoming

- Interactive map of Casper Wyoming Temple
- Number: 201
- Dedication: 24 November 2024, by Quentin L. Cook
- Site: 9.52 acres (3.85 ha)
- Floor area: 9,950 ft^{2} (924 m^{2})
- Official website • News & images

Church chronology
← Deseret Peak Utah Temple	Casper Wyoming Temple	→ Tallahassee Florida Temple

Additional information
- Announced: 4 April 2021, by Russell M. Nelson
- Groundbreaking: 9 October 2021, by S. Gifford Nielsen
- Open house: 29 August-14 September 2024
- Current president: Millard L. Smathers
- Location: Casper, Wyoming, U.S.
- Coordinates: 42°48′35″N 106°21′47″W
- Baptistries: 1
- Ordinance rooms: 1
- Sealing rooms: 1
- Notes: The temple's dedication was originally scheduled for October 13, 2024. On August 26, 2024, as the temple's open house began, it was announced the dedication was rescheduled to November 24, 2024.

The Casper Wyoming Temple is a temple of the Church of Jesus Christ of Latter-day Saints in Casper, Wyoming. The intent to build the temple was announced on April 4, 2021, by church president Russell M. Nelson, during general conference. It is the second in Wyoming, following the temple in Star Valley, with a third under construction in Cody. A groundbreaking ceremony, to signify the beginning of construction, was held on October 9, 2021, conducted by Gifford Nielsen, a church general authority. The temple was dedicated on November 24, 2024, by Quentin L. Cook, of the church's Quorum of the Twelve Apostles.

== History ==
On April 4, 2021, the intent to build the Casper Wyoming Temple was announced by Russell M. Nelson. The site for the temple was announced on June 10, 2021, “as a 9.5-acre property at the corner of Wyoming Boulevard (Highway 258) and Eagle Drive in a developing area of southwest Casper near the highway to martin’s Cove.”

On October 9, 2021, a groundbreaking ceremony took place marking the commencement of construction, with Gifford Nielsen presiding and local church members and community leaders attending. Once construction completed, a media day was held on August 26, 2024, followed by a public open house from August 29 through September 14. The temple was dedicated on November 24, 2024, by Quentin L. Cook.

== Design and architecture ==
The building has a traditional Latter-day Saint temple design and reflects the cultural heritage of Casper and its spiritual significance to the church. The temple is on a 9.5-acre plot, and the landscaping around the temple features small bushes, grass, and trees.

The temple is a single-story building with “a three-tiered tower with three rectangular windows on each side of the middle tier and one arched window on each side of the top tier.” The temple includes a baptistry, a sealing room, and an instruction room.

The design has elements representing Latter-day Saint symbolism, providing spiritual meaning to the temple's appearance and function. Symbolism is important to church members. According to Nelson, each temple “stands as a symbol of our faith in life after death and as a stepping stone to eternal life for us and our families.”

== Temple presidents ==
The church's temples are directed by a temple president and matron, each serving for a term of three years. The president and matron oversee the administration of temple operations and provide guidance and training for both temple patrons and staff. The first temple president is Millard L. Smathers, with Jo Rae C. Smathers serving as matron.

== Admittance ==
On February 12, 2024, the church announced the public open house that was held from August 29 to September 14 (excluding Sundays). The temple was dedicated by Quentin L. Cook on November 24, 2024. Like all the church's temples, it is not used for Sunday worship services. To members of the church, temples are regarded as sacred houses of the Lord. Once dedicated, only church members with a current temple recommend can enter for worship.

== See also ==
- Comparison of temples (LDS Church)
- List of temples (LDS Church)
- List of temples by geographic region (LDS Church)
- Temple architecture (LDS Church)
