= Fortaleza Brazil Temple =

Temple of The Church of Jesus Christ of Latter-day Saints

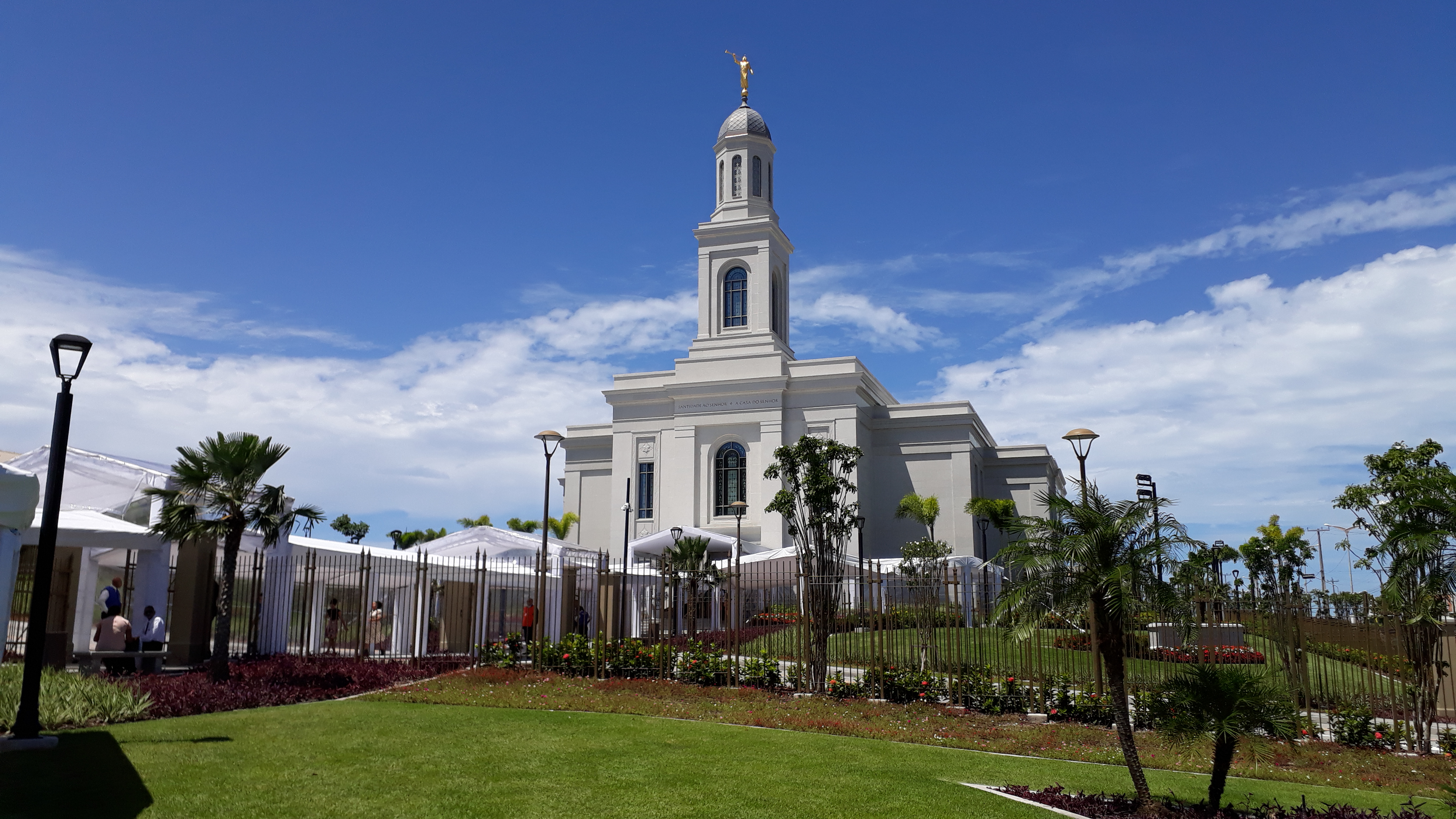
- Interactive map of Fortaleza Brazil Temple
- Number: 164
- Dedication: 2 June 2019, by Ulisses Soares
- Site: 10 acres (4.0 ha)
- Floor area: 36,000 ft^{2} (3,300 m^{2})
- Official website • News & images

Church chronology
← Kinshasa Democratic Republic of the Congo Temple	Fortaleza Brazil Temple	→ Port-au-Prince Haiti Temple

Additional information
- Announced: 3 October 2009, by Thomas S. Monson
- Groundbreaking: 15 November 2011, by David A. Bednar
- Open house: April 27 to May 18, 2019
- Current president: Francisco J. da Silva
- Location: Fortaleza, Brazil
- Coordinates: 3°44′52″S 38°27′39″W
- Exterior finish: Branco Ceara granite
- Baptistries: 1
- Ordinance rooms: 2
- Sealing rooms: 2

The Fortaleza Brazil Temple is a temple of the Church of Jesus Christ of Latter-day Saints in Fortaleza, Ceará, Brazil. The temple is the church's first in Ceará and the seventh in Brazil; ground was broken on November 15, 2011. The temple was dedicated by apostle Ulisses Soares on June 2, 2019.

== History ==
The intent to construct the Fortaleza Brazil Temple was announced by church president Thomas S. Monson on October 3, 2009, during general conference, concurrently with the Brigham City Utah, Concepción Chile, Fort Lauderdale Florida, and Sapporo Japan temples. It became the church's seventh temple in Brazil and the 164th worldwide.

On November 15, 2011, the church held a groundbreaking ceremony on an 10-acre site located at Avenida Santos Dumont in the Dunas neighborhood. The ceremony was presided over by David A. Bednar of the Quorum of the Twelve Apostles.

After construction was completed, the church announced a public open house that was held from April 27 to May 18, 2019, excluding Sundays. During the open house, approximately 60,000 people toured the temple, including the mayor of Fortaleza Roberto Cláudio and governor of Ceará Camilo Santana.

The temple was dedicated on June 2, 2019, by Ulisses Soares. The dedication and temple dedicatory prayer were offered entirely in Portuguese.

== Design and architecture ==
The temple is on an 10-acre plot in Fortaleza’s Dunas neighborhood, near the Atlantic Ocean.

The temple’s exterior has locally quarried Branco Ceará granite, and a single domed tower rising over 100 feet. The interior of the temple includes an ordnance room, two sealing rooms, and a baptistry. Decorative features include custom glasswork, carpets, and woodwork incorporating Brazilian floral motifs such as orchids and vine patterns.

== See also ==
- List of temples of The Church of Jesus Christ of Latter-day Saints
- The Church of Jesus Christ of Latter-day Saints in Brazil
