= Ulisses Soares =

Brazilian Mormon church official

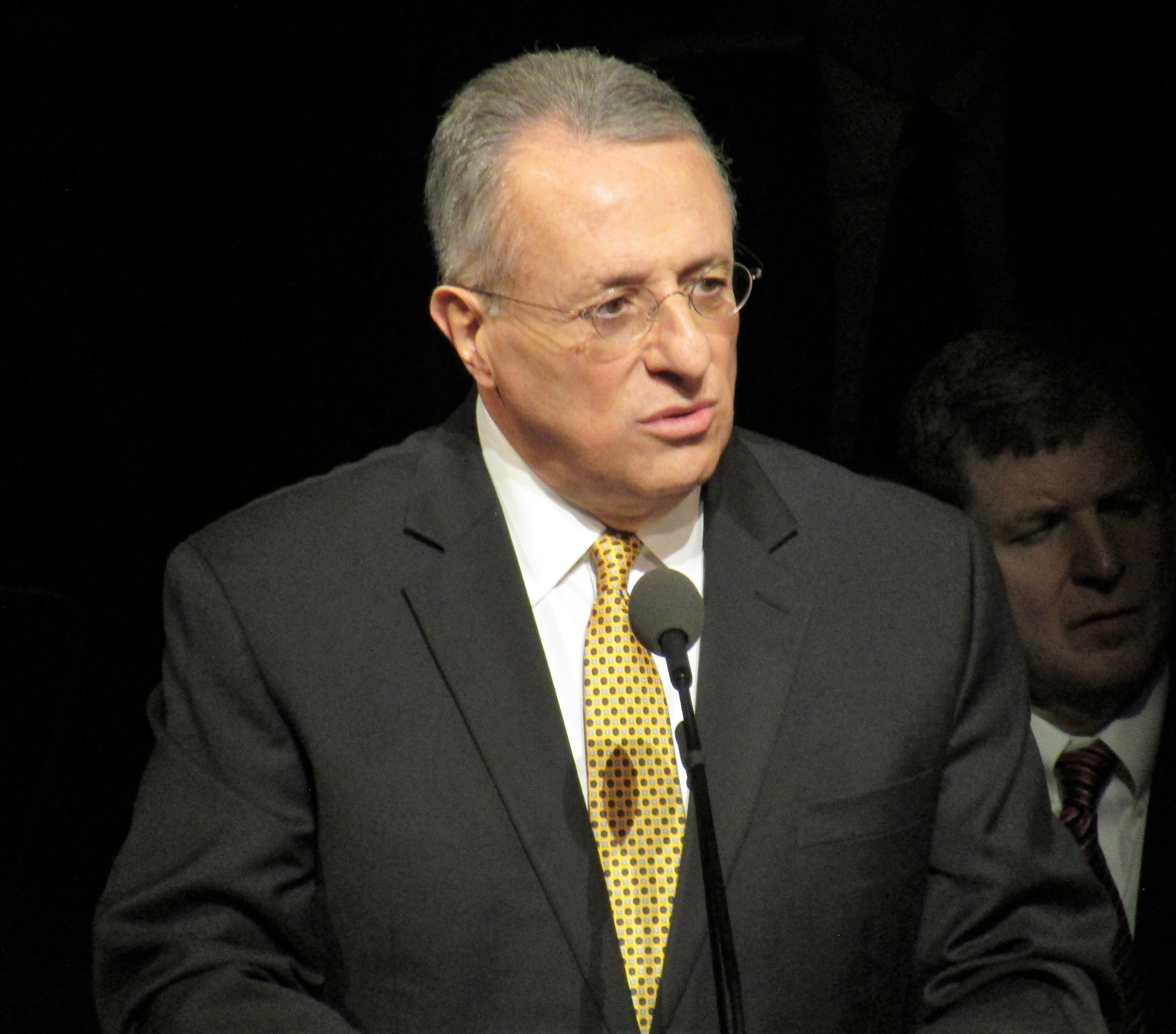

Quorum of the Twelve Apostles
- 31 March 2018
- Called by: Russell M. Nelson

LDS Church Apostle
- 5 April 2018
- Called by: Russell M. Nelson
- Reason: Death of Thomas S. Monson, reorganization of the First Presidency

Presidency of the Seventy
- 6 January 2013 – 31 March 2018
- Called by: Thomas S. Monson
- End reason: Called to the Quorum of the Twelve Apostles

First Quorum of the Seventy
- 2 April 2005 – 31 March 2018
- Called by: Gordon B. Hinckley
- End reason: Called to the Quorum of the Twelve Apostles

Personal details
- Born: Ulisses Soares; 2 October 1958 (age 67); São Paulo, Brazil
- Alma mater: Pontifical Catholic University of São Paulo (BA); National Institute of Postgraduate Study (MBA)
- Spouse(s): Rosana Fernandes Morgado (1982–present)
- Children: 3
- Parents: Apparecido and Mercedes Carecho Soares

Ulisses Soares (born 2 October 1958) is a Brazilian religious leader and former businessman who serves as a member of the Quorum of the Twelve Apostles of the Church of Jesus Christ of Latter-day Saints (LDS Church). He has been a general authority since 2005 and served as a member of the church's Presidency of the Seventy from January 2013 until his calling to the Quorum of the Twelve in March 2018. He is the LDS Church's first apostle from South America. As a member of the Quorum of the Twelve, Soares is accepted by the LDS Church as a prophet, seer, and revelator. Currently, he is the twelfth most senior apostle in the church.

== Early life and education ==
Soares was born in 1958 in São Paulo, Brazil, the son of Apparecido Soares and Mercedes Carecho Soares. He is of Amerindian and European descent. His family joined the LDS Church when he was six, after learning of the church from an aunt who had joined. The LDS branch they first attended met in a rented space above a bakery, and Soares has spoken of fond memories of the smells of baking bread wafting into sacrament meeting. Soares was baptized at age eight. Soares was present at a meeting in 1966 when the LDS Church's first stake, both in Brazil and in South America, was organized. Soares was called as a youth Sunday School teacher by his bishop when he was 15 years old.

For three years prior to his mission, Soares worked in both the payroll accounting departments of a company to save money to serve as a missionary. He attended evening classes in an accounting high school during this same time. Beginning in early 1978, Soares then served as an LDS Church missionary in the Brazil Rio de Janeiro Mission. The mission then included all of Brazil north and west of Rio de Janeiro, including Fortaleza where Soares would later dedicate a temple. His mission president was Helio da Rocha Camargo. When Soares began his mission there was no temple in Latin America. When a temple in São Paulo was dedicated in late 1978, Soares was given permission to leave the mission and to receive his temple ordinances, including the endowment, in January 1980.

Soares received a bachelor's degree in accounting and economics from the Pontifical Catholic University of São Paulo in 1985. He also received an MBA from the National Institute of Postgraduate Study.

== Career ==
Prior to being called as a general authority, Soares was employed as the director of temporal affairs for the LDS Church's Brazil South Area. At the time of his call as a general authority, he was working on a special assignment for the church's Presiding Bishopric in Salt Lake City. He had worked for Pirelli Tire Company and other multi-national corporations as an auditor and accountant. He was convinced by Donald L. Clark to take a job as a senior auditor for the church. After Clark was appointed as a mission president, Soares replaced him as director of temporal affairs.

== LDS Church service ==
Soares has served in the LDS Church as an elders quorum president, counselor in a bishopric, member of a stake high council and regional welfare agent. In 1995, Soares was appointed the first president of the São Paulo Brazil Cotia Stake. Soares served as president of the Portugal Porto Mission from 2000 to 2003.

=== General authority seventy ===
In 2005, Soares became a member of the LDS Church's First Quorum of the Seventy. In his first talk at a general conference in October 2005 he emphasized that the gospel is about people not programs. He has served as a counselor and as president of the church's Brazil South Area and as a counselor in the Africa Southeast Area. While in the later position, he lived in South Africa and oversaw church operations in about 20 African nations, including Mozambique and Angola with their officially Portuguese speaking status. On 6 January 2013, Soares became a member of the Presidency of the Seventy, replacing Walter F. González. In that capacity, Soares had responsibility for the church's North America Southeast Area, along with the Idaho and North America Central areas. While serving in that assignment, Soares participated in the dedications of the Meridian Idaho, Fort Collins Colorado, and Star Valley Wyoming temples. In September 2017, Soares accompanied Neil L. Andersen to organize the church's 100th stake in the Philippines.

=== Quorum of the Twelve ===
On 31 March 2018, Soares was sustained as a member of the Quorum of the Twelve Apostles. He and Gerrit W. Gong were sustained to fill the vacancies created from the deaths of Thomas S. Monson and Robert D. Hales. He was widely reported as one of the first two "non-white" members of the Quorum of the Twelve and first Latino apostle. The appointments of Soares and Gong was called the church leadership's "most significant nod to global diversity since the 1978 revelation on the priesthood" by LDS studies scholar Patrick Q. Mason. Marcus Martins, an LDS expert in sociology and a native of Brazil, said that the call of Soares showcased the potential for international service of many Brazilian members of the LDS Church.

The first major tour Soares did as an apostle was to multiple countries in western Africa. He traveled with Neil L. Andersen, and their wives, to Senegal, Nigeria, Ghana, and the Ivory Coast. As of June 2018, he is assigned to serve on the church's missionary executive council. He is also serving as a member of the church's human resources committee and as the apostle with responsibility for the church's Africa West and Central America areas.

In 2019, Soares dedicated the church's Fortaleza Brazil Temple in June and the Arequipa Peru Temple in December. Also in December 2019, Soares was a speaker at the First Presidency Christmas Devotional. Along with all members of the First Presidency and Quorum of the Twelve, he participated in the dedication of the Rome Italy Temple in March 2019, along with accompanying Dallin H. Oaks in the dedication of the Barranquilla Colombia Temple in December 2018. Also in 2019, Soares visited an immigrant welcome center and the Texas Central Foodbank to review the operation aid being given by the church and to show general support. In September 2019, Soares presided at a "Face to Face" worldwide broadcast for young adults, along with Craig C. Christensen, a general authority seventy. The event originated from the campus of Brigham Young University, with questions answered in Spanish, Portuguese, and English to generate international participation in the event. This was the church's first worldwide broadcast which originated using multiple languages.

In February 2020, Soares did a multi-country ministry tour of Central America, during which he visited the president of Guatemala and the leader of Costa Rica's legislature.

In July 2020, Soares spoke in the church's first Youth Music Festival. As of October 2020, Soares is serving as an advisor to the committee working on revising the church's hymn and children's song books.

In February 2021, Soares participated in the church's first ever worldwide broadcast to Primary children. In March 2022, he and his wife participated in Family Discovery Day, part of the church's annual RootsTech conference, to share their life stories, family history, and the history of the church in Brazil.

== Personal life ==
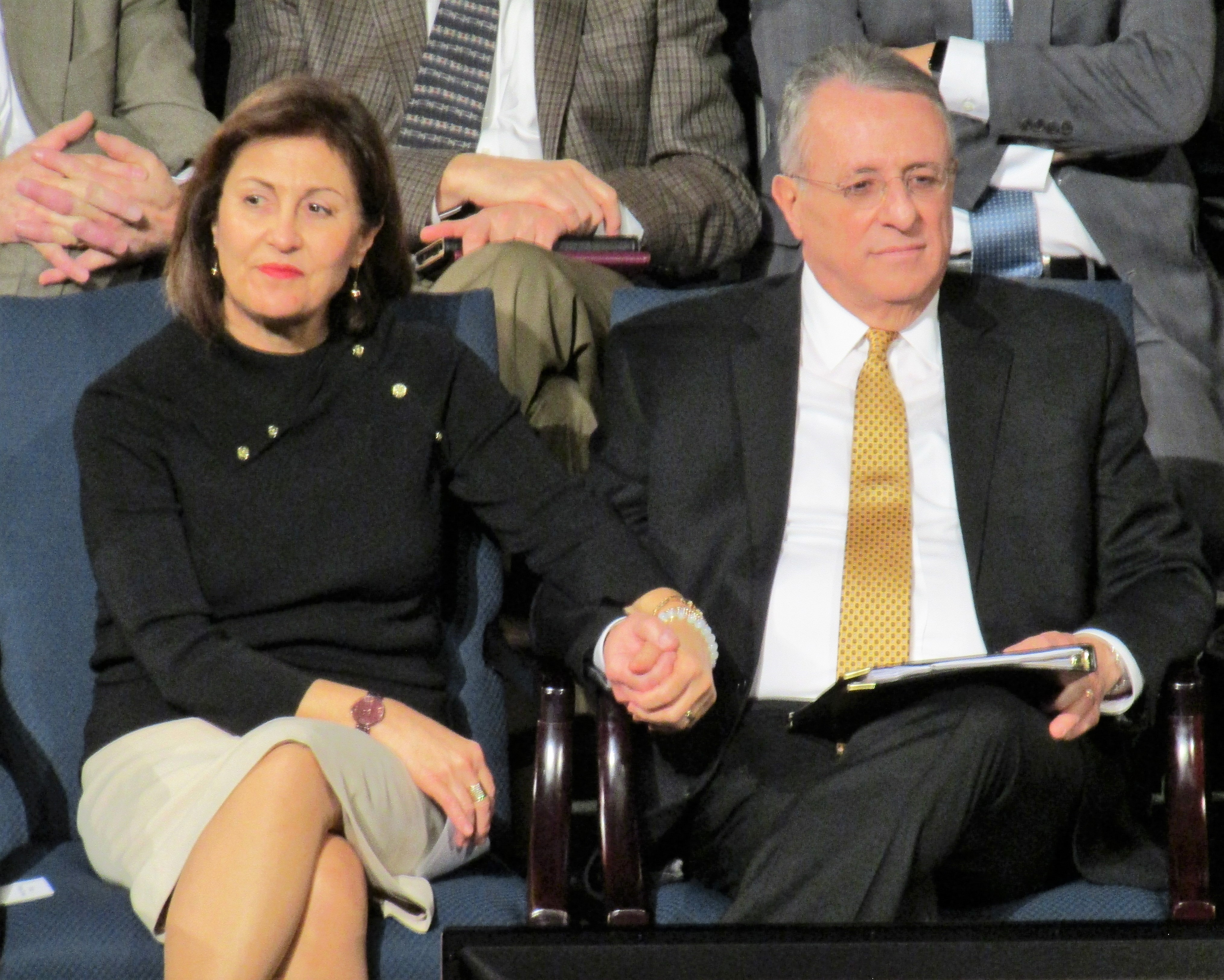
Rosana and Ulisses Soares

Soares married Rosana Fernandes Morgado in the Sao Paulo Brazil Temple in October 1982. They served as missionaries in the Brazil Rio de Janeiro Mission at the same time, but did not meet until they were both at a stake dance in Sao Paulo. They have three children.

The Church of Jesus Christ of Latter-day Saints titles
Preceded by Gerrit W. Gong	Quorum of the Twelve Apostles; March 31, 2018 –	Succeeded by Patrick Kearon
