= Patrick Kearon =

British religious leader (born 1961)

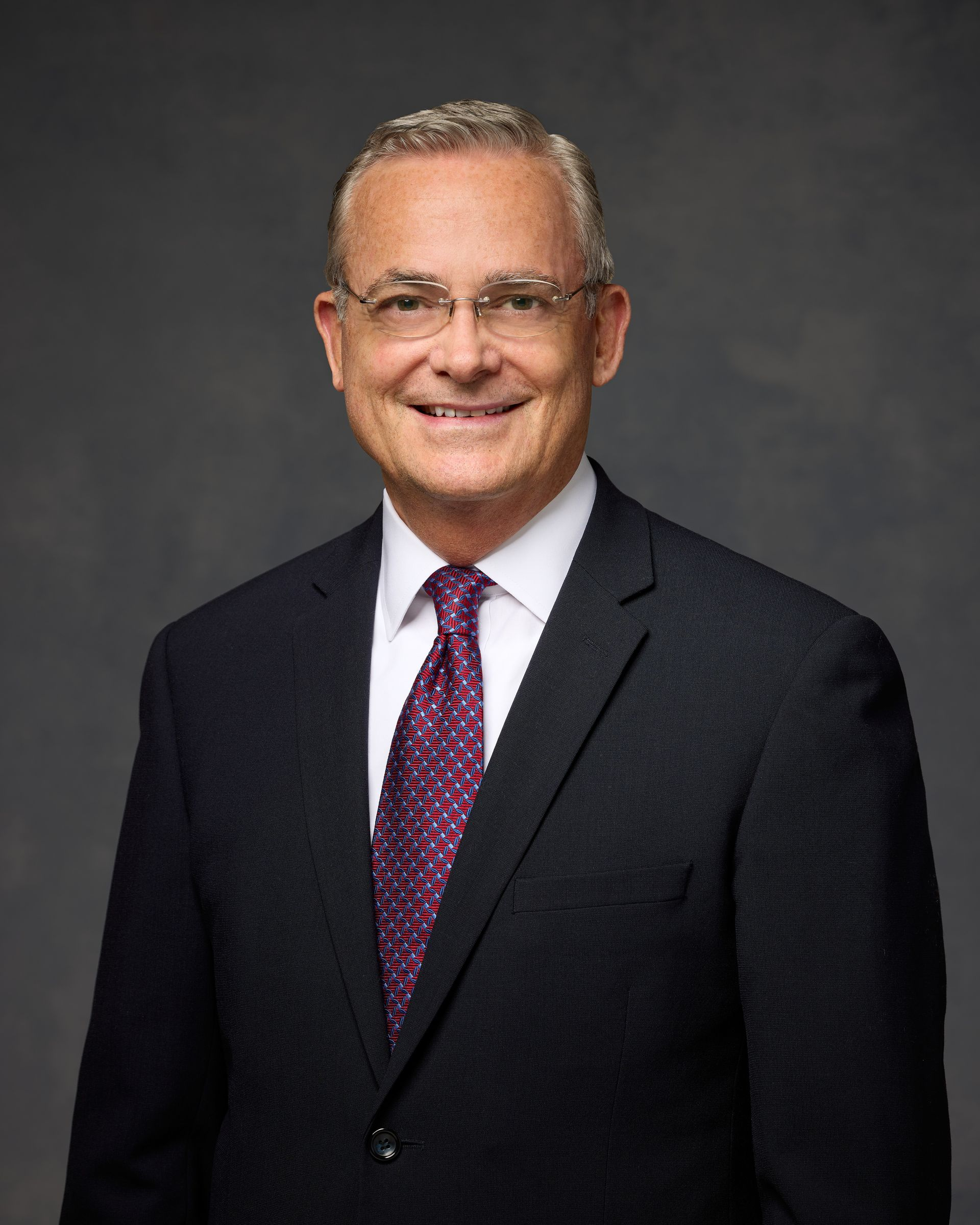

Quorum of the Twelve Apostles
- 7 December 2023
- Called by: Russell M. Nelson

LDS Church Apostle
- 7 December 2023
- Called by: Russell M. Nelson
- Reason: Death of M. Russell Ballard

Presidency of the Seventy
- 1 August 2017 – 7 December 2023
- Called by: Thomas S. Monson
- End reason: Called to the Quorum of the Twelve Apostles

First Quorum of the Seventy
- 3 April 2010 – 7 December 2023
- Called by: Thomas S. Monson
- End reason: Called to the Quorum of the Twelve Apostles

Personal details
- Born: Patrick Robert David Kearon; 18 July 1961 (age 65); Carlisle, England, United Kingdom
- Spouse(s): Jennifer Carole Hulme (m. 1991)
- Children: 4

Patrick Robert David Kearon (born 18 July 1961) is a British religious leader serving as a member of the Quorum of the Twelve Apostles of the Church of Jesus Christ of Latter-day Saints. He has been a church general authority since 2010 and was a member of the Presidency of the Seventy from August 2017 to December 2023. On 1 August 2020, Kearon became the senior president of the seventy, becoming the first in this role to have been born outside the United States since the reconstitution of the Presidency of the Seventy in 1975. As a member of the Quorum of the Twelve, Kearon is accepted by the church as a prophet, seer, and revelator. Currently, he is the thirteenth most senior apostle in the church.

== Early life and biography ==
Kearon was born on 18 July 1961 in Carlisle, England. He spent part of his youth in Saudi Arabia, where his father worked. After his father's death when Kearon was 19, he gave up on additional formal education and entered the workforce. His first job was working for a member of Parliament, and he later worked for Nestlé in England, Saudi Arabia, and the United States. He owned his own public affairs consulting company before beginning his full-time service in the church.

Kearon was first introduced to the church in the mid-1980s while staying with a Latter-day Saint family in Laguna, California. He has said that the family "lived a joyful existence founded on service." He met church missionaries in London several years later and began learning about the church. He was baptized on Christmas Eve, 1987.

== Church service ==
Prior to his call to full-time church service, Kearon's service included being president of the Bristol England Stake and area seventy.

At the time of his call as a general authority, Kearon was living in Clevedon, a town in North Somerset, England. In 2011, he was appointed as an assistant executive director of the church's priesthood and media services departments. From August 2012 to August 2015, he served as a counselor in the presidency of the church's Europe Area, before becoming the area's president in August 2015. In May 2017, it was announced that Kearon would become a member of the Presidency of the Seventy on August 1, with responsibility for the church's North America Northwest and North America West areas.

Kearon has been vocal on the topic of religious freedom, stating that "religious freedom means nothing if you protect your own religious practice while neglecting the practice of others, especially those who might be less secure and able to defend themselves. It only works if you protect the rights of everyone." In 2016, he addressed European Commission officials at a European Union summit asking for assistance during the refugee crisis. Kearon was quoted in a New York Times op-ed with regards to his work with refugees saying, “Their story is our story, not that many years ago.” While serving as president of the church's Europe Area, Kearon initiated programs to assist refugees in the area and also led out in the church working to support existing programs to help refugees.. A Latter-day Saint historian in Idaho talked about how previously it was controversial to donate to refugee programs in Idaho (which was attributed to a Fox News story), but a month after Kearon spoke on the subject there were five new refugee charities in Rexburg.

On 1 August 2020, Kearon became the senior president of the Seventy.

Prior to his appointment to the Quorum of the Twelve, Kearon spoke three times in general conference. In the first, in October 2010, he spoke of being healed spiritually through the atonement of Jesus Christ. He related a story of how he was stung by a scorpion as a child after he disregarded his parents' instruction to wear shoes in the Arabian desert and elected to wear flip flops instead. In April 2016, he spoke of church members' efforts to help refugees. In April 2022, he spoke to those who have survived abuse, violence, or oppression.

On 7 December 2023, he was called and ordained an apostle, then set apart as a member of the Quorum of the Twelve Apostles, filling a vacancy created by the death of M. Russell Ballard the prior month.

== Personal life ==
Kearon is married to Jennifer Carole Hulme. They met while Hulme was a student at Brigham Young University spending a semester studying abroad in London, and they were married in the Oakland California Temple in 1991. They have four children, the oldest of whom died from a heart condition at three weeks old.

The Church of Jesus Christ of Latter-day Saints titles
Preceded by Ulisses Soares	Quorum of the Twelve Apostles; December 7, 2023 –	Succeeded by Gérald Caussé
