= Bahía Blanca Argentina Temple =

LDS Church temple in Bahía Blanca, Argentina

- Interactive map of Bahía Blanca Argentina Temple
- Number: 211
- Dedication: 23 November 2025, by Ulisses Soares
- Site: 8 acres (3.2 ha)
- Floor area: 23,400 ft^{2} (2,170 m^{2})
- Official website • News & images

Church chronology
← Grand Junction Colorado Temple	Bahía Blanca Argentina Temple	→ Burley Idaho Temple

Additional information
- Announced: 5 April 2020, by Russell M. Nelson
- Groundbreaking: 9 April 2022, by Joaquin E. Costa
- Open house: 16 October-1 November 2025
- Current president: Horacio Paez
- Location: Bahía Blanca, Argentina
- Coordinates: 38°41′29″S 62°14′10″W
- Baptistries: 1
- Ordinance rooms: 2
- Sealing rooms: 2

The Bahía Blanca Argentina Temple is a temple of the Church of Jesus Christ of Latter-day Saints located in Bahía Blanca, Argentina. Announced by church president Russell M. Nelson on April 5, 2020, during general conference, it is the church's fifth temple in Argentina and the first in the country's southern region. The single-story temple has a domed steeple with stained-glass windows and a light-colored stone exterior, reflecting both traditional Latter-day Saint temple architecture and regional design influences. The temple is on an 8.14-acre site in the Aldea Romana neighborhood and also includes a 25,000-square-foot building to provide housing and services for patrons. Groundbreaking for the temple took place on April 9, 2022, under the direction of Joaquín E. Costa, a church general authority. A public open house was held from October 16 to November 1, 2025, with the temple then dedicated on November 23, 2025, by Ulisses Soares, of the Quorum of the Twelve Apostles.

== History ==
The Bahía Blanca Argentina Temple was announced by church president Russell M. Nelson on April 5, 2020, during general conference. It is the church's fifth temple in Argentina, following those in Buenos Aires, Córdoba, Salta, and Mendoza. It is the first in the southern region of the country. On February 9, 2022, the church announced that the temple would be constructed on an 8.14-acre (3.29 ha) property at the intersection of Avenida Alberto Pedro Cabrera and Luis Vera in the Aldea Romana neighborhood of Bahía Blanca. Preliminary plans called for a single-story structure of approximately 19,000 square feet (1,800 m²). Additionally, a 25,000-square-foot (2,300 m²) ancillary building was planned to include patron housing and a distribution center.

A groundbreaking ceremony took place on April 9, 2022, marking the commencement of construction. with Joaquín E. Costa, a general authority, presiding, and attended by local church members and community leaders.

During construction, the church coordinated with local authorities to ensure compliance with building regulations and to maintain safety standards for workers. The Secretary General of the Union of Construction Workers of Argentina for Bahía Blanca visited the construction site, emphasizing the importance of safe working conditions.

As construction neared completion, the church announced the public open house that was held from October 16 to November 1, 2025, excluding Sundays. Ahead of that, a media day was held on October 14, with invited guests touring the building on October 14–15. The temple was dedicated on November 23, 2025, by Ulisses Soares, of the Quorum of the Twelve Apostles.

== Design and architecture ==
The temple is on an 8.14-acre (3.29 ha) plot in the Aldea Romana neighborhood of Bahía Blanca. Landscaping on the grounds includes flowers, lawns of grass, and other plants.

The single-story structure is approximately 19,000 square feet (1,800 m²). It has a central two-level steeple with a domed cupola. The steeple uses eight stained-glass windows, providing a visual focal point above the temple.

The temple has two instruction rooms, two sealing rooms, and a baptistry. Interior finishes include stone baseboards, wood trim, decorative moldings, and hand-stenciled ceiling designs.

== Temple presidents ==
The church's temples are directed by a temple president and matron, each typically serving for a term of three years. The president and matron oversee the administration of temple operations and provide guidance and training for both temple patrons and staff. Horacio A. Páez is the first president, with Sonia A. Páez serving as matron.

== Admittance ==
On April 14, 2025, the church announced the public open house to be held from October 16 to November 1, 2025 (excluding Sundays). The temple was dedicated by Ulisses Soares of the Quorum of the Twelve Apostles on November 23, 2025.

Like all the church's temples, it is not used for Sunday worship services. To members of the church, temples are regarded as sacred houses of the Lord. Once dedicated, only church members with a current temple recommend can enter for worship.

== See also ==
- The Church of Jesus Christ of Latter-day Saints in Argentina
- Comparison of temples of The Church of Jesus Christ of Latter-day Saints
- List of temples of The Church of Jesus Christ of Latter-day Saints
- List of temples of The Church of Jesus Christ of Latter-day Saints by geographic region
- Temple architecture (Latter-day Saints)
