= Denver Colorado Temple =

Temple in the USA, Colorado

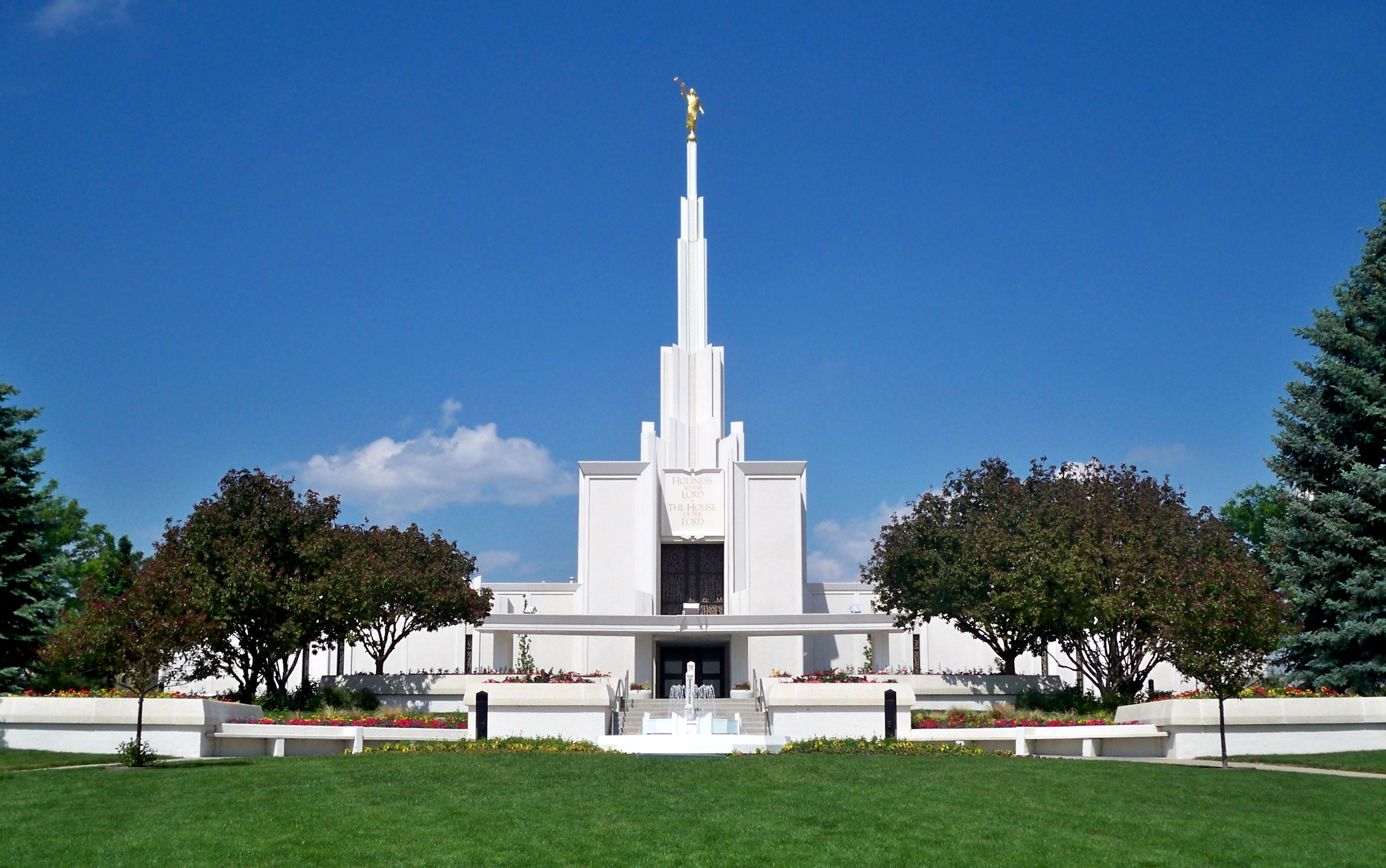
- Interactive map of Denver Colorado Temple
- Number: 40
- Dedication: October 24, 1986, by Ezra Taft Benson
- Site: 7.5 acres (3.0 ha)
- Floor area: 29,177 ft^{2} (2,710.6 m^{2})
- Height: 90 ft (27 m)
- Official website • News & images

Church chronology
← Buenos Aires Argentina Temple	Denver Colorado Temple	→ Frankfurt Germany Temple

Additional information
- Announced: March 31, 1982, by Spencer W. Kimball
- Groundbreaking: May 19, 1984, by Gordon B. Hinckley
- Open house: September 8–27, 1986
- Current president: Allen L. Paulsen
- Designed by: Church A&E Services and Bobby R. Thomas
- Location: Centennial, Colorado, United States
- Coordinates: 39°34′7.3″N 104°57′56.8″W
- Exterior finish: Precast stone walls and a built-up roof
- Design: Modern, single-spire design
- Baptistries: 1
- Ordinance rooms: 4 (stationary)
- Sealing rooms: 6
- Clothing rental: Yes

The Denver Colorado Temple is the 40th operating temple of the Church of Jesus Christ of Latter-day Saints located in Centennial, Colorado. The intent to build the temple was announced in a news conference on March 31, 1982, by Gordon B. Hinckley, then a counselor in the church’s First Presidency, representing church president Spencer W. Kimball. The temple was the first constructed in Colorado.

The temple features a single spire, approximately 90 feet high, with a gold-leafed statue of the angel Moroni. Designed by the church’s architectural department, with Bobby R. Thomas as supervising architect, it uses a modern, minimalistic style characteristic of those constructed by the church in the 1980s. A groundbreaking ceremony, marking the beginning of construction, was held on May 19, 1984, with Hinckley conducting.

== History ==
The intent to build the temple was announced on March 31, 1982, by Gordon B. Hinckley, a counselor in the First Presidency. A groundbreaking ceremony took place on May 19, 1984, with Hinckley presiding. This ceremony marked commencement of construction and was attended by church members and local community leaders.

Prior to the construction of the temple, residents were worried a temple in their area would be too big and overshadow everything else. The church let the residents of the neighborhood surrounding the temple grounds pick the final design of the temple.

After construction was completed, a public open house was held from September 8 to September 27, 1986, allowing the community to tour the temple and learn about its purposes. The open house attracted approximately 140,000 visitors. The temple was dedicated on October 24, 1986, by church president Ezra Taft Benson.

In 1997, the temple was celebrated as part of the 100th-anniversary celebration of the church's presence in Colorado. The ceremony went through the history of the church members in the area, starting with pioneer crossing to the west, early missionaries, the church through World War II, and a celebration of the temple's construction. In 2016, a temple Fort Collins, became the state's second.

In 2020, like all the church's others, the Denver Colorado Temple was closed for a time in response to the COVID-19 pandemic.

== Design and architecture ==
The temple is on a 7.56-acre site in Centennial, Colorado, and is surrounded by landscaped grounds that enhance its peaceful environment.

The temple has an architectural style and design elements characteristic of Latter-day Saint temples from the 1980s. Its exterior has modern design elements with precast stone walls and a built-up roof. A spire rises above the entrance.

Inside, the temple encompasses 27,006 square feet, and includes a baptistry, four ordinance rooms, and six sealing rooms. The interior has detailed carved walnut, hand-painted motifs on the walls and ceilings, cherry-wood trim, Swiss wall coverings, and gold-leaf work performed by Danish craftsmen. The temple also features more than six hundred square feet of specially designed stained glass windows. These elements contribute to a sacred and inviting atmosphere, reflecting the temple's spiritual significance to church members.

Many church members contributed what they could to the building and beautifying of the temple. Some made tatted cloths, children earned money and donated it for the building of three 'bride benches,' young men and women made and assembled a dollhouse to be used in the youth center, and more than six hundred volunteers cleaned the temple before the open house held September 8–27, 1986.

== Temple presidents ==
The church's temples are directed by a temple president and matron, each serving for a term of three years. The president and matron oversee the administration of temple operations and provide guidance and training for both temple patrons and staff.

Serving from 1986 to 1989, the first president was Raymond A. Kimball, with Adrus H. Kimball serving as matron. As of 2025, Allen L. Paulsen is the president, with Sara T. Paulsen as matron.

== Admittance ==
During the public open house held from September 8 to September 27, 1986, approximately 140,000 visitors toured the temple.

Like all the church's temples, it is not used for Sunday worship services. To members of the church, temples are regarded as sacred houses of the Lord. Once dedicated, only church members with a current temple recommend can enter for worship.

== Gallery ==
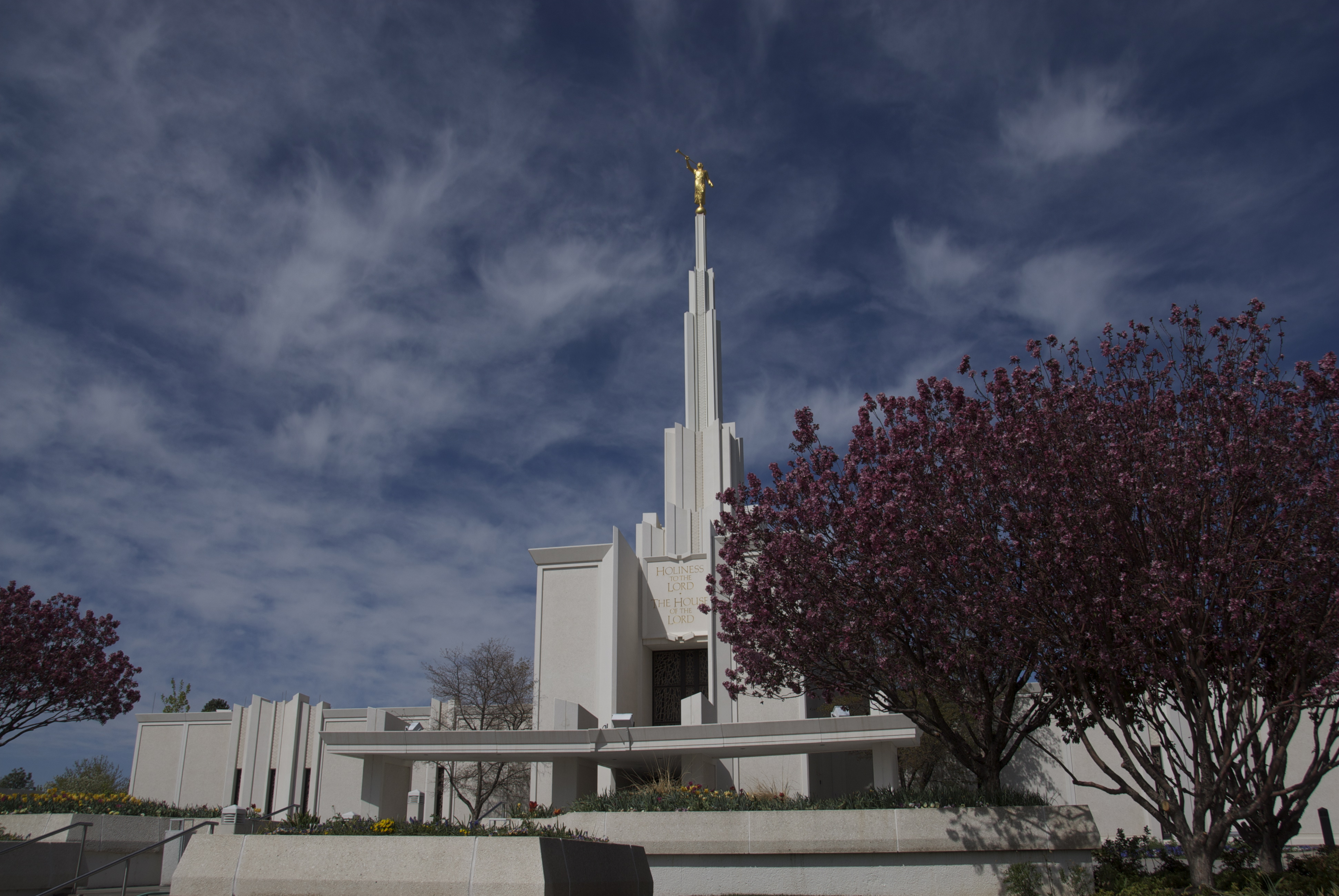

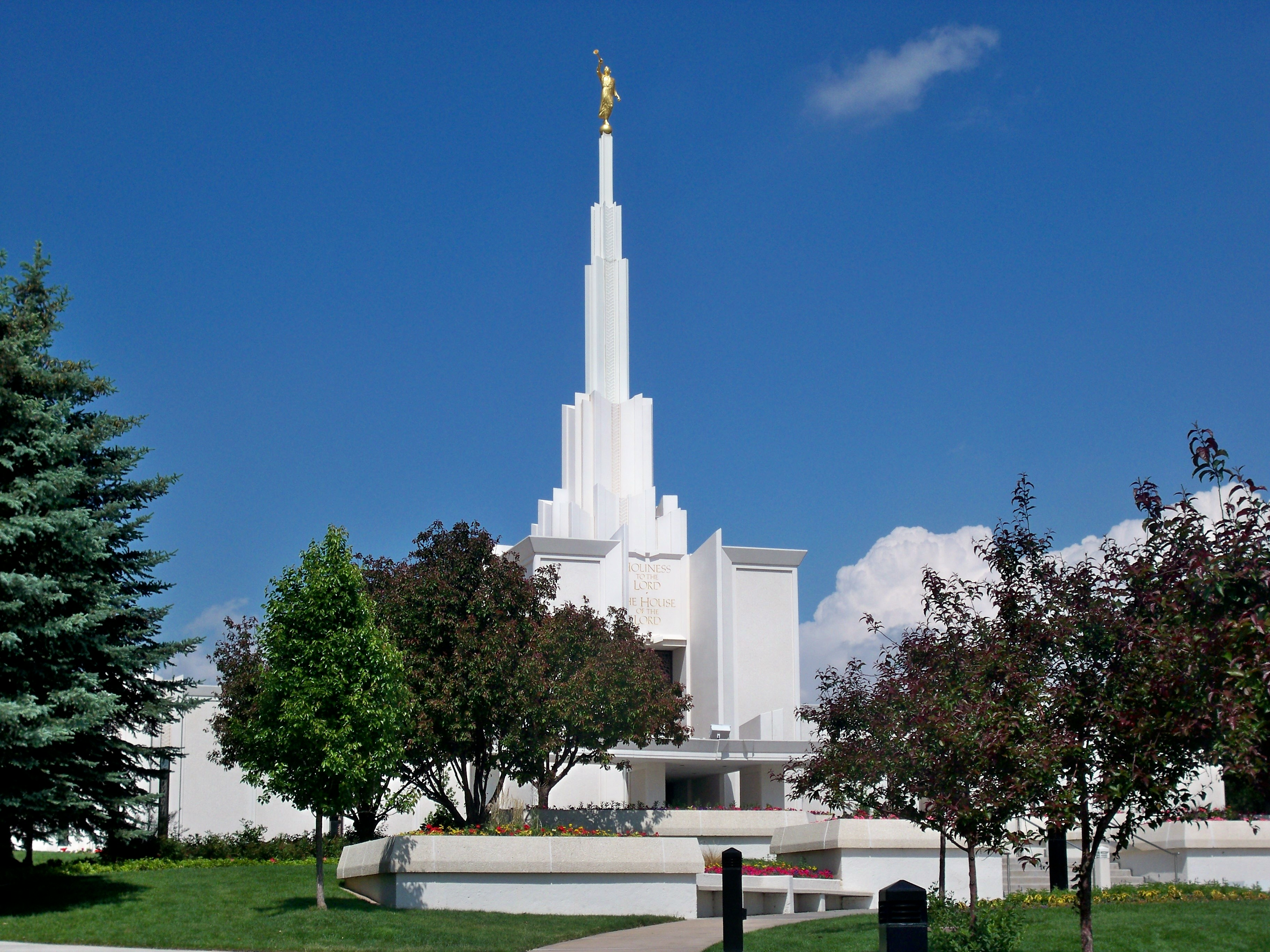

== See also ==
Temples in Colorado
- = Operating
- = Under construction
- = Announced
- = Temporarily Closed

- Comparison of temples of The Church of Jesus Christ of Latter-day Saints
- List of temples of The Church of Jesus Christ of Latter-day Saints
- List of temples of The Church of Jesus Christ of Latter-day Saints by geographic region
- Temple architecture (Latter-day Saints)
- The Church of Jesus Christ of Latter-day Saints in Colorado
