= Salta Argentina Temple =

Planned temple of The Church of Jesus Christ of Latter-day Saints in Salta, Argentina

- Interactive map of Salta Argentina Temple
- Number: 194
- Dedication: 16 June 2024, by D. Todd Christofferson
- Site: 17.72 acres (7.17 ha)
- Floor area: 27,000 ft^{2} (2,500 m^{2})
- Official website • News & images

Church chronology
← Cobán Guatemala Temple	Salta Argentina Temple	→ Layton Utah Temple

Additional information
- Announced: 1 April 2018, by Russell M. Nelson
- Groundbreaking: 4 November 2020, by Benjamin De Hoyos
- Open house: May 3 to May 18, 2024
- Current president: Guillermo Francisco De Sousa
- Location: Salta, Argentina
- Coordinates: 24°50′14″S 65°28′12″W
- Baptistries: 1
- Ordinance rooms: 2
- Sealing rooms: 2

The Salta Argentina Temple is a temple of the Church of Jesus Christ of Latter-day Saints in Salta, Argentina. The intent to build the temple was announced on April 1, 2018, by church president Russell M. Nelson, during general conference. The temple is the third in Argentina, following the Buenos Aires Argentina and Córdoba Argentina temples, and the first in the province of Salta. A groundbreaking ceremony, to signify beginning of construction, was held on November 4, 2020, conducted by Benjamín De Hoyos, a church general authority.

== History ==
The intent to construct the temple was announced by church president Russell M. Nelson on April 1, 2018, concurrently with 6 other temples. At the time, the number of operating or announced temples was 189.

On November 4, 2020, a groundbreaking to signify beginning of construction was held, with Benjamín De Hoyos, president of the church's South America South Area, presiding. The groundbreaking was originally scheduled for August 15, 2020, but was postponed and then had limited in-person attendance, due to the COVID-19 pandemic.

Following completion of the temple, a public open house was held from May 3-18, 2024. The Salta Argentina Temple was dedicated on June 16, 2024, by D. Todd Christofferson, of the Quorum of the Twelve Apostles.

== Design and architecture ==
The temple's architecture reflects both the cultural landscape of Salta and its spiritual significance to the church, using the heritage of the Salta region as well as local environment and cultural motifs.

The temple sits on a 17.66- acre plot in southern Salta, across from the airport. An accommodation center, a meetinghouse, and a residence for the temple president and matron were also built on the site.

The temple has a central tower topped with a statue of the angel Moroni The single-story structure is 100 feet tall, constructed with Portuguese Moleanos stone cladding. The exterior is characterized by its multi-arch entrance and central tower topped with a domed cupola.

The interior uses design elements based on local environment and cultural motifs, with a color palette of blue, green, yellow, red, and ocher. The temple includes two instruction rooms, two sealing rooms, and a baptistry, each arranged for ceremonial use.

The design uses elements representing the heritage of the Salta region, providing deeper spiritual meaning to the temple's appearance and function. Symbolism is important to church members and includes the design’s use of both the Cardon cactus flower and the “guarda pampa” pattern. “Guarda pampa” refers to a geometric pattern that often appears in Argentinian textiles, as well as regional costumes and handicrafts.

== Temple president ==
The church's temples are directed by a temple president and matron, each serving for a term of three years. The president and matron oversee the administration of temple operations and provide guidance and training for both temple patrons and staff. Since its 2024 dedication, the president and matron of the Salta Argentina Temple are Guillermo F. De Sousa and Mercedes E. De Sousa.

== Admittance ==
Following the temple’s completion, a public open house was held from May 3-18, 2024 (excluding Sundays). The temple was dedicated in two sessions by D. Todd Christofferson on June 16, 2024.

Like all the church's temples, it is not used for Sunday worship services. To members of the church, temples are regarded as sacred houses of the Lord. Once dedicated, only church members with a current temple recommend can enter for worship.

== See also ==

Temples in and near Argentina
= Operating
= Under construction
= Announced
= Temporarily Closed

- List of temples of The Church of Jesus Christ of Latter-day Saints
- List of temples of The Church of Jesus Christ of Latter-day Saints by geographic region
- The Church of Jesus Christ of Latter-day Saints in Argentina
- Comparison of temples of The Church of Jesus Christ of Latter-day Saints
- Temple architecture (Latter-day Saints)
