= Grand Junction Colorado Temple =

Temple of the Church of Jesus Christ of Latter-day Saints

- Interactive map of Grand Junction Colorado Temple
- Number: 210
- Dedication: 19 October 2025, by Jeffrey R. Holland
- Site: 7.93 acres (3.21 ha)
- Floor area: 29,630 ft^{2} (2,753 m^{2})
- Official website • News & images

Church chronology
← Elko Nevada Temple	Grand Junction Colorado Temple	→ Bahía Blanca Argentina Temple

Additional information
- Announced: 4 April 2021, by Russell M. Nelson
- Groundbreaking: 16 April 2022, by Chi Hong (Sam) Wong
- Open house: 11-27 September 2025
- Current president: Allan Allphin
- Location: Grand Junction, Colorado, United States
- Coordinates: 39°06′05″N 108°33′05″W
- Baptistries: 1
- Ordinance rooms: 2
- Sealing rooms: 2

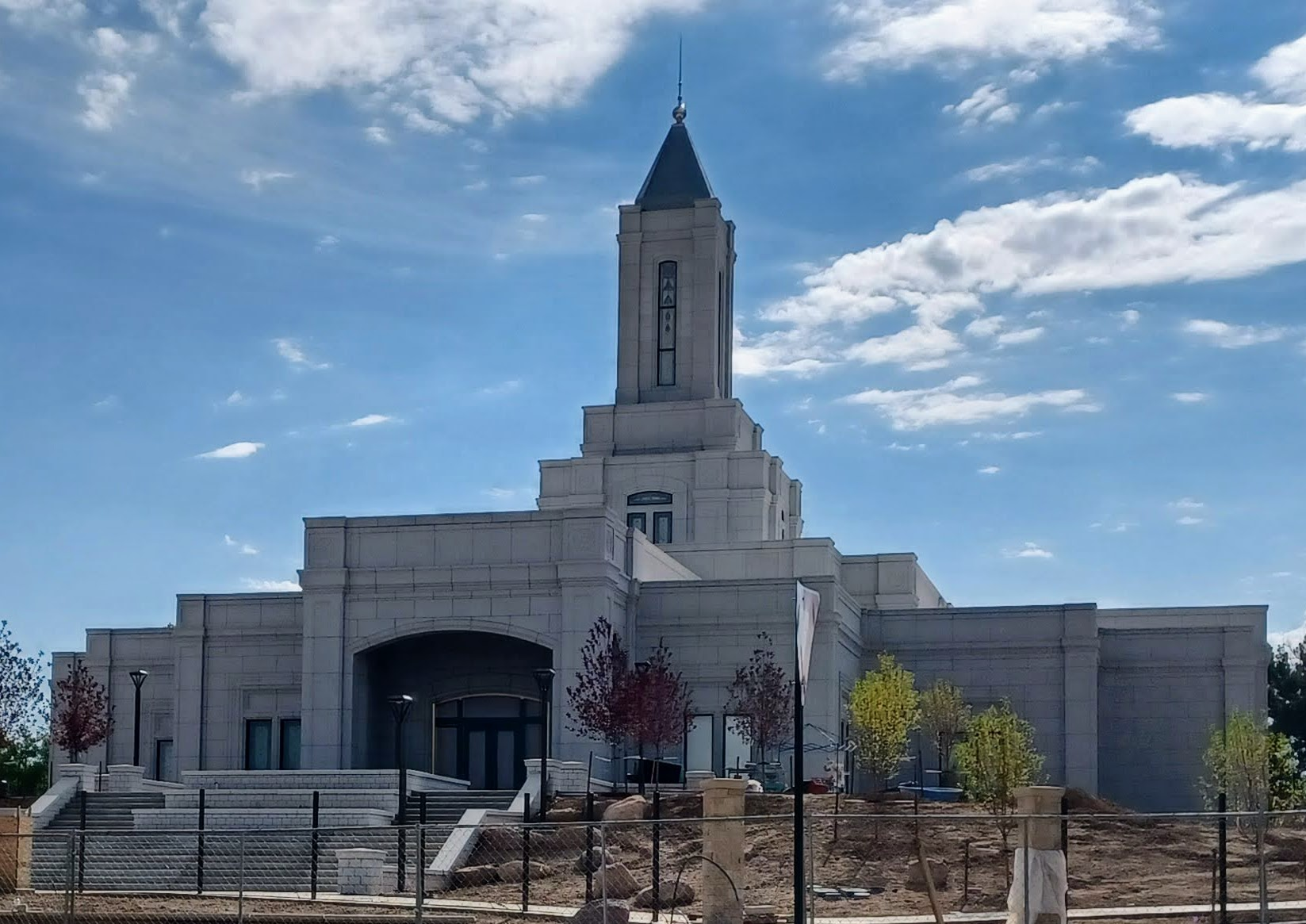

The Grand Junction Colorado Temple is a temple of the Church of Jesus Christ of Latter-day Saints in Grand Junction, Colorado. Announced in April 2021 by church president Russell M. Nelson, the temple is on a 6.94-acre site at Horizon Drive and North 12th Street in Grand Junction. The building uses a single-story layout with a central spire, and the exterior has granite from Portugal. A groundbreaking was held on April 16, 2022. With construction completed a public open house was held from September 11–27, 2025. The temple was dedicated on October 19, 2025, by Jeffrey R. Holland.

== History ==
The Grand Junction Colorado Temple was announced by Russell M. Nelson during the church's April 2021 general conference. A groundbreaking ceremony took place on April 16, 2022, with Chi Hong (Sam) Wong, a church general authority, presiding. The event, which was livestreamed locally, was attended by local church members, community representatives, and members of other faiths.

The temple is on a 6.94 acres (2.81 ha) site at the intersection of Horizon Drive and North 12th Street in Grand Junction. The building is a single-story structure of approximately 29,000 square feet (2,700 m^{2}).

During construction, several challenges were encountered. The land was primarily shale, which prevented the use of standard footings. To resolve this, 206 piers were drilled 25 feet into the ground to support the temple, which stabilized the foundation above the shale. Additional challenges included material supply chain delays and labor shortages common during the COVID-19 pandemic. It is the church's third temple in Colorado.

== Design and architecture ==
The temple is on a 6.94-acre plot at 12th Street and Horizon Drive in Grand Junction. The single-story structure has a single spire and the exterior uses granite imported from Portugal. The temple has two ordinance rooms, two sealing rooms, and a baptistry.

The temple will reduce travel time for church members in western Colorado, who previously had to travel long distances to Utah or other parts of Colorado. Local members have described the temple as a long-anticipated development. According to media reports, some members expressed strong enthusiasm for the temple, describing it as a fulfillment of a long-held hope.

== Temple practices and access ==
The church's temples are directed by a temple president and matron, each typically serving for a term of three years. The president and matron oversee the administration of temple operations and provide guidance and training for both temple patrons and staff. Allan L. Allphin is the first president, with Diane P. Allphin serving as matron.

On April 8, 2025, the church announced the public open house that was held from September 11 to 27, 2025 (excluding Sundays). The temple was dedicated on October 19, 2025.

Like all the church's temples, it is not used for Sunday worship services. To members of the church, temples are regarded as sacred houses of the Lord. Once dedicated, only church members with a current temple recommend can enter for worship.

== See also ==
- The Church of Jesus Christ of Latter-day Saints in Colorado
- Comparison of temples of The Church of Jesus Christ of Latter-day Saints
- List of temples of The Church of Jesus Christ of Latter-day Saints
- List of temples of The Church of Jesus Christ of Latter-day Saints by geographic region
- Temple architecture (Latter-day Saints)
