= Layton Utah Temple =

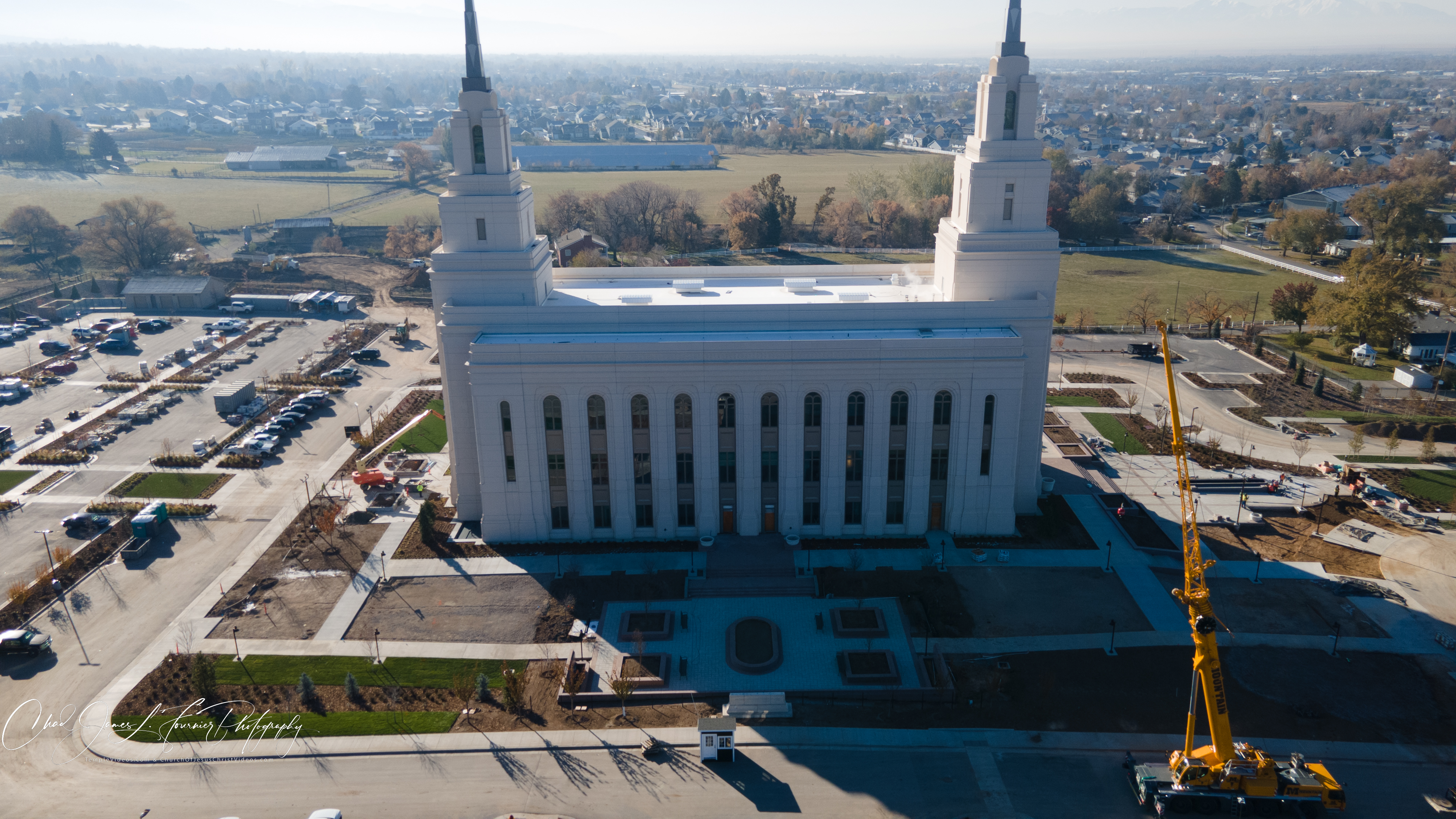
- Interactive map of Layton Utah Temple
- Number: 195
- Dedication: 16 June 2024, by David A. Bednar
- Site: 11.8 acres (4.8 ha)
- Floor area: 93,539 ft^{2} (8,690.1 m^{2})
- Official website • News & images

Church chronology
← Salta Argentina Temple	Layton Utah Temple	→ Pittsburgh Pennsylvania Temple

Additional information
- Announced: 1 April 2018, by Russell M. Nelson
- Groundbreaking: 23 May 2020, by Craig C. Christensen
- Open house: 19 April to 1 June 2024
- Location: Layton, Utah, United States
- Coordinates: 41.062232°N 111.940251°W

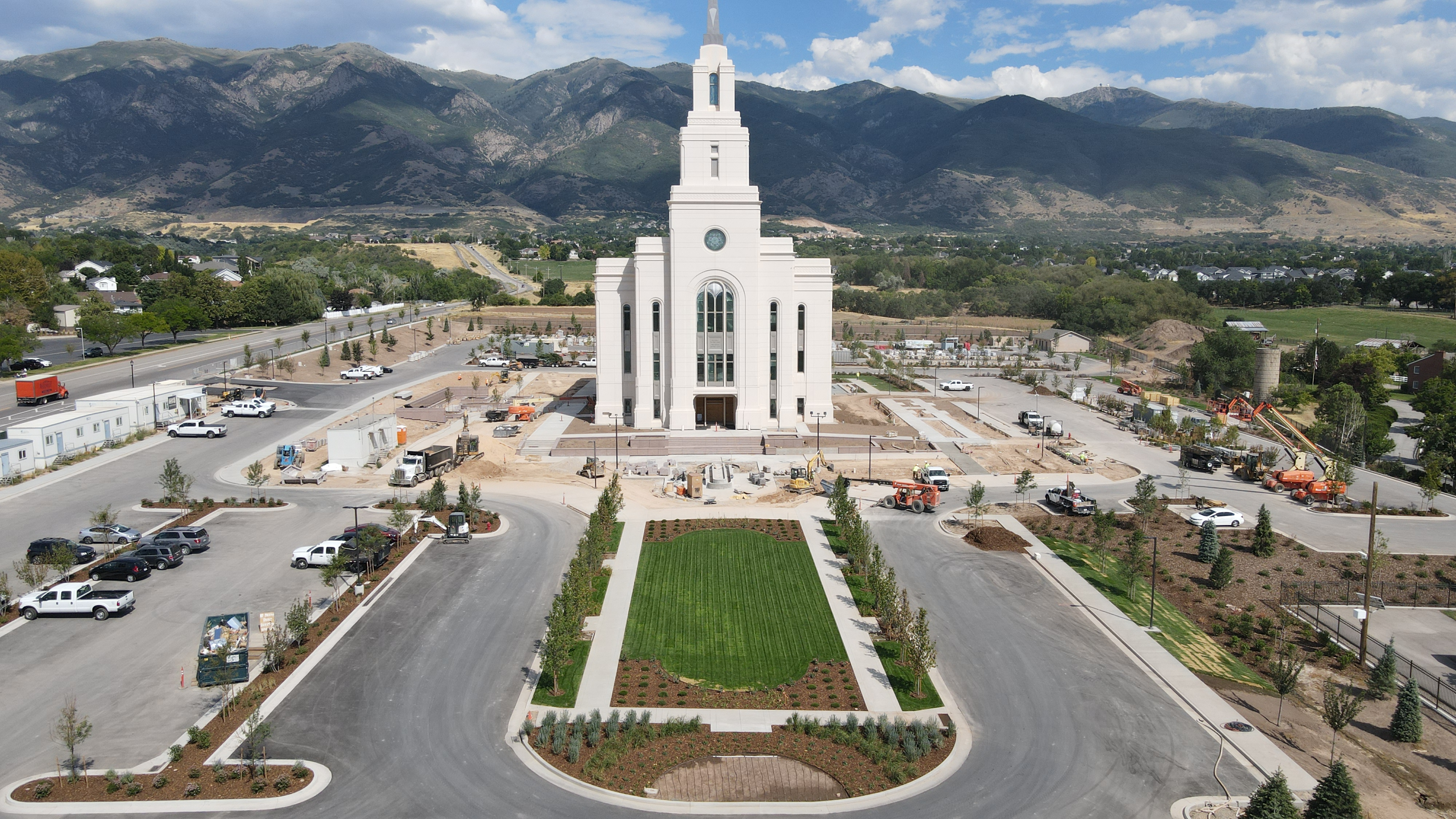
Layton Utah Temple

The Layton Utah Temple is a temple of the Church of Jesus Christ of Latter-day Saints in Layton, Utah. The intent to construct the temple was announced by church president Russell M. Nelson on April 1, 2018, during the 188th general conference. The Layton Utah Temple was announced concurrently with 6 other temples. At the time, the number of total operating or announced temples was 189. It is the 22nd temple in Utah and the second temple in Davis County.

The temple has twin spires, arched windows, and a statue of the angel Moroni. A groundbreaking ceremony, marking the beginning of construction, was held on May 23, 2020. The temple was dedicated by David A. Bednar on June 16, 2024.

== History ==
The temple was announced by Russell M. Nelson on April 1, 2018 during the church's 188th semi-annual general conference. On July 15, 2019, the church announced that the temple would be constructed on an 11.8-acre property located at the corner of Oak Hills Drive and Rosewood Lane on the southeast side of Layton. The preliminary plans called for a three-story structure of more than 87,000 square feet. The parcel of land belonged to one family for over a hundred years. It was settled in the 1850s by an immigrant who traveled from England to the United States and into Utah after converting to the church. The family sold the land to the church shortly before the temple was announced. On October 8, 2019, the church released a rendering of the temple.

On January 23, 2020, the church announced that a groundbreaking, to signify the beginning of construction, was scheduled for May 30, 2020. However, due to the COVID-19 pandemic, a small-scale, private groundbreaking occurred on May 23, 2020, with Craig C. Christensen, president of the church's Utah Area, presiding. The church then provided photographs and video of the groundbreaking on the originally scheduled date.

On December 11, 2023, the church announced that a public open house would be held from April 19 to June 1, 2024 (excluding Sundays). The temple was dedicated by David A. Bednar of the church's Quorum of the Twelve Apostles on June 16, 2024.

The temple will serve as a center of spiritual growth, playing a vital role in the lives of church members in the region. It is the 22nd temple built in Utah and is the second temple in Davis County, besides the Bountiful Utah Temple. A third is currently under construction in Syracuse.

Queen Nompumelelo Mchiza Zulu of the Zulu nation in South Africa privately toured the temple on March 27, 2024, with Melanie Rasband. This continued the queen's ongoing relationship with the church, including the opening of the Durban South Africa Temple, which was dedicated by Ronald A. Rasband in 2020. She had then accompanied her now late husband, King Goodwill Zwelithini. The queen's temple visit was part of a broader itinerary that included church interface in meeting with its leaders, touring a Deseret Industries, and a Tabernacle Choir performance.

== Design and architecture ==
The temple was designed by the architectural firm Naylor Wentworth Lund Architects, showcasing traditional temple architecture of the church and reflecting the cultural heritage of the Davis County area. For instance, Layton's agricultural history inspired the stained-glass windows which depict a seedling growing into a fruit tree.

The temple is three stories tall, nearly 94,000 square feet, and is constructed with concrete. The exterior features two spires and a statue of the angel Moroni, while the walls include stained glass. Incorporated into the design are symbolic elements such as the use of a cherry tree motif, which represents Davis County’s history of fruit production. The landscaping around the temple includes gardens.

== Open house and dedication ==
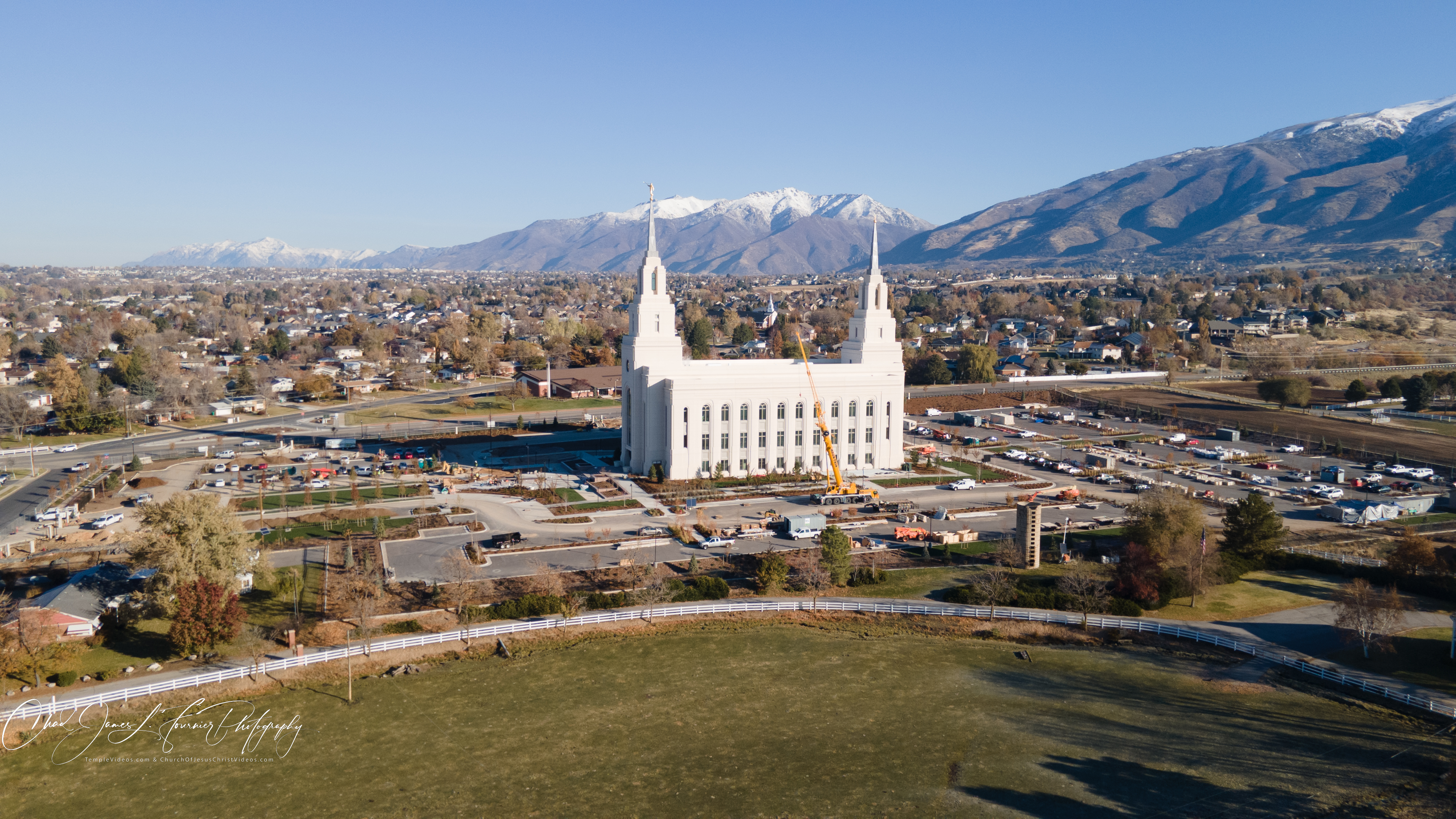
Layton Temple from a distance

A six-week public open house occurred from April 19 through June 1, 2024 (excluding Sundays). The dedication took place on June 16, 2024, after which entry into the temple was limited to those holding a valid temple recommend.

== Temple president ==
Like all the church's temples, Layton's is overseen by a temple president and temple matron. The first president is Jay R. Bangerter, with Kathleen R. Bangerter serving as matron.

== See also ==
Temples in Utah
Wasatch Front Temples
Temples along the Wasatch Front
- = Operating
- = Under construction
- = Announced
- = Temporarily Closed

- The Church of Jesus Christ of Latter-day Saints in Utah
- Comparison of temples of The Church of Jesus Christ of Latter-day Saints
- List of temples of The Church of Jesus Christ of Latter-day Saints
- List of temples of The Church of Jesus Christ of Latter-day Saints by geographic region
- Temple architecture (Latter-day Saints)
