= The Church of Jesus Christ of Latter-day Saints in Argentina =

Church in Buenos Aires, Argentina

- (Logo in Spanish)

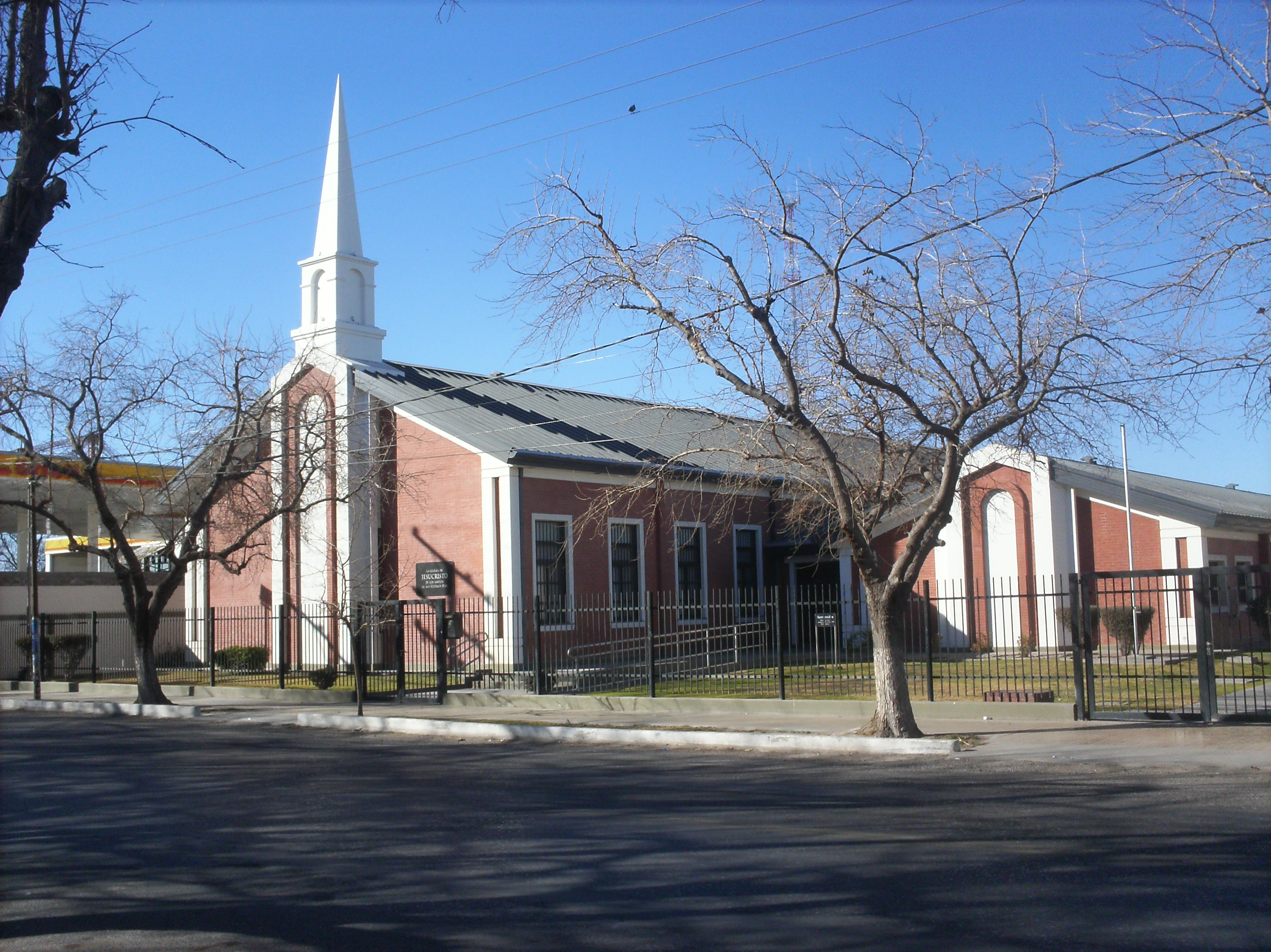
- A meetinghouse of the Church of Jesus Christ of Latter-day Saints in Chimbas Department, San Juan Province, Argentina
- Area: South America South
- Members: 505,819 (2025)
- Stakes: 80
- Districts: 25
- Wards: 506
- Branches: 236
- Total congregations: 742
- Missions: 14
- Temples: 5 operating; 0 under construction; 2 announced; 7 total
- FamilySearch Centers: 194

The Church of Jesus Christ of Latter-day Saints (LDS Church) (Spanish: La Iglesia de Jesucristo de los Santos de los Últimos Días) was established in Argentina in 1925 when Melvin J. Ballard arrived in Buenos Aires and opened the church's South American Mission.

K.B. Reinhold Stoof became the first president of the South American Mission in July 1926. Missionary work largely focused on populations of German immigrants (see German Argentines). After Stoof's release in 1935, the South American Mission split into the Brazilian Mission and the Argentine Mission. During World War II, missionaries were required to leave Argentina but then re-entered in 1947. The Argentine Mission divided again in 1962 and the first stake in Argentina was established in 1966 in Buenos Aires. The Buenos Aires Argentina Temple was dedicated on January 17, 1986, becoming the church's first temple in Argentina.

With 505,819 members at year-end 2024, Argentina ranks as having the 4th most members of the LDS Church in South America and 7th worldwide. Membership grew by 22% between 2011 and 2021.

== Beginnings ==
Membership in Argentina
Year	Members
1940	518
1950	1,031
1960	3,456
1970	19,454
1980	60,972
1989*	153,000
1999	288,865
2009	380,669
2019	470,843
2025	505,819
*Membership was published as a rounded number. Source: Windall J. Ashton; Jim M. Wall, Deseret News, various years, Church Almanac Country Information: Argentina

LDS Church president Heber J. Grant wanted to send missionaries to Argentina, so he sent Andrew Jenson on a trip to Argentina in 1923 in order to determine where missionaries may be successful. The church's general authorities wanted to be slow and cautious in their attempt to send missionaries into South America, because once the mission was established, they wanted it to stay. They didn't want to repeat what happened with the LDS Church in Japan, where the Japanese Mission had to be closed in 1924. In 1925, a group of German members of the LDS Church immigrated to Argentina. Among these was Wilhelm Friedrichs and Emil Hoppe and their families who were escaping post-World War I Germany. In Argentina, Friedrichs and Hoppe published religious messages in newspapers. In 1924, they asked the First Presidency to send missionaries to the German immigrants in Argentina. Friedrichs wanted the First Presidency to send missionaries was because Friedrichs said it was difficult to meet people in their homes and Friedrichs did not have the Melchizedek Priesthood so he could not baptize anyone. Despite this, Friedrichs wrote in newspapers to explain Church teachings and invite people to meetings in his or Hoppe's home.

In fall 1925, the LDS Church announced that Melvin J. Ballard, an LDS apostle, along with Rulon S. Wells and Rey Pratt, would be traveling to Buenos Aires to establish missionary work in South America. Wells spoke fluent German and Pratt, who was currently serving as president of the Mexican Mission, was knowledgeable in Spanish and Latin culture. They arrived in Buenos Aires on December 6, 1925. The first baptisms in South America were Anna Kullick and Ernst Biebersdorf and their families, along with two other young women, all German immigrants. They were baptized on December 12, 1925, in the Rio de la Plata. Language was a challenge for the missionaries. Church talks needed to be translated from English to Spanish to German. Furthermore, the missionaries found it difficult to decide where to proselyte.

== Establishment of the mission ==
The LDS Church was officially established on December 25, 1925, as the South American Mission. The mission was dedicated by Ballard in Tres de Febrero Park in Buenos Aires. For about 6 months, Ballard, Wells, and Pratt served as missionaries in Argentina. They presented lectures and slideshows about Ancient American ruins, Latter-day Saint history, or Salt Lake City. Having little success in Buenos Aires, they tried to teach in Liniers. Herta Klara Kullick, daughter of Anna and Jakob Kullick, quickly learned Spanish and brought over 100 of her friends to listen to the missionaries. In May 1926, the missionaries began to hold Sunday school for them. Baptisms followed in June. Pratt believed that missionary work should focus on Spanish speaking population.

In July 1926, K.B. Reinhold Stoof became president of the South American Mission. Ballard, Wells, and Pratt remained in Argentina for about a month after Stoof arrived. Initially, missionaries had little success. Even though Stoof did not speak Spanish, he brought a Spanish speaking missionary with him, J. Vernon Clark, to maintain missionary work with Spanish-speaking people. Stoof, however, "felt deep in his heart" that he needed to work with German immigrants. Later, Stoof realized that the German immigrant populations in Argentina were too scattered and he focused missionaries on Spanish-speaking and Italian-speaking populations. During Stoof's nine-year presidency, branches were created in Buenos Aires and other cities, focusing on German immigrants. Stoof never mastered the Spanish language, and there was a tension between Stoof's desire to preach to Germans and the missionaries' desire to preach to Spanish-speakers. Stoof also wanted to carry on the wishes of Ballard to preach to the native populations, though Stoof struggled to do this successfully in Northern Argentina. Moreover, Stoof did not have enough missionaries to proselyte. During his presidency, there were only 50 missionaries to work in the South American Mission, split between Brazil and Argentina. There were 96 baptisms in from 1926 to 1931, 50 were German immigrants, 32 were Spanish-speaking, and 11 were Italian immigrants. By the end of 1928, only one family of those who were baptized were not immigrants. The mission was expanded in 1930, when missionaries were sent to Rosario.

In 1935, the South American Mission was divided into the Brazilian Mission and the Argentine Mission. There were 192 members of the LDS Church in Argentina by 1935. W. Ernest Young became the first president of the Argentine Mission, with stewardship for 14 missionaries and 255 church members. Young served from 1935 to 1938. Although there was a German-speaking branch in Buenos Aires, both missionary work and church meetings were in Spanish. Missionaries changed focus from German immigrants to Spanish speakers. In 1938, Frederick S. Williams became the president of the Argentine Mission. In 1938, there were 66 baptisms performed among the 45 missionaries. There were 438 members. Church meetings were held in 20 rented halls because the church did not yet own land in Argentina where they could build church buildings. The first LDS chapel built in Argentina was in Liniers in Buenos Aires. It was dedicated on April 9, 1939. This was also the first LDS chapel in South America. Branches were established in other cities, including Quilmes, La Plata, Rosario, Santa Fe, Bahía Blanca, Córdoba, and Mendoza. Williams used sports and musical events to give the LDS Church public and media attention. By 1940, the number of members of the LDS Church in Argentina had more than tripled from 1935 with church membership at nearly 600. From 1938 to 1941, the number of missionaries sent to Argentina doubled because World War II reduced the number of missionaries being sent to Europe. This caused Argentina to stop granted visas to missionaries. As a result, missionary work in Argentina slowed. In 1942, every missionary except for three was required to leave the country due to World War II. James Barker was the next president of the Argentine Mission, but he presided over a mission void of missionaries. Barker struggled to visit and maintain the administrative aspects of the LDS Church. Many branches closed.

== Post World War II development ==
After World War II, Young again became president Argentina mission, though the mission still did not have missionaries. Young traveled to check on branches in Argentina. LDS Church membership increased from 597 in 1940 to 801 in 1945. Despite the lack of experienced missionaries and a mission housing shortage in 1947, 29 missionaries were sent to Argentina. Many of the missionaries were ex-servicemen from World War II and were "mature" and "disciplined". In 1949, LDS Church membership was 1,000 in 27 branches, yet missionaries provided most of the ecclesiastical leadership. That same year, Harold Brown became the new president of the Argentine Mission, fresh with experience with LDS Church leadership in Mexico. By 1950 church membership had increased by almost six times since 1935, with membership numbers larger than Brazil and Uruguay. During his presidency, Brown further developed local organization and recruited ecclesiastical leadership from church members in Argentina. Missionary work was expanded with the addition of new programs and proselyting areas. Brown was replaced by Lee Valentine, who continued to send missionaries into new areas in Argentina. Valentine guided LDS Church President David O. McKay on a tour of the Argentine Mission. There, McKay met with president of Argentina at the time Juan Perón. In 1956, Loren N. Pace replaced Valentine as mission president. By 1959, church membership had increased to 3,500. The North Argentine Mission was established in 1962. Even though the Book of Mormon had already been translated into Spanish, there was a lack of church materials in Spanish in South American countries. The church divided up the translation work among Spanish-speaking countries in South America. Argentina was responsible for translating Primary lessons for children into Spanish.

The first stake in Argentina was opened in 1966 in Buenos Aires. This was the first Spanish-speaking stake in South America and the second Spanish speaking stake in the world. Ángel Abrea was named as stake president. In 1981, Abrea become the first general authority from Latin America.

Argentina hosted area conferences in March 1975 and October 1978. These conferences were attended by many general authorities, including church president Spencer W. Kimball. At the end of 1980, there were over 20 stakes, 5 missions, and nearly 50,000 members. In October 1985, a missionary training center (MTC) was built in Buenos Aires. The Buenos Aires Argentina Temple was dedicated on January 17, 1986, becoming the first temple in Argentina. In 1998, there were 265,000 members and 62 stakes in Argentina. By 2009, there were 70 stakes and 10 missions.

The MTC in Argentina closed in July 2019.

== Cultural obstacles ==
There are two main obstacles to LDS missionary work in Argentina. First, traditions in Argentina are deeply rooted parts of their culture. Argentina is majority Roman Catholic, at 60-90% of the population depending on the source, and traditions discourage family members from converting to another religion because it requires someone to sacrifice their normal lives and traditions. Another obstacle to missionary work in Argentina is poverty. Poverty in Argentina is widespread and missionaries discover challenges in trying to proselyte to or convert families who lack food or basic human needs. Recent economic improvements in Argentina have improved the lives of Argentines and improved missionaries' abilities to perform missionary work.

== Stakes and Districts ==
Stake/District	Organized	Mission	Temple
Apostoles Argentina District	11 Feb 1991	Argentina Resistencia	Asunción Paraguay
Bahía Blanca Argentina Stake	23 Jan 1980	Argentina Bahía Blanca	Bahía Blanca Argentina
Bahía Blanca Argentina Villa Mitre Stake	5 Nov 1995	Argentina Bahía Blanca	Bahía Blanca Argentina
Bariloche Argentina Stake	25 Feb 1996	Argentina Neuquén	Bahía Blanca Argentina
Bell Ville Argentina Stake	23 May 1993	Argentina Córdoba	Córdoba Argentina
Buenos Aires Argentina Adrogué Stake	3 Nov 1996	Argentina Buenos Aires South	Buenos Aires Argentina
Buenos Aires Argentina Aldo Bonzi Stake	12 May 1991	Argentina Buenos Aires South	Buenos Aires Argentina
Buenos Aires Argentina Avellaneda Stake	22 Sep 1996	Argentina Buenos Aires East	Buenos Aires Argentina
Buenos Aires Argentina Banfield Stake	14 May 1978	Argentina Buenos Aires South	Buenos Aires Argentina
Buenos Aires Argentina Belgrano Stake	18 Sep 1994	Argentina Buenos Aires North	Buenos Aires Argentina
Buenos Aires Argentina Caseros Stake	12 May 1974	Argentina Buenos Aires West	Buenos Aires Argentina
Buenos Aires Argentina Castelar Stake	8 Jun 1980	Argentina Buenos Aires West	Buenos Aires Argentina
Buenos Aires Argentina Chacabuco Stake	1 Jun 2014	Argentina Buenos Aires North	Buenos Aires Argentina
Buenos Aires Argentina Congreso Stake	6 Dec 1998	Argentina Buenos Aires North	Buenos Aires Argentina
Buenos Aires Argentina Escobar Stake	15 Dec 1996	Argentina Buenos Aires North	Buenos Aires Argentina
Buenos Aires Argentina González Catán Stake	2 Jun 1996	Argentina Buenos Aires South	Buenos Aires Argentina
Buenos Aires Argentina Liniers Stake	20 Nov 1966	Argentina Buenos Aires North	Buenos Aires Argentina
Buenos Aires Argentina Litoral Stake	12 Sep 1980	Argentina Buenos Aires North	Buenos Aires Argentina
Buenos Aires Argentina Longchamps Stake	1 Dec 2002	Argentina Buenos Aires South	Buenos Aires Argentina
Buenos Aires Argentina Marcos Paz Stake	24 Nov 1996	Argentina Buenos Aires West	Buenos Aires Argentina
Buenos Aires Argentina Merlo Stake	13 Aug 1978	Argentina Buenos Aires West	Buenos Aires Argentina
Buenos Aires Argentina Monte Grande Stake	10 Nov 1991	Argentina Buenos Aires South	Buenos Aires Argentina
Buenos Aires Argentina Moreno Stake	20 Mar 1983	Argentina Buenos Aires West	Buenos Aires Argentina
Buenos Aires Argentina North Stake	28 Jan 1979	Argentina Buenos Aires North	Buenos Aires Argentina
Buenos Aires Argentina Pilar Stake	14 Apr 2024	Argentina Buenos Aires North	Buenos Aires Argentina
Buenos Aires Argentina Ramos Mejía Stake	21 Aug 2011	Argentina Buenos Aires West	Buenos Aires Argentina
Buenos Aires Argentina Sarmiento Stake	27 Jun 1993	Argentina Buenos Aires North	Buenos Aires Argentina
Caleta Olivia Argentina District	28 Nov 2004	Argentina Comodoro Rivadavia	Bahía Blanca Argentina
Chivilcoy Argentina District	22 Oct 1981	Argentina Buenos Aires West	Buenos Aires Argentina
Comodoro Rivadavia Argentina Stake	20 Feb 1994	Argentina Comodoro Rivadavia	Bahía Blanca Argentina
Concepción Argentina District	13 Feb 1990	Argentina Tucumán	Salta Argentina
Concordia Argentina District	20 May 1990	Argentina Santa Fe	Buenos Aires Argentina
Córdoba Argentina Chacabuco Stake	2 Sep 2018	Argentina Córdoba	Córdoba Argentina
Córdoba Argentina East Stake	21 Nov 2004	Argentina Córdoba	Córdoba Argentina
Córdoba Argentina Patricios Stake	29 Apr 1979	Argentina Córdoba	Córdoba Argentina
Córdoba Argentina Sierras Stake	7 Nov 1993	Argentina Córdoba	Córdoba Argentina
Córdoba Argentina South Stake	28 Feb 1972	Argentina Córdoba	Córdoba Argentina
Córdoba Argentina West Stake	8 Sep 1996	Argentina Córdoba	Córdoba Argentina
Corrientes Argentina Stake	19 Feb 1991	Argentina Resistencia	Asunción Paraguay
Eldorado Argentina District	20 Mar 1990	Argentina Resistencia	Asunción Paraguay
Esquel Argentina District	23 Jan 2005	Argentina Neuquén	Bahía Blanca Argentina
Florencio Varela Argentina Stake	22 Aug 1993	Argentina Buenos Aires East	Buenos Aires Argentina
Formosa Argentina Stake	6 Jun 2004	Argentina Resistencia	Asunción Paraguay
General Roca Argentina Stake	4 Jun 1995	Argentina Neuquén	Bahía Blanca Argentina
Godoy Cruz Argentina Stake	6 Jun 1979	Argentina Mendoza	Mendoza Argentina
Guaymallén Argentina Stake	17 Apr 1994	Argentina Mendoza	Mendoza Argentina
Ibarreta Argentina District	20 May 1990	Argentina Resistencia	Asunción Paraguay
Jujuy Argentina Stake	7 Jun 1987	Argentina Salta	Salta Argentina
La Costa Argentina District	20 Jun 2004	Argentina Buenos Aires East	Buenos Aires Argentina
La Paz Argentina District	16 Dec 2001	Argentina Santa Fe	Buenos Aires Argentina
La Plata Argentina East Stake	1 Dec 1996	Argentina Buenos Aires East	Buenos Aires Argentina
La Plata Argentina South Stake	2 Dec 2012	Argentina Buenos Aires East	Buenos Aires Argentina
La Plata Argentina Stake	23 Nov 1980	Argentina Buenos Aires East	Buenos Aires Argentina
La Rioja Argentina Stake	17 Oct 2004	Argentina Tucumán	Córdoba Argentina
Lujan Argentina Stake	13 Dec 1992	Argentina Buenos Aires West	Buenos Aires Argentina
Maipú de Cuyo Argentina Stake	4 Jun 1995	Argentina Mendoza	Mendoza Argentina
Mar del Plata Argentina North Stake	21 May 1995	Argentina Bahía Blanca	Buenos Aires Argentina
Mar del Plata Argentina Stake	31 Jan 1979	Argentina Bahía Blanca	Buenos Aires Argentina
Mendoza Argentina Stake	1 Mar 1972	Argentina Mendoza	Mendoza Argentina
Metan Argentina District	8 Aug 1993	Argentina Salta	Salta Argentina
Necochea Argentina District	20 Sep 1988	Argentina Bahía Blanca	Bahía Blanca Argentina
Neuquén Argentina Stake	20 Dec 1992	Argentina Neuquén	Bahía Blanca Argentina
Neuquén Argentina West Stake	7 Jul 1996	Argentina Neuquén	Bahía Blanca Argentina
Olavarría Argentina Stake	21 Jun 2015	Argentina Bahía Blanca	Bahía Blanca Argentina
Paraná Argentina Stake	16 Dec 2002	Argentina Santa Fe	Buenos Aires Argentina
Paso de los Libres Argentina District	11 Jul 1989	Argentina Resistencia	Buenos Aires Argentina
Pergamino Argentina Stake	10 May 1998	Argentina Rosario	Buenos Aires Argentina
Posadas Argentina Stake	20 Sep 1992	Argentina Resistencia	Asunción Paraguay
Punilla Argentina District	27 Sep 2015	Argentina Córdoba	Córdoba Argentina
Quilmes Argentina Stake	15 May 1975	Argentina Buenos Aires East	Buenos Aires Argentina
Rafaela Argentina District	9 Apr 2006	Argentina Santa Fe	Buenos Aires Argentina
Reconquista Argentina District	15 Jul 2018	Argentina Santa Fe	Buenos Aires Argentina
Resistencia Argentina South Stake	17 Nov 1996	Argentina Resistencia	Asunción Paraguay
Resistencia Argentina Stake	15 Feb 1981	Argentina Resistencia	Asunción Paraguay
Río Cuarto Argentina Stake	11 Feb 1996	Argentina Córdoba	Córdoba Argentina
Río Gallegos Argentina District	10 May 1988	Argentina Comodoro Rivadavia	Buenos Aires Argentina
Roque Sáenz Peña Argentina District	6 Mar 1990	Argentina Resistencia	Salta Argentina
Rosario Argentina North Stake	10 Sep 1980	Argentina Rosario	Buenos Aires Argentina
Rosario Argentina Stake	5 May 1974	Argentina Rosario	Buenos Aires Argentina
Rosario Argentina West Stake	28 May 1995	Argentina Rosario	Buenos Aires Argentina
Salta Argentina Stake	29 Apr 1981	Argentina Salta	Salta Argentina
Salta Argentina West Stake	15 Oct 1995	Argentina Salta	Salta Argentina
San Juan Argentina Chimbas Stake	18 Feb 1996	Argentina Mendoza	Mendoza Argentina
San Juan Argentina Nuevo Cuyo Stake	24 May 1992	Argentina Mendoza	Mendoza Argentina
San Luis Argentina Stake	14 Dec 2003	Argentina Mendoza	Mendoza Argentina
San Martin Argentina District	28 Sep 2014	Argentina Mendoza	Mendoza Argentina
San Nicolás Argentina Stake	22 Feb 1979	Argentina Rosario	Buenos Aires Argentina
San Pedro Argentina Jujuy District	3 Apr 1989	Argentina Salta	Salta Argentina
San Rafael Argentina Stake	19 Feb 1995	Argentina Mendoza	Mendoza Argentina
Santa Fe Argentina North Stake	13 Aug 1995	Argentina Santa Fe	Córdoba Argentina
Santa Fe Argentina Stake	20 Jul 1980	Argentina Santa Fe	Córdoba Argentina
Santa Rosa Argentina Stake	20 Oct 1996	Argentina Bahía Blanca	Bahía Blanca Argentina
Santiago del Estero Argentina Stake	20 Jun 1993	Argentina Tucumán	Salta Argentina
Tartagal Argentina Stake	19 Apr 2026	Argentina Salta	Salta Argentina
Tierra del Fuego Argentina Stake	2 Jun 2019	Argentina Comodoro Rivadavia	Buenos Aires Argentina
Trelew Argentina North Stake	11 Jun 1989	Argentina Comodoro Rivadavia	Bahía Blanca Argentina
Trelew Argentina South Stake	8 Dec 1996	Argentina Comodoro Rivadavia	Bahía Blanca Argentina
Tucumán Argentina Stake	21 Jan 1980	Argentina Tucumán	Salta Argentina
Tucumán Argentina West Stake	18 Dec 1994	Argentina Tucumán	Salta Argentina
Valle de Uco Argentina District	17 Jun 1990	Argentina Mendoza	Mendoza Argentina
Venado Tuerto Argentina District	24 Feb 1989	Argentina Rosario	Buenos Aires Argentina
Viedma Argentina District	4 Mar 1990	Argentina Bahía Blanca	Bahía Blanca Argentina
Zapala Argentina Stake	30 Jun 1996	Argentina Neuquén	Bahía Blanca Argentina
Zárate Argentina Stake	27 Jul 1997	Argentina Buenos Aires North	Buenos Aires Argentina

== Missions ==
Mission	Organized
Argentina Bahía Blanca	1 Jul 1980
Argentina Buenos Aires East	1 Jul 2015
Argentina Buenos Aires North	25 May 1935
Argentina Buenos Aires South	1 Jul 1974
Argentina Buenos Aires West	20 Jan 1992
Argentina Comodoro Rivadavia	1 Jul 2013
Argentina Córdoba	16 Sep 1962
Argentina Mendoza	1 Jul 1990
Argentina Neuquén	1 Jul 1990
Argentina Resistencia	1 Jul 1990
Argentina Rosario	1 Jul 1972
Argentina Salta	19 Oct 1987
Argentina Santa Fe	1 Jul 2015

== Temples ==

Temples in and near Argentina
= Operating
= Under construction
= Announced
= Temporarily Closed

39. Buenos Aires Argentina Temple; Official website; News & images	
Location: Announced: Groundbreaking: Dedicated: Rededicated: Size: Style:	Ciudad Evita, Argentina; 2 April 1980 by Spencer W. Kimball; 20 April 1983 by Bruce R. McConkie; 17 January 1986 by Thomas S. Monson; 9 September 2012 by Henry B. Eyring; 30,659 sq ft (2,848.3 m^{2}) on a 3.73-acre (1.51 ha) site Modern adaptation of six-spire design - designed by Ramon Paez and Church A&E Services
145. Córdoba Argentina Temple; Official website; News & images	
Location: Announced: Groundbreaking: Dedicated: Size: Notes:	Córdoba, Argentina; 4 October 2008 by Thomas S. Monson; 30 October 2010 by Neil L. Andersen; 17 May 2015 by Dieter F. Uchtdorf; 34,369 sq ft (3,193.0 m^{2}) on a 5.18-acre (2.10 ha) site A public open house was held from 17 April-2 May 2015, excluding Sundays, and the temple was dedicated in three sessions on 17 May 2015.
194. Salta Argentina Temple; Official website; News & images	
Location: Announced: Groundbreaking: Dedicated: Size:	Salta, Argentina; 1 April 2018 by Russell M. Nelson; 4 November 2020 by Benjamin De Hoyos; 16 June 2024 by D. Todd Christofferson; 27,000 sq ft (2,500 m^{2}) on a 17.72-acre (7.17 ha) site
197. Mendoza Argentina Temple; Official website; News & images	
Location: Announced: Groundbreaking: Dedicated: Size:	Mendoza, Argentina; 7 October 2018 by Russell M. Nelson; 17 December 2020 by Allen D. Haynie; 22 September 2024 by Ronald A. Rasband; 21,999 sq ft (2,043.8 m^{2}) on a 15-acre (6.1 ha) site
211. Bahía Blanca Argentina Temple; Official website; News & images	
Location: Announced: Groundbreaking: Dedicated: Size:	Bahía Blanca, Argentina; 5 April 2020 by Russell M. Nelson; 9 April 2022 by Joaquin E. Costa; 23 November 2025 by Ulisses Soares; 23,400 sq ft (2,170 m^{2}) on a 8-acre (3.2 ha) site
311. Buenos Aires City Center Argentina Temple (Site announced); Official website; News & images	
Location: Announced:	Buenos Aires, Argentina; 2 October 2022 by Russell M. Nelson on a 1.56-acre (0.63 ha) site
342. Rosario Argentina Temple (Site announced); Official website; News & images	
Location: Announced:	Rosario, Argentina; 7 April 2024 by Russell M. Nelson on a 1.59-acre (0.64 ha) site

== See also ==
- Roman Catholicism in Argentina
- Religion in Argentina
- Freedom of religion in Argentina
