= The Church of Jesus Christ of Latter-day Saints in Colorado =

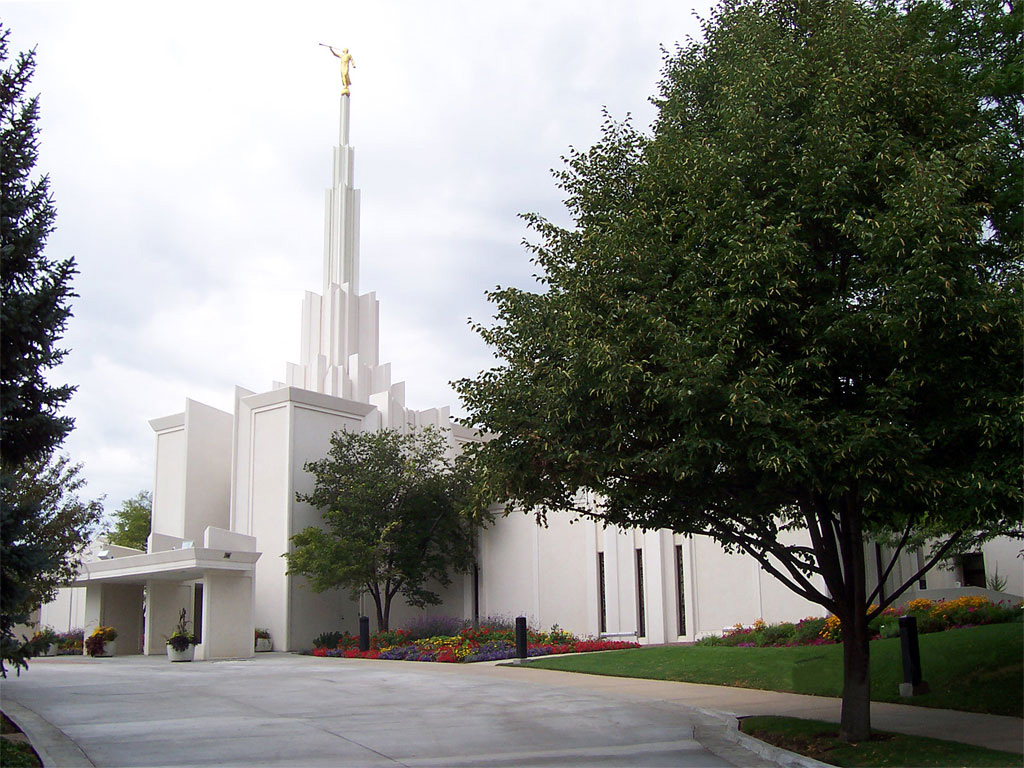
- The Denver Colorado Temple
- Area: US Central
- Members: 148,945 (2025)
- Stakes: 36
- Wards: 279
- Branches: 36
- Total Congregations: 315
- Missions: 4
- Temples: 3 operating 1 announced 4 total
- FamilySearch Centers: 64

The Church of Jesus Christ of Latter-day Saints in Colorado refers to the Church of Jesus Christ of Latter-day Saints (LDS Church) and its members in Colorado. The first congregation of the Church in Colorado was organized in 1897. It has since grown to 148,945 members in 315 congregations.

Official church membership as a percentage of general population was 2.82% in 2014. According to the 2014 Pew Forum on Religion & Public Life survey 2% of Coloradans self-identify themselves most closely with The Church of Jesus Christ of Latter-day Saints. The LDS Church is the 2nd largest denomination in Colorado behind the Roman Catholic Church. Colorado has the 10th most members of the LDS Church in the United States.

== History ==
Membership in Colorado
Year	Members
1920	4,376
1930	6,435
1940	7,882
1950	10,728
1960	19,587
1970	35,613
1980	51,857
1990	88,625
1999	112,232
2009	137,145
2019	150,509
2025	148,945
Source: Windall J. Ashton; Jim M. Wall, Deseret News, various years, Church Almanac State Information: Colorado

On August 7, 1846, a settlement of 61 recent converts of the church traveling from Mississippi made camp on the Arkansas River, just east of present-day Pueblo in the southern part of the state. They had come along the main Overland trail to Fort Laramie but discovered the first groups of Mormon Pioneers from Nauvoo had stopped for the winter at Council Bluffs. Rather than turn back to join them; a trapper named John Renshaw led them down to a small adobe trading fort called El Pueblo which was thought to be a more suitable place to spend the winter. They made their camp about a half-mile south of El Pueblo.

While encamped in Pueblo the settlement was also joined by 3 different groups of the Mormon Battalion arriving between September 1846 and January 27, 1847. With the arrival in January, the population of the colony reached 289 people. This temporary colony was the first branch of The Church of Jesus Christ of Latter-day Saints in Colorado. The settlement is also widely believed to be the first Anglo settlement in what is now the state of Colorado. The settlement also was the home of the first Anglo born child in Colorado; Sarah Emma Kartchner.

In April 1847, the first members of the settlement began their trek north to Fort Laramie where they were waiting when Brigham Young arrives in June 1847. By the fall of 1848, all the members of the church had left the Pueblo settlement.

The first mission was established in the area in 1896 and the first congregation of the LDS Church in Colorado was organized in January 1897.

The Denver Colorado Temple in Centennial was completed in 1986.

The Fort Collins Colorado Temple was formally dedicated by Dieter F. Uchtdorf on October 16, 2016.

== County Statistics ==
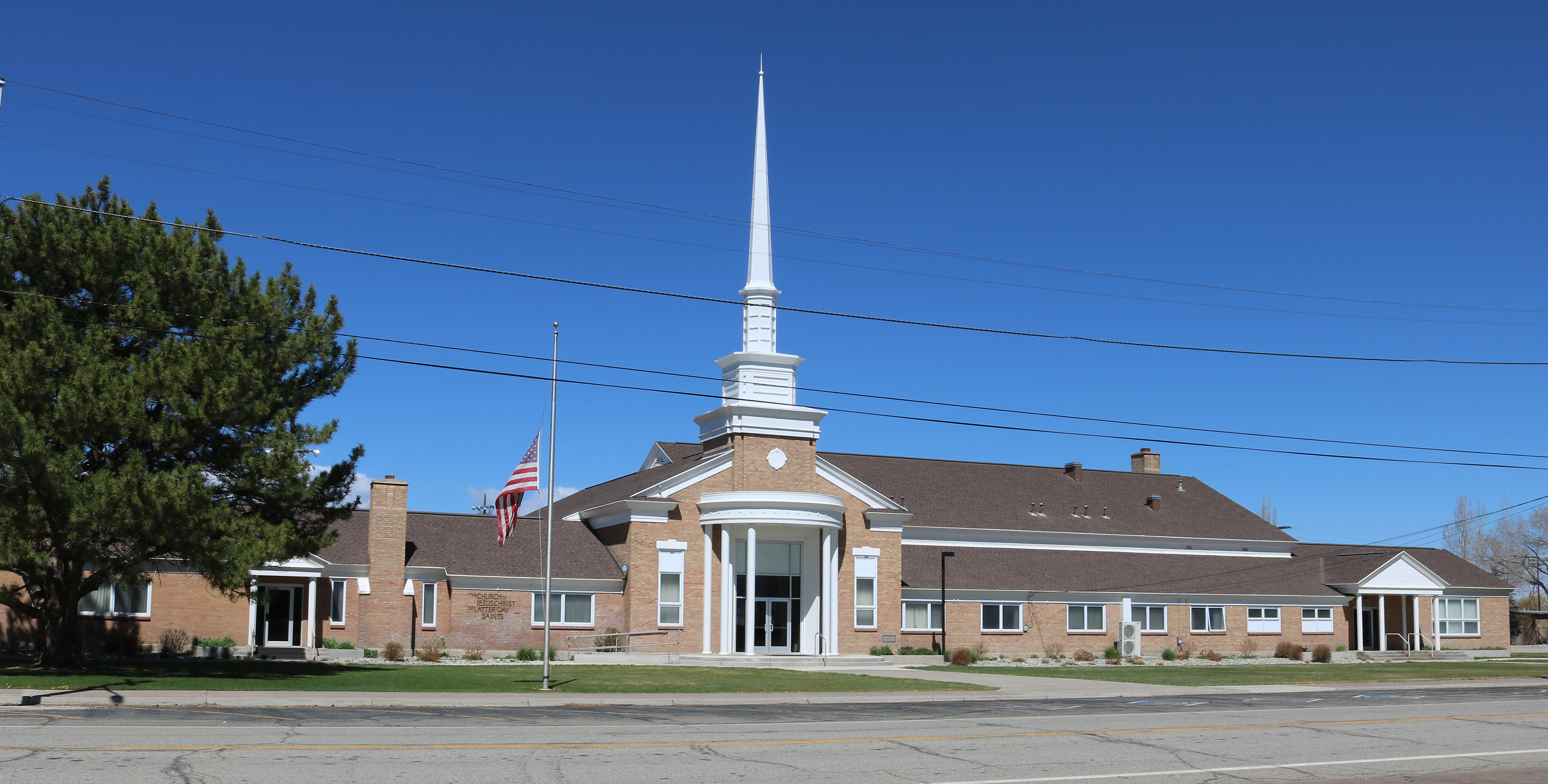
Meetinghouse in Sanford, Colorado

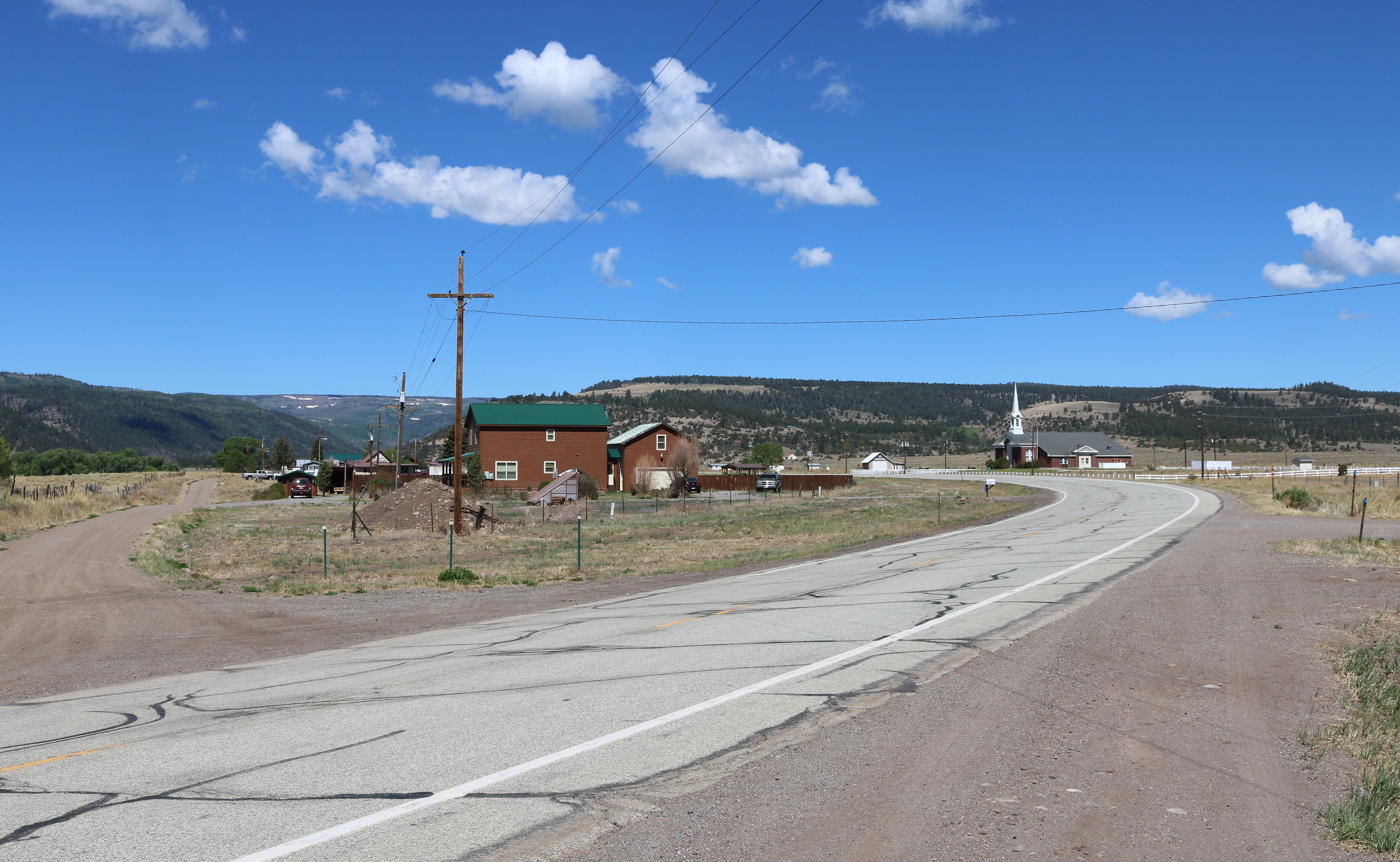
A branch meetinghouse in Fox Creek, Colorado, an unincorporated community in Conejos County.

List of LDS Church adherents in each county as of 2010 according to the Association of Religion Data Archives: Note: Each county adherent count reflects meetinghouse location of congregation and not by location of residence. Census count reflects location of residence which may skew percent of population where adherents reside in a different county as their congregational meetinghouse.

County	Congregations	Adherents	% of Population
Adams	18	11,400	2.58
Alamosa	5	1,547	10.02
Arapahoe	27	14,505	2.54
Baca	0		
Bent	0		
Boulder	17	8,620	2.93
Chaffee	2	435	2.44
Cheyenne	0		
Clear Creek	1	232	2.55
Conejos	8	2,343	28.38
Costilla	1	161	4.57
Crowley	0		
Custer	1	117	2.75
Delta	3	1,535	4.96
Denver	13	10,092	1.68
Dolores	0		
Douglas	28	13,111	4.59
Eagle	2	818	1.57
El Paso	1	18,602	2.99
Elbert	2	738	3.20
Fremont	2	1,434	3.06
Garfield	5	2,085	3.70
Gilpin	0		
Grand	1	253	1.71
Gunnison	2	4,157	27.13
Hinsdale	0		
Huerfano	0		
Jackson	0		
Jefferson	22	11,175	2.09
Kiowa	0		
Kit Carson	1	226	2.73
La Plata	4	2,126	4.14
Lake	0		
Larimer	20	8,622	2.88
Las Animas	0		
Lincoln	1	128	2.34
Logan	1	554	2.44
Mesa	18	10,060	6.86
Mineral	0		
Moffat	3	1,339	9.71
Montezuma	5	2,277	8.92
Montrose	6	2,800	6.78
Morgan	1	128	0.46
Otero	1	582	3.09
Ouray	0		
Park	0		
Phillips	0		
Pitkin	1	268	1.56
Prowers	2	439	3.50
Pueblo	8	4,287	2.70
Rio Blanco	3	1,055	15.83
Rio Grande	2	579	4.83
Routt	1	356	1.51
Saguache	1	196	3.21
San Juan	1	35	5.01
San Miguel	0		
Sedgwick	0		
Summit	1	557	1.99
Teller	1	713	3.05
Washington	0		
Weld	11	4,811	1.90
Yuma	1	128	1.28

== Stakes ==
Stake	Organized	Mission	Temple District
Alamosa Colorado	29 May 1983	Colorado Colorado Springs	Albuquerque New Mexico
Arapahoe Colorado	27 Sep 1987	Colorado Denver East	Denver Colorado
Arvada Colorado	21 Jun 1959	Colorado Fort Collins	Denver Colorado
Aurora Colorado	6 Dec 1981	Colorado Denver East	Denver Colorado
Aurora Colorado South	22 Sep 2013	Colorado Denver East	Denver Colorado
Boulder Colorado	28 Jan 1973	Colorado Fort Collins	Fort Collins Colorado
Brighton Colorado	10 Nov 2013	Colorado Denver East	Fort Collins Colorado
Castle Rock Colorado	7 Mar 2004	Colorado Denver East	Denver Colorado
Colorado Springs Colorado	11 Sep 1960	Colorado Colorado Springs	Denver Colorado
Colorado Springs East	26 Aug 1990	Colorado Colorado Springs	Denver Colorado
Colorado Springs High Plains	11 Dec 2016	Colorado Colorado Springs	Denver Colorado
Colorado Springs North	18 May 1980	Colorado Colorado Springs	Denver Colorado
Columbine Colorado	7 Dec 1980	Colorado Denver West	Denver Colorado
Craig Colorado	15 Oct 2017	Colorado Denver West	Vernal Utah
Denver Colorado	30 Jun 1940	Colorado Denver East	Denver Colorado
Denver Colorado North	28 Jan 1973	Colorado Denver East	Fort Collins Colorado
Durango Colorado	7 Nov 1971	New Mexico Farmington	Farmington New Mexico
Fort Collins Colorado	1 Dec 1968	Colorado Fort Collins	Fort Collins Colorado
Fountain Colorado	12 Dec 1999	Colorado Colorado Springs	Denver Colorado
Front Range Colorado	19 Apr 1964	Colorado Denver West	Denver Colorado
Fruita Colorado	8 Jun 2025	Colorado Denver West	Grand Junction Colorado
Garden City Kansas Stake (Note: Stake located outside Colorado with congregation(s) meeting in Colorado)	18 May 2003	Kansas Wichita	Denver Colorado
Grand Junction Colorado	16 Oct 1955	Colorado Denver West	Grand Junction Colorado
Grand Junction Colorado West	24 Apr 1983	Colorado Denver West	Grand Junction Colorado
Greeley Colorado	28 Apr 1985	Colorado Fort Collins	Fort Collins Colorado
Highlands Ranch Colorado	19 May 1985	Colorado Denver West	Denver Colorado
Littleton Colorado	2 Sep 1973	Colorado Denver West	Denver Colorado
Longmont Colorado	11 Nov 1990	Colorado Fort Collins	Fort Collins Colorado
Loveland Colorado	18 Jun 2000	Colorado Fort Collins	Fort Collins Colorado
Manassa Colorado	10 Jun 1883	Colorado Colorado Springs	Albuquerque New Mexico
Montrose Colorado	5 Nov 1978	Colorado Denver West	Grand Junction Colorado
Parker Colorado South	13 Mar 2011	Colorado Denver East	Denver Colorado
Parker Colorado	15 Sep 1996	Colorado Denver East	Denver Colorado
Pueblo Colorado	3 Mar 1974	Colorado Colorado Springs	Denver Colorado
Rifle Colorado	15 Jan 1961	Colorado Denver West	Grand Junction Colorado
Westminster Colorado	27 Apr 1997	Colorado Fort Collins	Fort Collins Colorado
Windsor Colorado	23 Aug 2015	Colorado Fort Collins	Fort Collins Colorado

== Missions ==
The Colorado Mission was opened on December 15, 1896, with John W. Taylor as president. This mission was renamed the Western States Mission on April 1, 1907, then the Colorado-New Mexico Mission on June 10, 1970, then the Colorado Mission on October 10, 1972, and the Colorado Denver Mission on June 20, 1974. It was finally renamed the Colorado Denver South Mission on July 1, 1993, upon creation of the Colorado Denver North Mission.

Colorado now contains four missions.

Mission	Organized
Colorado Colorado Springs Mission	July 1, 2002
Colorado Denver South Mission	December 15, 1896
Colorado Denver North Mission	July 1, 1993
Colorado Fort Collins Mission	July 1, 2013

The southwestern portion of the state is located in the New Mexico Farmington Mission.

== Temples ==
Temples in Colorado
- = Operating
- = Under construction
- = Announced
- = Temporarily Closed

On October 24, 1986, the Denver Colorado Temple was dedicated by President Ezra Taft Benson. On April 2, 2011, the Fort Collins Colorado Temple was announced. Western portions of Colorado are in the Vernal Utah Temple and Monticello Utah Temple districts. Stakes within the San Luis Valley are in the Albuquerque New Mexico Temple district. The Durango Colorado Stake is in the Farmington New Mexico Temple district.

40. Denver Colorado Temple; Official website; News & images	
Location: Announced: Groundbreaking: Dedicated: Size: Style:	Centennial, Colorado, United States; March 31, 1982 by Spencer W. Kimball; May 19, 1984 by Gordon B. Hinckley; October 24, 1986 by Ezra Taft Benson; 29,177 sq ft (2,710.6 m^{2}) on a 7.5-acre (3.0 ha) site Modern, single-spire design - designed by Church A&E Services and Bobby R. Thomas
153. Fort Collins Colorado Temple; Official website; News & images	
Location: Announced: Groundbreaking: Dedicated: Size:	Fort Collins, Colorado, United States; April 2, 2011 by Thomas S. Monson; August 24, 2013 by Ronald A. Rasband; October 16, 2016 by Dieter F. Uchtdorf; 42,000 sq ft (3,900 m^{2}) on a 15.69-acre (6.35 ha) site
210. Grand Junction Colorado Temple; Official website; News & images	
Location: Announced: Groundbreaking: Dedicated: Size:	Grand Junction, Colorado, United States; 4 April 2021 by Russell M. Nelson; 16 April 2022 by Chi Hong (Sam) Wong; 19 October 2025 by Jeffrey R. Holland; 29,630 sq ft (2,753 m^{2}) on a 7.93-acre (3.21 ha) site
287. Colorado Springs Colorado Temple (Under construction); Official website; News & images	
Location: Announced: Groundbreaking: Size:	Colorado Springs, Colorado; 1 October 2023 by Russell M. Nelson; 12 September 2026 by Karl D. Hirst; 45,000 sq ft (4,200 m^{2}) on a 18.6-acre (7.5 ha) site

== Communities ==
Latter-day Saints have had a significant role in establishing and settling communities within the "Mormon Corridor", including the following located in Colorado:

- La Jara
- Manassa
- Sanford

== See also ==
- The Church of Jesus Christ of Latter-day Saints membership statistics (United States)
- Conejos County, Colorado: Religious history
- Pueblo, Colorado, where the sick detachments of the Mormon Battalion wintered in 1846-1847
