= Córdoba Argentina Temple =

Temple of the Church of Jesus Christ of Latter-day Saints in Argentina

- Interactive map of Córdoba Argentina Temple
- Number: 145
- Dedication: 17 May 2015, by Dieter F. Uchtdorf
- Site: 5.18 acres (2.10 ha)
- Floor area: 34,369 ft^{2} (3,193.0 m^{2})
- Official website • News & images

Church chronology
← Phoenix Arizona Temple	Córdoba Argentina Temple	→ Payson Utah Temple

Additional information
- Announced: 4 October 2008, by Thomas S. Monson
- Groundbreaking: 30 October 2010, by Neil L. Andersen
- Open house: 17 April-2 May 2015
- Current president: Jorge E. Detlefsen
- Location: Córdoba, Argentina
- Coordinates: 31°21′31″S 64°14′44″W
- Exterior finish: Light grey granite quarried in Córdoba and milled in Buenos Aires, Argentina
- Baptistries: 1
- Ordinance rooms: 2 (two-stage progressive)
- Sealing rooms: 2
- Notes: A public open house was held from 17 April-2 May 2015, excluding Sundays, and the temple was dedicated in three sessions on 17 May 2015.

The Córdoba Argentina Temple is a temple of the Church of Jesus Christ of Latter-day Saints in the Villa Belgrano neighborhood of Cordoba, Argentina. The intent to build the temple was announced on October 4, 2008, by church president Thomas S. Monson during general conference.

The temple has a single attached central spire with an angel Moroni statue on top. The building was designed with light grey granite quarried in Córdoba, milled in Buenos Aires, and includes architectural influences that blend traditional Latter-day Saint temple design with local materials. A groundbreaking ceremony, to signify the beginning of construction, was held on October 30, 2010, conducted by Neil L. Andersen.

== History ==
The temple was announced by church president Thomas S. Monson on October 4, 2008 during general conference. The site for the temple was selected adjacent to a church meetinghouse in Villa Belgrano, in the northwestern quarter of Córdoba, on a 5.18-acre property that was previously a sports complex, includes the Argentina Córdoba Mission home.

A groundbreaking ceremony took place on October 30, 2010, presided over by Neil L. Andersen of the Quorum of the Twelve Apostles, who was accompanied by general authorities Walter F. Gonzalez, Mervyn B. Arnold, and Marcos A. Aidukaitis. The ceremony was attended by local church leaders and members, along with government officials. A gold-leafed statue of the angel Moroni was installed on the spire on August 13, 2014. After construction was completed, a public open house was held from April 17 to May 2, 2015, excluding Sundays, and which was attended by more than 49,000 people.

The Córdoba Argentina Temple was dedicated on May 17, 2015, in three dedicatory sessions by Dieter F. Uchtdorf, second counselor in the First Presidency. D. Todd Christofferson, of the Quorum of the Twelve Apostles, who had previously served as a missionary in Argentina near the temple site, also participated. The dedication took place on Ascension Day, a Christian holiday commemorating Jesus Christ's ascension into heaven.

The temple serves church members in the northwest half of Argentina, who previously traveled to the Buenos Aires Argentina Temple. Argentina has about 475,000 church members and 725 congregations.

== Design and architecture ==
The Córdoba Argentina Temple is 34,369 square feet (3,193 square meters) and is on a 5.18-acre (2.1-hectare) site. The temple's exterior is finished with light grey granite quarried in Córdoba and milled in Buenos Aires. It has a single central spire with a gold-leafed angel Moroni statue on its top.

The interior includes wood paneling, inlaid wood details, and marble flooring with floral accents. The color scheme has natural hues and detailed painting and gold stenciling. Red marble counters and accent stone from Spain (Rojo Alicante) are used in the building. The rooms have Swarovski crystal chandeliers manufactured by Schonbek Worldwide of New York. Hand-sculpted carpets feature designs mirroring the decorative painting, including custom-made carpets for the bride's room and the entryway.

The temple has two instruction rooms, two sealing rooms, and a baptistry.

== Cultural and community impact ==
The temple district includes the northwest half of Argentina, home to tens of thousands of church members and hundreds of wards and branches. Prior to its dedication, more than 49,000 visitors toured the temple during the public open house.

On May 16, 2015, nearly 1,000 youth from the temple district participated in a cultural celebration held at the Orfeo Superdome in Córdoba. The event featured music and dance honoring Argentina's national legacy and the church's history.

== Temple presidents ==
The church's temples are directed by a temple president and matron, each typically serving for a term of three years. The president and matron oversee the administration of temple operations and provide guidance and training for both temple patrons and staff. Mario C. Cristóbal was the first president, with Vilma M. de Romero serving as matron. As of 2025, Jorge E. Detlefsen is the president, with Adriana M. Salomón Detlefsen serving as matron.

== Admittance ==
After construction was completed, a public open house was held from April 17 through May 2, 2015, excluding Sundays. The temple was dedicated on May 17, 2015, by Dieter F. Uchtdorf.

Like all the church's temples, it is not used for Sunday worship services. To members of the church, temples are regarded as sacred houses of the Lord. Once dedicated, only church members with a current temple recommend can enter for worship.

== See also ==

Temples in and near Argentina
= Operating
= Under construction
= Announced
= Temporarily Closed

- Comparison of temples of The Church of Jesus Christ of Latter-day Saints
- List of temples of The Church of Jesus Christ of Latter-day Saints
- List of temples of The Church of Jesus Christ of Latter-day Saints by geographic region
- Temple architecture (Latter-day Saints)
- The Church of Jesus Christ of Latter-day Saints in Argentina
