= Fort Collins Colorado Temple =

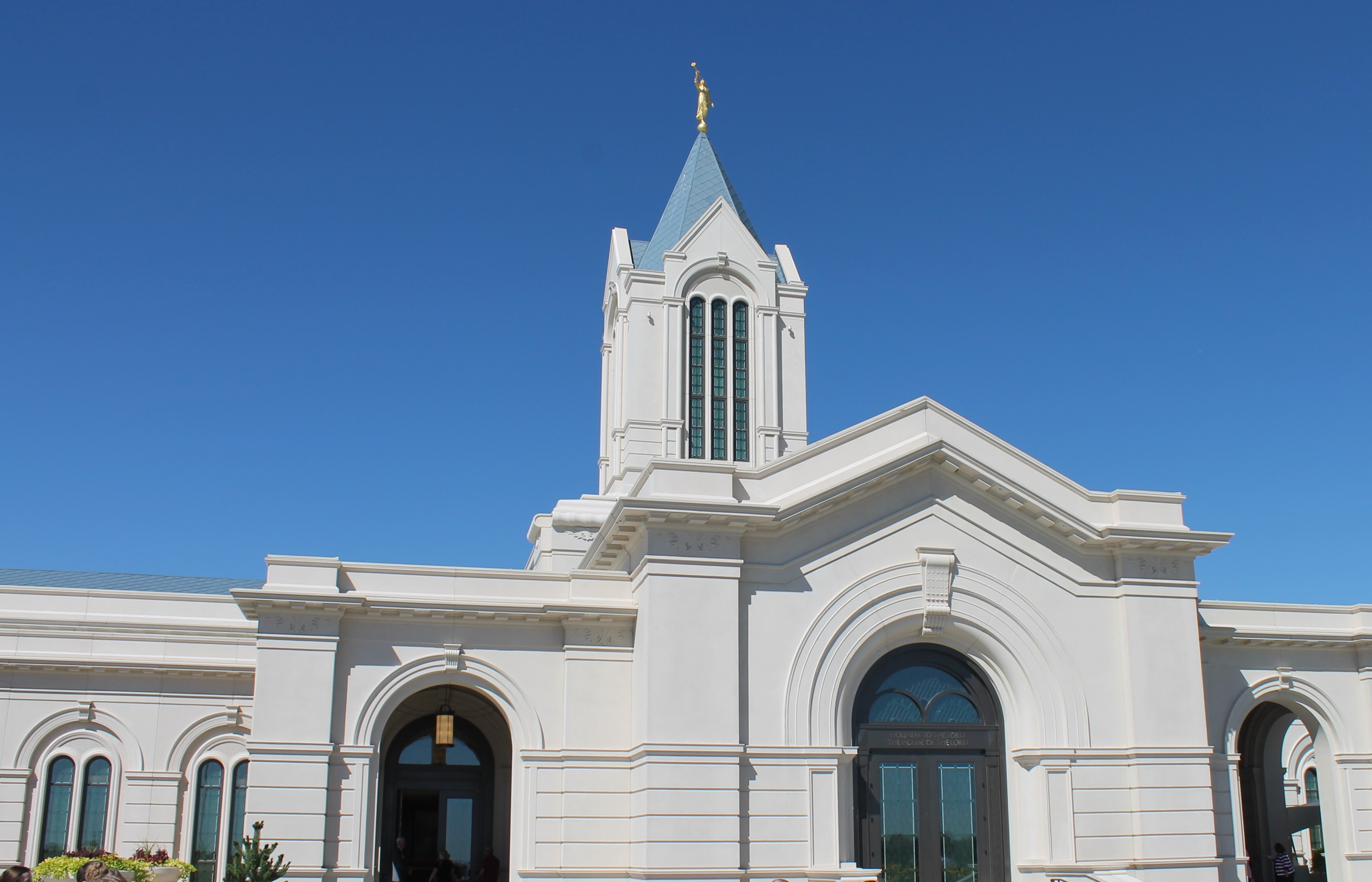
- Fort Collins Colorado Temple in 2016
- Interactive map of Fort Collins Colorado Temple
- Number: 153
- Dedication: October 16, 2016, by Dieter F. Uchtdorf
- Site: 15.69 acres (6.35 ha)
- Floor area: 42,000 ft^{2} (3,900 m^{2})
- Height: 112 ft (34 m)
- Official website • News & images

Church chronology
← Philadelphia Pennsylvania Temple	Fort Collins Colorado Temple	→ Star Valley Wyoming Temple

Additional information
- Announced: April 2, 2011, by Thomas S. Monson
- Groundbreaking: August 24, 2013, by Ronald A. Rasband
- Open house: Friday, August 19, 2016-Saturday, September 10, 2016
- Current president: Alan J. Baker
- Location: Fort Collins, Colorado, United States
- Coordinates: 40.4941°N 105.0378°W
- Baptistries: 1
- Ordinance rooms: 2 (two-stage progressive)
- Sealing rooms: 3

The Fort Collins Colorado Temple is a temple of the Church of Jesus Christ of Latter-day Saints in Fort Collins, Colorado. Completed in 2016, the intent to construct the temple was announced by church president Thomas S. Monson on April 2, 2011, during general conference. The temple is the second in Colorado.

The temple has a single attached central tower with a statue of the angel Moroni. A groundbreaking ceremony, to signify the beginning of construction, was held on August 24, 2013, conducted by Ronald A. Rasband.

== History ==
The temple was announced by Thomas S. Monson on April 2, 2011. The temple is on the southeast corner of the intersection at Trilby Road and Timberline Road, across the street from one of the church's chapels in Fort Collins. The 42,000-square-foot (3,900 m^{2}) structure served the needs of more than 20,000 church members in Northern Colorado, Western Nebraska and Southern Wyoming at the time of its completion.

The developers applied to rezone the land. The property was originally zoned to support only homes and neighborhood centers that, act "as a focal point for neighborhood activity," and may include, "a grocery store or supermarket and other neighborhood oriented retail services." Due to an intergovernmental agreement between the Larimer County and the City of Fort Collins, the developer first pursued the rezoning through Larimer County, followed by an annexation and rezoning process through the City of Fort Collins.

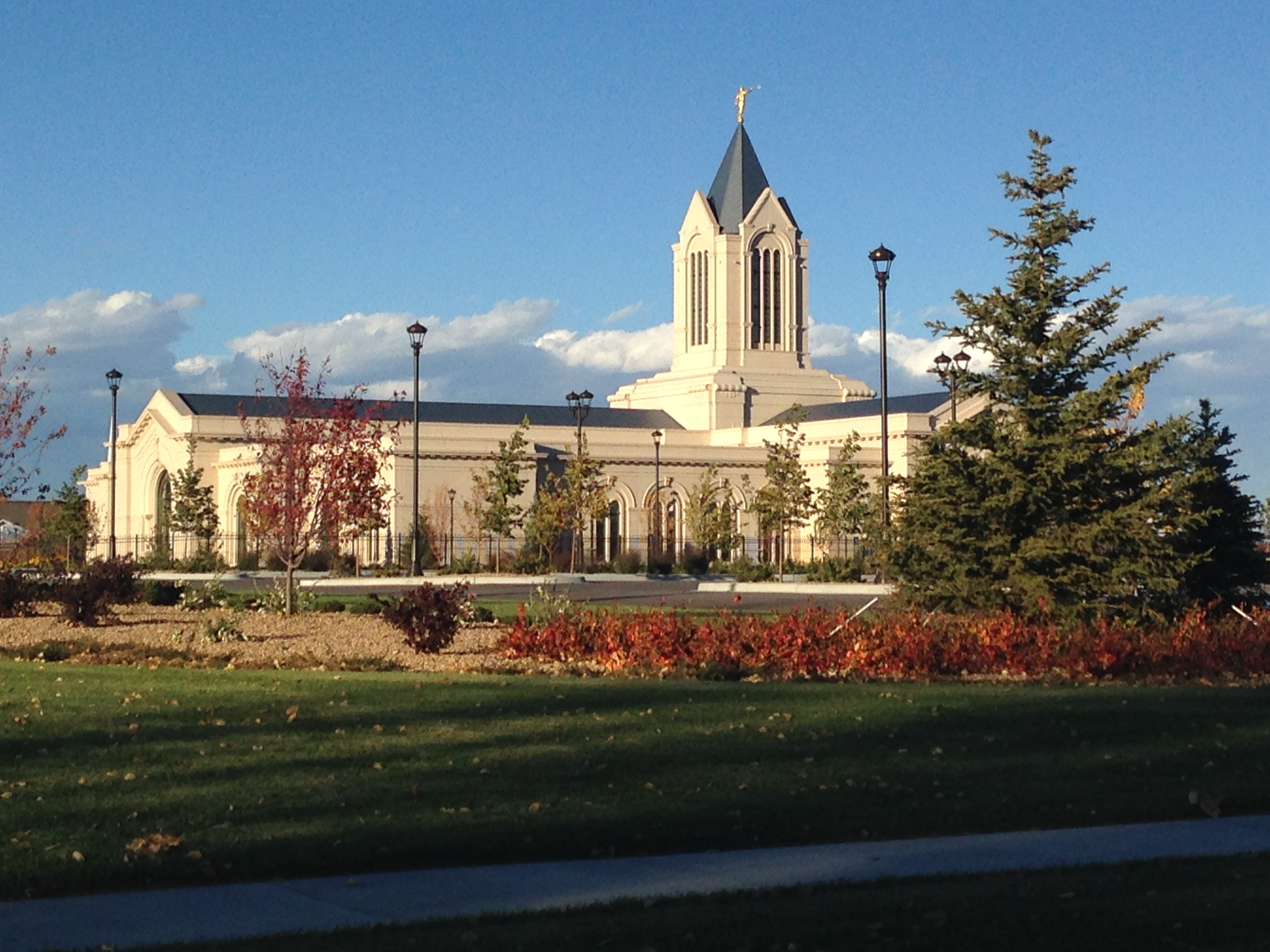

In November 2011, the city planning board in Fort Collins recommended annexation and rezoning of the proposed temple site. Work on the temple commenced with a groundbreaking ceremony conducted by Ronald A. Rasband on August 24, 2013.

As construction progressed, the temple was vandalized on August 23, 2015, along with other places of worship in the local area. On August 26, 2015, a statue of the angel Moroni was put in place.

After construction was completed, a public open house was held from August 19 through September 10, 2016, excluding Sundays. The temple was dedicated by Dieter F. Uchtdorf, of the church's First Presidency on October 16, 2016.

== Design and architecture ==
The building has a traditional Latter-day Saint temple design. Designed by Architectural Nexus and Aaron Arbuckle, its architecture reflects both the cultural heritage of the Fort Collins region and its spiritual significance to the church.

The temple sits on a 12.3-acre plot, and the landscaping around the temple features local trees and a stone fountain. These elements are designed to provide a tranquil setting that enhances the sacred atmosphere of the site.

The structure is 112 feet tall, constructed with precast concrete. The exterior has art glass windows featuring a mountain flora motif inspired by the Rocky Mountains, with a color palette of blues, golds, and greens.

The interior features flooring with Spanish-influenced patterns, decorative painting in the same color palette as the exterior windows, with Spanish and mountain flora motifs, and art glass similar to that of the exterior. The temple also has an original oil painting wall mural which depicts the local landscape.

The temple includes two instruction rooms, three sealing rooms, and one baptistry, each arranged for ceremonial use. Symbolic elements are integrated into the design, providing deeper meaning to the temple's function and aesthetics.

The design uses elements representing the natural landscapes and heritage of Colorado, providing spiritual meaning to the temple's appearance and function. Symbolism is important to church members and includes the mountain flora motif used in the art glass windows, representative of the nearby Rocky Mountains, as well as the Spanish-inspired patterns in the flooring and decorative painting, which are a nod to the region’s history.

== Temple presidents ==
The church's temples are directed by a temple president and matron, each serving for a term of three years. The president and matron oversee the administration of temple operations and provide guidance and training for both temple patrons and staff.

The first president of the Fort Collins Colorado Temple was John S. Garrett, with the matron being Sandra G. Garrett. They served from 2016 to 2016. As of 2024, Wallace L. Stock is the president, with Jan E. Stock serving as matron.

== Admittance ==
Following completion of the temple, a public open house was held from August 19-September 10, 2016 (excluding Sundays). During the open house, over 105,000 people visited the temple. The temple was dedicated by Dieter F. Uchtdorf on October 16, 2016, in three sessions.

Like all the church's temples, it is not used for Sunday worship services. To members of the church, temples are regarded as sacred houses of the Lord. Once dedicated, only church members with a current temple recommend can enter for worship.

== See also ==
Temples in Colorado
- = Operating
- = Under construction
- = Announced
- = Temporarily Closed

- Comparison of temples of The Church of Jesus Christ of Latter-day Saints
- List of temples of The Church of Jesus Christ of Latter-day Saints
- List of temples of The Church of Jesus Christ of Latter-day Saints by geographic region
- Temple architecture (Latter-day Saints)
- The Church of Jesus Christ of Latter-day Saints in Colorado
