= Buenos Aires Argentina Temple =

Mormon Temple

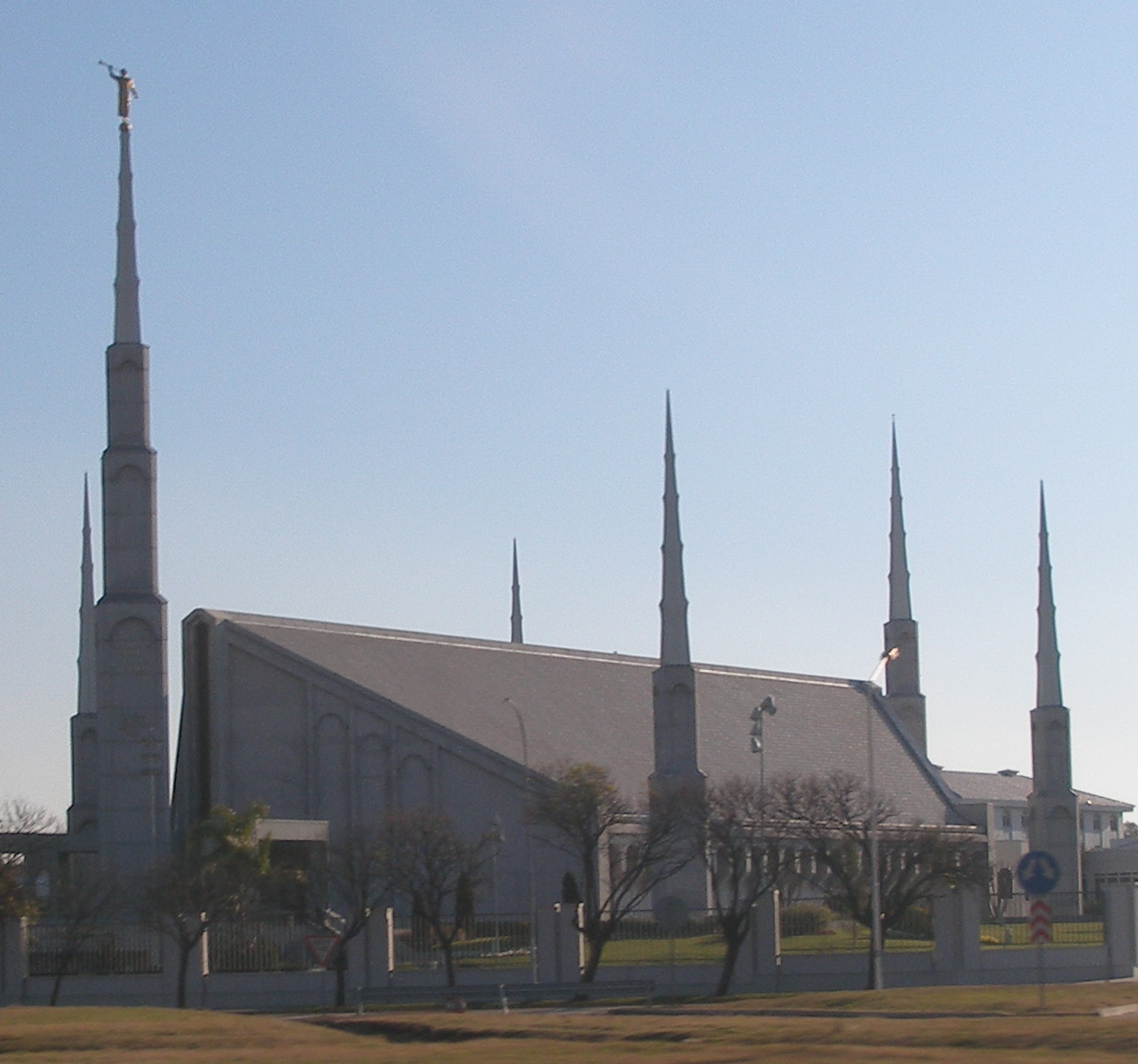
- Interactive map of Buenos Aires Argentina Temple
- Number: 39
- Dedication: 17 January 1986, by Thomas S. Monson
- Site: 3.73 acres (1.51 ha)
- Floor area: 30,659 ft^{2} (2,848.3 m^{2})
- Height: 112 ft (34 m)
- Official website • News & images

Church chronology
← Lima Peru Temple	Buenos Aires Argentina Temple	→ Denver Colorado Temple

Additional information
- Announced: 2 April 1980, by Spencer W. Kimball
- Groundbreaking: 20 April 1983, by Bruce R. McConkie
- Open house: 17–24 December 1985; 4–25 August 2012
- Rededicated: 9 September 2012, by Henry B. Eyring
- Current president: Fernando D. Ortega
- Designed by: Ramon Paez and Church A&E Services
- Location: Ciudad Evita, Argentina
- Coordinates: 34°43′45.42960″S 58°31′5.610000″W
- Exterior finish: Light gray native granite
- Design: Modern adaptation of six-spire design
- Baptistries: 1
- Ordinance rooms: 4 (stationary)
- Sealing rooms: 3
- Clothing rental: Yes

The Buenos Aires Argentina Temple is a temple of the Church of Jesus Christ of Latter-day Saints located in Ciudad Evita, Buenos Aires Province, Argentina. Announced on April 2, 1980, by church president Spencer W. Kimball, it became the first temple in Argentina and the fourth in South America when it was dedicated by Thomas S. Monson in January 1986. The temple is on a 3.73-acre (1.51 ha) site near the Autopista Riccheri, with its grounds having landscaped gardens, a front fountain, six tall gray spires, and art glass that reflects Argentinian national colors.

The temple underwent a major renovation from 2009 to 2012, expanding to 28,299 sq ft and adding art glass incorporating blue and white hues from Argentina’s flag before its rededication by Henry B. Eyring. The rededication was preceded by an open house attended by more than 100,000 visitors and a cultural celebration featuring over 2,000 youth.

The temple has four instruction rooms, three sealing rooms, and a baptistry.

== History ==
The temple was announced April 2, 1980, during a First Presidency news conference led by Spencer W. Kimball. A groundbreaking and site dedication took place on April 20, 1983, presided over by Bruce R. McConkie of the Quorum of the Twelve Apostles.

Following construction, a public open house took place from December 17–24, 1985, with around 29,000 visitors touring the new building. The temple was dedicated January 17–19, 1986, in 11 sessions by Thomas S. Monson, a counselor in the First Presidency. It was the first temple built in Argentina, the fourth in South America, and the first dedicated by Monson. At the time, the temple served about 162,500 church members in 40 stakes across Argentina, Uruguay, and Paraguay.

On March 5, 1994, a three-story patron housing facility was dedicated by apsostle Joseph B. Wirthlin to accommodate temple attendees traveling long distances.

The temple was closed November 1, 2009, for extensive renovation and expansion. After the upgrades, a public open house was held from August 4–25, 2012. A cultural celebration was held on September 8, 2012, involving more than 2,000 youth, with the temple rededicated in three sessions the following day by Henry B. Eyring, first counselor in the First Presidency. M. Russell Ballard and D. Todd Christofferson of the Quorum of the Twelve also participated.

== Design and architecture ==
The temple is on approximately 3.73 acres (1.51 ha) in Ciudad Evita, surrounded by gardens, benches, and walking paths. A patron housing facility and distribution center adjoin the site, and the grounds previously included a missionary training center. The temple has a light light-gray granite exterior, with arched motifs, and six tall gray spires. During the 2009–2012 renovation, two new wings were added, new art glass installed, and triple-paned glazing introduced to reflect Argentina’s blue and white national colors. A redesigned fountain and landscaping were also added.

The temple has four instruction rooms, three sealing rooms, and a baptistry. Finishes include decorative painting and gold leaf, Argentine-style motifs, and custom woodwork in anigre and makore hardwoods. Seven cloths intended to cover altars were requested from local membership; they returned with 64, prompting M. Russell Ballard to remark on the "marvelous commitment of the Saints of South America was demonstrated by the dear sisters.” The temple has colors and art glass in blue, white, and gold, representing Argentina’s flag.

Extensive renovation began November 1, 2009, providing structural and aesthetic updates. Improvements included mechanical system upgrades, two new wings, interior redesign, new art glass, and a fountain at the entrance. The expansion increased the size from 17,687 to 28,299 square feet.

With the renovations completed, an open house from August 4–25, 2012, welcomed more than 100,000 visitors, followed by a rededication on September 9, 2012, by Henry B. Eyring.

== Community impact ==
During the 2012 open house, press tours and a conference were held for journalists from media organizations, promoting awareness of the temple’s purpose. The cultural celebration preceding the rededication included more than 2,000 youth, featuring music and dance that highlighted Argentine heritage, such as the country’s immigrant heritage, and “vaquero”, or cowboy culture, and the Latter-day Saint faith.

== Temple leadership and admittance ==
The church's temples are directed by a temple president and matron, each typically serving for a term of three years. The president and matron oversee the administration of temple operations and provide guidance and training for both temple patrons and staff. The first temple president was Ángel Abrea (who later became the church's first general authority from Latin America), with María V. Abrea serving as matron. As of 2024, Fernando D. Ortega is the president, with Irma E. Ortega serving as matron.

Before its 2012 rededication, a public open house was held from August 4–25, 2012 (excluding Sundays). Like all the church's temples, it is not used for Sunday worship services. To members of the church, temples are regarded as sacred houses of the Lord. Once dedicated, only church members with a current temple recommend can enter for worship.

== See also ==

Temples in and near Argentina
= Operating
= Under construction
= Announced
= Temporarily Closed

- Comparison of temples of The Church of Jesus Christ of Latter-day Saints
- List of temples of The Church of Jesus Christ of Latter-day Saints
- List of temples of The Church of Jesus Christ of Latter-day Saints by geographic region
- Temple architecture (Latter-day Saints)
- The Church of Jesus Christ of Latter-day Saints in Argentina
