= Comparison of temples (LDS Church) =

Below is a chronological list of temples of the Church of Jesus Christ of Latter-day Saints within sortable columns. In the church, a temple is a building dedicated to be a House of the Lord and is considered by church members to be the most sacred places on earth. Upon completion, temples are usually open to the public for a short period of time (an "open house"), and then each is dedicated as a "House of the Lord", after which only members with a current temple recommend are permitted to enter. Thus, they are not churches or meetinghouses, but rather specialized places of worship. The LDS Church has 385 temples in various phases, which includes 227 dedicated temples (221 operating, 6 undergoing renovations), 8 with dedications scheduled, 56 under construction, 8 with groundbreaking ceremonies scheduled, and 86 others announced (not yet under construction). Within temples, members of the church make covenants, receive instructions, and perform rituals and ordinances. Additionally, members consider the temple a place to commune with God, seek God's aid, understand God's will, and receive personal revelation.

The sortable columns used in this list allow easy comparisons of the different facts and features of each temple. For a list that includes pictures see this list of temples. There is also a list by geographic region with maps.

== List of temples ==
Note: Numbering of temples announced or under construction is tentative pending the dedication of the temple.

=== Physical comparison ===
The following table is a comparison table listing location and statistics for each temple.

#	Status	Name	Site	Floor	Height	Baptistries	Endowment rooms	Endowment Style	Sealing rooms	Style	Designer	Visitor center
1	Operating	St. George Utah Temple	6.5 acres (26,305 m^{2})	143,969 sq ft (13,375 m^{2})	80 ft (24 m)	1	3	stationary	18	Castellated Neo-Gothic	Truman O. Angell	Yes
2	Operating	Logan Utah Temple	9 acres (36,422 m^{2})	119,619 sq ft (11,113 m^{2})	170 ft (52 m)	1	4	stationary	11	Castellated Gothic	Truman O. Angell	
3	Operating	Manti Utah Temple	27 acres (109,265 m^{2})	74,792 sq ft (6,948 m^{2})	179 ft (55 m)	1	4	four-stage progressive	8		William H. Folsom	
4	Closed for renovation	Salt Lake Temple	10 acres (40,469 m^{2})	382,207 sq ft (35,508 m^{2})	222 ft (68 m)	2	5	stationary	22	Neo-Gothic, Romanesque Revival architecture	Truman O. Angell	Yes
5	Operating	Laie Hawaii Temple	11.4 acres (46,134 m^{2})	42,100 sq ft (3,911 m^{2})		1	4	four-stage progressive	6	inspired by Solomon's Temple, no spire. Prairie-style and Columbian	Hyrum Pope and Harold Burton	Yes
6	Operating	Cardston Alberta Temple	10 acres (40,469 m^{2})	88,562 sq ft (8,228 m^{2})	85 ft (26 m)	1	4	four-stage progressive	5		Hyrum Pope and Harold W. Burton	Yes
7	Operating	Mesa Arizona Temple	20 acres (80,937 m^{2})	113,916 sq ft (10,583 m^{2})	50 ft (15 m)	1	4	stationary	9	Neoclassical Architecture	Don Carlos Young, Jr. and Ramm Hansen	Yes
8	Operating	Idaho Falls Idaho Temple	7 acres (28,328 m^{2})	116,250 sq ft (10,800 m^{2})	143 ft (44 m)	1	4	four-stage progressive	9	Modern, center spire	John Fetzer, Sr.	Yes
9	Operating	Bern Switzerland Temple	7 acres (28,328 m^{2})	35,546 sq ft (3,302 m^{2})	140 ft (43 m)	1	4	stationary	7	Modern, single spire	Edward O. Anderson	
10	Operating	Los Angeles California Temple	13 acres (52,609 m^{2})	190,614 sq ft (17,709 m^{2})	257 ft (78 m)	1	4	four-stage progressive	10		Edward O. Anderson	Yes
11	Operating	Hamilton New Zealand Temple	86 acres (348,030 m^{2})	45,251 sq ft (4,204 m^{2})	157 ft (48 m)	1	2	stationary	8	Modern, single spire	Edward O. Anderson	Yes
12	Operating	London England Temple	32 acres (129,499 m^{2})	42,652 sq ft (3,963 m^{2})	190 ft (58 m)	1	4	stationary	7	Modern, single spire	Edward O. Anderson	Yes
13	Operating	Oakland California Temple	18.1 acres (73,248 m^{2})	80,157 sq ft (7,447 m^{2})	170 ft (52 m)	1	4	Movie, stationary	7	Main spire topped with Buddhist peace pagoda	Harold W. Burton	Yes
14	Operating	Ogden Utah Temple	9.96 acres (40,307 m^{2})	112,232 sq ft (10,427 m^{2})	180 ft (55 m)	1	6	Movie, stationary	11		Emil B. Fetzer	
15	Closed for renovation	Provo Utah Temple	17 acres (68,797 m^{2})	128,325 sq ft (11,922 m^{2})	175 ft (53 m)	1	6	Movie, stationary	12	Modern, center spire	Emil B. Fetzer	
16	Operating	Washington D.C. Temple	52 acres (210,437 m^{2})	156,558 sq ft (14,545 m^{2})	288 ft (88 m)	1	6	stationary	14	Modern six-spire design	Fred L. Markham, Harold K. Beecher, Henry P. Fetzer, and Keith W. Wilcox	Yes
17	Operating	São Paulo Brazil Temple	1.85 acres (7,487 m^{2})	59,246 sq ft (5,504 m^{2})		1	2	stationary	4	Modern, single spire	Emil B. Fetzer	
18	Operating	Tokyo Japan Temple	1.22 acres (4,937 m^{2})	53,997 sq ft (5,016 m^{2})	178 ft (54 m)	1	2	stationary	5	Modern, single spire	Emil B. Fetzer	Yes
19	Operating	Seattle Washington Temple	23.5 acres (95,101 m^{2})	110,000 sq ft (10,219 m^{2})	179 ft (55 m)	1	4	stationary	13	Modern, single spire	Emil B. Fetzer	
20	Operating	Jordan River Utah Temple	15 acres (60,703 m^{2})	148,236 sq ft (13,772 m^{2})	219 ft (67 m)	1	6	Movie, stationary	16	Modern, center spire	Emil B. Fetzer	
21	Operating	Atlanta Georgia Temple	9.6 acres (38,850 m^{2})	34,500 sq ft (3,205 m^{2})	93 ft (28 m)	1	4	two-stage progressive	5	Modern, single spire	Emil B. Fetzer	
22	Operating	Apia Samoa Temple	2 acres (8,094 m^{2})	18,691 sq ft (1,736 m^{2})	75 ft (23 m)	1	2	two-stage progressive	2	Classic Modern, single spire	Naylor, Wentworth, Lund	
23	Operating	Nuku'alofa Tonga Temple	1.2 acres (4,856 m^{2})	21,184 sq ft (1,968 m^{2})		1	2	stationary	3	Modern, single-spire design	Emil B. Fetzer	
24	Operating	Santiago Chile Temple	2.61 acres (10,562 m^{2})	20,831 sq ft (1,935 m^{2})	76 ft (23 m)	1	2	stationary	3	Modern, single-spire	Emil B. Fetzer	
25	Operating	Papeete Tahiti Temple	1.7 acres (6,880 m^{2})	12,150 sq ft (1,129 m^{2})	66 ft (20 m)	1	2	stationary	2	Sloping roof, single spire	Emil B. Fetzer	
26	Operating	Mexico City Mexico Temple	7 acres (28,328 m^{2})	116,642 sq ft (10,836 m^{2})	152 ft (46 m)	1	4	stationary	11	Modern Mayan, single spire	Emil B. Fetzer	Yes
27	Operating	Boise Idaho Temple	4.83 acres (19,546 m^{2})	35,868 sq ft (3,332 m^{2})	112 ft (34 m)	1	4	stationary	4	Sloping roof, six spire	Church A&E Services	
28	Operating	Sydney Australia Temple	3 acres (12,141 m^{2})	30,677 sq ft (2,850 m^{2})		1	2	stationary	3	Modern, single spire	Emil B. Fetzer and R. Lindsay Little	
29	Operating	Manila Philippines Temple	3.5 acres (14,164 m^{2})	26,683 sq ft (2,479 m^{2})	115 ft (35 m)	1	4	stationary	3	Sloping roof, six spire	Church A&E Services with Felipe M. Mendoza & Partners	
30	Operating	Dallas Texas Temple	6 acres (24,281 m^{2})	44,207 sq ft (4,107 m^{2})	95 ft (29 m)	1	5	stationary	4	Sloping roof, six spire	Church A&E Services and West & Humphries	
31	Operating	Taipei Taiwan Temple	0.5 acres (2,023 m^{2})	9,945 sq ft (924 m^{2})	126 ft (38 m)	1	4	stationary	3	Sloping roof, six spire	Church A&E Services with Philip fei & Associations	
32	Operating	Guatemala City Guatemala Temple	1.4 acres (5,666 m^{2})	11,610 sq ft (1,079 m^{2})	126 ft (38 m)	1	4	stationary	3	Sloping roof, six-spire	Church A&E Services and Jose Asturias	
33	Operating	Freiberg Germany Temple	3.58 acres (14,488 m^{2})	21,500 sq ft (1,997 m^{2})		1	2	stationary	2	Sloping roof, single spire	Emil B. Fetzer and Rolf Metzner	
34	Closed for renovation	Stockholm Sweden Temple	4.47 acres (18,089 m^{2})	31,000 sq ft (2,880 m^{2})	112 ft (34 m)	1	4	stationary	3	Sloping roof, six spire	John Sjostrom and Church A&E Services	
35	Operating	Chicago Illinois Temple	13 acres (52,609 m^{2})	37,062 sq ft (3,443 m^{2})	112 ft (34 m)	1	5	stationary	3	Sloping roof, six spire	Wight & Co and Church A&E Services	
36	Operating	Johannesburg South Africa Temple	1 acre (4,047 m^{2})	19,184 sq ft (1,782 m^{2})	112 ft (34 m)	1	4	stationary	3	Sloping roof, six-spire	Church A&E Services and Halford & Halford	
37	Operating	Seoul Korea Temple	1 acre (4,047 m^{2})	28,057 sq ft (2,607 m^{2})	112 ft (34 m)	1	4	stationary	3	Sloping roof, six spire	Church A&E Services and Komerican Architects	yes
38	Operating	Lima Peru Temple	4.5 acres (18,211 m^{2})	9,600 sq ft (892 m^{2})	112 ft (34 m)	1	4	stationary	3	Sloping roof, six-spire	Jesse M. Harris	
39	Operating	Buenos Aires Argentina Temple	3.73 acres (15,095 m^{2})	30,659 sq ft (2,848 m^{2})	112 ft (34 m)	1	4	stationary	3	Sloping roof, six spire	Ramon Paez and Church A&E Services	
40	Operating	Denver Colorado Temple	7.5 acres (30,351 m^{2})	29,177 sq ft (2,711 m^{2})	90 ft (27 m)	1	4	stationary	6	Modern, single spire	Church A&E Services and Bobby R. Thomas	
41	Operating	Frankfurt Germany Temple	5.6 acres (22,662 m^{2})	32,895 sq ft (3,056 m^{2})	82 ft (25 m)	1	4	stationary	4	Sloping roof, single detached spire	Church A&E Services and Borchers-Metzner-Kramer	
42	Operating	Portland Oregon Temple	7.3 acres (29,542 m^{2})	80,500 sq ft (7,479 m^{2})	181 ft (55 m)	1	4	stationary	14	Sloping roof, six spire	Leland A. Gray	Yes
43	Operating	Las Vegas Nevada Temple	10.3 acres (41,683 m^{2})	80,350 sq ft (7,465 m^{2})	137 ft (42 m)	1	4	stationary	6	Sloping roof, six spire	Tate & Snyder Architects	
44	Operating	Toronto Ontario Temple	13.4 acres (54,228 m^{2})	55,558 sq ft (5,162 m^{2})	171 ft (52 m)	1	4	stationary	6	Modern, single spire	Allward-Gouinlock Inc.	
45	Operating	San Diego California Temple	7.2 acres (29,137 m^{2})	58,005 sq ft (5,389 m^{2})	169 ft (52 m)	1	4	stationary	6	Modern, two-tower	William S. Lewis, Jr.	
46	Closed for renovation	Orlando Florida Temple	13 acres (52,609 m^{2})	70,000 sq ft (6,503 m^{2})	165 ft (50 m)	1	4	stationary	5	Classic modern, center spire	Scott Partnership Architects	
47	Operating	Bountiful Utah Temple	9 acres (36,422 m^{2})	104,000 sq ft (9,662 m^{2})	176 ft (54 m)	1	4	stationary	8	Classic modern, center spire	Allen B. Erekson	
48	Operating	Hong Kong China Temple	0.31 acres (1,255 m^{2})	51,921 sq ft (4,824 m^{2})	135 ft (41 m)	1	2	stationary	2	Hong Kong Colonial, single spire	Liang Peddle Thorpe Architects	
49	Operating	Mount Timpanogos Utah Temple	16.7 acres (67,583 m^{2})	107,240 sq ft (9,963 m^{2})	190 ft (58 m)	1	4	stationary	8	Classic modern, single spire	Allen Erekson, Keith Stepan, and Church A&E Services	
50	Operating	St. Louis Missouri Temple	14 acres (56,656 m^{2})	58,749 sq ft (5,458 m^{2})	150 ft (46 m)	1	4	stationary	4	Classic modern, single spire	Chiodini Associates	Yes
51	Operating	Vernal Utah Temple	1.6 acres (6,475 m^{2})	38,771 sq ft (3,602 m^{2})		1	2	Movie, two-stage progressive	3	Existing building adapted	FFKR Architects	
52	Operating	Preston England Temple	32 acres (129,499 m^{2})	69,630 sq ft (6,469 m^{2})	159 ft (48 m)	1	4	two-stage progressive	4	Modern, single spire	Church A&E Services	no
53	Operating	Monticello Utah Temple	1.33 acres (5,382 m^{2})	11,225 sq ft (1,043 m^{2})	66 ft (20 m)	1	2	Movie, two-stage progressive	2	Smaller and remote area 1	Church A&E Services	
54	Operating	Anchorage Alaska Temple	5.4 acres (21,853 m^{2})	11,937 sq ft (1,109 m^{2})	71 ft (22 m)	1	2	two-stage progressive	1		McCool Carlson Green	
55	Operating	Colonia Juárez Chihuahua Mexico Temple	2.56 acres (10,360 m^{2})	6,800 sq ft (632 m^{2})	71 ft (22 m)	1	1	stationary	1	Smaller and remote area 1	Alvaro Inigo and Church A&E Services	
56	Operating	Madrid Spain Temple	3.5 acres (14,164 m^{2})	45,800 sq ft (4,255 m^{2})		1	4	stationary	4	Classic modern, single-spire	Arquitechior Langdon, SA.	
57	Operating	Bogotá Colombia Temple	3.71 acres (15,014 m^{2})	53,500 sq ft (4,970 m^{2})	124 ft (38 m)	1	4	stationary	3	Classic modern, single spire	Cerrano y Gomez Cuellar	
58	Operating	Guayaquil Ecuador Temple	6.2 acres (25,091 m^{2})	45,000 sq ft (4,181 m^{2})		1	4	stationary	3	Classic modern, single spire	Rafael Velez Calisto, Architects & Consultants and Church A&E Services	
59	Operating	Spokane Washington Temple	2 acres (8,094 m^{2})	10,700 sq ft (994 m^{2})	71 ft (22 m)	1	2	two-stage progressive	2			
60	Operating	Columbus Ohio Temple	5 acres (20,234 m^{2})	11,745 sq ft (1,091 m^{2})	71 ft (22 m)	1	2	two-stage progressive	2	Classic modern, single spire	Firestone J. Mullin	
61	Temporarily closed	Bismarck North Dakota Temple	1.6 acres (6,475 m^{2})	10,700 sq ft (994 m^{2})	71 ft (22 m)	1	2	two-stage progressive	2	Classic modern, single spire	Ritterbush–Ellig–Hulsing and Church A&E Services	
62	Operating	Columbia South Carolina Temple	3.6 acres (14,569 m^{2})	10,700 sq ft (994 m^{2})	71 ft (22 m)	1	2	two-stage progressive	2	Classic modern, single spire	Mike Watson	
63	Operating	Detroit Michigan Temple	6.34 acres (25,657 m^{2})	10,700 sq ft (994 m^{2})	71 ft (22 m)	1	2	two-stage progressive	2	Classic modern, single spire	John Coakley, Sr.	
64	Operating	Halifax Nova Scotia Temple	2 acres (8,094 m^{2})	10,700 sq ft (994 m^{2})	71 ft (22 m)	1	2	two-stage progressive	2	Classic modern, single spire	L.A. Beaubien and Associates, and Church A&E Services	
65	Operating	Regina Saskatchewan Temple	1 acre (4,047 m^{2})	10,700 sq ft (994 m^{2})	71 ft (22 m)	1	2	two-stage progressive	2	Classic modern, single spire	Roger B. Mitchell and Church A&E Services	
66	Operating	Billings Montana Temple	10 acres (40,469 m^{2})	33,800 sq ft (3,140 m^{2})	120 ft (37 m)	1	2	two-stage progressive	3	Classic modern, single spire	CTA Architects Engineers	
67	Operating	Edmonton Alberta Temple	1 acre (4,047 m^{2})	10,700 sq ft (994 m^{2})	71 ft (22 m)	1	2	two-stage progressive	2	Classic modern, single spire	Robert Bennett and Church A&E Services	
68	Operating	Raleigh North Carolina Temple	3.17 acres (12,829 m^{2})	12,864 sq ft (1,195 m^{2})	71 ft (22 m)	1	2	two-stage progressive	2	Classic modern, single spire	Dan Dills - Architect: Dills and Ainscuff. Contractor: Walbridge Aldinger.	
69	Operating	St. Paul Minnesota Temple	7.5 acres (30,351 m^{2})	10,700 sq ft (994 m^{2})	71 ft (22 m)	1	2	two-stage progressive	2	Classic modern, single spire	Ed Kodet, Jr. and Church A&E Services	
70	Closed for renovation	Kona Hawaii Temple	7.02 acres (28,409 m^{2})	12,325 sq ft (1,145 m^{2})	71 ft (22 m)	1	2	two-stage progressive	2	Classic modern, single spire	Church A & E Services, Bob Lowder	
71	Operating	Ciudad Juárez Mexico Temple	1.64 acres (6,637 m^{2})	10,700 sq ft (994 m^{2})	71 ft (22 m)	1	2	two-stage progressive	2	Classic modern, single spire	Alvaro Inigo and Church A&E Services	
72	Operating	Hermosillo Sonora Mexico Temple	1.54 acres (6,232 m^{2})	10,769 sq ft (1,000 m^{2})	71 ft (22 m)	1	2	two-stage progressive	2	Classic modern, single spire	Alvaro Inigo and Church A&E Services	
73	Operating	Albuquerque New Mexico Temple	8.5 acres (34,398 m^{2})	34,245 sq ft (3,181 m^{2})	114 ft (35 m)	1	2	stationary	3	Classic modern, single spire	Fanning Bard & Tatum	
74	Operating	Oaxaca Mexico Temple	1.87 acres (7,568 m^{2})	10,700 sq ft (994 m^{2})	71 ft (22 m)	1	2	two-stage progressive	2	Classic modern, single spire	Alvaro Inigo and Church A&E Services	
75	Operating	Tuxtla Gutiérrez Mexico Temple	1.56 acres (6,313 m^{2})	10,700 sq ft (994 m^{2})	71 ft (22 m)	1	2	two-stage progressive	2	Classic modern, single spire	Alvaro Inigo and Church A&E Services	
76	Operating	Louisville Kentucky Temple	3 acres (12,141 m^{2})	10,700 sq ft (994 m^{2})	71 ft (22 m)	1	2	two-stage progressive	2	Classic modern, single spire	Firestone Jaros Mullin--Mike Karpinski Architect	
77	Operating	Palmyra New York Temple	5 acres (20,234 m^{2})	10,900 sq ft (1,013 m^{2})	71 ft (22 m)	1	2	two-stage progressive	2		Dave A. Richards; Church A&E Services	Yes
78	Operating	Fresno California Temple	2.34 acres (9,470 m^{2})	10,700 sq ft (994 m^{2})	71 ft (22 m)	1	2	two-stage progressive	2	Classic modern, single spire	Paul Stommel AIA	
79	Operating	Medford Oregon Temple	2 acres (8,094 m^{2})	10,700 sq ft (994 m^{2})	71 ft (22 m)	1	2	two-stage progressive	2	Classic modern, single spire	Dan Park, Church A&E Services, Joseph E. Marty, Architect	
80	Operating	Memphis Tennessee Temple	6.35 acres (25,698 m^{2})	10,890 sq ft (1,012 m^{2})	71 ft (22 m)	1	2	two-stage progressive	2	Classic modern, single spire	Dusty Driver; Church A&E Services	
81	Operating	Reno Nevada Temple	7.9 acres (31,970 m^{2})	10,700 sq ft (994 m^{2})	71 ft (22 m)	1	2	two-stage progressive	2	Classic modern, single spire	Church A&E Services	
82	Operating	Cochabamba Bolivia Temple	6.67 acres (26,993 m^{2})	33,302 sq ft (3,094 m^{2})		1	2	stationary	3	Classic modern, single spire	BSW and Church A&E Services	
83	Operating	Tampico Mexico Temple	2.96 acres (11,979 m^{2})	10,700 sq ft (994 m^{2})	71 ft (22 m)	1	2	two-stage progressive	2	Classic modern, single spire	Alvaro Inigo and Church A&E Services	
84	Operating	Nashville Tennessee Temple	6.86 acres (27,761 m^{2})	10,700 sq ft (994 m^{2})	71 ft (22 m)	1	2	two-stage progressive	2	Classic modern, single spire	Robert Waldrip and Church A&E Services	
85	Operating	Villahermosa Mexico Temple	1.36 acres (5,504 m^{2})	10,700 sq ft (994 m^{2})	71 ft (22 m)	1	2	two-stage progressive	2	Classic modern, single spire	Alvaro Inigo and Church A&E Services	
86	Operating	Montreal Quebec Temple	2.4 acres (9,712 m^{2})	11,550 sq ft (1,073 m^{2})	71 ft (22 m)	1	2	two-stage progressive	2	Classic modern, single spire	Andrij Serbyn, Fichten Soiferman and Church A&E Services	
87	Operating	San José Costa Rica Temple	1.93 acres (7,810 m^{2})	10,700 sq ft (994 m^{2})	71 ft (22 m)	1	2	two-stage progressive	2	Classic modern, single spire	Álvaro Íñigo and Church A&E Services	
88	Operating	Fukuoka Japan Temple	1.25 acres (5,059 m^{2})	10,700 sq ft (994 m^{2})	71 ft (22 m)	1	2	two-stage progressive	2	Smaller and remote area 3	Kanji Moriya and Church A&E Services	
89	Operating	Adelaide Australia Temple	6.94 acres (28,085 m^{2})	10,700 sq ft (994 m^{2})	71 ft (22 m)	1	2	two-stage progressive	2	Classic modern, single spire	Simon Drew	
90	Operating	Melbourne Australia Temple	5.98 acres (24,200 m^{2})	10,700 sq ft (994 m^{2})	71 ft (22 m)	1	2	two-stage progressive	2	Classic modern, single spire	Warwick Tempany and Church A&E Services	
91	Operating	Suva Fiji Temple	4.7 acres (19,020 m^{2})	12,755 sq ft (1,185 m^{2})	71 ft (22 m)	1	2	two-stage progressive	2	Classic modern, single spire	Conway Beg	
92	Operating	Mérida Mexico Temple	1.53 acres (6,192 m^{2})	10,700 sq ft (994 m^{2})	71 ft (22 m)	1	2	two-stage progressive	2	Classic modern, single spire	Alvaro Inigo and Church A&E Services	
93	Operating	Veracruz Mexico Temple	3.39 acres (13,719 m^{2})	10,700 sq ft (994 m^{2})	71 ft (22 m)	1	2	two-stage progressive	2	Classic modern, single spire	Alvaro Inigo and Church A&E Services	
94	Operating	Baton Rouge Louisiana Temple	6.3 acres (25,495 m^{2})	10,890 sq ft (1,012 m^{2})	71 ft (22 m)	1	2	two-stage progressive	2	Classic modern, single spire	Paul Tessier & Associates and Church A&E Services.	
95	Operating	Oklahoma City Oklahoma Temple	1 acre (4,047 m^{2})	10,890 sq ft (1,012 m^{2})	71 ft (22 m)	1	2	two-stage progressive	2	Classic modern, single spire	Richard Lueb and Church A&E Services	
96	Operating	Caracas Venezuela Temple	0.5 acres (2,023 m^{2})	15,332 sq ft (1,424 m^{2})	71 ft (22 m)	1	2	two-stage progressive	2	Classic modern, single spire	Taller de Arquitectura and Church A&E Services	
97	Operating	Houston Texas Temple	11 acres (44,515 m^{2})	33,970 sq ft (3,156 m^{2})	159 ft (48 m)	1	2	stationary	3	Classic modern, single spire	Spencer Partnership Architects and Church A&E Services	
98	Operating	Birmingham Alabama Temple	5.6 acres (22,662 m^{2})	10,700 sq ft (994 m^{2})	71 ft (22 m)	1	2	two-stage progressive	2	Classic modern, single spire	Robert Waldrip and Church A&E Services	
99	Operating	Santo Domingo Dominican Republic Temple	6.42 acres (25,981 m^{2})	67,000 sq ft (6,225 m^{2})		1	2	stationary	2	Classic modern, single spire	Scott Partnership and Church A&E Services	
100	Operating	Boston Massachusetts Temple	8 acres (32,375 m^{2})	69,600 sq ft (6,466 m^{2})	139 ft (42 m)	1	4	two-stage progressive	4	Classic modern, single spire	Tsoi/Kobus & Associates and Church A&E Services	
101	Operating	Recife Brazil Temple	5.59 acres (22,622 m^{2})	37,200 sq ft (3,456 m^{2})		1	2	stationary	3	Classic modern, single spire	Jerônimo da Cunha Lima (J&P Arquitetos Ltda.) and Church A&E Services	
102	Operating	Porto Alegre Brazil Temple	2 acres (8,094 m^{2})	10,700 sq ft (994 m^{2})	71 ft (22 m)	1	2	two-stage progressive	2	Classic modern, single spire	Andre Belo de Faria and Church A&E Services	
103	Operating	Montevideo Uruguay Temple	1.59 acres (6,435 m^{2})	10,700 sq ft (994 m^{2})	71 ft (22 m)	1	2	two-stage progressive	2	Classic modern, single spire	Edvardo Signorelli	
104	Operating	Winter Quarters Nebraska Temple	1.92 acres (7,770 m^{2})	16,000 sq ft (1,486 m^{2})	86 ft (26 m)	1	2	two-stage progressive	2	Smaller and remote area 2 story	Dan Reinhardt	Yes
105	Operating	Guadalajara Mexico Temple	2.69 acres (10,886 m^{2})	10,700 sq ft (994 m^{2})	71 ft (22 m)	1	2	two-stage progressive	2	Classic modern, single spire	Alvaro Inigo and Church A&E Services	
106	Operating	Perth Australia Temple	2.76 acres (11,169 m^{2})	10,700 sq ft (994 m^{2})	71 ft (22 m)	1	2	two-stage progressive	2	Classic modern, single spire	Christou Cassella & JEC	
107	Operating	Columbia River Washington Temple	2.88 acres (11,655 m^{2})	16,880 sq ft (1,568 m^{2})		1	2	two-stage progressive	2		A & E Services, Joseph E. Marty Architect	
108	Operating	Snowflake Arizona Temple	7.5 acres (30,351 m^{2})	18,621 sq ft (1,730 m^{2})	60 ft (18 m)	1	2	two-stage progressive	2	Smaller and remote area 3	Trest Polina	
109	Operating	Lubbock Texas Temple	2.7 acres (10,927 m^{2})	16,498 sq ft (1,533 m^{2})		1	2	two-stage progressive	2	Smaller and remote area 3	Tisdel Minckler and Associates.	
110	Operating	Monterrey Mexico Temple	7.78 acres (31,485 m^{2})	16,498 sq ft (1,533 m^{2})		1	2	two-stage progressive	2	Smaller and remote area 3	Alvaro Inigo	
111	Operating	Campinas Brazil Temple	6.18 acres (25,010 m^{2})	49,100 sq ft (4,562 m^{2})		1	4	two-stage progressive	3	Classic modern, single spire	JCL Arquitetos Ltd., and Church A&E Services	
112	Operating	Asunción Paraguay Temple	1.13 acres (4,573 m^{2})	11,906 sq ft (1,106 m^{2})	71 ft (22 m)	1	2	two-stage progressive	2	Classic modern, single spire	Eduardo Signorelli	
113	Operating	Nauvoo Illinois Temple	3.3 acres (13,355 m^{2})	54,000 sq ft (5,017 m^{2})	162 ft (49 m)	1	4	four-stage progressive	6	Greek revival	FFKR Architecture based on design by William Weeks	Yes
114	Operating	The Hague Netherlands Temple	2.7 acres (10,927 m^{2})	14,477 sq ft (1,345 m^{2})	71 ft (22 m)	1	2	two-stage progressive	2	Classic modern, single spire	Albert van Eerde	
115	Operating	Brisbane Australia Temple	0.86 acres (3,480 m^{2})	10,700 sq ft (994 m^{2})	71 ft (22 m)	1	2	two-stage progressive	2	Classic modern, single spire	Phillips, Smith, Conwell	
116	Operating	Redlands California Temple	4.6 acres (18,616 m^{2})	17,300 sq ft (1,607 m^{2})		1	2	movie, two-stage progressive	3	Smaller and remote area 3	Lloyd Platt & Associates with Higginson & Cartozian	
117	Operating	Accra Ghana Temple	6 acres (24,281 m^{2})	17,500 sq ft (1,626 m^{2})	90 ft (27 m)	1	2	two-stage progressive	2	Smaller and remote area 3	ARUP	
118	Operating	Copenhagen Denmark Temple	0.6 acres (2,428 m^{2})	25,000 sq ft (2,323 m^{2})		1	2	two-stage progressive	2	Existing building adapted	Arcito	
119	Closed for renovation	Manhattan New York Temple	0.3 acres (1,214 m^{2})	20,630 sq ft (1,917 m^{2})	120 ft (37 m)	1	2	two-stage progressive	2	Existing building adapted	Frank Fernandez	
120	Operating	San Antonio Texas Temple	5.5 acres (22,258 m^{2})	16,800 sq ft (1,561 m^{2})	115 ft (35 m)	1	2	two-stage progressive	2	Smaller and remote area 3	Rehler, Vaughn & Koone	
121	Operating	Aba Nigeria Temple	6.3 acres (25,495 m^{2})	11,500 sq ft (1,068 m^{2})	72 ft (22 m)	1	2	two-stage progressive	2	Classic modern, single spire	Adeniyi Coker Consultants Limited	
122	Operating	Newport Beach California Temple	8.8 acres (35,612 m^{2})	17,800 sq ft (1,654 m^{2})	90 ft (27 m)	1	2	two-stage progressive	3	Smaller and remote area 3	Lloyd Platt and Allen Erekson	
123	Operating	Sacramento California Temple	46 acres (186,155 m^{2})	19,500 sq ft (1,812 m^{2})	131 ft (40 m)	1	2	two-stage progressive	4	Classic modern, single spire	Joseph Marty Architect, Brian Everett and Maury Maher	
124	Operating	Helsinki Finland Temple	7.4 acres (29,947 m^{2})	16,350 sq ft (1,519 m^{2})	139 ft (42 m)	1	2	two-stage progressive	2	Smaller and remote area 3	Evata Architects	
125	Operating	Rexburg Idaho Temple	10 acres (40,469 m^{2})	57,504 sq ft (5,342 m^{2})	169 ft (52 m)	1	4	two-stage progressive	5	Classic modern, single-spire design	Architectural Nexus; Bob Petroff	
126	Operating	Curitiba Brazil Temple	8.15 acres (32,982 m^{2})	27,850 sq ft (2,587 m^{2})	125 ft (38 m)	1	2	two-stage progressive	2	Classic modern, single-spire	Jeronimo da Cunha Lima and GSBS	
127	Operating	Panama City Panama Temple	6.96 acres (28,166 m^{2})	18,943 sq ft (1,760 m^{2})	111 ft (34 m)	1	2	two-stage progressive	2	Classic modern, single spire	Mallol & Mallol and Naylor W. Lund	
128	Operating	Twin Falls Idaho Temple	9.1 acres (36,826 m^{2})	31,245 sq ft (2,903 m^{2})	159 ft (48 m)	1	2	two-stage progressive	3	Classic modern, single-spire design	MHTN Architects, Inc	
129	Operating	Draper Utah Temple	12 acres (48,562 m^{2})	58,300 sq ft (5,416 m^{2})	168.67 ft (51 m)	1	4	two-stage progressive	5	Classic modern, single-spire design	FFKR Architects	
130	Operating	Oquirrh Mountain Utah Temple	11 acres (44,515 m^{2})	60,000 sq ft (5,574 m^{2})	183 ft (56 m)	1	4	two-stage progressive	6	Classic modern, single-spire design	Naylor Wentworth	
131	Operating	Vancouver British Columbia Temple	11.6 acres (46,944 m^{2})	28,165 sq ft (2,617 m^{2})	140 ft (43 m)	1	2	two-stage progressive	2	Classic modern, single-spire design	Abbarch Architecture and GSBS	
132	Operating	Gila Valley Arizona Temple	17 acres (68,797 m^{2})	18,561 sq ft (1,724 m^{2})	100 ft (30 m)	1	2	two-stage progressive	2	Classic modern, single-spire design	Gregory B. Lambright	
133	Operating	Cebu City Philippines Temple	11.6 acres (46,944 m^{2})	29,556 sq ft (2,746 m^{2})	140 ft (43 m)	1	2	two-stage progressive	2	Classic modern, single spire	Architectural Nexus and Recio & Casa Architects	
134	Operating	Kyiv Ukraine Temple	12.35 acres (49,979 m^{2})	22,184 sq ft (2,061 m^{2})	137.8 ft (42 m)	1	2	Two-stage progressive	2	Classic modern, single spire	MHTN and Strabag AG	
135	Operating	San Salvador El Salvador Temple	6.5 acres (26,305 m^{2})	27,986 sq ft (2,600 m^{2})		1	2	two-stage progressive	2	Single attached central spire with an angel Moroni statue		
136	Operating	Quetzaltenango Guatemala Temple	6.47 acres (26,183 m^{2})	21,085 sq ft (1,959 m^{2})	80 ft (24 m)	1	2	two-stage progressive	2	Single attached tower with an angel Moroni statue	Naylor Wentworth Lund Architects	
137	Operating	Kansas City Missouri Temple	8.05 acres (32,577 m^{2})	32,000 sq ft (2,973 m^{2})	150 ft (46 m)	1	2	two-stage progressive	3	Two attached end spires with an angel Moroni statue		
138	Operating	Manaus Brazil Temple	7.7 acres (31,161 m^{2})	32,032 sq ft (2,976 m^{2})	126 ft (38 m)	1	2	two-stage progressive	2	Single attached end spire with an angel Moroni statue		
139	Operating	Brigham City Utah Temple	3.14 acres (12,707 m^{2})	36,000 sq ft (3,345 m^{2})	165 ft (50 m)	1	2	two-stage progressive	3	Classic modern, two-spire design		
140	Operating	Calgary Alberta Temple	10.17 acres (41,157 m^{2})	33,000 sq ft (3,066 m^{2})	115 ft (35 m)	1	2	two-stage progressive	3	Classic modern, single-spire design		
141	Operating	Tegucigalpa Honduras Temple	13.6 acres (55,037 m^{2})	28,254 sq ft (2,625 m^{2})	135 ft (41 m)	1	2	two-stage progressive	2	Classic modern, single spire		
142	Operating	Gilbert Arizona Temple	15.38 acres (62,241 m^{2})	85,326 sq ft (7,927 m^{2})	195 ft (59 m)	1	3	stationary	7	Single attached central spire with an angel Moroni statue		
143	Operating	Fort Lauderdale Florida Temple	16.82 acres (68,068 m^{2})	30,500 sq ft (2,834 m^{2})	100 ft (30 m)	1	2	two-stage progressive	3	Single attached end spire with an angel Moroni statue		
144	Operating	Phoenix Arizona Temple	5.19 acres (21,003 m^{2})	64,870 sq ft (6,027 m^{2})	90 ft (27 m)	1	2	two-stage progressive	4	Single attached central spire with an angel Moroni statue		
145	Operating	Córdoba Argentina Temple	5.18 acres (20,963 m^{2})	34,369 sq ft (3,193 m^{2})		1	2	two-stage progressive	2			
146	Operating	Payson Utah Temple	10.63 acres (43,018 m^{2})	96,630 sq ft (8,977 m^{2})		1	3		7			
147	Operating	Trujillo Peru Temple	8.9 acres (36,017 m^{2})	28,200 sq ft (2,620 m^{2})	91 ft (28 m)	1	2	two-stage progressive	2			
148	Operating	Indianapolis Indiana Temple	18.11 acres (73,289 m^{2})	34,000 sq ft (3,159 m^{2})	106.3 ft (32 m)	1	2	two-stage progressive	2			
149	Operating	Tijuana Mexico Temple	9.4 acres (38,040 m^{2})	33,367 sq ft (3,100 m^{2})	151 ft (46 m)	1	2	two-stage progressive	2			
150	Operating	Provo City Center Temple	5.6 acres (22,662 m^{2})	85,084 sq ft (7,905 m^{2})	150 ft (46 m)	1	3	Two-stage progressive	5			
151	Operating	Sapporo Japan Temple	9.8 acres (39,659 m^{2})	48,480 sq ft (4,504 m^{2})	127 ft (39 m)	1	2	two-stage progressive	3			
152	Operating	Philadelphia Pennsylvania Temple	1.6 acres (6,475 m^{2})	61,466 sq ft (5,710 m^{2})	208.2 ft (63 m)	1	2	two-stage progressive	4			
153	Operating	Fort Collins Colorado Temple	15.69 acres (63,495 m^{2})	42,000 sq ft (3,902 m^{2})	112 ft (34 m)	1	2	two-stage progressive	3			
154	Operating	Star Valley Wyoming Temple	43.6 acres (176,443 m^{2})	18,609 sq ft (1,729 m^{2})	123 ft (37 m)	1	1	stationary	1	Single attached end spire with an angel Moroni statue		
155	Operating	Hartford Connecticut Temple	11.3 acres (45,729 m^{2})	32,246 sq ft (2,996 m^{2})	117.2 ft (36 m)	1	2	two-stage progressive	2			
156	Operating	Paris France Temple	2.26 acres (9,146 m^{2})	44,175 sq ft (4,104 m^{2})		1	2	two-stage progressive	3			Yes
157	Operating	Tucson Arizona Temple	7 acres (28,328 m^{2})	38,216 sq ft (3,550 m^{2})		1	2		2	Single attached central dome with an angel Moroni statue		
158	Operating	Meridian Idaho Temple	15.73 acres (63,657 m^{2})	67,331 sq ft (6,255 m^{2})	120.2 ft (37 m)	1	3	two-stage progressive	5			
159	Operating	Cedar City Utah Temple	9.5 acres (38,445 m^{2})	42,657 sq ft (3,963 m^{2})	160.5 ft (49 m)	1	2		3		Architectural Nexus, Salt Lake City, Utah	
160	Operating	Concepción Chile Temple	4.06 acres (16,430 m^{2})	23,095 sq ft (2,146 m^{2})	124 ft (38 m)	1	2		2	Neoclassical, 1-spire		
161	Operating	Barranquilla Colombia Temple	5.93 acres (23,998 m^{2})	25,349 sq ft (2,355 m^{2})	107 ft (33 m)	1	2		1	Republican (Neoclassic)		
162	Operating	Rome Italy Temple	14.5 acres (58,679 m^{2})	41,010 sq ft (3,810 m^{2})	156.25 ft (48 m)	1	2		3	Classic modern, two-spire design		Yes
163	Operating	Kinshasa Democratic Republic of the Congo Temple	5 acres (20,234 m^{2})	12,000 sq ft (1,115 m^{2})		1	1		1			
164	Operating	Fortaleza Brazil Temple	10 acres (40,469 m^{2})	36,000 sq ft (3,345 m^{2})		1	2		2			
165	Operating	Port-au-Prince Haiti Temple	1.77 acres (7,163 m^{2})	10,396 sq ft (966 m^{2})		1	1		1			
166	Operating	Lisbon Portugal Temple	4.6 acres (18,616 m^{2})	23,730 sq ft (2,205 m^{2})	143 ft (44 m)	1	2		1		Simão Silva, ACS Architects	Yes
167	Operating	Arequipa Peru Temple	7.91 acres (32,011 m^{2})	26,969 sq ft (2,506 m^{2})		1	2		2			
168	Operating	Durban South Africa Temple	14.49 acres (58,639 m^{2})	19,860 sq ft (1,845 m^{2})	97.4 ft (30 m)	1	1		1			
169	Operating	Winnipeg Manitoba Temple	7.7 acres (31,161 m^{2})	16,100 sq ft (1,496 m^{2})	105 ft (32 m)	1	1		1			
170	Operating	Pocatello Idaho Temple	10.94 acres (44,273 m^{2})	71,125 sq ft (6,608 m^{2})	196.5 ft (60 m)	1	4	Stationary	4			
171	Operating	Rio de Janeiro Brazil Temple	9.44 acres (38,202 m^{2})	29,966 sq ft (2,784 m^{2})	155.4 ft (47 m)	1	2		2			
172	Operating	Yigo Guam Temple	5.8 acres (23,472 m^{2})	6,861 sq ft (637 m^{2})	74 ft (23 m)	1	1		1			
173	Operating	Praia Cape Verde Temple	4.46 acres (18,049 m^{2})	8,759 sq ft (814 m^{2})	80 ft (24 m)	1	1		1			
174	Operating	Belém Brazil Temple	6.7 acres (27,114 m^{2})	28,675 sq ft (2,664 m^{2})	89 ft (27 m)	1	2		2			
175	Operating	Quito Ecuador Temple	3.96 acres (16,026 m^{2})	36,780 sq ft (3,417 m^{2})	97 ft (30 m)	1	2		2			
176	Operating	San Juan Puerto Rico Temple	2.97 acres (12,019 m^{2})	6,988 sq ft (649 m^{2})	74 ft (23 m)	1	1		1			
177	Operating	Richmond Virginia Temple	12 acres (48,562 m^{2})	39,202 sq ft (3,642 m^{2})	164 ft (50 m)	1	4		3		Lanny Herron	
178	Operating	Helena Montana Temple	4.75 acres (19,223 m^{2})	9,794 sq ft (910 m^{2})	96.75 ft (29 m)	1	1		1			
179	Operating	Saratoga Springs Utah Temple	22.71 acres (91,904 m^{2})	97,836 sq ft (9,089 m^{2})	199.75 ft (61 m)	1	4		6			
180	Operating	Brasília Brazil Temple	6 acres (24,281 m^{2})	25,000 sq ft (2,323 m^{2})		1	2		2			
181	Operating	Bentonville Arkansas Temple	18.62 acres (75,352 m^{2})	28,472 sq ft (2,645 m^{2})	111.67 ft (34 m)	1	2		2			
182	Operating	Moses Lake Washington Temple	17.2 acres (69,606 m^{2})	28,933 sq ft (2,688 m^{2})	117.5 ft (36 m)	1	2		2			
183	Operating	McAllen Texas Temple	10.61 acres (42,937 m^{2})	27,897 sq ft (2,592 m^{2})	108 ft (33 m)	1	2		2			No
184	Operating	Feather River California Temple	9.24 acres (37,393 m^{2})	41,665 sq ft (3,871 m^{2})	135 ft (41 m)	1	4		3			No
185	Operating	Bangkok Thailand Temple	1.77 acres (7,163 m^{2})	48,525 sq ft (4,508 m^{2})	242 ft (74 m)					Central spire surrounded by eight smaller spires		
186	Temporarily closed	Okinawa Japan Temple	0.55 acres (2,226 m^{2})	12,437 sq ft (1,155 m^{2})	105 ft (32 m)	1	1		1		MGLM	
187	Operating	Lima Peru Los Olivos Temple	2.46 acres (9,955 m^{2})	47,413 sq ft (4,405 m^{2})	125 ft (38 m)	1						
188	Operating	Orem Utah Temple	15.39 acres (62,281 m^{2})	71,998 sq ft (6,689 m^{2})		1	4		4			
189	Operating	Red Cliffs Utah Temple	15.31 acres (61,957 m^{2})	96,277 sq ft (8,944 m^{2})	230 ft (70 m)	1	4		6	neoclassical, desert modern		No
190	Operating	Urdaneta Philippines Temple	15.34 acres (62,079 m^{2})	32,604 sq ft (3,029 m^{2})		1	2		3			
191	Operating	Puebla Mexico Temple	6.81 acres (27,559 m^{2})	35,861 sq ft (3,332 m^{2})		1	4		3			
192	Operating	Taylorsville Utah Temple	7.5 acres (30,351 m^{2})	73,492 sq ft (6,828 m^{2})		1	4		4			
193	Operating	Cobán Guatemala Temple	2.1 acres (8,498 m^{2})	8,772 sq ft (815 m^{2})		1	1	stationary	1	Single attached end tower		
194	Operating	Salta Argentina Temple	17.72 acres (71,710 m^{2})	27,000 sq ft (2,508 m^{2})		1	2		2			
195	Operating	Layton Utah Temple	11.8 acres (47,753 m^{2})	93,539 sq ft (8,690 m^{2})								
196	Operating	Pittsburgh Pennsylvania Temple	5.8 acres (23,472 m^{2})	32,240 sq ft (2,995 m^{2})		1	2		2	Single attached central spire		
197	Operating	Mendoza Argentina Temple	15 acres (60,703 m^{2})	21,999 sq ft (2,044 m^{2})		1	2		2	Single attached central spire		
198	Operating	San Pedro Sula Honduras Temple	9 acres (36,422 m^{2})	35,818 sq ft (3,328 m^{2})		1	4		3			
199	Operating	Salvador Brazil Temple	4.6 acres (18,616 m^{2})	29,963 sq ft (2,784 m^{2})		1	2		2	Single attached central tower		
200	Operating	Deseret Peak Utah Temple	15.5 acres (62,726 m^{2})	71,998 sq ft (6,689 m^{2})		1	4		4	Single attached central tower		
201	Operating	Casper Wyoming Temple	9.52 acres (38,526 m^{2})	9,950 sq ft (924 m^{2})		1	1		1	Single attached central tower		
202	Operating	Tallahassee Florida Temple	4.97 acres (20,113 m^{2})	29,225 sq ft (2,715 m^{2})		1	2		2	Single attached central tower		
203	Operating	Auckland New Zealand Temple	11.37 acres (46,013 m^{2})	45,456 sq ft (4,223 m^{2})		1	4		3			
204	Operating	Nairobi Kenya Temple	3.435 acres (13,901 m^{2})	19,870 sq ft (1,846 m^{2})		1	2		2	Single attached end spire		
205	Operating	Abidjan Ivory Coast Temple	3.23 acres (13,071 m^{2})	17,362 sq ft (1,613 m^{2})		1						
206	Operating	Syracuse Utah Temple	12.268 acres (49,647 m^{2})	90,526 sq ft (8,410 m^{2})		2	4		4			
207	Operating	Antofagasta Chile Temple	2 acres (8,094 m^{2})	26,163 sq ft (2,431 m^{2})								
208	Operating	Farmington New Mexico Temple	6.63 acres (26,831 m^{2})	29,066 sq ft (2,700 m^{2})		1	2		2	Single attached central spire		
209	Operating	Elko Nevada Temple	5.2 acres (21,044 m^{2})	12,901 sq ft (1,199 m^{2})		1	1		1	Single attached central tower		
210	Operating	Grand Junction Colorado Temple	7.93 acres (32,092 m^{2})	29,630 sq ft (2,753 m^{2})		1	2		2	Single attached central spire		
211	Operating	Bahía Blanca Argentina Temple	8 acres (32,375 m^{2})	23,400 sq ft (2,174 m^{2})		1	2		2	Single attached tower		
212	Operating	Burley Idaho Temple	10.12 acres (40,954 m^{2})	45,300 sq ft (4,209 m^{2})		1	4		3	Single attached end spire		
213	Operating	Alabang Philippines Temple	2.62 acres (10,603 m^{2})	35,998 sq ft (3,344 m^{2})								
214	Operating	Harare Zimbabwe Temple	6.7 acres (27,114 m^{2})	17,250 sq ft (1,603 m^{2})		1	2		2	Single attached end spire		
215	Operating	Davao Philippines Temple	2.7 acres (10,927 m^{2})	18,450 sq ft (1,714 m^{2})								
216	Operating	Lindon Utah Temple	12.63 acres (51,112 m^{2})	83,140 sq ft (7,724 m^{2})		2	4		4			
217	Operating	Bacolod Philippines Temple	12.3 acres (49,776 m^{2})	27,895 sq ft (2,592 m^{2})		1	2		2	Single attached central tower		
219	Operating	Willamette Valley Oregon Temple	10.29 acres (41,642 m^{2})	30,635 sq ft (2,846 m^{2})		1	2		2	Single attached central spire		
218	Operating	Yorba Linda California Temple	5.46 acres (22,096 m^{2})	30,872 sq ft (2,868 m^{2})		1	2		2	Single attached end tower		
220	Operating	Belo Horizonte Brazil Temple	6.029 acres (24,398 m^{2})	28,686 sq ft (2,665 m^{2})		1	2		2	Single attached central tower with a pyramid roof		
221	Operating	Cleveland Ohio Temple	11.04 acres (44,677 m^{2})	9,950 sq ft (924 m^{2})		1	1	stationary	1			
222	Operating	Phnom Penh Cambodia Temple	3.2 acres (12,950 m^{2})	9,946 sq ft (924 m^{2})		1	1		1	Central spire surrounded by four smaller spires		
223	Operating	Ephraim Utah Temple	9.16 acres (37,069 m^{2})	41,680 sq ft (3,872 m^{2})		1	4		3	Two attached end towers		
224	Operating	Miraflores Guatemala City Guatemala Temple	1.5 acres (6,070 m^{2})	30,000 sq ft (2,787 m^{2})		1	2		2			
225	Operating	Montpelier Idaho Temple	2.6 acres (10,522 m^{2})	34,730 sq ft (3,227 m^{2})		1	2		2	Single attached central tower		
226	Operating	Managua Nicaragua Temple	8.9 acres (36,017 m^{2})	24,500 sq ft (2,276 m^{2})		1	2		2			
227	Operating	Cody Wyoming Temple	4.69 acres (18,980 m^{2})	9,950 sq ft (924 m^{2})		1	1	stationary	1	Single attached central tower		
228	Dedication scheduled	San Luis Potosí Mexico Temple	3.9 acres (15,783 m^{2})	9,300 sq ft (864 m^{2})		1	1	stationary	1			
229	Dedication scheduled	Wichita Kansas Temple	6.4 acres (25,900 m^{2})	9,950 sq ft (924 m^{2})		1	1	stationary	1			
230	Dedication scheduled	Torreón Mexico Temple	2.2 acres (8,903 m^{2})	11,324 sq ft (1,052 m^{2})		1	1	stationary	1			
231	Dedication scheduled	Modesto California Temple	17.63 acres (71,346 m^{2})	31,352 sq ft (2,913 m^{2})		1	2		2			
232	Dedication scheduled	Pago Pago American Samoa Temple	1.71 acres (6,920 m^{2})	17,000 sq ft (1,579 m^{2})		1	2		2	Single attached spire		
233	Dedication scheduled	Fort Worth Texas Temple	9.37 acres (37,919 m^{2})	30,000 sq ft (2,787 m^{2})		1	2		2			
234	Dedication scheduled	Knoxville Tennessee Temple	4.99 acres (20,194 m^{2})	30,000 sq ft (2,787 m^{2})		1	2		2	Single attached central tower		
235	Dedication scheduled	Smithfield Utah Temple	13.3 acres (53,823 m^{2})	83,000 sq ft (7,711 m^{2})		2	4		4			
236	Under construction	Bengaluru India Temple	1.62 acres (6,556 m^{2})	38,670 sq ft (3,593 m^{2})						Central spire surrounded by four smaller spires		
237	Under construction	Neiafu Tonga Temple	4.81 acres (19,465 m^{2})	17,000 sq ft (1,579 m^{2})	75 ft (23 m)	1	2		2	Single attached spire		
238	Under construction	Freetown Sierra Leone Temple	2.9 acres (11,736 m^{2})	18,000 sq ft (1,672 m^{2})		1	2		2	Single attached central tower		
239	Under construction	Lubumbashi Democratic Republic of the Congo Temple	2.57 acres (10,400 m^{2})	19,300 sq ft (1,793 m^{2})		1	2		2	Single attached spire		
240	Under construction	Heber Valley Utah Temple	17.9 acres (72,439 m^{2})	88,000 sq ft (8,175 m^{2})		1	4		4	Two attached end towers		
241	Under construction	Querétaro Mexico Temple	3.58 acres (14,488 m^{2})	27,500 sq ft (2,555 m^{2})		1	2		2	Single attached central tower		
242	Under construction	Port Vila Vanuatu Temple	1.62 acres (6,556 m^{2})	10,000 sq ft (929 m^{2})		1	1	stationary	1	Single attached end spire		
243	Under construction	Port Moresby Papua New Guinea Temple	4.45 acres (18,009 m^{2})	9,550 sq ft (887 m^{2})		1	1	stationary	1	Single attached end spire		
244	Under construction	Kaohsiung Taiwan Temple	1.26 acres (5,099 m^{2})	10,900 sq ft (1,013 m^{2})		1	1	stationary	1	Single attached central spire		
245	Under construction	Teton River Idaho Temple	16.6 acres (67,178 m^{2})	100,000 sq ft (9,290 m^{2})								
246	Under construction	Santa Cruz Bolivia Temple	5.24 acres (21,206 m^{2})	29,000 sq ft (2,694 m^{2})		1	2		2			
247	Under construction	Ribeirão Preto Brazil Temple	8.77 acres (35,491 m^{2})	32,000 sq ft (2,973 m^{2})								
248	Under construction	Londrina Brazil Temple	6.23 acres (25,212 m^{2})	32,000 sq ft (2,973 m^{2})								
249	Under construction	Santiago West Chile Temple	2.4 acres (9,712 m^{2})	12,500 sq ft (1,161 m^{2})								
250	Under construction	Austin Texas Temple	10.6 acres (42,897 m^{2})	30,000 sq ft (2,787 m^{2})		1	2		2			
251	Under construction	Cagayan de Oro Philippines Temple	4.9 acres (19,830 m^{2})	18,449 sq ft (1,714 m^{2})								
252	Under construction	Tarawa Kiribati Temple	0.8 acres (3,237 m^{2})	10,000 sq ft (929 m^{2})		1	1	stationary	1	Single attached end spire		
253	Under construction	Grand Rapids Michigan Temple	10.32 acres (41,764 m^{2})	20,123 sq ft (1,869 m^{2})		1	2		2			
254	Under construction	Tacloban City Philippines Temple	6.99 acres (28,288 m^{2})	21,407 sq ft (1,989 m^{2})								
255	Under construction	Cali Colombia Temple	3.14 acres (12,707 m^{2})	9,500 sq ft (883 m^{2})		1	1	stationary	1	Single attached central tower		
256	Under construction	Antananarivo Madagascar Temple	9.8 acres (39,659 m^{2})	10,000 sq ft (929 m^{2})								
257	Under construction	Birmingham England Temple	2.7 acres (10,927 m^{2})	10,800 sq ft (1,003 m^{2})								
258	Under construction	Lethbridge Alberta Temple	9 acres (36,422 m^{2})	45,000 sq ft (4,181 m^{2})								
259	Under construction	Lagos Nigeria Temple	2.7 acres (10,927 m^{2})	19,800 sq ft (1,839 m^{2})		1	2		2			
260	Under construction	Natal Brazil Temple	5.53 acres (22,379 m^{2})	19,800 sq ft (1,839 m^{2})								
261	Under construction	Benin City Nigeria Temple	2.17 acres (8,782 m^{2})	30,700 sq ft (2,852 m^{2})		1	2		2			
262	Under construction	Budapest Hungary Temple	5.92 acres (23,957 m^{2})	18,000 sq ft (1,672 m^{2})								
263	Under construction	Singapore Temple	1 acre (4,047 m^{2})	18,000 sq ft (1,672 m^{2})						Single attached central tower with a pyramid-style roof		
264	Under construction	Wellington New Zealand Temple	3.35 acres (13,557 m^{2})	14,900 sq ft (1,384 m^{2})								
265	Under construction	Winchester Virginia Temple	11.27 acres (45,608 m^{2})	30,000 sq ft (2,787 m^{2})								
266	Under construction	Brazzaville Republic of the Congo Temple	1.5 acres (6,070 m^{2})	10,000 sq ft (929 m^{2})								
267	Under construction	Tampa Florida Temple	12 acres (48,562 m^{2})	29,000 sq ft (2,694 m^{2})		1	2		2	Single attached central tower		
268	Under construction	Vancouver Washington Temple	15.11 acres (61,148 m^{2})	43,000 sq ft (3,995 m^{2})								
269	Under construction	Lone Mountain Nevada Temple	19.8 acres (80,128 m^{2})	70,194 sq ft (6,521 m^{2})	196 ft (60 m)							
270	Under construction	Fairbanks Alaska Temple	7.59 acres (30,716 m^{2})	10,000 sq ft (929 m^{2})								
271	Under construction	Kumasi Ghana Temple	2.08 acres (8,417 m^{2})	22,750 sq ft (2,114 m^{2})								
272	Under construction	Cape Town South Africa Temple	3.79 acres (15,338 m^{2})	9,500 sq ft (883 m^{2})		1	1	stationary	1	Single attached central tower		
273	Under construction	Brussels Belgium Temple	0.3 acres (1,214 m^{2})	25,500 sq ft (2,369 m^{2})								
274	Under construction	Jacksonville Florida Temple	6.6 acres (26,709 m^{2})	29,000 sq ft (2,694 m^{2})								
275	Under construction	João Pessoa Brazil Temple	3.9 acres (15,783 m^{2})	18,850 sq ft (1,751 m^{2})								
276	Under construction	Fairview Texas Temple	8.16 acres (33,022 m^{2})	30,742 sq ft (2,856 m^{2})	120 ft (37 m)	1	2	stationary	2			
277	Under construction	Huehuetenango Guatemala Temple	3.4 acres (13,759 m^{2})	10,787 sq ft (1,002 m^{2})		1	1	stationary	1			
278	Under construction	Teresina Brazil Temple	3.6 acres (14,569 m^{2})	25,420 sq ft (2,362 m^{2})								
279	Under construction	Springfield Missouri Temple	38 acres (153,781 m^{2})	29,000 sq ft (2,694 m^{2})								
280	Under construction	Missoula Montana Temple	5.08 acres (20,558 m^{2})	19,000 sq ft (1,765 m^{2})								
281	Under construction	Santos Brazil Temple	1.1 acres (4,452 m^{2})	23,000 sq ft (2,137 m^{2})								
282	Under construction	Naga Philippines Temple	9.11 acres (36,867 m^{2})	18,850 sq ft (1,751 m^{2})								
283	Under construction	Huntsville Alabama Temple	10.97 acres (44,394 m^{2})	22,681 sq ft (2,107 m^{2})								
284	Under construction	Tulsa Oklahoma Temple	25.7 acres (104,004 m^{2})	29,600 sq ft (2,750 m^{2})								
285	Under construction	Victoria British Columbia Temple	4.7 acres (19,020 m^{2})	11,400 sq ft (1,059 m^{2})								
286	Under construction	Coeur d'Alene Idaho Temple	10.91 acres (44,151 m^{2})	29,630 sq ft (2,753 m^{2})								
287	Under construction	Colorado Springs Colorado Temple	18.6 acres (75,272 m^{2})	45,000 sq ft (4,181 m^{2})								
288	Under construction	Barcelona Spain Temple	5.4 acres (21,853 m^{2})	27,500 sq ft (2,555 m^{2})		1	2		2			
289	Under construction	Iquitos Peru Temple	1.75 acres (7,082 m^{2})	20,000 sq ft (1,858 m^{2})								
290	Under construction	Maceió Brazil Temple	3 acres (12,141 m^{2})	19,000 sq ft (1,765 m^{2})								
291	Under construction	Vienna Austria Temple	0.8 acres (3,237 m^{2})	15,300 sq ft (1,421 m^{2})								
292	Groundbreaking scheduled	Cincinnati Ohio Temple	35 acres (141,640 m^{2})	29,630 sq ft (2,753 m^{2})								
293	Groundbreaking scheduled	Piura Peru Temple	2.6 acres (10,522 m^{2})	18,850 sq ft (1,751 m^{2})								
294	Groundbreaking scheduled	Cuernavaca Mexico Temple	5.36 acres (21,691 m^{2})	19,000 sq ft (1,765 m^{2})								
295	Groundbreaking scheduled	La Paz Bolivia Temple	3.8 acres (15,378 m^{2})	18,850 sq ft (1,751 m^{2})								
296	Groundbreaking scheduled	Eket Nigeria Temple	7 acres (28,328 m^{2})	18,850 sq ft (1,751 m^{2})								
297	Groundbreaking scheduled	Calabar Nigeria Temple	7 acres (28,328 m^{2})	26,000 sq ft (2,415 m^{2})								
298	Groundbreaking scheduled	Viña del Mar Chile Temple	1.87 acres (7,568 m^{2})	30,000 sq ft (2,787 m^{2})								
299	Groundbreaking scheduled	Lehi Utah Temple	22.48 acres (90,973 m^{2})	85,000 sq ft (7,897 m^{2})								
300	Announced	Russia Temple										
301	Announced	Dubai United Arab Emirates Temple										
302	Announced	Shanghai People's Republic of China Temple										
303	Site announced	São Paulo East Brazil Temple	10.7 acres (43,301 m^{2})	46,050 sq ft (4,278 m^{2})								
304	Site announced	Oslo Norway Temple	8 acres (32,375 m^{2})	10,800 sq ft (1,003 m^{2})		1	1	stationary	1	Single attached central spire		
305	Site announced	Beira Mozambique Temple	2.5 acres (10,117 m^{2})	10,000 sq ft (929 m^{2})								
306	Announced	Monrovia Liberia Temple										
307	Site announced	Kananga Democratic Republic of the Congo Temple	1.6 acres (6,475 m^{2})	11,000 sq ft (1,022 m^{2})								
308	Site announced	Culiacán Mexico Temple	5 acres (20,234 m^{2})	10,000 sq ft (929 m^{2})								
309	Site announced	Vitória Brazil Temple	0.75 acres (3,035 m^{2})	10,600 sq ft (985 m^{2})		1	1	stationary	1			
310	Site announced	Cusco Peru Temple	2.48 acres (10,036 m^{2})	9,950 sq ft (924 m^{2})								
311	Site announced	Mexico City Benemérito Mexico Temple	8.5 acres (34,398 m^{2})	29,000 sq ft (2,694 m^{2})								
312	Announced	Busan Korea Temple										
313	Site announced	Santiago Philippines Temple	14.47 acres (58,558 m^{2})	18,850 sq ft (1,751 m^{2})								
314	Announced	Chiclayo Peru Temple										
315	Site announced	Buenos Aires City Center Argentina Temple	1.56 acres (6,313 m^{2})									
316	Site announced	Tacoma Washington Temple	11.6 acres (46,944 m^{2})	45,000 sq ft (4,181 m^{2})								
317	Announced	Pachuca Mexico Temple										
318	Site announced	Toluca Mexico Temple	4.87 acres (19,708 m^{2})	19,000 sq ft (1,765 m^{2})								
319	Announced	Tula Mexico Temple										
320	Site announced	Retalhuleu Guatemala Temple	5.51 acres (22,298 m^{2})									
321	Site announced	Tuguegarao City Philippines Temple	6.3 acres (25,495 m^{2})	18,850 sq ft (1,751 m^{2})								
322	Site announced	Iloilo Philippines Temple	7.7 acres (31,161 m^{2})	18,850 sq ft (1,751 m^{2})								
323	Site announced	Jakarta Indonesia Temple	1.5 acres (6,070 m^{2})	50,000 sq ft (4,645 m^{2})								
324	Site announced	Hamburg Germany Temple	1.4 acres (5,666 m^{2})									
325	Site announced	Sunnyvale California Temple	4.73 acres (19,142 m^{2})	30,000 sq ft (2,787 m^{2})		1	2		2			
326	Site announced	Bakersfield California Temple	13.07 acres (52,892 m^{2})	30,000 sq ft (2,787 m^{2})		1	2		2			
327	Site announced	Charlotte North Carolina Temple	7.7 acres (31,161 m^{2})	37,000 sq ft (3,437 m^{2})								
328	Site announced	Harrisburg Pennsylvania Temple	5.36 acres (21,691 m^{2})	20,000 sq ft (1,858 m^{2})								
329	Site announced	Savai'i Samoa Temple	4.6 acres (18,616 m^{2})	29,630 sq ft (2,753 m^{2})								
330	Announced	Cancún Mexico Temple										
331	Announced	Huancayo Peru Temple										
332	Site announced	Goiânia Brazil Temple	5.54 acres (22,420 m^{2})	18,850 sq ft (1,751 m^{2})								
333	Announced	Cape Coast Ghana Temple										
334	Announced	Luanda Angola Temple										
335	Announced	Mbuji-Mayi Democratic Republic of the Congo Temple										
336	Announced	Laoag Philippines Temple										
337	Site announced	Osaka Japan Temple	10 acres (40,469 m^{2})	34,320 sq ft (3,188 m^{2})								
338	Site announced	Kahului Hawaii Temple	7.6 acres (30,756 m^{2})	19,000 sq ft (1,765 m^{2})								
339	Announced	Roanoke Virginia Temple										
340	Site announced	Ulaanbaatar Mongolia Temple	11 acres (44,515 m^{2})	18,850 sq ft (1,751 m^{2})								
341	Announced	Uturoa French Polynesia Temple										
342	Site announced	Chihuahua Mexico Temple	5.87 acres (23,755 m^{2})	19,000 sq ft (1,765 m^{2})								
343	Site announced	Florianópolis Brazil Temple	5.5 acres (22,258 m^{2})									
344	Site announced	Rosario Argentina Temple	1.59 acres (6,435 m^{2})									
345	Announced	Edinburgh Scotland Temple										
346	Announced	Brisbane Australia South Temple										
347	Site announced	Yuma Arizona Temple	7 acres (28,328 m^{2})	18,500 sq ft (1,719 m^{2})								
348	Site announced	Fort Bend Texas Temple	15.7 acres (63,536 m^{2})	46,000 sq ft (4,274 m^{2})								
349	Site announced	Des Moines Iowa Temple	19.576 acres (79,221 m^{2})	18,850 sq ft (1,751 m^{2})								
350	Announced	Honolulu Hawaii Temple										
351	Site announced	West Jordan Utah Temple	16.1 acres (65,154 m^{2})	85,000 sq ft (7,897 m^{2})								
352	Announced	Maracaibo Venezuela Temple										
353	Announced	Juchitan de Zaragoza Mexico Temple										
354	Announced	Santa Ana El Salvador Temple										
355	Site announced	Medellín Colombia Temple	3.05 acres (12,343 m^{2})	10,741 sq ft (998 m^{2})								
356	Announced	Santiago Dominican Republic Temple										
357	Site announced	Puerto Montt Chile Temple	5.8 acres (23,472 m^{2})	18,500 sq ft (1,719 m^{2})								
358	Announced	Dublin Ireland Temple										
359	Announced	Milan Italy Temple										
360	Announced	Abuja Nigeria Temple										
361	Announced	Kampala Uganda Temple										
362	Announced	Maputo Mozambique Temple										
363	Site announced	Queen Creek Arizona Temple	15.5 acres (62,726 m^{2})	82,000 sq ft (7,618 m^{2})								
364	Site announced	El Paso Texas Temple	6.4 acres (25,900 m^{2})	22,300 sq ft (2,072 m^{2})								
365	Announced	Milwaukee Wisconsin Temple										
366	Announced	Summit New Jersey Temple										
367	Announced	Price Utah Temple										
368	Announced	Reynosa Mexico Temple										
369	Announced	Chorrillos Peru Temple										
370	Announced	Rivera Uruguay Temple										
371	Site announced	Campo Grande Brazil Temple	5.6 acres (22,662 m^{2})	11,300 sq ft (1,050 m^{2})								
372	Announced	Porto Portugal Temple										
373	Announced	Uyo Nigeria Temple										
374	Announced	San Jose del Monte Philippines Temple										
375	Announced	Nouméa New Caledonia Temple										
376	Announced	Liverpool Australia Temple										
377	Site announced	Caldwell Idaho Temple	19.2 acres (77,700 m^{2})	82,000 sq ft (7,618 m^{2})								
378	Site announced	Flagstaff Arizona Temple	7.6 acres (30,756 m^{2})	19,000 sq ft (1,765 m^{2})								
379	Site announced	Rapid City South Dakota Temple	4.86 acres (19,668 m^{2})	11,800 sq ft (1,096 m^{2})								
378	Site announced	Greenville South Carolina Temple	8.8 acres (35,612 m^{2})	18,850 sq ft (1,751 m^{2})								
381	Site announced	Norfolk Virginia Temple	23 acres (93,078 m^{2})	18,650 sq ft (1,733 m^{2})								
382	Site announced	Spanish Fork Utah Temple	8.7 acres (35,208 m^{2})	80,000 sq ft (7,432 m^{2})								
383	Announced	Portland Maine Temple										
384	Announced	Marysville Washington Temple										
385	Site announced	Otavalo Ecuador Temple	6.05 acres (24,483 m^{2})	18,850 sq ft (1,751 m^{2})								

=== Announcement, Groundbreaking, and Dedication ===
The following table is a comparison table listing significant initial milestones for each temple. The person officiating in each milestone is also listed.

#	Status	Name	Announcement		Groundbreaking		Open House	Dedication		President
#	Status	Name	date	by	date	by	Open House	date	by	President
1	Operating	St. George Utah Temple	January 31, 1871	Brigham Young	November 9, 1871	Brigham Young		April 6, 1877	Daniel H. Wells	
2	Operating	Logan Utah Temple	October 6, 1876	Brigham Young	May 17, 1877	John Willard Young		May 17, 1884	John Taylor	Jeffrey R. Burbank
3	Operating	Manti Utah Temple	June 25, 1875	Brigham Young	April 25, 1877	Brigham Young		May 21, 1888	Lorenzo Snow	
4	Closed for renovation	Salt Lake Temple	28 July 1847	Brigham Young	14 February 1853	Brigham Young	5 April 1893	6 April 1893	Wilford Woodruff	
5	Operating	Laie Hawaii Temple	October 1, 1915	Joseph F. Smith	June 1, 1915	Joseph F. Smith	May 2–27, 1978	November 27, 1919	Heber J. Grant	
6	Operating	Cardston Alberta Temple	27 June 1913	Joseph F. Smith	13 November 1913	Daniel Kent Greene	Tours offered, 1920–23	26 August 1923	Heber J. Grant	John D. Bridge
7	Operating	Mesa Arizona Temple	October 3, 1919	Heber J. Grant	April 25, 1922	Heber J. Grant	Tours were available upon request 1920–22	October 23, 1927	Heber J. Grant	
8	Operating	Idaho Falls Idaho Temple	March 3, 1937	Heber J. Grant	December 19, 1939	David Asael Smith	September 15–20, 1945	September 23, 1945	George Albert Smith	Kevin D. McCracken
9	Operating	Bern Switzerland Temple	1 July 1952	David O. McKay	5 August 1953	David O. McKay	9–10 September 1955	11 September 1955	David O. McKay	Martin Andreas Müller
10	Operating	Los Angeles California Temple	March 6, 1937	Heber J. Grant	September 22, 1951	David O. McKay	December 19, 1955 – February 18, 1956	March 11, 1956	David O. McKay	
11	Operating	Hamilton New Zealand Temple	17 February 1955	David O. McKay	21 December 1955	Ariel Ballif, Wendell B. Mendenhall, and George R. Biesinger	28 March – 19 April 1958	20 April 1958	David O. McKay	Tony Paul Osborne
12	Operating	London England Temple	17 February 1955	David O. McKay	27 August 1955	David O. McKay	16 August – 3 September 1958	7 September 1958	David O. McKay	Julian Jones
13	Operating	Oakland California Temple	January 23, 1961	David O. McKay	May 26, 1962	David O. McKay	October 5–31, 1964	November 17, 1964	David O. McKay	John C. Hodgman
14	Operating	Ogden Utah Temple	August 24, 1967	David O. McKay	September 8, 1969	Hugh B. Brown	December 16–30, 1971 (original)	January 18, 1972	Joseph Fielding Smith	
15	Closed for renovation	Provo Utah Temple	August 14, 1967	David O. McKay	September 15, 1969	Hugh B. Brown	January 10–29, 1972	February 9, 1972	Joseph Fielding Smith	
16	Operating	Washington D.C. Temple	November 15, 1968	David O. McKay	December 7, 1968	Hugh B. Brown	September 17 – November 2, 1974	November 19, 1974	Spencer W. Kimball	Peter K. Christensen
17	Operating	São Paulo Brazil Temple	1 March 1975	Spencer W. Kimball	20 March 1976	James E. Faust	1-30 September 1978	30 October 1978	Spencer W. Kimball	Reinaldo Barreto
18	Operating	Tokyo Japan Temple	9 August 1975	Spencer W. Kimball	10 April 1978		15 September – 18 October 1980	27 October 1980	Spencer W. Kimball	Masamichi Kudo
19	Operating	Seattle Washington Temple	November 15, 1975	Spencer W. Kimball	May 27, 1978	Marion G. Romney	October 7 – November 8, 1980	November 17, 1980	Spencer W. Kimball	
20	Operating	Jordan River Utah Temple	February 3, 1978	Spencer W. Kimball	June 9, 1979	Spencer W. Kimball	September 29 – October 31, 1981 (original)	November 16, 1981	Marion G. Romney	
21	Operating	Atlanta Georgia Temple	April 2, 1980	Spencer W. Kimball	March 7, 1981	Spencer W. Kimball	May 3–21, 1983	June 1, 1983	Gordon B. Hinckley	Marion Keith Giddens (2024)
22	Operating	Apia Samoa Temple	15 October 1977	Spencer W. Kimball	19 October 1981	Dennis E. Simmons	19–30 July 1983	5 August 1983	Gordon B. Hinckley	Uele Va’aulu
23	Operating	Nuku'alofa Tonga Temple	2 April 1980	Spencer W. Kimball	18 February 1981	Spencer W. Kimball	19–30 July 1983	9 August 1983	Gordon B. Hinckley	Sione Tatafu Angakehe Tafuna
24	Operating	Santiago Chile Temple	2 April 1980	Spencer W. Kimball	30 May 1981	Spencer W. Kimball	24 August – 8 September 1983	15 September 1983	Gordon B. Hinckley	Simon Barrera
25	Operating	Papeete Tahiti Temple	2 April 1980	Spencer W. Kimball	13 February 1981	Spencer W. Kimball	13–22 October 1983	27 October 1983	Gordon B. Hinckley	Benjamin T. Sinjoux
26	Operating	Mexico City Mexico Temple	3 April 1976	Spencer W. Kimball	25 November 1979	Boyd K. Packer	9–19 November 1983	2 December 1983	Gordon B. Hinckley	Alberto De La O Gamboa
27	Operating	Boise Idaho Temple	March 31, 1982	Spencer W. Kimball	December 18, 1982	Mark E. Petersen	May 1–19, 1984	May 25, 1984	Gordon B. Hinckley	Brian Zarkou
28	Operating	Sydney Australia Temple	2 April 1980	Spencer W. Kimball	13 August 1982	Bruce R. McConkie	6–18 September 1984	20 September 1984	Gordon B. Hinckley	Joseph Saikaly
29	Operating	Manila Philippines Temple	1 April 1981	Spencer W. Kimball	25 August 1982	Gordon B. Hinckley	3–15 September 1984	25 September 1984	Gordon B. Hinckley	Edgardo Enriquez Fernando
30	Operating	Dallas Texas Temple	April 1, 1981	Spencer W. Kimball	January 22, 1983	Gordon B. Hinckley	September 7–26, 1984	October 19, 1984	Gordon B. Hinckley	Stuart Alleman
31	Operating	Taipei Taiwan Temple	31 March 1982	Spencer W. Kimball	27 August 1982	Gordon B. Hinckley	30 October – 10 November 1984	17 November 1984	Gordon B. Hinckley	Tsai, Wen Fang
32	Operating	Guatemala City Guatemala Temple	1 April 1981	Spencer W. Kimball	12 September 1982	Richard G. Scott	27 November – 10 December 1984	14 December 1984	Gordon B. Hinckley	Hugo Valenzuela Ovando
33	Operating	Freiberg Germany Temple	9 October 1982	Spencer W. Kimball	23 April 1983	Thomas S. Monson	3–15 June 1985	29 June 1985	Gordon B. Hinckley	Holger Rakow
34	Closed for renovation	Stockholm Sweden Temple	1 April 1981	Spencer W. Kimball	17 March 1984	Thomas S. Monson	10–22 June 1985	2 July 1985	Gordon B. Hinckley	
35	Operating	Chicago Illinois Temple	April 1, 1981	Spencer W. Kimball	August 13, 1983	Gordon B. Hinckley	July 15 – August 3, 1985	August 9, 1985	Gordon B. Hinckley	Richard DeVries
36	Operating	Johannesburg South Africa Temple	1 April 1981	Spencer W. Kimball	27 November 1982	Marvin J. Ashton	20 July – 10 August 1985	24 August 1985	Gordon B. Hinckley	Howard N. Kingsley
37	Operating	Seoul Korea Temple	1 April 1981	Spencer W. Kimball	9 May 1983	Marvin J. Ashton	26 November 26 – 7 December 1985	14 December 1985	Gordon B. Hinckley	Taegul Kim
38	Operating	Lima Peru Temple	1 April 1981	Spencer W. Kimball	11 September 1982	Boyd K. Packer	11–28 December 1985	10 January 1986	Gordon B. Hinckley	Gino Galli
39	Operating	Buenos Aires Argentina Temple	2 April 1980	Spencer W. Kimball	20 April 1983	Bruce R. McConkie	17–24 December 1985	17 January 1986	Thomas S. Monson	Fernando D. Ortega
40	Operating	Denver Colorado Temple	March 31, 1982	Spencer W. Kimball	May 19, 1984	Gordon B. Hinckley	September 8–27, 1986	October 24, 1986	Ezra Taft Benson	Allen L. Paulsen
41	Operating	Frankfurt Germany Temple	1 April 1981	Spencer W. Kimball	1 July 1985	Gordon B. Hinckley	29 July 29 – 8 August 1987	28 August 1987	Ezra Taft Benson	K. Günter Borcherding
42	Operating	Portland Oregon Temple	April 7, 1984	Spencer W. Kimball	September 20, 1986	Gordon B. Hinckley	June 15 – July 8, 1989	August 19, 1989	Gordon B. Hinckley	
43	Operating	Las Vegas Nevada Temple	April 7, 1984	Spencer W. Kimball	November 30, 1985	Gordon B. Hinckley	November 16 – December 9, 1989	December 16, 1989	Gordon B. Hinckley	
44	Operating	Toronto Ontario Temple	7 April 1984	Spencer W. Kimball	10 October 1987	Thomas S. Monson	2–18 August 1990	25 August 1990	Gordon B. Hinckley	Bradley Albert Thompson
45	Operating	San Diego California Temple	7 April 1984	Gordon B. Hinckley	27 February 1988	Ezra Taft Benson	20 February–3 April 1993	25 April 1993	Gordon B. Hinckley	Richard G. Whittier (2026-present)
46	Closed for renovation	Orlando Florida Temple	April 6, 1991	Ezra Taft Benson	June 20, 1992	James E. Faust	September 10–30, 1994	October 9, 1994	Howard W. Hunter	Boyd P. Hoglund
47	Operating	Bountiful Utah Temple	April 6, 1991	Ezra Taft Benson	May 2, 1992	Ezra Taft Benson	November 4 – December 17, 1994	January 8, 1995	Howard W. Hunter	Melvyn K. Reeves
48	Operating	Hong Kong China Temple	3 October 1992	Ezra Taft Benson	22 January 1994	John K. Carmack	7–21 May 1996	26 May 1996	Gordon B. Hinckley	Chi Yin Lo
49	Operating	Mount Timpanogos Utah Temple	October 3, 1992	Ezra Taft Benson	October 9, 1993	Gordon B. Hinckley	August 6 – September 21, 1996	October 13, 1996	Gordon B. Hinckley	
50	Operating	St. Louis Missouri Temple	December 29, 1990	Ezra Taft Benson	October 30, 1993	Gordon B. Hinckley	April 26 – May 24, 1997	June 1, 1997	Gordon B. Hinckley	Robert W. Jones
51	Operating	Vernal Utah Temple	February 13, 1994	Ezra Taft Benson	May 13, 1995	Gordon B. Hinckley	October 11–25, 1997	November 2, 1997	Gordon B. Hinckley	
52	Operating	Preston England Temple	19 October 1992	Ezra Taft Benson	12 June 1994	Gordon B. Hinckley	16–30 May 1998	7 June 1998	Gordon B. Hinckley	Michael Wayne Gilmore
53	Operating	Monticello Utah Temple	October 4, 1997	Gordon B. Hinckley	November 17, 1997	Ben B. Banks	July 16–18, 1998	July 26, 1998	Gordon B. Hinckley	
54	Operating	Anchorage Alaska Temple	October 4, 1997	Gordon B. Hinckley	April 17, 1998	F. Melvin Hammond	December 29–31, 1998	January 9, 1999	Gordon B. Hinckley	Rodney D. Metcalf
55	Operating	Colonia Juárez Chihuahua Mexico Temple	4 October 1997	Gordon B. Hinckley	7 March 1998	Eran A. Call	25–27 February 1999	6 March 1999	Gordon B. Hinckley	Walter Johnson
56	Operating	Madrid Spain Temple	4 April 1993	Ezra Taft Benson	11 June 1996	Gordon B. Hinckley	20 February – 13 March 1999	19 March 1999	Gordon B. Hinckley	Rafael Muñoz Campos
57	Operating	Bogotá Colombia Temple	7 April 1984	Spencer W. Kimball	26 June 1993	William R. Bradford	27 March – 18 April 1999	24 April 1999	Gordon B. Hinckley	Edgar Agen Mantilla Vargas
58	Operating	Guayaquil Ecuador Temple	31 March 1982	Spencer W. Kimball	10 August 1996	Richard G. Scott	23 June – 5 July 1999	1 August 1999	Gordon B. Hinckley	Byron Wladimir Manzo Castillo
59	Operating	Spokane Washington Temple	August 13, 1998	Gordon B. Hinckley	October 10, 1998	F. Melvin Hammond	August 6–14, 1999	August 21, 1999	Gordon B. Hinckley	
60	Operating	Columbus Ohio Temple	April 25, 1998	Gordon B. Hinckley	September 12, 1998	John K. Carmack	August 21–28, 1999	September 4, 1999	Gordon B. Hinckley	George E. Mitchell
61	Temporarily closed	Bismarck North Dakota Temple	July 29, 1998	Gordon B. Hinckley	October 17, 1998	Kenneth Johnson	September 10–11, 1999	September 19, 1999	Gordon B. Hinckley	Jerry L Parker
62	Operating	Columbia South Carolina Temple	September 11, 1998	Gordon B. Hinckley	December 5, 1998	Gordon T. Watts	September 30 – October 9, 1999	October 16, 1999	Gordon B. Hinckley	Timothy B. Guffey
63	Operating	Detroit Michigan Temple	August 10, 1998	Gordon B. Hinckley	October 10, 1998	Jay E. Jensen	October 8–16, 1999	October 23, 1999	Gordon B. Hinckley	David Peter Jensen
64	Operating	Halifax Nova Scotia Temple	7 May 1998	Gordon B. Hinckley	12 October 1998	Jay E. Jensen	4–7 November 1999	14 November 1999	Gordon B. Hinckley	George Colin Pattison
65	Operating	Regina Saskatchewan Temple	3 August 1998	Gordon B. Hinckley	14 November 1998	Hugh W. Pinnock	5–6 November 1999	14 November 1999	Boyd K. Packer	Doug Robertson
66	Operating	Billings Montana Temple	August 30, 1996	Gordon B. Hinckley	March 30, 1998	Hugh W. Pinnock	October 8–23, 1999	November 20, 1999	Gordon B. Hinckley	Bradley R. Wilde
67	Operating	Edmonton Alberta Temple	11 August 1998	Gordon B. Hinckley	27 February 1999	Yoshihiko Kikuchi	3–7 December 1999	11 December 1999	Gordon B. Hinckley	David Clarence McCue
68	Operating	Raleigh North Carolina Temple	September 3, 1998	Gordon B. Hinckley	February 6, 1999	Loren C. Dunn	December 3–11, 1999	December 18, 1999	Gordon B. Hinckley	Enos Tracy
69	Operating	St. Paul Minnesota Temple	July 29, 1998	Gordon B. Hinckley	September 26, 1998	Hugh W. Pinnock	December 18–31, 1999	January 9, 2000	Gordon B. Hinckley	Terrance Lee Sullivan
70	Closed for renovation	Kona Hawaii Temple	May 7, 1998	Gordon B. Hinckley	March 13, 1999	John B. Dickson	January 12–15, 2000	January 23, 2000	Gordon B. Hinckley	Edward Lincoln Reinhardt
71	Operating	Ciudad Juárez Mexico Temple	7 May 1998	Gordon B. Hinckley	9 January 1999	Eran A. Call	12–19 February 2000	26 February 2000	Gordon B. Hinckley	William S. Johns
72	Operating	Hermosillo Sonora Mexico Temple	20 July 1998	Gordon B. Hinckley	5 December 1998	Eran A. Call	15–19 February 2000	27 February 2000	Gordon B. Hinckley	Alfredo Zanudo Urrea
73	Operating	Albuquerque New Mexico Temple	April 4, 1997	Gordon B. Hinckley	June 20, 1998	Lynn A. Mickelsen	February 17–26, 2000	March 5, 2000	Gordon B. Hinckley	Ben M. Allen
74	Operating	Oaxaca Mexico Temple	3 February 1999	Gordon B. Hinckley	13 March 1999	Carl B. Pratt	28 February – 4 March 2000	11 March 2000	James E. Faust	Adán Serrano Guzmán
75	Operating	Tuxtla Gutiérrez Mexico Temple	25 February 1999	Gordon B. Hinckley	20 March 1999	Richard E. Turley Sr.	29 February – 4 March 2000	12 March 2000	James E. Faust	Indalecio Tomas Morales
76	Operating	Louisville Kentucky Temple	March 17, 1999	Gordon B. Hinckley	May 29, 1999	John K. Carmack	March 4–11, 2000	March 19, 2000	Thomas S. Monson	Ronald Lynn Spjut
77	Operating	Palmyra New York Temple	February 21, 1999	Gordon B. Hinckley	May 25, 1999	Gordon B. Hinckley	March 25 – April 1, 2000	April 6, 2000	Gordon B. Hinckley	Daniel Kimbler
78	Operating	Fresno California Temple	January 8, 1999	Gordon B. Hinckley	March 20, 1999	John B. Dickson	March 25 – April 4, 2000	April 9, 2000	Gordon B. Hinckley	Cliff Keith Woolley
79	Operating	Medford Oregon Temple	March 15, 1999	Gordon B. Hinckley	May 20, 1999	D. Lee Tobler	March 24–31, 2000	April 16, 2000	James E. Faust	Kelly E Thompson
80	Operating	Memphis Tennessee Temple	September 17, 1998	Gordon B. Hinckley	January 16, 1999	Gordon T. Watts	April 8–15, 2000	April 23, 2000	James E. Faust	David Mark Lewis
81	Operating	Reno Nevada Temple	April 12, 1999	Gordon B. Hinckley	July 24, 1999	Rex D. Pinegar	April 8–15, 2000	April 23, 2000	Thomas S. Monson	David Asa Haws
82	Operating	Cochabamba Bolivia Temple	13 January 1995	Gordon B. Hinckley	10 November 1996	Gordon B. Hinckley	18–22 April 2000	30 April 2000	Gordon B. Hinckley	Rene Juan Cabrera Balanza
83	Operating	Tampico Mexico Temple	8 July 1998	Gordon B. Hinckley	28 November 1998	Eran A. Call	29 April – 6 May 2000	20 May 2000	Thomas S. Monson	Victor Esparza Villasana
84	Operating	Nashville Tennessee Temple	November 9, 1994	Howard W. Hunter	March 13, 1999	John K. Carmack	May 6–13, 2000	May 21, 2000	James E. Faust	Robert Davis Dennis
85	Operating	Villahermosa Mexico Temple	30 October 1998	Gordon B. Hinckley	9 January 1999	Richard E. Turley Sr.	9–13 May 2000	21 May 2000	Thomas S. Monson	Fernando Chiu Jiménez
86	Operating	Montreal Quebec Temple	6 August 1998	Gordon B. Hinckley	9 April 1999	Gary J. Coleman	20–27 May 2000	4 June 2000	Gordon B. Hinckley	Sterling Dietze
87	Operating	San José Costa Rica Temple	17 March 1999	Gordon B. Hinckley	24 April 1999	Lynn G. Robbins	20–27 May 2000	4 June 2000	James E. Faust	Enrique Alberto Flores Garcia
88	Operating	Fukuoka Japan Temple	7 May 1998	Gordon B. Hinckley	20 March 1999	L. Lionel Kendrick	1–3 June 2000	11 June 2000	Gordon B. Hinckley	Seiichiro Utagawa
89	Operating	Adelaide Australia Temple	17 March 1999	Gordon B. Hinckley	29 May 1999	Vaughn J. Featherstone	3–10 June 2000	15 June 2000	Gordon B. Hinckley	Colin Wayne Clements
90	Operating	Melbourne Australia Temple	30 October 1998	Gordon B. Hinckley	20 March 1999	P. Bruce Mitchell	2–10 June 2000	16 June 2000	Gordon B. Hinckley	Afereti Iuli
91	Operating	Suva Fiji Temple	7 May 1998	Gordon B. Hinckley	8 May 1999	Earl M. Monson	7–12 June 2000; 25 January–6 February 2015 (after renovations)	18 June 2000	Gordon B. Hinckley	Paul B. Whippy
92	Operating	Mérida Mexico Temple	25 September 1998	Gordon B. Hinckley	16 January 1999	Carl B. Pratt	24 June – 1 July 2000	8 July 2000	Thomas S. Monson	Juan Galán Hernández
93	Operating	Veracruz Mexico Temple	14 April 1999	Gordon B. Hinckley	29 May 1999	Carl B. Pratt	26 June – 1 July 2000	9 July 2000	Thomas S. Monson	José A. González Ramos
94	Operating	Baton Rouge Louisiana Temple	October 14, 1998	Gordon B. Hinckley	May 8, 1999	Monte J. Brough	July 1–8, 2000	July 16, 2000	Gordon B. Hinckley	Kevin B. Pack
95	Operating	Oklahoma City Oklahoma Temple	March 14, 1999	Gordon B. Hinckley	July 3, 1999	Rex D. Pinegar	July 8–22, 2000	July 30, 2000	James E. Faust	Jeffrey Flynn Bellows
96	Operating	Caracas Venezuela Temple	30 September 1995	Gordon B. Hinckley	10 January 1999	Francisco J. Viñas	5–12 August 2000	20 August 2000	Gordon B. Hinckley	Abrahan Eulogio Quero Pernalete
97	Operating	Houston Texas Temple	September 30, 1997	Gordon B. Hinckley	June 13, 1998	Lynn A. Mickelsen	August 5–22, 2000	August 26, 2000	Gordon B. Hinckley	Randy C Tolman
98	Operating	Birmingham Alabama Temple	September 11, 1998	Gordon B. Hinckley	October 9, 1999	Stephen A. West	August 19–26, 2000	September 3, 2000	Gordon B. Hinckley	Duane D. Tippets
99	Operating	Santo Domingo Dominican Republic Temple	16 November 1993	Gordon B. Hinckley	18 August 1996	Richard G. Scott	26 August – 9 September 2000	17 September 2000	Gordon B. Hinckley	Francisco J. Tejada
100	Operating	Boston Massachusetts Temple	September 30, 1995	Gordon B. Hinckley	June 13, 1997	Richard G. Scott	August 29 – September 23, 2000	October 1, 2000	Gordon B. Hinckley	Kevin B. Rollins
101	Operating	Recife Brazil Temple	13 January 1995	Howard W. Hunter	11 November 1996	Gordon B. Hinckley	11 November – 2 December 2000	15 December 2000	Gordon B. Hinckley	Sergio L. Carboni
102	Operating	Porto Alegre Brazil Temple	30 September 1997	Gordon B. Hinckley	2 May 1998	James E. Faust	2–9 December 2000	17 December 2000	Gordon B. Hinckley	Jorge H. Brehm
103	Operating	Montevideo Uruguay Temple	2 November 1998	Gordon B. Hinckley	27 April 1999	Richard G. Scott	28 February – 10 March 2001	18 March 2001	Gordon B. Hinckley	Juan Pera Maidana
104	Operating	Winter Quarters Nebraska Temple	June 14, 1999	Gordon B. Hinckley	November 28, 1999	Hugh W. Pinnock	March 30 – April 14, 2001	April 22, 2001	Gordon B. Hinckley	Dale Eichmann
105	Operating	Guadalajara Mexico Temple	14 April 1999	Gordon B. Hinckley	12 June 1999	Eran A. Call	14–21 April 2001	29 April 2001	Gordon B. Hinckley	Efrén Zamora Martínez
106	Operating	Perth Australia Temple	11 June 1999	Gordon B. Hinckley	20 November 1999	Kenneth Johnson	28 April – 12 May 2001	20 May 2001	Gordon B. Hinckley	Darryl Ferris
107	Operating	Columbia River Washington Temple	April 2, 2000	Gordon B. Hinckley	October 28, 2000	Stephen A. West	October 27 – November 10, 2001	November 18, 2001	Gordon B. Hinckley	Kelly W. Brown
108	Operating	Snowflake Arizona Temple	April 2, 2000	Gordon B. Hinckley	September 23, 2000	Rex D. Pinegar	February 2–16, 2002	March 3, 2002	Gordon B. Hinckley	Richard Quentin Miller
109	Operating	Lubbock Texas Temple	April 2, 2000	Gordon B. Hinckley	November 4, 2000	Rex D. Pinegar	March 23–30, 2002	April 21, 2002	Gordon B. Hinckley	Thomas Hill Ashdown
110	Operating	Monterrey Mexico Temple	21 December 1995	Gordon B. Hinckley	4 November 2000	Lynn A. Mickelsen	8–20 April 2002	28 April 2002	Gordon B. Hinckley	Julio González
111	Operating	Campinas Brazil Temple	3 April 1997	Gordon B. Hinckley	1 May 1998	James E. Faust	20 April – 11 May 2002	17 May 2002	Gordon B. Hinckley	Flavio Cooper
112	Operating	Asunción Paraguay Temple	2 April 2000	Gordon B. Hinckley	3 February 2001	Jay E. Jensen	4–11 May 2002	19 May 2002	Gordon B. Hinckley	Alcides Yolanda Colmán
113	Operating	Nauvoo Illinois Temple	April 4, 1999	Gordon B. Hinckley	October 24, 1999	Gordon B. Hinckley	May 6 – June 22, 2002	June 27, 2002	Gordon B. Hinckley	Richard Allen Thurman
114	Operating	The Hague Netherlands Temple	16 August 1999	Gordon B. Hinckley	26 August 2000	John K. Carmack	17–31 August 2002	8 September 2002	Gordon B. Hinckley	Buddy Gout
115	Operating	Brisbane Australia Temple	20 July 1998	Gordon B. Hinckley	26 May 2001	Kenneth Johnson	10 May – 7 June 2003	15 June 2003	Gordon B. Hinckley	Garth Pitman
116	Operating	Redlands California Temple	April 21, 2001	Gordon B. Hinckley	December 1, 2001	Dieter F. Uchtdorf	August 9 – September 6, 2003	September 14, 2003	Gordon B. Hinckley	Scott Bishop
117	Operating	Accra Ghana Temple	16 February 1998	Gordon B. Hinckley	16 November 2001	Russell M. Nelson	3–20 December 2003	11 January 2004	Gordon B. Hinckley	Anthony M. Kaku
118	Operating	Copenhagen Denmark Temple	17 March 1999	Gordon B. Hinckley	24 April 1999	Spencer J. Condie	29 April – 15 May 2004	23 May 2004	Gordon B. Hinckley	Glen Tommy Michael Helmstad
119	Closed for renovation	Manhattan New York Temple	August 7, 2002	Gordon B. Hinckley	September 23, 2002	Gordon B. Hinckley	May 8 – June 5, 2004	June 13, 2004	Gordon B. Hinckley	George Kem Nixon
120	Operating	San Antonio Texas Temple	June 24, 2001	Gordon B. Hinckley	March 29, 2003	H. Bruce Stucki	April 16 – May 7, 2005	May 22, 2005	Gordon B. Hinckley	Rodney James Larsen
121	Operating	Aba Nigeria Temple	2 April 2000	Gordon B. Hinckley	23 February 2002	H. Bruce Stucki	18 June – 2 July 2005	7 August 2005	Gordon B. Hinckley	Lekwauwa O. Agbai
122	Operating	Newport Beach California Temple	April 21, 2001	Gordon B. Hinckley	August 15, 2003	Duane B. Gerrard	July 23 – August 20, 2005	August 28, 2005	Gordon B. Hinckley	Larry D Boberg
123	Operating	Sacramento California Temple	April 21, 2001	Gordon B. Hinckley	August 22, 2004	Gordon B. Hinckley	July 29 – August 26, 2006	September 3, 2006	Gordon B. Hinckley	Walter Robert (Terry) Baggs
124	Operating	Helsinki Finland Temple	2 April 2000	Gordon B. Hinckley	29 March 2003	D. Lee Tobler	21 September – 7 October 2006	22 October 2006	Gordon B. Hinckley	Ville Kervinen
125	Operating	Rexburg Idaho Temple	December 20, 2003	Gordon B. Hinckley	July 30, 2005	John H. Groberg	December 29, 2007 – January 26, 2008	February 10, 2008	Thomas S. Monson	Robert E. Chambers
126	Operating	Curitiba Brazil Temple	23 August 2002	Gordon B. Hinckley	10 March 2005	Russell M. Nelson	10 May – 24 May 2008	1 June 2008	Thomas S. Monson	Paulo Roberto Cooper
127	Operating	Panama City Panama Temple	23 August 2002	Gordon B. Hinckley	30 October 2005	Spencer V. Jones	11-26 July 2008	10 August 2008	Thomas S. Monson	Roberto Muñoz
128	Operating	Twin Falls Idaho Temple	October 2, 2004	Gordon B. Hinckley	April 15, 2006	Neil L. Andersen	July 11 – August 15, 2008	August 24, 2008	Thomas S. Monson	Kent J. Allen
129	Operating	Draper Utah Temple	October 2, 2004	Gordon B. Hinckley	August 5, 2006	Gordon B. Hinckley	January 15 – March 14, 2009	March 20, 2009	Thomas S. Monson	Dirk A. Cotterell
130	Operating	Oquirrh Mountain Utah Temple	October 1, 2005	Gordon B. Hinckley	December 16, 2006	Gordon B. Hinckley	June 1, 2009 to August 1, 2009	August 21, 2009	Thomas S. Monson	Michael C. Cannon
131	Operating	Vancouver British Columbia Temple	25 May 2006	Gordon B. Hinckley	4 August 2007	Ronald A. Rasband	2–4 April 2010	2 May 2010	Thomas S. Monson	Brian D. Leavitt
132	Operating	Gila Valley Arizona Temple	April 26, 2008	Thomas S. Monson	February 14, 2009	Neil L. Andersen	April 23 – May 15, 2010	May 23, 2010	Thomas S. Monson	Brian J. Kartchner
133	Operating	Cebu City Philippines Temple	18 April 2006	Gordon B. Hinckley	14 November 2007	Dallin H. Oaks	21 May – 5 June 2010	13 June 2010	Thomas S. Monson	Normando Ong
134	Operating	Kyiv Ukraine Temple	20 July 1998	Gordon B. Hinckley	23 June 2007	Paul B. Pieper	7–21 August 2010	29 August 2010	Thomas S. Monson	Borys Evgen’evich Vyshnevskyi
135	Operating	San Salvador El Salvador Temple	18 November 2007	Gordon B. Hinckley	20 September 2008	Don R. Clarke	1-23 July 2011	21 August 2011	Henry B. Eyring	Ángel Antonio Duarte Escobar
136	Operating	Quetzaltenango Guatemala Temple	17 December 2006	Gordon B. Hinckley	14 March 2009	Don R. Clarke	11 — 26 November 2011	11 December 2011	Dieter F. Uchtdorf	Amilcar Raul Robles
137	Operating	Kansas City Missouri Temple	October 4, 2008	Thomas S. Monson	May 8, 2010	Ronald A. Rasband	April 7–28, 2012	May 6, 2012	Thomas S. Monson	Creed R. Jones
138	Operating	Manaus Brazil Temple	23 May 2007	Gordon B. Hinckley	20 June 2008	Charles A. Didier	18 May-2 June 2012	10 June 2012	Dieter F. Uchtdorf	Ivanilson Cavalcante
139	Operating	Brigham City Utah Temple	October 3, 2009	Thomas S. Monson	July 31, 2010	Boyd K. Packer	August 18-September 15, 2012	September 23, 2012	Boyd K. Packer	Robert Ellis Steed
140	Operating	Calgary Alberta Temple	4 October 2008	Thomas S. Monson	15 May 2010	Donald L. Hallstrom	29 September-20 October 2012	28 October 2012	Thomas S. Monson	Cameron Olson
141	Operating	Tegucigalpa Honduras Temple	9 June 2006	Gordon B. Hinckley	12 September 2009	Don R. Clarke	9 February – 2 March 2013	17 March 2013	Dieter F. Uchtdorf	Nery Rodriguez
142	Operating	Gilbert Arizona Temple	April 26, 2008	Thomas S. Monson	November 13, 2010	Claudio R. M. Costa	January 18, 2014 – February 15, 2014	March 2, 2014	Henry B. Eyring & Thomas S. Monson	Leonard Greer
143	Operating	Fort Lauderdale Florida Temple	October 3, 2009	Thomas S. Monson	June 18, 2011	Walter F. González	March 29 – April 19, 2014	May 4, 2014	Dieter F. Uchtdorf	Wayne Orson Whitaker
144	Operating	Phoenix Arizona Temple	May 24, 2008	Thomas S. Monson	June 4, 2011	Ronald A. Rasband	October 10 – November 1, 2014	November 16, 2014	Thomas S. Monson	Paul David Sorensen
145	Operating	Córdoba Argentina Temple	4 October 2008	Thomas S. Monson	30 October 2010	Neil L. Andersen	17 April-2 May 2015	17 May 2015	Dieter F. Uchtdorf	Jorge E. Detlefsen
146	Operating	Payson Utah Temple	January 25, 2010	Thomas S. Monson	October 8, 2011	Dallin H. Oaks	April 24-May 23, 2015	June 7, 2015	Henry B. Eyring	Rodolfo Alalay Carlos
147	Operating	Trujillo Peru Temple	13 December 2008	Thomas S. Monson	14 September 2011	Rafael E. Pino	8-30 May 2015	21 June 2015	Dieter F. Uchtdorf	Roy D. Harline
148	Operating	Indianapolis Indiana Temple	October 2, 2010	Thomas S. Monson	September 29, 2012	Donald L. Hallstrom	July 17-August 8, 2015	August 23, 2015	Henry B. Eyring	Patrick E. Connolly
149	Operating	Tijuana Mexico Temple	2 October 2010	Thomas S. Monson	18 August 2012	Benjamin de Hoyos		13 December 2015	Dieter F. Uchtdorf	Carlos Tom Prince
150	Operating	Provo City Center Temple	October 1, 2011	Thomas S. Monson	May 12, 2012	Jeffrey R. Holland	Friday, January 15, 2016-Saturday, March 5, 2016	March 20, 2016	Dallin H. Oaks	Curtis John Hoehne
151	Operating	Sapporo Japan Temple	3 October 2009	Thomas S. Monson	22 October 2011	Gary E. Stevenson	8 July 2016 – 23 July 2016	21 August 2016	Russell M. Nelson	Motoi Tsujimoto
152	Operating	Philadelphia Pennsylvania Temple	October 4, 2008	Thomas S. Monson	September 17, 2011	Henry B. Eyring	Friday, August 5, 2016-Saturday, September 3, 2016	September 18, 2016	Henry B. Eyring	Kent A. Jordan
153	Operating	Fort Collins Colorado Temple	April 2, 2011	Thomas S. Monson	August 24, 2013	Ronald A. Rasband	Friday, August 19, 2016-Saturday, September 10, 2016	October 16, 2016	Dieter F. Uchtdorf	Alan J. Baker
154	Operating	Star Valley Wyoming Temple	October 1, 2011	Thomas S. Monson	April 25, 2015	Craig C. Christensen	Friday, September 23, 2016-Saturday, October 8, 2016	October 30, 2016	David A. Bednar	Mark W. Taylor
155	Operating	Hartford Connecticut Temple	October 2, 2010	Thomas S. Monson	August 17, 2013	Thomas S. Monson	Friday, September 30, 2016-Saturday, October 22, 2016	November 20, 2016	Henry B. Eyring	William Sowa
156	Operating	Paris France Temple	15 July 2011	Thomas S. Monson	No formal groundbreaking		22 April - 13 May 2017	21 May 2017	Henry B. Eyring	Jean-Christophe Seube
157	Operating	Tucson Arizona Temple	October 6, 2012	Thomas S. Monson	October 17, 2015	Dieter F. Uchtdorf	June 3 – 24, 2017	August 13, 2017	Dieter F. Uchtdorf	Karl B Kern
158	Operating	Meridian Idaho Temple	April 2, 2011	Thomas S. Monson	August 23, 2014	David A. Bednar	October 21 – November 11, 2017	November 19, 2017	Dieter F. Uchtdorf	Dell Elliott Jemmett
159	Operating	Cedar City Utah Temple	April 6, 2013	Thomas S. Monson	August 8, 2015	L. Whitney Clayton	October 27 – November 18, 2017	December 10, 2017	Henry B. Eyring	John Wallace Yardley
160	Operating	Concepción Chile Temple	3 October 2009	Thomas S. Monson	17 October 2015	Walter F. González	15 September-13 October 2018	28 October 2018	Russell M. Nelson	Gabriel Pérez Benavides
161	Operating	Barranquilla Colombia Temple	1 October 2011	Thomas S. Monson	20 February 2016	Juan A. Uceda	Scheduled for 3-24 November 2018	9 December 2018	Dallin H. Oaks	Hernando Camargo Pedraza
162	Operating	Rome Italy Temple	4 October 2008	Thomas S. Monson	23 October 2010	Thomas S. Monson	28 January-16 February 2019	10 March 2019	Russell M. Nelson	Daniele Lui
163	Operating	Kinshasa Democratic Republic of the Congo Temple	1 October 2011	Thomas S. Monson	12 February 2016	Neil L. Andersen	12–30 March 2019	14 April 2019	Dale G. Renlund	Jean-Jacques Alingi Egombe-O’Lioba
164	Operating	Fortaleza Brazil Temple	3 October 2009	Thomas S. Monson	15 November 2011	David A. Bednar	April 27 to May 18, 2019	2 June 2019	Ulisses Soares	Francisco J. da Silva
165	Operating	Port-au-Prince Haiti Temple	5 April 2015	Thomas S. Monson	28 October 2017	Walter F. González	3–17 August 2019	1 September 2019	David A. Bednar	Hubermann Bien Aimé
166	Operating	Lisbon Portugal Temple	2 October 2010	Thomas S. Monson	5 December 2015	Patrick Kearon	17-31 August 2019	15 September 2019	Neil L. Andersen	Celso Bueno Cabral
167	Operating	Arequipa Peru Temple	6 October 2012	Thomas S. Monson	4 March 2017	Carlos A. Godoy	November 15-30, 2019	15 December 2019	Ulisses Soares	Juan H. Mendoza Contreras
168	Operating	Durban South Africa Temple	1 October 2011	Thomas S. Monson	9 April 2016	Carl B. Cook	22 January-1 February 2020	16 February 2020	Ronald A. Rasband	Charles Magaqa
169	Operating	Winnipeg Manitoba Temple	April 2, 2011	Thomas S. Monson	December 3, 2016	Larry Y. Wilson	9-23 October 2021	31 October 2021	Gerrit W. Gong	Doug Englot
170	Operating	Pocatello Idaho Temple	2 April 2017	Thomas S. Monson	16 March 2019	Wilford W. Andersen	{{{open_house}}}	7 November 2021	M. Russell Ballard	M. Dirk Driscoll
171	Operating	Rio de Janeiro Brazil Temple	6 April 2013	Thomas S. Monson	4 March 2017	Claudio R. M. Costa	26 March-30 April 2022	8 May 2022	Gary E. Stevenson	Paulo Roberto Sant' Anna Mota
172	Operating	Yigo Guam Temple	7 October 2018	Russell M. Nelson	4 May 2019	Yoon Hwan Choi	4 May-14 May 2022	22 May 2022	David A. Bednar	Ross Henry Miller
173	Operating	Praia Cape Verde Temple	7 October 2018	Russell M. Nelson	4 May 2019	Paul V. Johnson	21 May-11 June 2022	19 June 2022	Neil L. Andersen	Austelino Silva
174	Operating	Belém Brazil Temple	3 April 2016	Thomas S. Monson	17 August 2019	Marcos A. Aidukaitis	22 October-5 November 2022	20 November 2022	Dale G. Renlund	Wilson Lima Miranda
175	Operating	Quito Ecuador Temple	3 April 2016	Thomas S. Monson	11 May 2019	Enrique R. Falabella	14-29 October 2022	20 November 2022	Quentin L. Cook	Luis Ayala
176	Operating	San Juan Puerto Rico Temple	7 October 2018	Russell M. Nelson	4 May 2019	Walter F. González	1-17 December 2022	15 January 2023	D. Todd Christofferson	Ruben Pomales
177	Operating	Richmond Virginia Temple	1 April 2018	Russell M. Nelson	11 April 2020	Randall K. Bennett	25 March-15 April 2023	7 May 2023	Dallin H. Oaks	William Frederick Mullins II
178	Operating	Helena Montana Temple	April 4, 2021	Russell M. Nelson	June 26, 2021	Vern P. Stanfill	18 May-3 June 2023	18 June 2023	Gary E. Stevenson	Lance C Brimhall
179	Operating	Saratoga Springs Utah Temple	2 April 2017	Thomas S. Monson	19 October 2019	Craig C. Christensen	15 April-8 July 2023	13 August 2023	Henry B. Eyring	Lon William Sorensen
180	Operating	Brasília Brazil Temple	2 April 2017	Thomas S. Monson	26 September 2020	Adilson de Paula Parrella	12 August-2 September 2023	17 September 2023	Neil L. Andersen	Natan Ruiz Fontes
181	Operating	Bentonville Arkansas Temple	5 October 2019	Russell M. Nelson	7 November 2020	David A. Bednar	17 June-1 July 2023	17 September 2023	David A. Bednar	David Owen Stout
182	Operating	Moses Lake Washington Temple	7 April 2019	Russell M. Nelson	10 October 2020	David L. Stapleton	4-17 August 2023	17 September 2023	Quentin L. Cook	Paul Wade Bergeson
183	Operating	McAllen Texas Temple	5 October 2019	Russell M. Nelson	21 November 2020	Art Rascon	25 August-9 September 2023	8 October 2023	Dieter F. Uchtdorf	Carlos Villarreal
184	Operating	Feather River California Temple	7 October 2018	Russell M. Nelson	18 July 2020	Paul H. Watkins	19 August-9 September 2023	8 October 2023	Ulisses Soares	John Hoybjerg
185	Operating	Bangkok Thailand Temple	5 April 2015	Thomas S. Monson	26 January 2019	Robert C. Gay	1-16 September 2023	22 October 2023	Ronald A. Rasband	Umporn Parapan
186	Temporarily closed	Okinawa Japan Temple	7 April 2019	Russell M. Nelson	5 December 2020	Takashi Wada	23 September-8 October 2023	12 November 2023	Gary E. Stevenson	Tsukasa Nagamine
187	Operating	Lima Peru Los Olivos Temple	3 April 2016	Thomas S. Monson	8 June 2019	Enrique R. Falabella	10 November-9 December 2023	14 January 2024	D. Todd Christofferson	José Alfonso Li De La Cruz
188	Operating	Orem Utah Temple	5 October 2019	Russell M. Nelson	5 September 2020	Craig C. Christensen	27 October-16 December 2023	21 January 2024	D. Todd Christofferson	Kenneth Lee Sorber
189	Operating	Red Cliffs Utah Temple	7 October 2018	Russell M. Nelson	7 November 2020	Jeffrey R. Holland	30 January-2 March 2024	24 March 2024	Henry B. Eyring	
190	Operating	Urdaneta Philippines Temple	2 October 2010	Thomas S. Monson	16 January 2019	Jeffrey R. Holland	March 15 to 30, 2024	28 April 2024	Dallin H. Oaks	Ofelia Garin Manarin Yu
191	Operating	Puebla Mexico Temple	7 October 2018	Russell M. Nelson	30 November 2019	Arnulfo Valenzuela	March 29 to April 20, 2024	19 May 2024	Gerrit W. Gong	Francisco Javier Bravo Moises
192	Operating	Taylorsville Utah Temple	5 October 2019	Russell M. Nelson	31 October 2020	Gerrit W. Gong	13 April-18 May 2024	2 June 2024	Gerrit W. Gong	
193	Operating	Cobán Guatemala Temple	5 October 2019	Russell M. Nelson	14 November 2020	Brian K. Taylor	April 25 to May 11, 2024	9 June 2024	Dale G. Renlund	Felix Rosales Choc
194	Operating	Salta Argentina Temple	1 April 2018	Russell M. Nelson	4 November 2020	Benjamin De Hoyos	May 3 to May 18, 2024	16 June 2024	D. Todd Christofferson	Guillermo Francisco De Sousa
195	Operating	Layton Utah Temple	1 April 2018	Russell M. Nelson	23 May 2020	Craig C. Christensen	19 April to 1 June 2024	16 June 2024	David A. Bednar	
196	Operating	Pittsburgh Pennsylvania Temple	5 April 2020	Russell M. Nelson	21 August 2021	Randall K. Bennett	15-31 August 2024	15 September 2024	Dieter F. Uchtdorf	James Martin Jindra
197	Operating	Mendoza Argentina Temple	7 October 2018	Russell M. Nelson	17 December 2020	Allen D. Haynie	22 August-7 September 2024	22 September 2024	Ronald A. Rasband	Rubén S. Tidei
198	Operating	San Pedro Sula Honduras Temple	7 April 2019	Russell M. Nelson	5 September 2020	José Hernández	12-28 September 2024	13 October 2024	Dale G. Renlund	Ricardo Valladares Banegas
199	Operating	Salvador Brazil Temple	7 October 2018	Russell M. Nelson	7 August 2021	Adilson de Paula Parrella	22 August-7 September 2024	20 October 2024	Neil L. Andersen	Vicente B. de Oliveira Filho
200	Operating	Deseret Peak Utah Temple	7 April 2019	Russell M. Nelson	15 May 2021	Brook P. Hales	26 September-19 October 2024	10 November 2024	Russell M. Nelson	
201	Operating	Casper Wyoming Temple	4 April 2021	Russell M. Nelson	9 October 2021	S. Gifford Nielsen	29 August-14 September 2024	24 November 2024	Quentin L. Cook	Millard L. Smathers
202	Operating	Tallahassee Florida Temple	5 April 2020	Russell M. Nelson	5 June 2021	James B. Martino	4-23 November 2024	8 December 2024	Patrick Kearon	Douglas Gilbert
203	Operating	Auckland New Zealand Temple	7 October 2018	Russell M. Nelson	13 June 2020	Ian S. Ardern	27 February–22 March 2025	13 April 2025	Patrick Kearon	Selesi’utele T. Lavea
204	Operating	Nairobi Kenya Temple	2 April 2017	Thomas S. Monson	11 September 2021	Joseph W. Sitati	17 April-3 May 2025	18 May 2025	Ulisses Soares	Dominic Chelang-at Kogo
205	Operating	Abidjan Ivory Coast Temple	5 April 2015	Thomas S. Monson	8 November 2018	Neil L. Andersen	1-17 May 2025	25 May 2025	Ronald A. Rasband	Rex Jay Allen
206	Operating	Syracuse Utah Temple	5 April 2020	Russell M. Nelson	12 June 2021	Kevin R. Duncan	10-31 May 2025	8 June 2025	Russell M. Nelson	
207	Operating	Antofagasta Chile Temple	7 April 2019	Russell M. Nelson	27 November 2020	Juan Pablo Villar	14-24 May 2025	15 June 2025	Gary E. Stevenson	Claudio A. González Salamanca
208	Operating	Farmington New Mexico Temple	April 4, 2021	Russell M. Nelson	30 April 2022	Anthony D. Perkins	17 July-2 August 2025	17 August 2025	Neil L. Andersen	
209	Operating	Elko Nevada Temple	4 April 2021	Russell M. Nelson	7 May 2022	Paul B. Pieper	30 August-13 September 2025	12 October 2025	Gary E. Stevenson	
210	Operating	Grand Junction Colorado Temple	4 April 2021	Russell M. Nelson	16 April 2022	Chi Hong (Sam) Wong	11-27 September 2025	19 October 2025	Jeffrey R. Holland	Allan Allphin
211	Operating	Bahía Blanca Argentina Temple	5 April 2020	Russell M. Nelson	9 April 2022	Joaquin E. Costa	16 October-1 November 2025	23 November 2025	Ulisses Soares	Horacio Paez
212	Operating	Burley Idaho Temple	April 4, 2021	Russell M. Nelson	4 June 2022	Brent H. Nielson	6-22 November 2025	11 January 2026	Dallin H. Oaks	Paul Kenji Tateoka
213	Operating	Alabang Philippines Temple	2 April 2017	Thomas S. Monson	4 June 2020	Evan A. Schmutz	21 November-13 December 2025	18 January 2026	David A. Bednar	Romeo Elisan
214	Operating	Harare Zimbabwe Temple	3 April 2016	Thomas S. Monson	12 December 2020	Edward Dube	22 January-7 February 2025	1 March 2026	Gerrit W. Gong	Dunstan G.B.T. Chadambuka
215	Operating	Davao Philippines Temple	7 October 2018	Russell M. Nelson	14 November 2020	Taniela B. Wakolo	26 March–10 April 2026	3 May 2026	Dale G. Renlund	Edgar Cabrera
216	Operating	Lindon Utah Temple	4 October 2020	Russell M. Nelson	23 April 2022	Kevin W. Pearson	12 March-11 April 2026	3 May 2026	Henry B. Eyring	
217	Operating	Bacolod Philippines Temple	5 October 2019	Russell M. Nelson	11 December 2021	Taniela B. Wakolo	16 April–2 May 2026	31 May 2026	Neil L. Andersen	Gregorio Horlador Lagaña
219	Operating	Willamette Valley Oregon Temple	4 April 2021	Russell M. Nelson	29 October 2022	Valeri V. Cordón	23 April – 9 May 2026	7 June 2026	Dieter F. Uchtdorf	
218	Operating	Yorba Linda California Temple	4 April 2021	Russell M. Nelson	18 June 2022	Mark A. Bragg	30 April-20 May 2026	7 June 2026	D. Todd Christofferson	R. Wyatt Powell
220	Operating	Belo Horizonte Brazil Temple	4 April 2021	Russell M. Nelson	17 June 2023	Juan A. Uceda	13-27 June 2026	16 August 2026	Dallin H. Oaks	Victor Pereira
221	Operating	Cleveland Ohio Temple	3 April 2022	Russell M. Nelson	1 June 2024	Vaiangina Sikahema	18 June – 3 July 2026	16 August 2026	David A. Bednar	Sidney Allen Connor
222	Operating	Phnom Penh Cambodia Temple	7 October 2018	Russell M. Nelson	18 September 2021	Veasna Kuonno Neang	15-22 August 2026	30 August 2026	Patrick Kearon	Sophon Sam Chan
223	Operating	Ephraim Utah Temple	1 May 2021	Russell M. Nelson	27 August 2022	Russell M. Nelson	2-19 September 2026	11 October 2026	Ronald A. Rasband	Thomas Fredrick Bailey
224	Operating	Miraflores Guatemala City Guatemala Temple	4 October 2020	Russell M. Nelson	3 December 2022	Patricio M. Giuffra	27 August-12 September 2026	11 October 2026	Gerrit W. Gong	César Augusto Hernández Galindo
225	Operating	Montpelier Idaho Temple	3 April 2022	Russell M. Nelson	17 June 2023	Ryan K. Olsen	10-26 September 2026	18 October 2026	Henry B. Eyring	Bart Orr Christensen
226	Operating	Managua Nicaragua Temple	1 April 2018	Russell M. Nelson	26 November 2022	Taylor G. Godoy	10-26 September 2026	18 October 2026	Ronald A. Rasband	Johnny Cristobal Andino
227	Operating	Cody Wyoming Temple	3 October 2021	Russell M. Nelson	27 September 2024	Steven R. Bangerter	27 August-12 September 2026	25 October 2026	Clark G. Gilbert	Jerry Michael Snyder>
228	Dedication scheduled	San Luis Potosí Mexico Temple	3 April 2022	Russell M. Nelson	9 March 2024	Sean Douglas.	24 September-10 October 2026	1 November 2026	Dale G. Renlund	Javier Romero Cuellar
229	Dedication scheduled	Wichita Kansas Temple	3 April 2022	Russell M. Nelson	7 September 2024	Steven R. Bangerter	24 September-10 October 2026	1 November 2026	Patrick Kearon	Brian Lee Rawson
230	Dedication scheduled	Torreón Mexico Temple	4 April 2021	Russell M. Nelson	10 December 2022	Hugo Montoya	22 October to 7 November 2026	22 November 2026	Gary E. Stevenson	Gustavo Castillo Ibarra
231	Dedication scheduled	Modesto California Temple	3 April 2022	Russell M. Nelson	7 October 2023	Gary B. Sabin	16-31 October 2026	22 November 2026	Quentin L. Cook	David Lewis White
232	Dedication scheduled	Pago Pago American Samoa Temple	7 April 2019	Russell M. Nelson	30 October 2021	K. Brett Nattress	4-21 November 2026	13 December 2026	Quentin L. Cook	Kalilimoku Sola August Hunt
233	Dedication scheduled	Fort Worth Texas Temple	3 October 2021	Russell M. Nelson	28 October 2023	Jose L. Alonso	5-21 November 2026	10 January 2027	TBA	Tommy Lawrence Hamilton
234	Dedication scheduled	Knoxville Tennessee Temple	3 April 2022	Russell M. Nelson	27 January 2024	Shayne M. Bowen	27 January-13 February 2027	7 March 2027	David A. Bednar	Richard G. Youngblood
235	Dedication scheduled	Smithfield Utah Temple	4 April 2021	Russell M. Nelson	18 June 2022	Quentin L. Cook (Gary E. Stevenson assisting)	25 February-27 March 2027	18 April 2027	Quentin L. Cook	Michael Lee Staheli
236	Under construction	Bengaluru India Temple	1 April 2018	Russell M. Nelson	2 December 2020	Robert K. William				
237	Under construction	Neiafu Tonga Temple	7 April 2019	Russell M. Nelson	11 September 2021	‘Inoke F. Kupu				Tukia-’I-Vava’U Havea
238	Under construction	Freetown Sierra Leone Temple	5 October 2019	Russell M. Nelson	19 March 2022	Hugo E. Martinez				
239	Under construction	Lubumbashi Democratic Republic of the Congo Temple	5 April 2020	Russell M. Nelson	20 August 2022	Matthew L. Carpenter				
240	Under construction	Heber Valley Utah Temple	3 October 2021	Russell M. Nelson	8 October 2022	Russell M. Nelson				
241	Under construction	Querétaro Mexico Temple	4 April 2021	Russell M. Nelson	7 January 2023	Adrian Ochoa				
242	Under construction	Port Vila Vanuatu Temple	4 October 2020	Russell M. Nelson	8 April 2023	K. Brett Nattress				Robert Harry Simpson
243	Under construction	Port Moresby Papua New Guinea Temple	5 October 2019	Russell M. Nelson	22 April 2023	Peter F. Meurs				Peresia Mark Peteru
244	Under construction	Kaohsiung Taiwan Temple	3 October 2021	Russell M. Nelson	23 November 2023	Benjamin M. Z. Tai				
245	Under construction	Teton River Idaho Temple	3 October 2021	Russell M. Nelson	1 June 2024	Ricardo P. Giménez				
246	Under construction	Santa Cruz Bolivia Temple	4 October 2020	Russell M. Nelson	8 June 2024	Jorge F. Zeballos				
247	Under construction	Ribeirão Preto Brazil Temple	2 October 2022	Russell M. Nelson	22 June 2024	Joni L. Koch				
248	Under construction	Londrina Brazil Temple	2 October 2022	Russell M. Nelson	17 August 2024	Ciro Schmiel				
249	Under construction	Santiago West Chile Temple	3 October 2021	Russell M. Nelson	17 August 2024	Alan R. Walker				
250	Under construction	Austin Texas Temple	3 April 2022	Russell M. Nelson	17 August 2024	Michael A. Dunn				
251	Under construction	Cagayan de Oro Philippines Temple	1 April 2018	Russell M. Nelson	31 August 2024	Carlos G. Revillo Jr.				
252	Under construction	Tarawa Kiribati Temple	4 October 2020	Russell M. Nelson	2 November 2024	Jeremy R. Jaggi				
253	Under construction	Grand Rapids Michigan Temple	2 October 2022	Russell M. Nelson	7 December 2024	Mathias Held				
254	Under construction	Tacloban City Philippines Temple	3 October 2021	Russell M. Nelson	18 January 2025	Michael B. Strong				
255	Under construction	Cali Colombia Temple	4 April 2021	Russell M. Nelson	1 March 2025	Jorge T. Becerra				
256	Under construction	Antananarivo Madagascar Temple	3 October 2021	Russell M. Nelson	15 March 2025	Denelson Silva				
257	Under construction	Birmingham England Temple	3 April 2022	Russell M. Nelson	22 March 2025	Scott D. Whiting				
258	Under construction	Lethbridge Alberta Temple	2 April 2023	Russell M. Nelson	26 April 2025	Randall K. Bennett				
259	Under construction	Lagos Nigeria Temple	7 October 2018	Russell M. Nelson	10 May 2025	Alfred Kyungu				
260	Under construction	Natal Brazil Temple	2 April 2023	Russell M. Nelson	17 May 2025	Mark D. Eddy				
261	Under construction	Benin City Nigeria Temple	5 April 2020	Russell M. Nelson	24 May 2025	Adeyinka A. Ojediran				
262	Under construction	Budapest Hungary Temple	7 April 2019	Russell M. Nelson	21 June 2025	Ruben V. Alliaud				
263	Under construction	Singapore Temple	4 April 2021	Russell M. Nelson	28 June 2025	Kelly R. Johnson				
264	Under construction	Wellington New Zealand Temple	3 April 2022	Russell M. Nelson	2 August 2025	Taniela B. Wakolo				
265	Under construction	Winchester Virginia Temple	2 April 2023	Russell M. Nelson	9 August 2025	Robert M. Daines				
266	Under construction	Brazzaville Republic of the Congo Temple	3 April 2022	Russell M. Nelson	23 August 2025	Thierry K. Mutombo				
267	Under construction	Tampa Florida Temple	3 April 2022	Russell M. Nelson	23 August 2025	Neil L. Andersen				
268	Under construction	Vancouver Washington Temple	1 October 2023	Russell M. Nelson	23 August 2025	Mark A. Bragg				
269	Under construction	Lone Mountain Nevada Temple	2 October 2022	Russell M. Nelson	25 September 2025	Michael A. Dunn				
270	Under construction	Fairbanks Alaska Temple	1 October 2023	Russell M. Nelson	27 September 2025	Peter M. Johnson				
271	Under construction	Kumasi Ghana Temple	4 April 2021	Russell M. Nelson	18 October 2025	Isaac K. Morrison				
272	Under construction	Cape Town South Africa Temple	4 April 2021	Russell M. Nelson	25 October 2025	Carlos A. Godoy				
273	Under construction	Brussels Belgium Temple	4 April 2021	Russell M. Nelson	22 November 2025	Jack N. Gerard				
274	Under construction	Jacksonville Florida Temple	2 October 2022	Russell M. Nelson	24 January 2026	Massimo De Feo				
275	Under construction	João Pessoa Brazil Temple	1 October 2023	Russell M. Nelson	24 January 2026	Joni L. Koch				
276	Under construction	Fairview Texas Temple	2 October 2022	Russell M. Nelson	21 February 2026	Jonathan S. Schmitt				
277	Under construction	Huehuetenango Guatemala Temple	2 October 2022	Russell M. Nelson	14 March 2026	Patricio M. Giuffra				
278	Under construction	Teresina Brazil Temple	2 April 2023	Russell M. Nelson	18 April 2026	Ciro Schmeil				
279	Under construction	Springfield Missouri Temple	2 April 2023	Russell M. Nelson	6 June 2026	Aroldo B. Cavalcante				
280	Under construction	Missoula Montana Temple	3 April 2022	Russell M. Nelson	6 June 2026	Jose A. Teixeira				
281	Under construction	Santos Brazil Temple	3 April 2022	Russell M. Nelson	1 August 2026	Ronald M. Barcellos				
282	Under construction	Naga Philippines Temple	2 October 2022	Russell M. Nelson	8 August 2026	Steven D. Shumway				
283	Under construction	Huntsville Alabama Temple	6 October 2024	Russell M. Nelson	15 August 2026	John D. Amos				
284	Under construction	Tulsa Oklahoma Temple	1 October 2023	Russell M. Nelson	22 August 2026	Pedro X. Larreal				
285	Under construction	Victoria British Columbia Temple	7 April 2024	Russell M. Nelson	22 August 2026	James E. Evanson				
286	Under construction	Coeur d'Alene Idaho Temple	6 October 2024	Russell M. Nelson	29 August 2026	Hutch U. Fale				
287	Under construction	Colorado Springs Colorado Temple	1 October 2023	Russell M. Nelson	12 September 2026	Karl D. Hirst				
288	Under construction	Barcelona Spain Temple	3 April 2022	Russell M. Nelson	19 September 2026	James W. McConkie III				
289	Under construction	Iquitos Peru Temple	2 April 2023	Russell M. Nelson	10 October 2026	Sandino Roman				
290	Under construction	Maceió Brazil Temple	3 April 2022	Russell M. Nelson	10 October 2026	B. Corey Cuvelier				
291	Under construction	Vienna Austria Temple	4 April 2021	Russell M. Nelson	17 October 2026	Michael Cziesla				
292	Groundbreaking scheduled	Cincinnati Ohio Temple	7 April 2024	Russell M. Nelson	7 November 2026	Alan T. Phillips				
293	Groundbreaking scheduled	Piura Peru Temple	1 October 2023	Russell M. Nelson	14 November 2026	Steven C. Barlow				
294	Groundbreaking scheduled	Cuernavaca Mexico Temple	2 October 2022	Russell M. Nelson	14 November 2026	Moisés Villanueva				
295	Groundbreaking scheduled	La Paz Bolivia Temple	3 October 2021	Russell M. Nelson	21 November 2026	Juan Pablo Villar				
296	Groundbreaking scheduled	Eket Nigeria Temple	2 October 2022	Russell M. Nelson	28 November 2026	D. Martin Goury				
297	Groundbreaking scheduled	Calabar Nigeria Temple	1 October 2023	Russell M. Nelson	5 December 2026	Christian C. Chigbundu				
298	Groundbreaking scheduled	Viña del Mar Chile Temple	1 October 2023	Russell M. Nelson	5 December 2026	Sergio R. Vargas				
299	Groundbreaking scheduled	Lehi Utah Temple	7 April 2024	Russell M. Nelson	5 December 2026	John A. McCune				
300	Announced	Russia Temple	1 April 2018	Russell M. Nelson						
301	Announced	Dubai United Arab Emirates Temple	5 April 2020	Russell M. Nelson						
302	Announced	Shanghai People's Republic of China Temple	5 April 2020	Russell M. Nelson						
303	Site announced	São Paulo East Brazil Temple	4 October 2020	Russell M. Nelson						
304	Site announced	Oslo Norway Temple	4 April 2021	Russell M. Nelson						
305	Site announced	Beira Mozambique Temple	4 April 2021	Russell M. Nelson						
306	Announced	Monrovia Liberia Temple	3 October 2021	Russell M. Nelson						
307	Site announced	Kananga Democratic Republic of the Congo Temple	3 October 2021	Russell M. Nelson						
308	Site announced	Culiacán Mexico Temple	3 October 2021	Russell M. Nelson						
309	Site announced	Vitória Brazil Temple	3 October 2021	Russell M. Nelson						
310	Site announced	Cusco Peru Temple	3 April 2022	Russell M. Nelson						
311	Site announced	Mexico City Benemérito Mexico Temple	3 April 2022	Russell M. Nelson						
312	Announced	Busan Korea Temple	2 October 2022	Russell M. Nelson						
313	Site announced	Santiago Philippines Temple	2 October 2022	Russell M. Nelson						
314	Announced	Chiclayo Peru Temple	2 October 2022	Russell M. Nelson						
315	Site announced	Buenos Aires City Center Argentina Temple	2 October 2022	Russell M. Nelson						
316	Site announced	Tacoma Washington Temple	2 October 2022	Russell M. Nelson						
317	Announced	Pachuca Mexico Temple	2 October 2022	Russell M. Nelson						
318	Site announced	Toluca Mexico Temple	2 October 2022	Russell M. Nelson						
319	Announced	Tula Mexico Temple	2 October 2022	Russell M. Nelson						
320	Site announced	Retalhuleu Guatemala Temple	2 April 2023	Russell M. Nelson						
321	Site announced	Tuguegarao City Philippines Temple	2 April 2023	Russell M. Nelson						
322	Site announced	Iloilo Philippines Temple	2 April 2023	Russell M. Nelson						
323	Site announced	Jakarta Indonesia Temple	2 April 2023	Russell M. Nelson						
324	Site announced	Hamburg Germany Temple	2 April 2023	Russell M. Nelson						
325	Site announced	Sunnyvale California Temple	2 April 2023	Russell M. Nelson						
326	Site announced	Bakersfield California Temple	2 April 2023	Russell M. Nelson						
327	Site announced	Charlotte North Carolina Temple	2 April 2023	Russell M. Nelson						
328	Site announced	Harrisburg Pennsylvania Temple	2 April 2023	Russell M. Nelson						
329	Site announced	Savai'i Samoa Temple	1 October 2023	Russell M. Nelson						
330	Announced	Cancún Mexico Temple	1 October 2023	Russell M. Nelson						
331	Announced	Huancayo Peru Temple	1 October 2023	Russell M. Nelson						
332	Site announced	Goiânia Brazil Temple	1 October 2023	Russell M. Nelson						
333	Announced	Cape Coast Ghana Temple	1 October 2023	Russell M. Nelson						
334	Announced	Luanda Angola Temple	1 October 2023	Russell M. Nelson						
335	Announced	Mbuji-Mayi Democratic Republic of the Congo Temple	1 October 2023	Russell M. Nelson						
336	Announced	Laoag Philippines Temple	1 October 2023	Russell M. Nelson						
337	Site announced	Osaka Japan Temple	1 October 2023	Russell M. Nelson						
338	Site announced	Kahului Hawaii Temple	1 October 2023	Russell M. Nelson						
339	Announced	Roanoke Virginia Temple	1 October 2023	Russell M. Nelson						
340	Site announced	Ulaanbaatar Mongolia Temple	1 October 2023	Russell M. Nelson						
341	Announced	Uturoa French Polynesia Temple	7 April 2024	Russell M. Nelson						
342	Site announced	Chihuahua Mexico Temple	7 April 2024	Russell M. Nelson						
343	Site announced	Florianópolis Brazil Temple	7 April 2024	Russell M. Nelson						
344	Site announced	Rosario Argentina Temple	7 April 2024	Russell M. Nelson						
345	Announced	Edinburgh Scotland Temple	7 April 2024	Russell M. Nelson						
346	Announced	Brisbane Australia South Temple	7 April 2024	Russell M. Nelson						
347	Site announced	Yuma Arizona Temple	7 April 2024	Russell M. Nelson						
348	Site announced	Fort Bend Texas Temple	7 April 2024	Russell M. Nelson						
349	Site announced	Des Moines Iowa Temple	7 April 2024	Russell M. Nelson						
350	Announced	Honolulu Hawaii Temple	7 April 2024	Russell M. Nelson						
351	Site announced	West Jordan Utah Temple	7 April 2024	Russell M. Nelson						
352	Announced	Maracaibo Venezuela Temple	7 April 2024	Russell M. Nelson						
353	Announced	Juchitan de Zaragoza Mexico Temple	6 October 2024	Russell M. Nelson						
354	Announced	Santa Ana El Salvador Temple	6 October 2024	Russell M. Nelson						
355	Site announced	Medellín Colombia Temple	6 October 2024	Russell M. Nelson						
356	Announced	Santiago Dominican Republic Temple	6 October 2024	Russell M. Nelson						
357	Site announced	Puerto Montt Chile Temple	6 October 2024	Russell M. Nelson						
358	Announced	Dublin Ireland Temple	6 October 2024	Russell M. Nelson						
359	Announced	Milan Italy Temple	6 October 2024	Russell M. Nelson						
360	Announced	Abuja Nigeria Temple	6 October 2024	Russell M. Nelson						
361	Announced	Kampala Uganda Temple	6 October 2024	Russell M. Nelson						
362	Announced	Maputo Mozambique Temple	6 October 2024	Russell M. Nelson						
363	Site announced	Queen Creek Arizona Temple	6 October 2024	Russell M. Nelson						
364	Site announced	El Paso Texas Temple	6 October 2024	Russell M. Nelson						
365	Announced	Milwaukee Wisconsin Temple	6 October 2024	Russell M. Nelson						
366	Announced	Summit New Jersey Temple	6 October 2024	Russell M. Nelson						
367	Announced	Price Utah Temple	6 October 2024	Russell M. Nelson						
368	Announced	Reynosa Mexico Temple	6 April 2025	Russell M. Nelson						
369	Announced	Chorrillos Peru Temple	6 April 2025	Russell M. Nelson						
370	Announced	Rivera Uruguay Temple	6 April 2025	Russell M. Nelson						
371	Site announced	Campo Grande Brazil Temple	6 April 2025	Russell M. Nelson						
372	Announced	Porto Portugal Temple	6 April 2025	Russell M. Nelson						
373	Announced	Uyo Nigeria Temple	6 April 2025	Russell M. Nelson						
374	Announced	San Jose del Monte Philippines Temple	6 April 2025	Russell M. Nelson						
375	Announced	Nouméa New Caledonia Temple	6 April 2025	Russell M. Nelson						
376	Announced	Liverpool Australia Temple	6 April 2025	Russell M. Nelson						
377	Site announced	Caldwell Idaho Temple	6 April 2025	Russell M. Nelson						
378	Site announced	Flagstaff Arizona Temple	6 April 2025	Russell M. Nelson						
379	Site announced	Rapid City South Dakota Temple	6 April 2025	Russell M. Nelson						
378	Site announced	Greenville South Carolina Temple	6 April 2025	Russell M. Nelson						
381	Site announced	Norfolk Virginia Temple	6 April 2025	Russell M. Nelson						
382	Site announced	Spanish Fork Utah Temple	6 April 2025	Russell M. Nelson						
383	Announced	Portland Maine Temple	14 December 2025	Dallin H. Oaks						
384	Announced	Marysville Washington Temple	19 April 2026	Dallin H. Oaks						
385	Site announced	Otavalo Ecuador Temple	14 May 2026	Dallin H. Oaks						
	Efforts halted in 1830s	Temple Lot	April 1829	Joseph Smith	August 1831	Joseph Smith (land dedicated)				
	Historic site	Kirtland Temple	December 27, 1832	Joseph Smith	June 5, 1833			March 27, 1836	Joseph Smith	
	Efforts halted in 1830s	Far West Temple	April 16, 1838	Joseph Smith	July 4, 1838	Quorum of the Twelve				
	Efforts halted in 1830s	Adam-ondi-Ahman Temple	April 26, 1838	Joseph Smith	October 1838	Joseph Smith				
	Destroyed	Nauvoo Temple	August 1840		February 18, 1841			May 1, 1846	Orson Hyde	
	Destroyed	Apia Samoa Temple (original)	July 2, 1980		February 19, 1981	Spencer W. Kimball		August 5, 1983	Gordon B. Hinckley	
	Efforts suspended in 2006	Harrison New York Temple	September 30, 1995	Gordon B. Hinckley						

==== Rededications ====
The following table lists temples that have been rededicated after their original dedication. The corresponding open house as well as the person officiating in each dedication is also listed. As of 2026, no temples have been rededicated more than twice.

#	Name	Status	Rededication			2nd Rededication		
#	Name	Status	Open House	date	by	Open House	date	by
1	St. George Utah Temple	Operating	October 15–25, 1975 (after renovations)	November 11, 1975	Spencer W. Kimball	September 15 – November 11, 2023	December 10, 2023	Jeffrey R. Holland
2	Logan Utah Temple	Operating	February 5 – March 3, 1979 (after renovations)	March 13, 1979	Spencer W. Kimball			
3	Manti Utah Temple	Operating	June 6–8, 1985 (after renovations)	June 14, 1985	Gordon B. Hinckley	14 March – 5 April 2024	21 April 2024	Russell M. Nelson
4	Salt Lake Temple	Closed for renovation	5 April–1 October 2027	TBA	TBA			
5	Laie Hawaii Temple	Operating	October 22 – November 13, 2010	June 13, 1978	Spencer W. Kimball		November 21, 2010	Thomas S. Monson
6	Cardston Alberta Temple	Operating		2 July 1962	Hugh B. Brown	6–15 June 1991 (after renovation)	22 June 1991	Gordon B. Hinckley
7	Mesa Arizona Temple	Operating	March 19 – April 3, 1975	April 16, 1975	Spencer W. Kimball	October 16 – November 20, 2021	December 12, 2021	Dallin H. Oaks
8	Idaho Falls Idaho Temple	Operating	April 22 – May 20, 2017 (following renovations)	June 4, 2017	Henry B. Eyring			
9	Bern Switzerland Temple	Operating	8–17 October 1992	23 November 1992	Gordon B. Hinckley			
11	Hamilton New Zealand Temple	Operating	26 August – 17 September 2022	16 October 2022	Dieter F. Uchtdorf			
12	London England Temple	Operating	8–14 October 1992	18 October 1992	Gordon B. Hinckley			
13	Oakland California Temple	Operating	May 11 – June 1, 2019 (following renovations)	June 16, 2019	Dallin H. Oaks			
14	Ogden Utah Temple	Operating	August 1 – September 6, 2014 (after renovations)	September 21, 2014	Thomas S. Monson			
15	Provo Utah Rock Canyon Temple	Closed for renovation						
16	Washington D.C. Temple	Operating	April 28 – June 11, 2022	August 14, 2022	Russell M. Nelson			
17	São Paulo Brazil Temple	Operating	17 January–14 February 2004	22 February 2004	Gordon B. Hinckley			
18	Tokyo Japan Temple	Operating	3–18 June 2022 (following renovation)	3 July 2022	Henry B. Eyring			
20	Jordan River Utah Temple	Operating	March 17 – April 28, 2018 (after renovations)	May 20, 2018	Henry B. Eyring			
21	Atlanta Georgia Temple	Operating		November 14, 1997	Gordon B. Hinckley	April 9–23, 2011	May 1, 2011	Thomas S. Monson
22	Apia Samoa Temple	Operating	6–27 August 2005	4 September 2005	Gordon B. Hinckley			
23	Nuku'alofa Tonga Temple	Operating	29 September–20 October 2007	4 November 2007	Russell M. Nelson			
24	Santiago Chile Temple	Operating	21 January–11 February 2006	12 March 2006	Gordon B. Hinckley			
25	Papeete Tahiti Temple	Operating	14 October–4 November 2006	12 November 2006	L. Tom Perry			
26	Mexico City Mexico Temple	Operating	20 October – 8 November 2008	16 November 2008	Thomas S. Monson	14 August – 5 September 2015	September 13, 2015	Henry B. Eyring
27	Boise Idaho Temple	Operating	October 13–November 10, 2012	May 29, 1987	James E. Faust		November 18, 2012	Thomas S. Monson
30	Dallas Texas Temple	Operating		March 5, 1989	Gordon B. Hinckley			
33	Freiberg Germany Temple	Operating	17–31 August 2002	7 September 2002	Gordon B. Hinckley	12–27 August 2016	4 September 2016	Dieter F. Uchtdorf
34	Stockholm Sweden Temple	Closed for renovation						
35	Chicago Illinois Temple	Operating		October 8, 1989	Gordon B. Hinckley			
39	Buenos Aires Argentina Temple	Operating	4–25 August 2012	9 September 2012	Henry B. Eyring			
41	Frankfurt Germany Temple	Operating	13–28 September 2019	20 October 2019	Dieter F. Uchtdorf			
44	Toronto Ontario Temple	Operating	13 February–8 March 2025	23 March 2025	Jeffrey R. Holland			
45	San Diego California Temple	Operating	18 June-11 July 2026	23 August 2026	D. Todd Christofferson			
46	Orlando Florida Temple	Closed for renovation						
48	Hong Kong China Temple	Operating	23–29 May 2022	19 June 2022	Gerrit W. Gong			
53	Monticello Utah Temple	Operating	November 2–9, 2002	November 17, 2002	Gordon B. Hinckley			
54	Anchorage Alaska Temple	Operating	January 27–31, 2004	February 8, 2004	Gordon B. Hinckley			
60	Columbus Ohio Temple	Operating	April 29 – May 13, 2023	June 4, 2023	M. Russell Ballard			
68	Raleigh North Carolina Temple	Operating	September 21–28, 2019	October 13, 2019	M. Russell Ballard			
70	Kona Hawaii Temple	Closed for renovation						
80	Memphis Tennessee Temple	Operating	April 13–20, 2019	May 5, 2019	Jeffrey R. Holland			
86	Montreal Quebec Temple	Operating	5–14 November 2015	22 November 2015	Henry B. Eyring			
91	Suva Fiji Temple	Operating		21 February 2016	Henry B. Eyring			
94	Baton Rouge Louisiana Temple	Operating	October 26–November 2, 2019	November 17, 2019	Quentin L. Cook			
95	Oklahoma City Oklahoma Temple	Operating	April 24–May 1, 2019	May 19, 2019	Henry B. Eyring			
97	Houston Texas Temple	Operating		April 22, 2018	M. Russell Ballard			
112	Asunción Paraguay Temple	Operating	12–19 October 2019	3 November 2019	D. Todd Christofferson			
119	Manhattan New York Temple	Closed for renovation						

== See also ==
- Temple (LDS Church)
- Temple architecture (LDS Church)
- Category:Temples (LDS Church)
- List of buildings
