= Portland Temple =

The Portland Temple may refer to one of the following temples of the Church of Jesus Christ of Latter-day Saints:

- Portland Maine Temple
- Portland Oregon Temple
