= Torreón Mexico Temple =

- Dedication scheduled
- Interactive map of Torreón Mexico Temple
- Number: 231
- Dedication: 22 November 2026, Gary E. Stevenson
- Site: 0.89 acres (0.36 ha)
- Floor area: 10,000 ft^{2} (930 m^{2})
- Height: 91.9 ft (28.0 m)

Church chronology
← Modesto California Temple	Torreón Mexico Temple	→ Fort Worth Texas Temple

Additional information
- Announced: 4 April 2021, Russell M. Nelson
- Groundbreaking: 11 December 2022, by Hugo Montoya
- Open house: 22 October - 7 November 2026
- Location: Gomez Palacio, Mexico
- Coordinates: 25°33′12.24″N 103°29′56.99″W
- Baptistries: 1
- Ordinance rooms: 1
- Sealing rooms: 1

The Torreón Mexico Temple is a temple of the Church of Jesus Christ of Latter-day Saints in Gómez Palacio, Durango, Mexico. The intent to build the temple was announced on April 4, 2021, by church president Russell M. Nelson during general conference. It is the church's 16th templein Mexico, expected to serve more than 32,000 Latter-day Saints in the La Laguna region.

A groundbreaking ceremony was held on December 11, 2022, with Hugo Montoya, a general authority and president of the church's Mexico Area, presiding. The temple is scheduled to be dedicated on November 22, 2026, by Gary E. Stevenson of the Quorum of the Twelve Apostles. It is a single-story building of approximately 929 square metres (10,000 sq ft), with a two-story tower featuring a square base and domed cupola.

== History and planned events ==
The intent to construct the temple was announced by church president Russell M. Nelson on April 4, 2021, during general conference. It is anticipated to serve more than 32,000 church members in the La Laguna metropolitan area, including the metropolitan area and surrounding areas of Durango, Coahuila, and southern Chihuahua.

A groundbreaking ceremony, marking the beginning of construction, was held on December 11, 2022. Hugo Montoya, president of the church's Mexico Area, presided at the ceremony, which was attended by religious and civil authorities from Gómez Palacio and the government of Durango.

The temple is scheduled to be dedicated on November 22, 2026, by Gary E. Stevenson of the Quorum of the Twelve Apostles in a single session. Before construction of the temple, members in the region traveled to the Monterrey Mexico Temple to participate in ordinances.

== Design and architecture ==
The Torreón Mexico Temple is a single-story building of approximately 929 square metres (10,000 sq ft). The exterior design has white walls set at right angles to one another, with an arched structure framing the main entrance. A two-story tower rises above the temple, with a square base and a domed cupola at the top. The temple is on a 0.36 hectares (0.89 acres) site at the intersection of París and Ámsterdam streets in the El Campestre neighborhood of Gómez Palacio. The grounds are planned with a garden, brick sidewalks, yellow flowers, and pink trees. The temple includes a baptistry, sealing room, and ordinance room. The building is designed for ordinances sacred to church members, including baptisms for the deceased and sealings.

== Temple president ==
The church's temples are directed by a temple president and matron, each typically serving for a term of three years. The president and matron oversee the administration of temple operations and provide guidance and training for both temple patrons and staff. Gustavo C. and Hipólita L. Castillo will serve as the first temple president and matron, respectively.

== See also ==
- Comparison of temples (LDS Church)
- List of temples (LDS Church)
- List of temples by geographic region (LDS Church)
- Temple architecture (LDS Church)
- The Church of Jesus Christ of Latter-day Saints in Mexico
