= Open house (LDS Church) =

Open house is a period prior to the formal dedication of a Temple in The Church of Jesus Christ of Latter Day Saints (LDS). It is a time when the Temple is open to any member of the public to enter, regardless if they are a member of the LDS Church or not. After dedication, the Temple is closed to non-members.

== History ==
Historically, LDS Temples would be opened to the public for a number of weeks prior to dedication after construction or renovation. This would be done in order to foster good community relations and allow people to see the Temple with the hope of giving them a better understanding of the LDS faith. They also do tours in order to bring transparency to LDS ceremonies for non-LDS members. After the open house, the Temple is dedicated which means it is no longer open to non-LDS members and only those with a Temple recommend are able to enter.

== Process ==
An open house will often involve free guided tours of the Temple by LDS Church members. Ordinarily the tours take place on six days excluding Sundays. However, exceptions can be made to allow for tours on Sunday. There are no dress code requirements, but the LDS Church encouraged smart casual attire. The Temple works with the local emergency services to ensure the open house is carried out safely due to the large numbers of people that it usually attracts.
