= Robert M. Daines =

American lawyer

General Authority Seventy
- April 1, 2023
- Called by: Russell M. Nelson

Personal details
- Born: July 28, 1964 (age 62); Bloomington, Indiana
- Alma mater: Brigham Young University (B.A., B.S.); Yale Law School (J.D.)
- Spouse(s): Ruth Ann Glazier (m. 1988)
- Children: 5

Robert Merrill Daines (born July 28, 1964) is an American lawyer and current Pritzker professor of law and business at Stanford Law School. His work focuses on the intersection of law and economics, such as issues related to IPOs and mandatory disclosure regulations.

Daines has a bachelor's degree from Brigham Young University (BYU) and a juris doctor from Yale Law School. Prior to joining Stanford's faculty in 2004, Daines was a professor at New York University from 1997 to 2004. Daines has served as associate dean for global and graduate programs at Stanford Law School and also been head of the admissions committee for Stanford Law School. Daines is a member of the Church of Jesus Christ of Latter-day Saints and was called as a general authority at the church's general conference on April 1, 2023. Daines and his wife are the parents of five children.
