= Portland Maine Temple =

Planned temple of the Church of Jesus Christ of Latter-day Saints in Maine

- Announced
- Number: TBD
- Official website • News & images

Additional information
- Announced: 14 December 2025, by Dallin H. Oaks
- Location: Portland

The Portland Maine Temple is an announced temple of the Church of Jesus Christ of Latter-day Saints to be built in Portland, Maine, United States. It will be the first temple in Maine. It is the first announced under the presidency of Dallin H. Oaks, and the first announced by someone who was not a member of the church's First Presidency.

== History ==
The intent to construct a temple in Portland, Maine was announced on December 14, 2025 by Allen D. Haynie, a general authority and president of the church's United States Northeast Area, during a local Christmas devotional in North Yarmouth. Haynie shared a First Presidency decision that future temples would be announced locally by either a member of the Quorum of the Twelve Apostles or an area presidency. The Portland Maine Temple was the first announced under the presidency of Dallin H. Oaks, who became the church president two months prior, and the first announced by someone who was not a member of the First Presidency.

Temples in the Northeastern United States
- = Operating
- = Under construction
- = Announced
- = Temporarily Closed

== See also ==
- The Church of Jesus Christ of Latter-day Saints in Maine
- Comparison of temples (LDS Church)
- List of temples (LDS Church)
- List of temples by geographic region (LDS Church)
- Temple architecture (Latter-day Saints)
- Architecture of the Church of Jesus Christ of Latter-day Saints
