= Porto Alegre Brazil Temple =

Temple of the LDS church

- Interactive map of Porto Alegre Brazil Temple
- Number: 102
- Dedication: 17 December 2000, by Gordon B. Hinckley
- Site: 2 acres (0.81 ha)
- Floor area: 10,700 ft^{2} (990 m^{2})
- Height: 71 ft (22 m)
- Official website • News & images

Church chronology
← Recife Brazil Temple	Porto Alegre Brazil Temple	→ Montevideo Uruguay Temple

Additional information
- Announced: 30 September 1997, by Gordon B. Hinckley
- Groundbreaking: 2 May 1998, by James E. Faust
- Open house: 2–9 December 2000
- Current president: Jorge H. Brehm
- Designed by: Andre Belo de Faria and Church A&E Services
- Location: Porto Alegre, Brazil
- Coordinates: 30°2′2.569200″S 51°9′28.32480″W
- Exterior finish: Cotton-white granite from Ceara State of Brazil
- Design: Classic modern, single-spire design
- Baptistries: 1
- Ordinance rooms: 2 (two-stage progressive)
- Sealing rooms: 2

The Porto Alegre Brazil Temple is a temple of the Church of Jesus Christ of Latter-day Saints located in Porto Alegre, Rio Grande do Sul, Brazil. The intent to build the temple was announced on September 30, 1997, by church president Gordon B. Hinckley during general conference. It is the third constructed in Brazil, following the São Paulo and Recife temples, and became the church's 102nd operating temple when it was dedicated on December 17, 2000.

Located on a 2-acre hillside site in Porto Alegre’s Vila Jardim neighborhood, the temple has a spire with a statue of the angel Moroni, and its exterior is cotton-white granite sourced from Ceará, Brazil. The temple was designed by André Belo de Faria, using a modern, single-spire design.

A groundbreaking ceremony was held on May 2, 1998, presided over by James E. Faust, second counselor in the First Presidency. After construction was completed, over 25,000 visitors attended the public open house, with more than 1,000 requesting missionary visits. Though the temple has not undergone major structural renovations, enhancements such as a four-story patron housing facility (completed in 2013) and a parking lot expansion (2019) were added to better serve members traveling from surrounding regions.

== History ==
The temple was announced by church president Gordon B. Hinckley on September 30, 1997, during general conference. The temple is on a 2-acre property located at Rua General Salvador Pinheiro 50 in the Vila Jardim neighborhood of Porto Alegre, overlooking the city and the Guaíba River. Preliminary plans were for a structure of approximately 13,325 square feet, designed by architect André Belo de Faria, with the exterior using cotton-white granite from Ceará State.

The groundbreaking ceremony took place on May 2, 1998, presided over by James E. Faust, second counselor in the First Presidency, and was attended by more than 3,500 church members and community leaders. At the ceremony, Faust invited a young girl and boy to join him in turning the first shovelful of earth; the following day, the girl found Faust at a regional conference to thank him with a hug.

Following completion, a public open house was held from December 2 to December 9, 2000. Approximately 25,325 visitors toured the temple, with over 1,000 requesting missionary visits afterwards.

The Porto Alegre Brazil Temple was dedicated by in Hinckley in four sessions on December 17, 2000, with 7,590 church members attending. At the time, it was the church's 102nd operating temple and the third in Brazil, following those in São Paulo and Recife. In 2013, a four-story patron housing facility was completed adjacent to the temple to accommodate members traveling from distant regions. In 2019, the temple’s parking lot was expanded, adding approximately 40 new spaces after the removal of adjacent residential properties in 2015, effectively doubling its original capacity.

== Design and architecture ==
The Porto Alegre Brazil Temple uses a classic modern style and has a steeple with a statue of the angel Moroni. It was designed by André Belo de Faria, in coordination with the church architecture & engineering services group.

The temple is on a 2-acre (0.8 hectare) hillside site in the Vila Jardim neighborhood, overlooking Porto Alegre and the Guaíba River. The landscaping incorporates flowerbeds, palm trees, and local vegetation.

The structure stands approximately 71 feet (22 meters) tall, with a single spire that has a statue of the angel Moroni on its top. The building’s exterior uses cotton-white granite sourced from the Brazilian state of Ceará, With a total of 13,325 square feet (1,238 m²), it has a layout typical of smaller temple designs built under Hinckley’s direction.

== Temple presidents ==
The church's temples are directed by a temple president and matron, each typically serving for a term of three years. The president and matron oversee the administration of temple operations and provide guidance and training for both temple patrons and staff.

Serving from 2000 to 2003, Lynn A. Sorensen was the first president, with Sara B. Sorensen, beginning at the time of the temple's dedication in 2000. As of 2024, Jorge H. Brehm is the president, with Gloria M. Brehm serving as matron.

== Admittance ==
After construction was completed, a public open house was held from December 2 to December 9, 2000. The temple was dedicated by church president Gordon B. Hinckley on December 17, 2000, in four sessions. Like all the church's temples, it is not used for Sunday worship services. To members of the church, temples are regarded as sacred houses of the Lord. Once dedicated, only church members with a current temple recommend can enter for worship.

== See also ==
Temples in the Brazil
- = Operating
- = Under construction
- = Announced
- = Temporarily Closed
- Comparison of temples of The Church of Jesus Christ of Latter-day Saints
- List of temples of The Church of Jesus Christ of Latter-day Saints
- List of temples of The Church of Jesus Christ of Latter-day Saints by geographic region
- Temple architecture (Latter-day Saints)
- The Church of Jesus Christ of Latter-day Saints in Brazil
