= The Church of Jesus Christ of Latter-day Saints in Brazil =

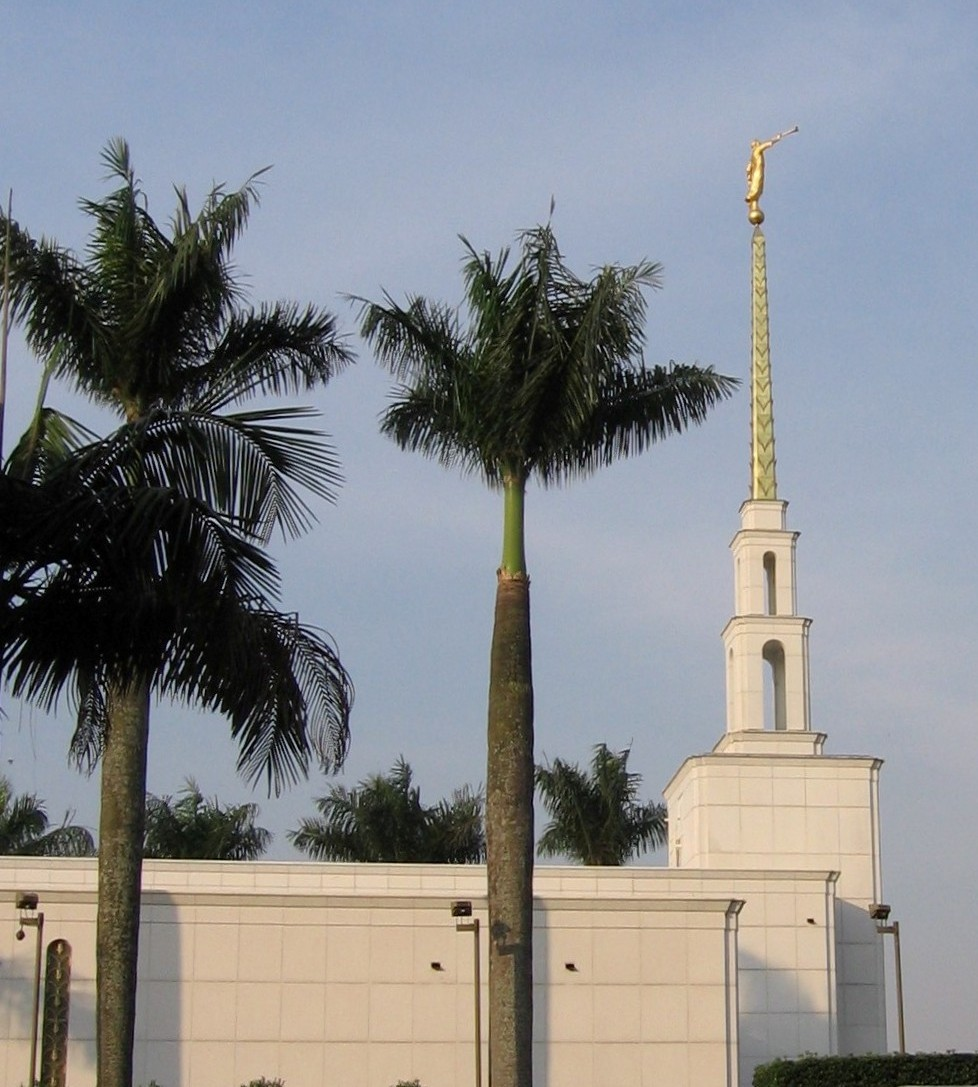
- The Sao Paulo Brazil Temple
- Area: Brazil
- Members: 1,573,360 (2025)
- Stakes: 289
- Districts: 34
- Wards: 1,650
- Branches: 358
- Total congregations: 2,008
- Missions: 37
- Temples: 11 operating; 6 under construction; 7 announced; 24 total
- FamilySearch Centers: 611

The Church of Jesus Christ of Latter-day Saints (LDS Church) (Portuguese: A Igreja de Jesus Cristo dos Santos dos Últimos Dias) was established in Brazil in 1926 with the opening of the South American Mission. Missionary work was focused on small German immigrant colonies in South Brazil. The LDS Church was forced to expand missionary work to Brazilians and Portuguese speakers when non-Portuguese languages were banned in public meetings in 1938. The Brazil Mission was opened on February 9, 1935, with Rulon S. Howells as mission president. The first Portuguese translation of the Book of Mormon was published in 1939.

During Howells's second presidency in the early 1950s, he instituted programs to genealogically screen Brazilians interested in the LDS Church or its members in Brazil. Church policy at that time prevented males with African ancestry from being ordained to a priesthood office. In 1965, church president David O. McKay changed the policy in Brazil, requiring that all men be assumed qualified to receive the priesthood unless there was obvious evidence showing otherwise. The first stake in Brazil was established in São Paulo on May 1, 1966. In 1978, the São Paulo Brazil Temple was completed, becoming the church's first temple in Brazil and South America. The temple was thought to be one factor that influenced the 1978 Revelation on Priesthood that allowed male church members of any race to receive the priesthood.

As of December 31, 2025, the LDS Church membership records reported 1,573,360 members in Brazil. The 2010 Brazilian census reported 226,509 self-identifying specifically as LDS Church. Brazil has overtaken Mexico for the most members of the LDS Church in South America and the 2nd most members of any country worldwide, behind the United States.

== History ==
Membership
Year	Members
1940	233
1950	648
1960	2,644
1970	33,104
1979	71,510
1989*	302,000
1999	743,182
2009	1,102,674
2019	1,429,935
2025	1,573,360
*Membership was published as a rounded number. Source: https://newsroom.churchofjesuschrist.org/facts-and-statistics/country/brazil

=== Beginnings ===
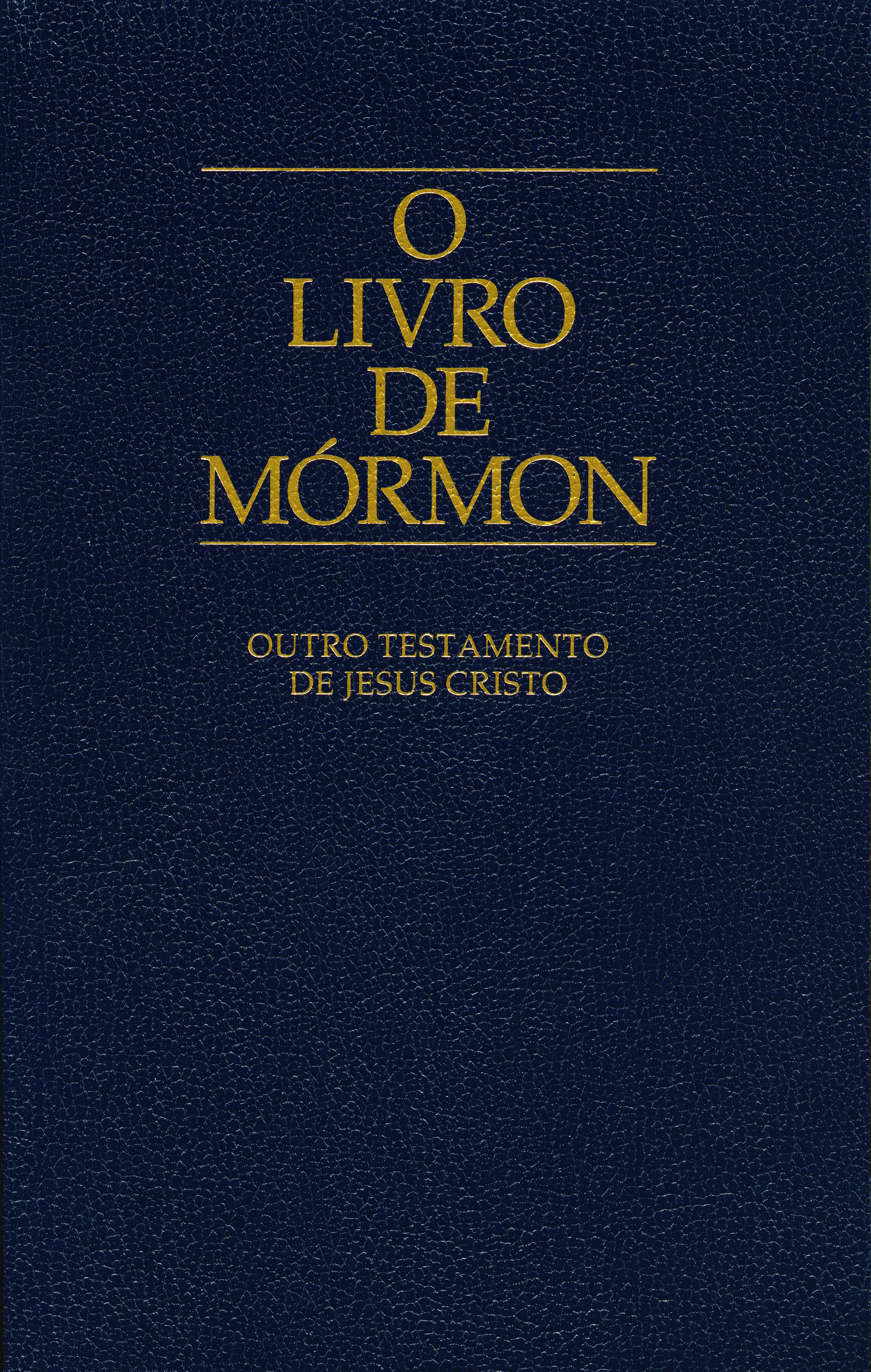
The Portuguese translation of the Book of Mormon, originally published in 1939

Andrew Jenson traveled to South America in 1923 to determine whether the conditions were right for missionary work. However, he was not impressed with Brazil's prospects and missionaries were, instead, sent to Argentina. Max and Amalie Zapf were the first known members of the LDS Church in Brazil. They were immigrants who had joined the church in their native Germany before moving to Brazil in 1913. The Zapfs did not find other members of the LDS Church in Brazil until ten years later. The Zapfs met Augusta Kuhlmann Lippelt and her family, other LDS Church members who emigrated from Germany. The Zapfs would eventually relocate to be closer to the Lippelts. This represented the first permanent LDS Church presence in Brazil. An immigrant from Germany, Reinhold Stoof was made president of the South American Mission in May 1926. Stoof was headquartered in Buenos Aires, but realized that congregations of German immigrants were too sparse in Argentina, so he sent missionaries to the larger German colonies in Southern Brazil. The first two missionaries in Brazil were William Fred Heinz and Emil A. J. Schindler. Missionaries arrived in 1928, but due to the priesthood restriction, they were instructed to only work with German people living in the southern part of the country. Missionaries found a group of 16,000 Germans in Joinville and began baptizing them. The first people baptized in Brazil were Berta Sell and her four children on April 14, 1929. In 1929, the LDS Church acquired the first property in Brazil to serve as a meeting place for its members. On July 6, 1930, the first branch in Joinville was created. The first LDS-owned meetinghouse was dedicated on October 25, 1931, in Joinville.

The Brazil Mission was established on February 9, 1935, with Rulon S. Howells as mission president. Howells headquartered the mission in São Paulo, which officially opened on May 25, 1935. At the time, the Brazilian Mission covered what is now modern Brazil, Bolivia, Ecuador, Colombia, Venezuela, Guyana, Suriname, and French Guiana. During this time, the mission targeted the German speaking people in Brazil. Church literature in German was ordered, and missionaries were taught German for the first three years of missionary work there. After more Portuguese-speaking Brazilians became interested, which had a high proportion of people with mixed ancestry, LDS officials advised missionaries to avoid teaching people who appeared to have black ancestry. When the Brazilian government outlawed the use of non-Portuguese languages in public meetings in 1938, the mission switched from a German language mission to a Portuguese-speaking one. Consequently, missionaries in Brazil began learning Portuguese. However, missionaries still remained in Southern Brazil, where there would be more European immigrants and less interracial Brazilians. The missionaries later realized that they would not be able to avoid teaching and interacting with people of African descent, because housing was not segregated in Brazil.

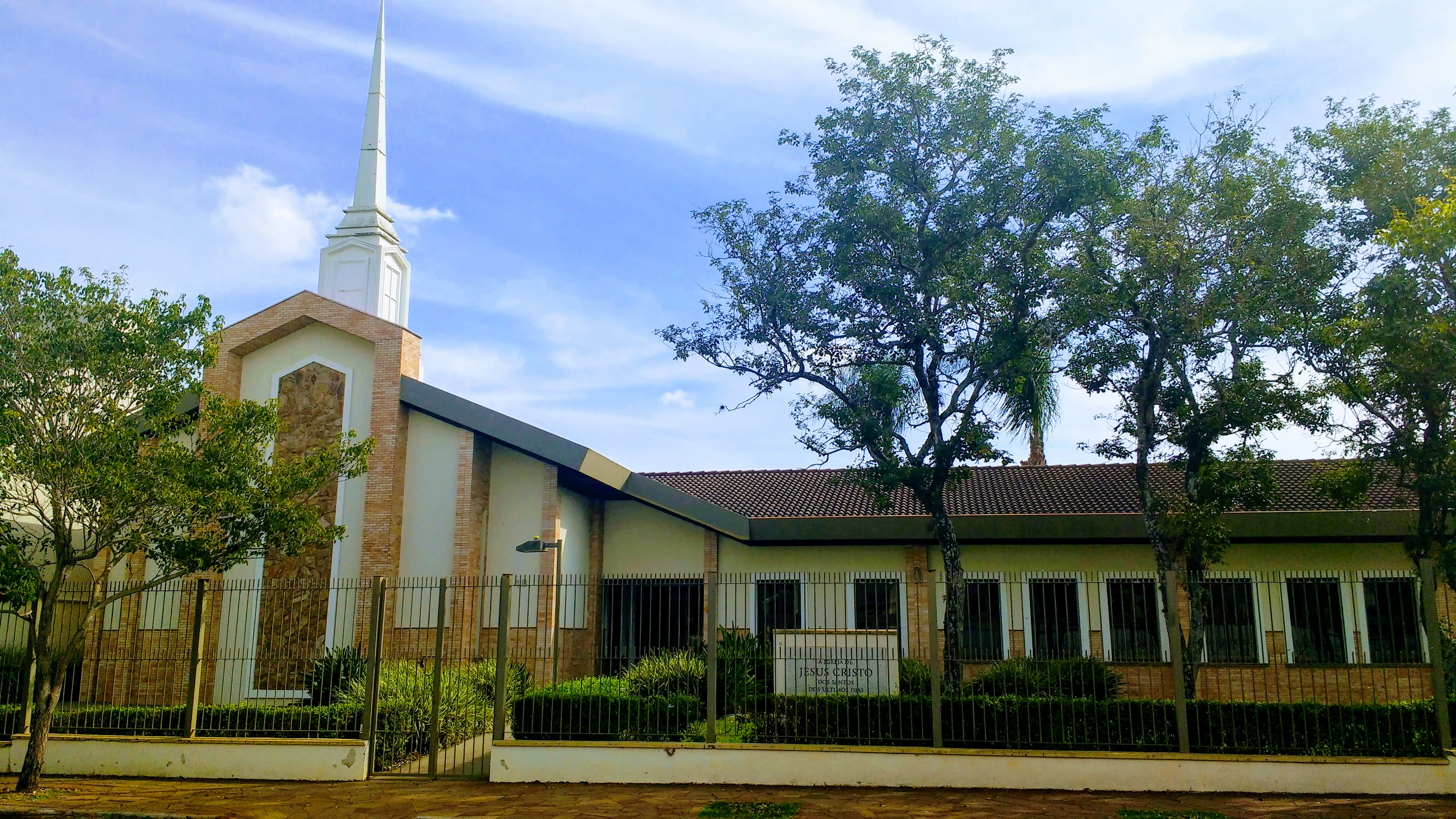
A meetinghouse of the Church of Jesus Christ of Latter-day Saints in Santo Ângelo, Rio Grande do Sul, Brazil.

John Alden Bowers became mission president in 1938, and he oversaw the translation of missionary pamphlets and the Book of Mormon into Portuguese. Howells asked Mário Pedroso, a Brazilian native, to work on a translation of the Book of Mormon into Portuguese. Daniel G. Shupe worked on his own Portuguese translation of the Book of Mormon. A retired Brazilian newspaper editor compared the two translations to determine which was the best translation of the English words. The first Portuguese translation of the Book of Mormon was published in Brazil in 1939. One of the early missionaries in Brazil, serving in 1939, was James E. Faust. During World War II, many missionaries were sent home. William West Seegmiller became mission president in 1942, serving for three years, but no missionaries were sent to Brazil during his presidency. Harold Morgan Rex became mission president in 1945 with only two missionaries sent to Brazil before 1946 when normal missionary work resumed. In 1949, Rulon S. Howells became mission president again. On his way to Brazil, Howells stopped in Washington D.C. and met the Brazilian Ambassador to the United States, Maurício Nabuco. Two of the governors of Brazil helped him register the LDS Church with the Brazilian government, as well as achieving tax exemption status. The Doctrine and Covenants and the Pearl of Great Price were translated into Portuguese in 1950 and 1952, respectively. In 1954, LDS Church president David O. McKay visited Brazil during a world tour.

=== Mission development and racial implications ===
During the 1950s, in some areas in Brazil, up to 80% of the population was thought to have African ancestry, however this was difficult to prove due to inadequate recorded evidence. During the time Howells served for the second time as mission president, the primary goal for the Brazil Mission was racial purity for all new converts. He told the missionaries to scrutinize people's appearances for hints of black ancestry and avoid teaching those who had any black ancestry. Missionaries were instructed to look for relatives of the investigators if they were not sure about their racial heritage. If during the course of the lessons, it was discovered they had black ancestry, they were discouraged from investigating the church. In Piracicaba, where several black people had joined, Howells segregated the branch so that black people would stop coming. He instituted a genealogy program to determine race and screened all baptisms. If it was discovered a member had black ancestry, their records were marked. In the 1960s, church protocol was to first consult physical appearance, then family and genealogical records. Sometimes church leaders, including the First Presidency, were consulted to make overriding decisions about an individual's lineage; leaders would declare "racial purity" sometimes despite African ties in a member's heritage. If unsuccessful, Patriarchal blessings would be used to establish lineage. Usually, Patriarchal blessings were considered "final authority".

Generally, missionaries and LDS Church leaders avoided educating members about church policy surrounding black members of the church. Sometimes presentations urged members to avoid interracial marriage, but there was a lack of information about the church's policies and reasons behind them. Furthermore, the Portuguese translation of The Way to Perfection neglected to include information regarding the "lineage of Cain". Methods to determine lineage were vague and unclear. In 1965, McKay changed policies in Brazil that required all male converts in to be assumed qualified to receive the priesthood unless there was hard evidence otherwise. Brazilian church members were uncomfortable with the policies. They were often accused of racism by friends and family members, but they did not feel like they had the right or ability to suggest change. They believed the policy was revelation from God and only further revelation from God could change the policy.

In 1959, the Brazil South Mission was created, increasing the number of missionaries sent to Brazil. William Grant Bangerter, president of the northern Brazil mission, sent missionaries into areas that were previously avoided due to race. Previously, Bangerter sent missionaries to Recife and Pernambuco as a test to gauge the success of future missionary work. They did not have success at first, due to the large African-Brazilian population, anti-American feelings, and lack of familiarity with Mormonism. Missionary work improved after the baptism of Milton Soares, Jr. and his family. Soares influenced the baptism of many others and he became the branch president on October 27, 1961. Mission presidents began sending missionaries into North Brazil. Branches were established in Joāo Pessoa in 1960, Maceió in 1966, and Fortaleza and Campina Grande in 1968. Though missionaries in the north did not have as high of a baptism rate as the south, missionaries in the north tended to baptize people with higher education and economic status. Therefore, finding church members to serve in ecclesiastical leadership positions was not as difficult for missionaries in the north.

Spencer W. Kimball organized Brazil's first stake on May 1, 1966, in São Paulo with Walter Spät as president. This was the first stake in all of South America. Kimball had spent a lot of time visiting Brazil since 1959, and his experiences there made him aware of the doctrinal, administrative, and personal consequences related to priesthood restrictions. In 1967, the policy on race and the priesthood was changed such that dark skinned people were presumed eligible for the priesthood by default unless there was specific evidence of African descent. Starting in the 70s "lineage lessons" were added to determine that interested persons didn't have any Sub-Saharan African ancestry and thus deemed eligible for teaching. In March 1975, Kimball announced the LDS Church's intentions to construct a temple in São Paulo. Since priesthood ordination in males and lack of African ancestry in females were requirements to enter an LDS temple, the announcement led to questions and concerns about the current LDS Church policies on priesthood. Furthermore, Brazil was so racially mixed, it would be difficult to determine the eligibility of members to enter the temple without chance of error. James E. Faust, a general authority over Brazil, advocated for the "faithfulness" of black church members, as they had labored and financially provided for the temple as other church members had. Several other general authorities acknowledged the virtues of black church members in Brazil. In March 1978, a change of policies allowed black males as a junior companion in home teaching, a position previously restricted to priesthood holders.

In October 1977, a Missionary Training Center (MTC) was established in São Paulo, mainly for the training for missionaries from Brazil. Bangerter and members of the Church Educational System provided daily instruction for the missionaries. Following the MTC in Provo, Utah, it was the LDS Church's second MTC. In June 1978, the 1978 Revelation on Priesthood was announced, allowing all worthy male members of the LDS Church to be ordained to the priesthood, regardless of race. Later, in 1978, the São Paulo Temple was completed. It was the first temple in Brazil and in South America. Some scholars suggest that the opening of the temple in São Paulo may have influenced the church's decision to reverse the ban on men of African descent from holding the priesthood, due to difficulty in determining racial origins of many Brazilian church members.(See main article.) After the opening of the temple in Brazil, missionary training in the MTC was increased from three to five days. Missionaries from other South American countries began to train in the Brazil MTC. In 1997, the Brazilian MTC moved to Casa Verde. The Casa Verde MTC was seven stories. After the 1978 Revelation on Priesthood, Marcus Martins, from Brazil, became the first missionary of African descent to be called after the announcement, postponing his marriage to serve his mission. As a result of the Revelation on Priesthood, proselyting in Brazil was expanded three-fold with missionaries sent to large cities in North Brazil after 1980, indicating that missionary work was no longer reserved for Europeans in South Brazil.

=== Recent developments ===
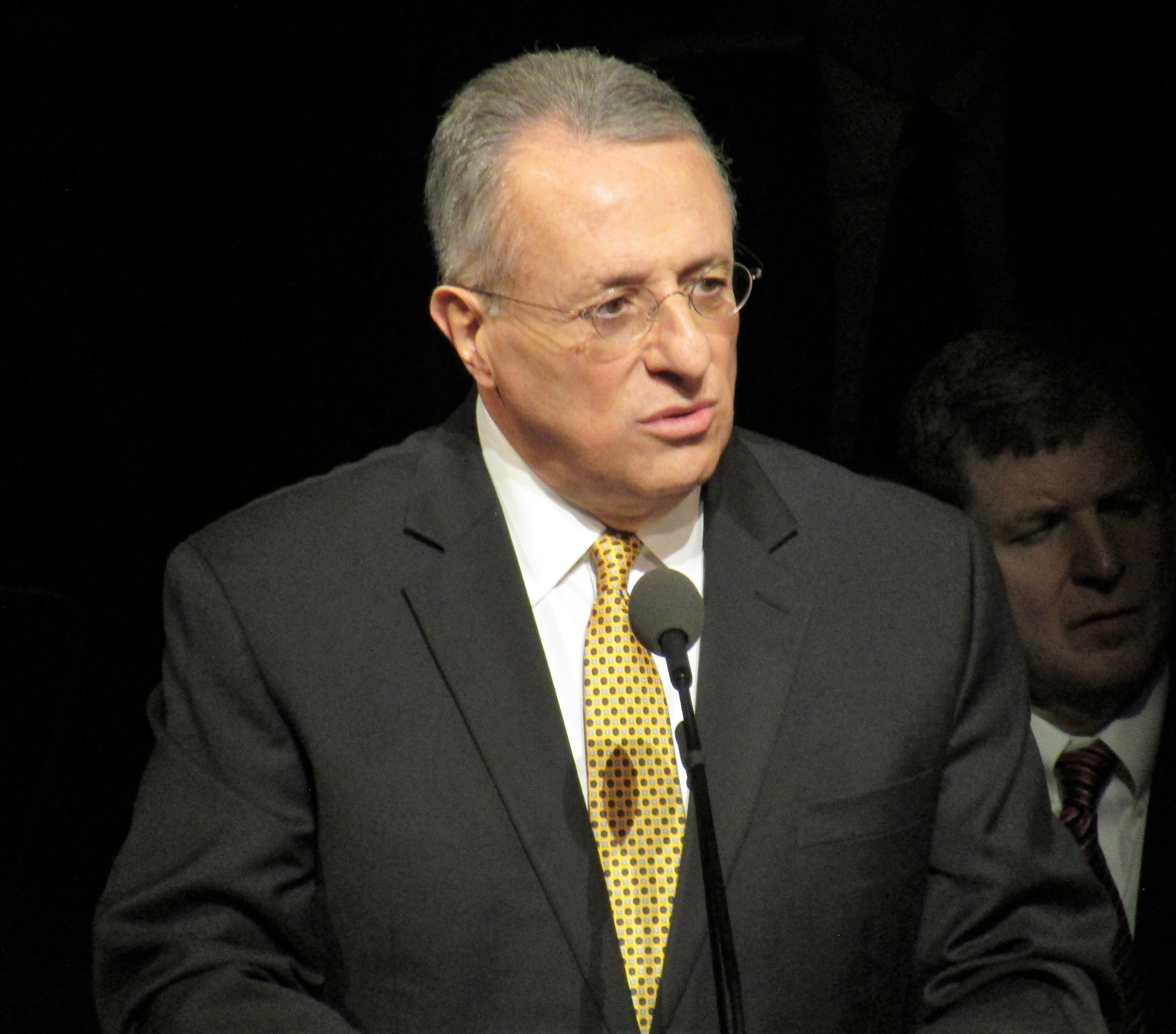
On March 31, 2018, Ulisses Soares, from São Paulo, became the first Latin American called as a member of the Quorum of the Twelve Apostles.

Brazil represents one of the countries in Latin America in which the LDS Church has experienced the most significant growth. Although its growth has been consistent for much of its history, growth accelerated significantly in 1984. This acceleration was partially due to the political and psychological effects of the end of Brazil's military dictatorship in 1985. Growth has slowed since mid-1990, yet the LDS Church experienced a 15 percent growth in Brazil from 1993 to 2003, over twice the growth of the LDS Church in Mexico. On March 31, 1990, Brazilian native, Helvécio Martins, father of Marcus, became the LDS Church's first general authority of African descent. Reactions were mixed. Many were happy, believing that this event signified change and a new paradigm for the LDS Church. LDS Church leaders attempted to minimize the event, stating that his race was not involved in the calling. Some believed the LDS Church appointed Martins to counteract previous accusations of racism from the media. In 1993, Brazil became the third country to have 100 stakes. In 2002, the São Paulo Brazil Temple was closed and renovated; one of the most prominent additions was the gold angel Moroni statue on top of the spire. Brazil's fifth temple in Curitiba began construction in March 2005. As of 2009, there were 234 stakes and 27 missions in Brazil.

On March 31, 2018, Ulisses Soares, from São Paulo, became the first Latin American called as a member of the Quorum of the Twelve Apostles.

=== Obstacles to missionary work ===
One challenge to LDS missionary work in Brazil is related to the strong ties between Brazilian culture and Catholicism. In Brazil, Catholicism is greatly tied to being Brazilian, meaning that changing religions is seen as rejecting family, history, and country. Furthermore, scholars have postulated that low densities of missionaries serving in lower-developed countries such as Brazil have limited the potential growth of the LDS Church in these countries. For example, a 1993 issue of Ensign stated that one-fifth of cities in Brazil with a population larger than 100,000 did not have missionaries serving in their city and with a large suburb of 2 million people only having two active missionaries serving there. Despite the high number of baptisms per year in Brazil, member retention can be low. For example, from 2000 to 2002, the LDS Church in Brazil had 66,000 baptisms, yet lost 190 congregations due to consolidation, representing the challenge that missionaries face in retaining Latin American converts. Additionally, in the 2000 census, 199,645 Brazilian residents identified with the LDS Church, whereas there were 700,000 people that had been baptized and listed in its membership rolls.

== Stakes and districts ==
Stake/District	Organized	Mission	Temple	State
Alegrete Brazil Stake	20 Sep 1981	Brazil Santa Maria	Porto Alegre Brazil	Rio Grande do Sul
Alphaville Brazil Stake	17 Oct 2010	Brazil São Paulo North	São Paulo Brazil	São Paulo
Alvarenga Brazil Stake	21 Nov 2010	Brazil São Paulo South	São Paulo Brazil	São Paulo
Americana Brazil Stake	25 Jun 1995	Brazil Piracicaba	Campinas Brazil	São Paulo
Ananindeua Brazil Stake	12 Dec 2010	Brazil Belém	Belém Brazil	Pará
Anápolis Brazil Stake	29 Jun 1997	Brazil Goiânia	Brasília Brazil	Goiás
Apucarana Brazil Stake	6 Jul 1997	Brazil Londrina	Curitiba Brazil	Paraná
Aracaju Brazil North Stake	23 Jul 1995	Brazil Maceió	Salvador Brazil	Sergipe
Aracaju Brazil South Stake	8 Mar 1992	Brazil Maceió	Salvador Brazil	Sergipe
Araçatuba Brazil Stake	14 Jun 1992	Brazil Ribeirão Preto	Campinas Brazil	São Paulo
Arapiraca Brazil Stake	17 Sep 1995	Brazil Maceió	Recife Brazil	Alagoas
Araraquara Brazil Stake	22 Oct 1978	Brazil Ribeirão Preto	Campinas Brazil	São Paulo
Araripina Brazil District	24 Feb 2019	Brazil Recife South	Fortaleza Brazil Temple	Pernambuco
Arsenal Brazil Stake	18 Oct 2009	Brazil Rio de Janeiro North	Rio de Janeiro Brazil	Rio de Janeiro
Bacabal Brazil District	16 Jun 2024	Brazil Teresina	Belém Brazil	Maranhão
Barcarena Brazil District	16 Apr 1997	Brazil Belém	Belém Brazil	Pará
Barreiras Brazil District	27 Sep 2015	Brazil Brasília	Brasília Brazil	Bahia
Barueri Brazil Stake	26 Oct 1997	Brazil São Paulo North	São Paulo Brazil	São Paulo
Bauru Brazil Stake	2 Aug 1992	Brazil Piracicaba	Campinas Brazil	São Paulo
Bauru Brazil Jardim Santana Stake	8 Mar 2026	Brazil Piracicaba	Campinas Brazil	São Paulo
Belém Brazil Cabanagem Stake	25 Jun 1995	Brazil Belém	Belém Brazil	Pará
Belém Brazil Cidade Nova Stake	22 Jun 1997	Brazil Belém	Belém Brazil	Pará
Belém Brazil Icoaraci Stake	12 Dec 2010	Brazil Belém	Belém Brazil	Pará
Belém Brazil Stake	29 Dec 1991	Brazil Belém	Belém Brazil	Pará
Belo Horizonte Brazil East Stake	15 Feb 2009	Brazil Belo Horizonte	Belo Horizonte Brazil	Minas Gerais
Belo Horizonte Brazil Pampulha Stake	3 Sep 2000	Brazil Belo Horizonte	Belo Horizonte Brazil	Minas Gerais
Belo Horizonte Brazil Stake	15 Feb 1981	Brazil Belo Horizonte	Belo Horizonte Brazil	Minas Gerais
Belo Horizonte Brazil West Stake	12 Dec 1993	Brazil Belo Horizonte	Belo Horizonte Brazil	Minas Gerais
Bento Gonçalves Brazil Stake	15 Dec 2024	Brazil Porto Alegre North	Porto Alegre Brazil	Rio Grande do Sul
Betim Brazil Stake	29 Sep 2013	Brazil Belo Horizonte	Belo Horizonte Brazil	Minas Gerais
Birigüi Brazil Stake	9 Jul 1995	Brazil Ribeirão Preto	Campinas Brazil	São Paulo
Boa Vista Brazil Stake	3 Sep 1995	Brazil Manaus North	Manaus Brazil	Roraima
Brasília Brazil Alvorada Stake	9 Jan 1983	Brazil Brasília	Brasília Brazil	Distrito Federal
Brasília Brazil Ceilândia Stake	17 Sep 2006	Brazil Brasília	Brasília Brazil	Distrito Federal
Brasília Brazil North Stake	30 Nov 1997	Brazil Brasília	Brasília Brazil	Distrito Federal
Brasília Brazil Stake	12 Oct 1980	Brazil Brasília	Brasília Brazil	Distrito Federal
Brasília Brazil Taguatinga Stake	17 Dec 1995	Brazil Brasília	Brasília Brazil	Distrito Federal
Caicó Brazil Stake	17 Jun 2007	Brazil Natal	Recife Brazil	Rio Grande do Norte
Camaçari Brazil Central Stake	8 Mar 2009	Brazil Salvador	Salvador Brazil	Bahia
Camaçari Brazil Stake	5 Aug 2001	Brazil Salvador	Salvador Brazil	Bahia
Camaragibe Brazil Stake	24 Jul 1994	Brazil Recife North	Recife Brazil	Pernambuco
Campina Grande Brazil Liberdade Stake	12 Mar 2006	Brazil João Pessoa	Recife Brazil	Paraíba
Campina Grande Brazil Stake	18 Sep 1983	Brazil João Pessoa	Recife Brazil	Paraíba
Campinas Brazil Bandeirantes Stake	30 Oct 2005	Brazil Campinas	Campinas Brazil	São Paulo
Campinas Brazil Castelo Stake	2 Feb 1986	Brazil Campinas	Campinas Brazil	São Paulo
Campinas Brazil Flamboyant Stake	23 Aug 1992	Brazil Campinas	Campinas Brazil	São Paulo
Campinas Brazil Stake	9 Jun 1973	Brazil Campinas	Campinas Brazil	São Paulo
Campo Grande Brazil Monte Líbano Stake	13 Sep 2009	Brazil Cuiabá	Campinas Brazil	Mato Grosso do Sul
Campo Grande Brazil Stake	30 Jun 1991	Brazil Cuiabá	Campinas Brazil	Mato Grosso do Sul
Campo Maior Brazil District	2 May 2021	Brazil Teresina	Fortaleza Brazil Temple	Piauí
Campo Mourão Brazil District	16 Oct 2016	Brazil Londrina	Curitiba Brazil	Paraná
Campos Brazil Stake	23 Nov 1997	Brazil Vitória	Rio de Janeiro Brazil	Rio de Janeiro
Canoas Brazil North Stake	30 Nov 2008	Brazil Porto Alegre North	Porto Alegre Brazil	Rio Grande do Sul
Canoas Brazil Stake	5 Dec 1993	Brazil Porto Alegre North	Porto Alegre Brazil	Rio Grande do Sul
Capão da Canoa Brazil District	24 Mar 1996	Brazil Porto Alegre North	Porto Alegre Brazil	Rio Grande do Sul
Carajás Brazil District	29 Nov 2015	Brazil Belém	Belém Brazil	Pará
Carapicuiba Brazil Stake	14 Nov 2021	Brazil São Paulo West	São Paulo Brazil	São Paulo
Cariacica Brazil Stake	13 Mar 2005	Brazil Vitória	Belo Horizonte Brazil	Espírito Santo
Caruaru Brazil Stake	18 May 2008	Brazil Recife South	Recife Brazil	Pernambuco
Cascavel Brazil Stake	20 Apr 1997	Brazil Londrina	Curitiba Brazil	Paraná
Castanhal Brazil Stake	26 Oct 1997	Brazil Belém	Belém Brazil	Pará
Caucaia Brazil Stake	18 Nov 2007	Brazil Fortaleza	Fortaleza Brazil Temple	Ceará
Caxias do Sul Brazil Stake	5 Dec 1993	Brazil Porto Alegre North	Porto Alegre Brazil	Rio Grande do Sul
Chapecó Brazil Stake	1 Jul 1990	Brazil Florianópolis	Curitiba Brazil	Santa Catarina
Colatina Brazil District	21 Jun 1993	Brazil Vitória	Belo Horizonte Brazil	Espírito Santo
Colombo Brazil Stake	15 Dec 2024	Brazil Curitiba	Curitiba Brazil	Paraná
Contagem Brazil Stake	6 Jun 1993	Brazil Belo Horizonte	Belo Horizonte Brazil	Minas Gerais
Cotia Brazil Stake	6 Sep 2009	Brazil São Paulo West	São Paulo Brazil	São Paulo
Criciúma Brazil Stake	19 Dec 1993	Brazil Florianópolis	Porto Alegre Brazil	Santa Catarina
Cruz Alta Brazil Stake	29 Feb 2004	Brazil Santa Maria	Porto Alegre Brazil	Rio Grande do Sul
Cuiabá Brazil Industriário Stake	3 May 2009	Brazil Cuiabá	Campinas Brazil	Mato Grosso
Cuiabá Brazil Stake	5 Mar 1995	Brazil Cuiabá	Campinas Brazil	Mato Grosso
Curitiba Brazil Boa Vista Stake	22 Mar 1998	Brazil Curitiba	Curitiba Brazil	Paraná
Curitiba Brazil Boqueirão Stake	15 Mar 1981	Brazil Curitiba South	Curitiba Brazil	Paraná
Curitiba Brazil Campo Comprido Stake	16 Jul 2023	Brazil Curitiba	Curitiba Brazil	Paraná
Curitiba Brazil Iguaçu Stake	29 Apr 1984	Brazil Curitiba	Curitiba Brazil	Paraná
Curitiba Brazil Jardim do Sol Stake	12 Aug 2007	Brazil Curitiba South	Curitiba Brazil	Paraná
Curitiba Brazil Luz Stake	8 Feb 1998	Brazil Curitiba South	Curitiba Brazil	Paraná
Curitiba Brazil Novo Mundo Stake	20 Feb 1994	Brazil Curitiba South	Curitiba Brazil	Paraná
Curitiba Brazil Portão Stake	26 Feb 1978	Brazil Curitiba South	Curitiba Brazil	Paraná
Curitiba Brazil São Lourenço Stake	1 Nov 1981	Brazil Curitiba	Curitiba Brazil	Paraná
Curitiba Brazil Stake	12 Sep 1971	Brazil Curitiba	Curitiba Brazil	Paraná
Curitiba Brazil Tarumã Stake	9 Jul 1995	Brazil Curitiba	Curitiba Brazil	Paraná
Diadema Brazil Stake	20 Oct 1996	Brazil São Paulo South	São Paulo Brazil	São Paulo
Duque de Caxias Brazil Stake	20 May 1979	Brazil Rio de Janeiro North	Rio de Janeiro Brazil	Rio de Janeiro
Embu das Artes Brazil Stake	4 Mar 2007	Brazil São Paulo Interlagos	São Paulo Brazil	São Paulo
Feira de Santana Brazil Kalilândia Stake	5 Aug 2001	Brazil Feira de Santana	Salvador Brazil	Bahia
Feira de Santana Brazil North Stake	18 Nov 2018	Brazil Feira de Santana	Salvador Brazil	Bahia
Feira de Santana Brazil Stake	15 Sep 1996	Brazil Feira de Santana	Salvador Brazil	Bahia
Florianópolis Brazil Stake	2 Nov 1985	Brazil Florianópolis	Curitiba Brazil	Santa Catarina
Fortaleza Brazil Benfica Stake	12 Dec 2010	Brazil Fortaleza	Fortaleza Brazil Temple	Ceará
Fortaleza Brazil Bom Jardim Stake	17 Sep 2006	Brazil Fortaleza	Fortaleza Brazil Temple	Ceará
Fortaleza Brazil Bom Sucesso Stake	17 Nov 1991	Brazil Fortaleza East	Fortaleza Brazil Temple	Ceará
Fortaleza Brazil Castelão Stake	28 Jun 2009	Brazil Fortaleza East	Fortaleza Brazil Temple	Ceará
Fortaleza Brazil Ceará Stake	2 May 1993	Brazil Fortaleza	Fortaleza Brazil Temple	Ceará
Fortaleza Brazil Dunas Stake	10 Jun 2018	Brazil Fortaleza	Fortaleza Brazil Temple	Ceará
Fortaleza Brazil East Stake	4 Sep 2005	Brazil Fortaleza East	Fortaleza Brazil Temple	Ceará
Fortaleza Brazil Lisboa Stake	25 Aug 2019	Brazil Fortaleza	Fortaleza Brazil Temple	Ceará
Fortaleza Brazil Litoral Stake	22 Jun 1997	Brazil Fortaleza	Fortaleza Brazil Temple	Ceará
Fortaleza Brazil Messejana Stake	7 Dec 2008	Brazil Fortaleza East	Fortaleza Brazil Temple	Ceará
Fortaleza Brazil Montese Stake	13 Nov 1983	Brazil Fortaleza	Fortaleza Brazil Temple	Ceará
Fortaleza Brazil South Stake	17 Aug 1997	Brazil Fortaleza East	Fortaleza Brazil Temple	Ceará
Fortaleza Brazil Stake	19 Jul 1981	Brazil Fortaleza	Fortaleza Brazil Temple	Ceará
Fortaleza Brazil West Stake	24 Nov 1985	Brazil Fortaleza	Fortaleza Brazil Temple	Ceará
Foz do Iguaçu Brazil Stake	26 Nov 2017	Brazil Londrina	Asunción Paraguay	Paraná
Franca Brazil Stake	5 Sep 1993	Brazil Ribeirão Preto	Campinas Brazil	São Paulo
Garanhuns Brazil Stake	21 May 1995	Brazil Recife South	Recife Brazil	Pernambuco
Goiânia Brazil North Stake	15 Dec 1996	Brazil Goiânia	Brasília Brazil	Goiás
Goiânia Brazil South Stake	21 Sep 2014	Brazil Goiânia	Brasília Brazil	Goiás
Goiânia Brazil Stake	24 May 1987	Brazil Goiânia	Brasília Brazil	Goiás
Gramado Brazil Stake	20 Mar 2005	Brazil Porto Alegre North	Porto Alegre Brazil	Rio Grande do Sul
Gravataí Brazil Stake	10 Dec 1995	Brazil Porto Alegre North	Porto Alegre Brazil	Rio Grande do Sul
Guarapuava Brazil District	26 Apr 1992	Brazil Curitiba South	Curitiba Brazil	Paraná
Guaratinguetá Brazil Stake	23 Feb 1997	Brazil Guarulhos	Campinas Brazil	São Paulo
Guarujá Brazil Stake	18 Aug 1996	Brazil Santos	São Paulo Brazil	São Paulo
Guarulhos Brazil Stake	24 May 1992	Brazil Guarulhos	São Paulo Brazil	São Paulo
Guarulhos Cumbica Brazil Stake	11 Mar 2007	Brazil Guarulhos	São Paulo Brazil	São Paulo
Hortolândia Brazil Stake	28 Jan 2007	Brazil Piracicaba	Campinas Brazil	São Paulo
Imperatriz Brazil Stake	30 Nov 2008	Brazil Teresina	Belém Brazil	Maranhão
Ipatinga Brazil Stake	1 Jan 1991	Brazil Belo Horizonte	Belo Horizonte Brazil	Minas Gerais
Itabuna Brazil Stake	27 Oct 1996	Brazil Feira de Santana	Salvador Brazil	Bahia
Itacoatiara Brazil Stake	14 Dec 2025	Brazil Manaus North	Manaus Brazil	Amazonas
Itapeva Brazil District	1 Dec 2002	Brazil Sorocaba	Campinas Brazil	São Paulo
Itatiba Brazil Stake	21 Jun 1998	Brazil Campinas	Campinas Brazil	São Paulo
Itu Brazil Stake	20 Apr 1997	Brazil Sorocaba	Campinas Brazil	São Paulo
Jaboatão Brazil Litoral Stake	15 May 1994	Brazil Recife South	Recife Brazil	Pernambuco
Jaboatão dos Guararapes Brazil Stake	26 Jul 1992	Brazil Recife South	Recife Brazil	Pernambuco
Jaraguá do Sul Brazil Stake	16 Jul 2023	Brazil Florianópolis	Curitiba Brazil	Santa Catarina
Ji-Paraná Brazil District	23 Jun 2024	Brazil Manaus South	Manaus Brazil	Rondônia
João Pessoa Brazil Centro Stake	6 Nov 2016	Brazil João Pessoa	Recife Brazil	Paraíba
João Pessoa Brazil Rangel Stake	23 Aug 1992	Brazil João Pessoa	Recife Brazil	Paraíba
João Pessoa Brazil Stake	2 Nov 1980	Brazil João Pessoa	Recife Brazil	Paraíba
João Pessoa Brazil Torre Stake	24 Jun 2007	Brazil João Pessoa	Recife Brazil	Paraíba
Joinville Brazil North Stake	21 Apr 1982	Brazil Florianópolis	Curitiba Brazil	Santa Catarina
Joinville Brazil South Stake	16 Mar 2014	Brazil Florianópolis	Curitiba Brazil	Santa Catarina
Juazeiro do Norte Brazil Stake	1 May 2005	Brazil Fortaleza East	Fortaleza Brazil Temple	Ceará
Juiz de Fora Brazil Stake	24 Nov 1996	Brazil Juiz de Fora	Rio de Janeiro Brazil	Minas Gerais
Jundiaí Brazil Represa Stake	19 Jun 2005	Brazil Campinas	Campinas Brazil	São Paulo
Jundiaí Brazil Stake	19 Jun 2005	Brazil Campinas	Campinas Brazil	São Paulo
Lafaiete Brazil Stake	8 Sep 1996	Brazil Juiz de Fora	Belo Horizonte Brazil	Minas Gerais
Lagarto Brazil District	10 Oct 2004	Brazil Maceió	Salvador Brazil	Sergipe
Lages Brazil Stake	27 Oct 1996	Brazil Florianópolis	Curitiba Brazil	Santa Catarina
Leopoldina Brazil District	15 Mar 2015	Brazil Juiz de Fora	Rio de Janeiro Brazil	Minas Gerais
Livramento Brazil Stake	27 Oct 1991	Brazil Santa Maria	Porto Alegre Brazil	Rio Grande do Sul
Londrina Brazil Stake	11 Nov 1979	Brazil Londrina	Curitiba Brazil	Paraná
Londrina Brazil Tiradentes Stake	20 Oct 1996	Brazil Londrina	Curitiba Brazil	Paraná
Macaé Brazil Stake	30 Oct 1994	Brazil Rio de Janeiro North	Rio de Janeiro Brazil	Rio de Janeiro
Macapá Brazil Stake	1 Apr 1993	Brazil Belém	Belém Brazil	Amapá
Maceió Brazil Colina Stake	24 Jan 2016	Brazil Maceió	Recife Brazil	Alagoas
Maceió Brazil Litoral Stake	7 Feb 1993	Brazil Maceió	Recife Brazil	Alagoas
Maceió Brazil Pajuçara Stake	5 Mar 1995	Brazil Maceió	Recife Brazil	Alagoas
Maceió Brazil Stake	21 Jan 1982	Brazil Maceió	Recife Brazil	Alagoas
Maceió Brazil Tabuleiro Stake	9 Dec 2007	Brazil Maceió	Recife Brazil	Alagoas
Mamanguape Brazil District	6 Jul 2008	Brazil João Pessoa	Recife Brazil	Paraíba
Manaus Brazil Cidade Nova Stake	5 Nov 1995	Brazil Manaus North	Manaus Brazil	Amazonas
Manaus Brazil Guarani Stake	4 Nov 2012	Brazil Manaus North	Manaus Brazil	Amazonas
Manaus Brazil Mindu Stake	5 Mar 2006	Brazil Manaus North	Manaus Brazil	Amazonas
Manaus Brazil Ponta Negra Stake	16 Mar 2007	Brazil Manaus South	Manaus Brazil	Amazonas
Manaus Brazil Rio Amazonas Stake	22 Mar 1998	Brazil Manaus South	Manaus Brazil	Amazonas
Manaus Brazil Rio Negro Stake	30 May 1993	Brazil Manaus North	Manaus Brazil	Amazonas
Manaus Brazil Samaúma Stake	27 Nov 2005	Brazil Manaus North	Manaus Brazil	Amazonas
Manaus Brazil Solimões Stake	16 Mar 1997	Brazil Manaus North	Manaus Brazil	Amazonas
Manaus Brazil Stake	16 Oct 1988	Brazil Manaus South	Manaus Brazil	Amazonas
Maracanaú Brazil North Stake	20 Mar 2016	Brazil Fortaleza East	Fortaleza Brazil Temple	Ceará
Maracanaú Brazil Stake	17 Dec 1995	Brazil Fortaleza East	Fortaleza Brazil Temple	Ceará
Marília Brazil Stake	23 Oct 1983	Brazil Londrina	Campinas Brazil	São Paulo
Maringá Brazil Stake	27 Aug 1995	Brazil Londrina	Curitiba Brazil	Paraná
Mauá Brazil Stake	28 Nov 2004	Brazil São Bernardo	São Paulo Brazil	São Paulo
Mogi Mirim Brazil Stake	25 Jun 1995	Brazil Campinas	Campinas Brazil	São Paulo
Montes Claros Brazil District	15 Jun 1997	Brazil Belo Horizonte	Belo Horizonte Brazil	Minas Gerais
Mossoró Brazil Stake	10 Dec 2006	Brazil Natal	Fortaleza Brazil Temple	Rio Grande do Norte
Nanuque Brazil District	21 Jun 1993	Brazil Vitória	Salvador Brazil	Minas Gerais
Natal Brazil Pajuçara Stake	3 Dec 2006	Brazil Natal	Recife Brazil	Rio Grande do Norte
Natal Brazil Ponta Negra Stake	26 Nov 2006	Brazil Natal	Recife Brazil	Rio Grande do Norte
Natal Brazil Potengi Stake	31 May 1998	Brazil Natal	Recife Brazil	Rio Grande do Norte
Natal Brazil Stake	16 Aug 1992	Brazil Natal	Recife Brazil	Rio Grande do Norte
Navegantes Brazil Stake	1 Nov 2020	Brazil Florianópolis	Curitiba Brazil	Santa Catarina
Niterói Brazil Stake	19 Sep 1976	Brazil Rio de Janeiro North	Rio de Janeiro Brazil	Rio de Janeiro
Nova Iguaçu Brazil Stake	16 Mar 1997	Brazil Rio de Janeiro South	Rio de Janeiro Brazil	Rio de Janeiro
Novo Hamburgo Brazil Stake	3 Dec 1978	Brazil Porto Alegre North	Porto Alegre Brazil	Rio Grande do Sul
Olinda Brazil Stake	12 Jul 1981	Brazil Recife North	Recife Brazil	Pernambuco
Osasco Brazil Stake	18 Apr 1993	Brazil São Paulo West	São Paulo Brazil	São Paulo
Pacajus Brazil Stake	12 Dec 2010	Brazil Fortaleza East	Fortaleza Brazil Temple	Ceará
Palhoça Brazil Stake	6 Jun 2021	Brazil Florianópolis	Curitiba Brazil	Santa Catarina
Palmares Brazil District	4 Jul 2004	Brazil Recife South	Recife Brazil	Pernambuco
Palmas Brazil North Stake	6 Dec 2020	Brazil Brasília	Brasília Brazil	Tocantins
Palmas Brazil Stake	2 Dec 2007	Brazil Brasília	Brasília Brazil	Tocantins
Paranaguá Brazil Stake	31 May 1998	Brazil Curitiba South	Curitiba Brazil	Paraná
Parnaíba Brazil District	25 Jan 2004	Brazil Teresina	Fortaleza Brazil Temple	Piauí
Passo Fundo Brazil South Stake	4 Sep 2016	Brazil Porto Alegre North	Porto Alegre Brazil	Rio Grande do Sul
Passo Fundo Brazil Stake	10 Aug 1986	Brazil Porto Alegre North	Porto Alegre Brazil	Rio Grande do Sul
Paulista Brazil Stake	5 Feb 1995	Brazil Recife North	Recife Brazil	Pernambuco
Pelotas Brazil North Stake	23 Jul 1995	Brazil Porto Alegre South	Porto Alegre Brazil	Rio Grande do Sul
Pelotas Brazil Stake	18 Oct 1987	Brazil Porto Alegre South	Porto Alegre Brazil	Rio Grande do Sul
Pelotas Brazil West Stake	31 Oct 1993	Brazil Porto Alegre South	Porto Alegre Brazil	Rio Grande do Sul
Petrolina Brazil Stake	21 Jun 1998	Brazil Feira de Santana	Salvador Brazil	Pernambuco
Petrópolis Brazil Stake	14 Nov 1982	Brazil Juiz de Fora	Rio de Janeiro Brazil	Rio de Janeiro
Pinhais Brazil Stake	9 Dec 2007	Brazil Curitiba	Curitiba Brazil	Paraná
Piracicaba Brazil Rezende Stake	13 Oct 2019	Brazil Piracicaba	Campinas Brazil	São Paulo
Piracicaba Brazil Stake	15 Jan 1995	Brazil Piracicaba	Campinas Brazil	São Paulo
Pirassununga Brazil Stake	11 Feb 2001	Brazil Piracicaba	Campinas Brazil	São Paulo
Ponta Grossa Brazil Campos Gerais Stake	30 Nov 1997	Brazil Curitiba	Curitiba Brazil	Paraná
Ponta Grossa Brazil North Stake	2 Jul 2023	Brazil Curitiba	Curitiba Brazil	Paraná
Ponta Grossa Brazil Stake	22 Sep 1980	Brazil Curitiba	Curitiba Brazil	Paraná
Ponta Porã Brazil Stake	14 Dec 1997	Brazil Cuiabá	Asunción Paraguay	Mato Grosso do Sul
Porto Alegre Brazil Moinhos de Vento Stake	10 May 1992	Brazil Porto Alegre South	Porto Alegre Brazil	Rio Grande do Sul
Porto Alegre Brazil North Stake	21 Apr 1981	Brazil Porto Alegre North	Porto Alegre Brazil	Rio Grande do Sul
Porto Alegre Brazil East Stake	5 May 1991	Brazil Porto Alegre South	Porto Alegre Brazil	Rio Grande do Sul
Porto Alegre Brazil South Stake	1 Dec 1996	Brazil Porto Alegre South	Porto Alegre Brazil	Rio Grande do Sul
Porto Alegre Brazil Stake	13 Feb 1973	Brazil Porto Alegre South	Porto Alegre Brazil	Rio Grande do Sul
Porto Seguro Brazil District	24 Oct 2010	Brazil Feira de Santana	Salvador Brazil	Bahia
Porto Velho Brazil Stake	8 Dec 1996	Brazil Manaus South	Manaus Brazil	Rondônia
Pouso Alegre Brazil District	24 Oct 2004	Brazil Campinas	Campinas Brazil	Minas Gerais
Praia Grande Brazil Stake	8 Feb 1998	Brazil Santos	São Paulo Brazil	São Paulo
Presidente Prudente Brazil District	21 Jun 1988	Brazil Londrina	Campinas Brazil	São Paulo
Recife Brazil Boa Viagem Stake	21 Mar 1982	Brazil Recife South	Recife Brazil	Pernambuco
Recife Brazil Casa Amarela Stake	3 Sep 2006	Brazil Recife North	Recife Brazil	Pernambuco
Recife Brazil Caxangá Stake	22 Jun 1997	Brazil Recife North	Recife Brazil	Pernambuco
Recife Brazil Imbiribeira Stake	3 Dec 1995	Brazil Recife South	Recife Brazil	Pernambuco
Recife Brazil Jardim São Paulo Stake	25 Aug 1991	Brazil Recife North	Recife Brazil	Pernambuco
Recife Brazil Stake	31 Oct 1980	Brazil Recife North	Recife Brazil	Pernambuco
Registro Brazil District	8 Feb 1998	Brazil Santos	Campinas Brazil	São Paulo
Ribeirão Pires Brazil Stake	13 Dec 1992	Brazil São Bernardo	São Paulo Brazil	São Paulo
Ribeirão Preto Brazil East Stake	28 Jun 1987	Brazil Ribeirão Preto	Campinas Brazil	São Paulo
Ribeirão Preto Brazil South Stake	9 Jun 2019	Brazil Ribeirão Preto	Campinas Brazil	São Paulo
Ribeirão Preto Brazil West Stake	21 Jun 1992	Brazil Ribeirão Preto	Campinas Brazil	São Paulo
Rio Branco Brazil Stake	3 Dec 1995	Brazil Manaus South	Manaus Brazil	Acre
Rio Claro Brazil Stake	21 May 1980	Brazil Piracicaba	Campinas Brazil	São Paulo
Rio de Janeiro Brazil Campo Grande Stake	15 Dec 1996	Brazil Rio de Janeiro South	Rio de Janeiro Brazil	Rio de Janeiro
Rio de Janeiro Brazil Engenho de Dentro Stake	19 Jun 2011	Brazil Rio de Janeiro North	Rio de Janeiro Brazil	Rio de Janeiro
Rio de Janeiro Brazil Itaguaí Stake	20 Mar 2005	Brazil Rio de Janeiro South	Rio de Janeiro Brazil	Rio de Janeiro
Rio de Janeiro Brazil Jacarepaguá Stake	22 Mar 1998	Brazil Rio de Janeiro South	Rio de Janeiro Brazil	Rio de Janeiro
Rio de Janeiro Brazil Madureira Stake	14 Nov 1982	Brazil Rio de Janeiro South	Rio de Janeiro Brazil	Rio de Janeiro
Rio de Janeiro Brazil Stake	22 Oct 1972	Brazil Rio de Janeiro North	Rio de Janeiro Brazil	Rio de Janeiro
Rio Grande Brazil Stake	23 Jul 1995	Brazil Porto Alegre South	Porto Alegre Brazil	Rio Grande do Sul
Rio Verde Brazil Stake	19 May 1997	Brazil Goiânia	Brasília Brazil	Goiás
Rondonópolis Brazil District	1 Jun 1997	Brazil Cuiabá	Campinas Brazil	Mato Grosso
Salvador Brazil Imbuí Stake	5 Mar 2006	Brazil Salvador	Salvador Brazil	Bahia
Salvador Brazil Liberdade Stake	15 Sep 2002	Brazil Salvador	Salvador Brazil	Bahia
Salvador Brazil North Stake	2 May 1993	Brazil Salvador	Salvador Brazil	Bahia
Salvador Brazil Stake	10 May 1992	Brazil Salvador	Salvador Brazil	Bahia
Santa Cruz do Sul Brazil Stake	25 Sep 1994	Brazil Porto Alegre North	Porto Alegre Brazil	Rio Grande do Sul
Santa Maria Brazil Stake	31 Jan 1993	Brazil Santa Maria	Porto Alegre Brazil	Rio Grande do Sul
Santa Maria Brazil West Stake	26 Jan 2025	Brazil Santa Maria	Porto Alegre Brazil	Rio Grande do Sul
Santa Rita Brazil Stake	1 Sep 1996	Brazil João Pessoa	Recife Brazil	Paraíba
Santarém Brazil Stake	12 Sep 2010	Brazil Belém	Manaus Brazil	Pará
Santo André Brazil Stake	23 May 1980	Brazil São Bernardo	São Paulo Brazil	São Paulo
Santo Ângelo Brazil Stake	1 Jun 1979	Brazil Santa Maria	Porto Alegre Brazil	Rio Grande do Sul
Santos Brazil Stake	8 Jun 1973	Brazil Santos	São Paulo Brazil	São Paulo
São Bernardo Brazil Rudge Ramos Stake	16 Aug 1998	Brazil São Bernardo	São Paulo Brazil	São Paulo
São Bernardo Brazil Stake	6 Sep 1970	Brazil São Bernardo	São Paulo Brazil	São Paulo
São Borja Brazil District	21 Oct 2001	Brazil Santa Maria	Porto Alegre Brazil	Rio Grande do Sul
São Carlos Brazil Stake	15 Nov 1992	Brazil Piracicaba	Campinas Brazil	São Paulo
São Jerônimo Brazil District	17 Nov 2013	Brazil Porto Alegre South	Porto Alegre Brazil	Rio Grande do Sul
São João da Boa Vista Brazil Stake	30 Jul 1995	Brazil Piracicaba	Campinas Brazil	São Paulo
São José Brazil Stake	19 Dec 1993	Brazil Florianópolis	Curitiba Brazil	Santa Catarina
São José do Rio Preto Brazil South Stake	16 Nov 2014	Brazil Ribeirão Preto	Campinas Brazil	São Paulo
São José do Rio Preto Brazil Stake	13 Dec 1992	Brazil Ribeirão Preto	Campinas Brazil	São Paulo
São José dos Campos Brazil South Stake	25 Nov 2018	Brazil Guarulhos	Campinas Brazil	São Paulo
São José dos Campos Brazil Stake	3 Mar 1985	Brazil Guarulhos	Campinas Brazil	São Paulo
São José dos Pinhais Brazil Jardim Ipê Stake	25 Feb 2018	Brazil Curitiba South	Curitiba Brazil	Paraná
São José dos Pinhais Brazil Stake	14 Sep 1997	Brazil Curitiba South	Curitiba Brazil	Paraná
São Leopoldo Brazil Stake	5 Dec 1993	Brazil Porto Alegre North	Porto Alegre Brazil	Rio Grande do Sul
São Luís Brazil East Stake	21 Aug 2016	Brazil Teresina	Belém Brazil	Maranhão
São Luís Brazil Stake	2 Jul 1995	Brazil Teresina	Belém Brazil	Maranhão
São Paulo Brazil Campo Limpo Stake	9 Feb 1992	Brazil São Paulo West	São Paulo Brazil	São Paulo
São Paulo Brazil Ferreira Stake	17 Apr 2011	Brazil São Paulo West	São Paulo Brazil	São Paulo
São Paulo Brazil Franco da Rocha Stake	23 Nov 2008	Brazil São Paulo North	São Paulo Brazil	São Paulo
São Paulo Brazil Grajaú Stake	8 Jun 1997	Brazil São Paulo Interlagos	São Paulo Brazil	São Paulo
São Paulo Brazil Guarapiranga Stake	1 Jun 1997	Brazil São Paulo Interlagos	São Paulo Brazil	São Paulo
São Paulo Brazil Interlagos Stake	26 May 1985	Brazil São Paulo Interlagos	São Paulo Brazil	São Paulo
São Paulo Brazil Ipiranga Stake	25 May 1980	Brazil São Paulo East	São Paulo Brazil	São Paulo
São Paulo Brazil Itaquá Stake	10 Jun 2007	Brazil Guarulhos	São Paulo Brazil	São Paulo
São Paulo Brazil Itaquera Stake	10 May 1992	Brazil São Paulo East	São Paulo Brazil	São Paulo
São Paulo Brazil Jaçanã Stake	2 Jun 1996	Brazil São Paulo North	São Paulo Brazil	São Paulo
São Paulo Brazil Jardim da Saúde Stake	16 Sep 2007	Brazil São Paulo South	São Paulo Brazil	São Paulo
São Paulo Brazil Mogi das Cruzes Stake	24 May 1992	Brazil Guarulhos	São Paulo Brazil	São Paulo
São Paulo Brazil North Stake	20 Feb 1977	Brazil São Paulo North	São Paulo Brazil	São Paulo
São Paulo Brazil Parelheiros Stake	7 Dec 2008	Brazil São Paulo Interlagos	São Paulo Brazil	São Paulo
São Paulo Brazil Parque Bristol Stake	14 Sep 1997	Brazil São Paulo South	São Paulo Brazil	São Paulo
São Paulo Brazil Parque Pinheiros Stake	9 Mar 1997	Brazil São Paulo Interlagos	São Paulo Brazil	São Paulo
São Paulo Brazil Penha Stake	24 Nov 1968	Brazil São Paulo East	São Paulo Brazil	São Paulo
São Paulo Brazil Perdizes Stake	25 May 1980	Brazil São Paulo West	São Paulo Brazil	São Paulo
São Paulo Brazil Pirituba Stake	25 May 1997	Brazil São Paulo North	São Paulo Brazil	São Paulo
São Paulo Brazil Raposo Tavares Stake	16 Jul 1995	Brazil São Paulo West	São Paulo Brazil	São Paulo
São Paulo Brazil Sabará Stake	6 Dec 1992	Brazil São Paulo South	São Paulo Brazil	São Paulo
São Paulo Brazil Santo Amaro Stake	12 Nov 1979	Brazil São Paulo Interlagos	São Paulo Brazil	São Paulo
São Paulo Brazil São Miguel Paulista Stake	10 Nov 1991	Brazil São Paulo East	São Paulo Brazil	São Paulo
São Paulo Brazil Sapopemba Stake	27 Oct 2019	Brazil São Paulo East	São Paulo Brazil	São Paulo
São Paulo Brazil South Stake	10 Jun 1973	Brazil São Paulo South	São Paulo Brazil	São Paulo
São Paulo Brazil Stake	1 May 1966	Brazil São Paulo West	São Paulo Brazil	São Paulo
São Paulo Brazil Taboão Stake	18 Sep 1983	Brazil São Paulo West	São Paulo Brazil	São Paulo
São Sebastião Brazil District	19 Nov 1995	Brazil Santos	Campinas Brazil	São Paulo
São Vicente Brazil Serra do Mar Stake	11 Feb 2007	Brazil Santos	São Paulo Brazil	São Paulo
São Vicente Brazil Stake	20 Sep 1981	Brazil Santos	São Paulo Brazil	São Paulo
Sete Lagoas Brazil East Stake	20 Sep 2015	Brazil Belo Horizonte	Belo Horizonte Brazil	Minas Gerais
Sete Lagoas Brazil Stake	17 May 1998	Brazil Belo Horizonte	Belo Horizonte Brazil	Minas Gerais
Sobral Brazil Stake	6 Aug 2006	Brazil Fortaleza	Fortaleza Brazil Temple	Ceará
Sorocaba Brazil Barcelona Stake	26 Jul 1992	Brazil Sorocaba	Campinas Brazil	São Paulo
Sorocaba Brazil Santana Stake	17 Oct 2004	Brazil Sorocaba	Campinas Brazil	São Paulo
Sorocaba Brazil Stake	10 Dec 1978	Brazil Sorocaba	Campinas Brazil	São Paulo
Sorocaba Brazil Trujilo Stake	17 Dec 1995	Brazil Sorocaba	Campinas Brazil	São Paulo
Sorriso Brazil District	25 Jul 2010	Brazil Cuiabá	Campinas Brazil	Mato Grosso
Sumaré Brazil Stake	23 Jan 2011	Brazil Piracicaba	Campinas Brazil	São Paulo
Teresina Brazil Horto Stake	23 Apr 2006	Brazil Teresina	Fortaleza Brazil Temple	Piauí
Teresina Brazil Planalto Stake	20 Nov 2016	Brazil Teresina	Fortaleza Brazil Temple	Piauí
Teresina Brazil Stake	28 Nov 1993	Brazil Teresina	Fortaleza Brazil Temple	Piauí
Teresópolis Brazil Stake	8 Mar 1998	Brazil Juiz de Fora	Rio de Janeiro Brazil	Rio de Janeiro
Três Corações Brazil District	22 Jun 1997	Brazil Juiz de Fora	Campinas Brazil	Minas Gerais
Tubarão Brazil District	14 Sep 2025	Brazil Florianópolis	Porto Alegre Brazil	Santa Catarina
Uberaba Brazil Stake	16 Aug 1998	Brazil Goiânia	Campinas Brazil	Minas Gerais
Uberlândia Brazil Stake	29 Jan 1995	Brazil Goiânia	Brasília Brazil	Minas Gerais
União da Vitória Brazil District	30 Apr 1995	Brazil Curitiba South	Curitiba Brazil	Paraná
Uruguaiana Brazil Stake	29 Nov 1992	Brazil Santa Maria	Porto Alegre Brazil	Rio Grande do Sul
Vale do Itajaí Brazil Stake	20 Oct 1996	Brazil Florianópolis	Curitiba Brazil	Santa Catarina
Valparaíso Brazil Stake	14 Jun 2015	Brazil Brasília	Brasília Brazil	Goiás
Viamão Brazil Stake	10 Sep 2017	Brazil Porto Alegre South	Porto Alegre Brazil	Rio Grande do Sul
Vila Velha Brazil Stake	27 Aug 1995	Brazil Vitória	Belo Horizonte Brazil	Espírito Santo
Vitória Brazil Stake	15 Feb 1987	Brazil Vitória	Belo Horizonte Brazil	Espírito Santo
Vitória da Conquista Brazil Stake	15 Jun 1997	Brazil Feira de Santana	Salvador Brazil	Bahia
Volta Redonda Brazil Stake	1 Jun 1997	Brazil Juiz de Fora	Rio de Janeiro Brazil	Rio de Janeiro

== Missions ==
Mission	Organized
Brazil Belém Mission	1 July 1994
Brazil Belo Horizonte Mission	1 July 1988
Brazil Brasília Mission	1 July 1985
Brazil Campinas Mission	1 July 1986
Brazil Cuiabá Mission	1 July 2006
Brazil Curitiba Mission	1 July 1980
Brazil Curitiba South Mission	1 July 2013
Brazil Feira de Santana Mission	1 July 1990
Brazil Florianópolis Mission	1 July 1993
Brazil Fortaleza Mission	1 July 1987
Brazil Fortaleza East Mission	1 July 2013
Brazil Goiânia Mission	1 July 1998
Brazil Guarulhos Mission	1 July 2026
Brazil João Pessoa Mission	1 July 1998
Brazil Juiz de Fora Mission	1 July 2013
Brazil Londrina Mission	1 July 1995
Brazil Maceió Mission	1 July 1993
Brazil Manaus North Mission	1 July 1990
Brazil Manaus South Mission	1 July 2024
Brazil Natal Mission	1 July 2013
Brazil Piracicaba Mission	1 July 2013
Brazil Porto Alegre North Mission	1 July 1991
Brazil Porto Alegre South Mission	20 Sep 1959
Brazil Recife North Mission	1 July 1979
Brazil Recife South Mission	13 Aug 2020
Brazil Ribeirão Preto Mission	1 Feb 1993
Brazil Rio de Janeiro North Mission	7 July 1968
Brazil Rio de Janeiro South Mission	28 June 2018
Brazil Salvador Mission	1 July 1994
Brazil Santa Maria Mission	1 July 1998
Brazil Santos Mission	1 July 2013
Brazil São Bernardo Mission	1 July 2026
Brazil São Paulo East Mission	1 July 1991
Brazil São Paulo West Mission	1 July 2013
Brazil São Paulo Interlagos Mission	1 July 1991
Brazil São Paulo North Mission	25 May 1935
Brazil São Paulo South Mission	17 Oct 1972
Brazil Sorocaba Mission	1 July 2026
Brazil Teresina Mission	1 July 2009
Brazil Vitória Mission	1 July 1993

== Temples ==

Temples in Brazil

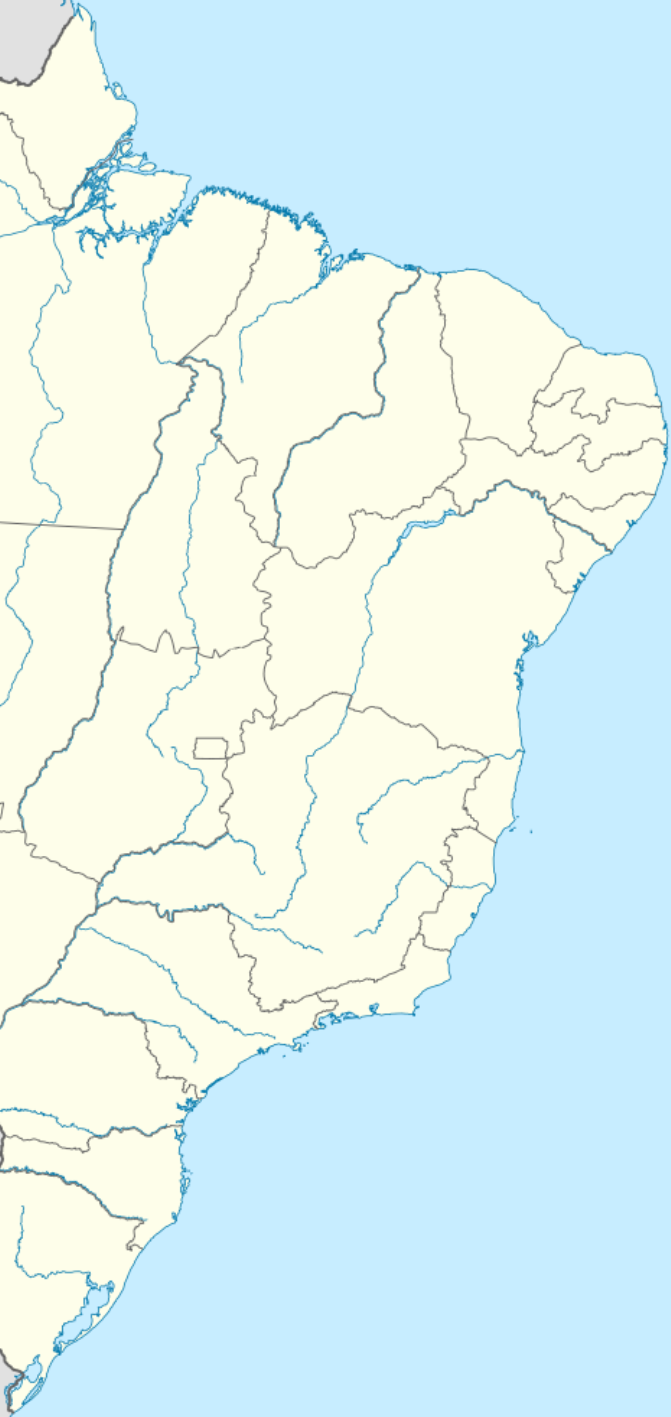

Temples in Eastern Brazil

Temples in the State of São Paulo, Brazil

- = Operating
- = Under construction
- = Announced
- = Temporarily Closed

=== Dedicated ===
17. São Paulo Brazil Temple; Official website; News & images	
Location: Announced: Groundbreaking: Dedicated: Rededicated: Size: Style:	São Paulo, Brazil; 1 March 1975 by Spencer W. Kimball; 20 March 1976 by James E. Faust; 30 October 1978 by Spencer W. Kimball; 22 February 2004 by Gordon B. Hinckley; 59,246 sq ft (5,504.1 m^{2}) on a 1.85-acre (0.75 ha) site Spanish influenced modern, single-spire design - designed by Emil B. Fetzer
101. Recife Brazil Temple; Official website; News & images	
Location: Announced: Groundbreaking: Dedicated: Size: Style:	Recife, Brazil; 13 January 1995 by Howard W. Hunter; 11 November 1996 by Gordon B. Hinckley; 15 December 2000 by Gordon B. Hinckley; 37,200 sq ft (3,460 m^{2}) on a 5.59-acre (2.26 ha) site Classic modern, single-spire design - designed by Jerônimo da Cunha Lima (J&P Arquitetos Ltda.) and Church A&E Services
102. Porto Alegre Brazil Temple; Official website; News & images	
Location: Announced: Groundbreaking: Dedicated: Size: Style:	Porto Alegre, Brazil; 30 September 1997 by Gordon B. Hinckley; 2 May 1998 by James E. Faust; 17 December 2000 by Gordon B. Hinckley; 10,700 sq ft (990 m^{2}) on a 2-acre (0.81 ha) site Classic modern, single-spire design - designed by Andre Belo de Faria and Church A&E Services
111. Campinas Brazil Temple; Official website; News & images	
Location: Announced: Groundbreaking: Dedicated: Size: Style:	Campinas, Brazil; 3 April 1997 by Gordon B. Hinckley; 1 May 1998 by James E. Faust; 17 May 2002 by Gordon B. Hinckley; 49,100 sq ft (4,560 m^{2}) on a 6.18-acre (2.50 ha) site Classic modern, single-spire design - designed by JCL Arquitetos Ltd., and Church A&E Services
126. Curitiba Brazil Temple; Official website; News & images	
Location: Announced: Groundbreaking: Dedicated: Size: Style:	Curitiba, Brazil; 23 August 2002 by Gordon B. Hinckley; 10 March 2005 by Russell M. Nelson; 1 June 2008 by Thomas S. Monson; 27,850 sq ft (2,587 m^{2}) on a 8.15-acre (3.30 ha) site Classic modern, single-spire design - designed by Jeronimo da Cunha Lima and GSBS
138. Manaus Brazil Temple; Official website; News & images	
Location: Announced: Groundbreaking: Dedicated: Size: Notes:	Manaus, Brazil; 23 May 2007 by Gordon B. Hinckley; 20 June 2008 by Charles A. Didier; 10 June 2012 by Dieter F. Uchtdorf; 32,032 sq ft (2,975.9 m^{2}) on a 7.7-acre (3.1 ha) site The temple will serve approximately 44,000 members.
164. Fortaleza Brazil Temple; Official website; News & images	
Location: Announced: Groundbreaking: Dedicated: Size:	Fortaleza, Brazil; 3 October 2009 by Thomas S. Monson; 15 November 2011 by David A. Bednar; 2 June 2019 by Ulisses Soares; 36,000 sq ft (3,300 m^{2}) on a 10-acre (4.0 ha) site
171. Rio de Janeiro Brazil Temple; Official website; News & images	
Location: Announced: Groundbreaking: Dedicated: Size:	Rio de Janeiro, Brazil; 6 April 2013 by Thomas S. Monson; 4 March 2017 by Claudio R. M. Costa; 8 May 2022 by Gary E. Stevenson; 29,966 sq ft (2,783.9 m^{2}) on a 9.44-acre (3.82 ha) site
174. Belém Brazil Temple; Official website; News & images	
Location: Announced: Groundbreaking: Dedicated: Size:	Belém, Brazil; 3 April 2016 by Thomas S. Monson; 17 August 2019 by Marcos A. Aidukaitis; 20 November 2022 by Dale G. Renlund; 28,675 sq ft (2,664.0 m^{2}) on a 6.7-acre (2.7 ha) site
180. Brasília Brazil Temple; Official website; News & images	
Location: Announced: Groundbreaking: Dedicated: Size:	Brasília, Brazil; 2 April 2017 by Thomas S. Monson; 26 September 2020 by Adilson de Paula Parrella; 17 September 2023 by Neil L. Andersen; 25,000 sq ft (2,300 m^{2}) on a 6-acre (2.4 ha) site
199. Salvador Brazil Temple; Official website; News & images	
Location: Announced: Groundbreaking: Dedicated: Size:	Salvador, Brazil; 7 October 2018 by Russell M. Nelson; 7 August 2021 by Adilson de Paula Parrella; 20 October 2024 by Neil L. Andersen; 29,963 sq ft (2,783.7 m^{2}) on a 4.6-acre (1.9 ha) site
220. Belo Horizonte Brazil Temple; Official website; News & images	
Location: Announced: Groundbreaking: Dedicated: Size:	Belo Horizonte, Brazil; 4 April 2021 by Russell M. Nelson; 17 June 2023 by Juan A. Uceda; 16 August 2026 by Dallin H. Oaks; 28,686 sq ft (2,665.0 m^{2}) on a 6.029-acre (2.440 ha) site

=== Under construction ===
247. Ribeirão Preto Brazil Temple (Under construction); Official website; News & images	
Location: Announced: Groundbreaking: Size: Notes:	Ribeirão Preto, Brazil; 2 October 2022 by Russell M. Nelson; 22 June 2024 by Joni L. Koch; 32,000 sq ft (3,000 m^{2}) on a 8.77-acre (3.55 ha) site Site announced on November 20, 2023.
248. Londrina Brazil Temple (Under construction); Official website; News & images	
Location: Announced: Groundbreaking: Size:	Londrina, Brazil; 2 October 2022 by Russell M. Nelson; 17 August 2024 by Ciro Schmiel; 32,000 sq ft (3,000 m^{2}) on a 6.23-acre (2.52 ha) site
260. Natal Brazil Temple (Under construction); Official website; News & images	
Location: Announced: Groundbreaking: Size:	Parnamirim, Brazil; 2 April 2023 by Russell M. Nelson; 17 May 2025 by Mark D. Eddy; 19,800 sq ft (1,840 m^{2}) on a 5.53-acre (2.24 ha) site
275. João Pessoa Brazil Temple (Under construction); Official website; News & images	
Location: Announced: Groundbreaking: Size:	João Pessoa, Brazil; 1 October 2023 by Russell M. Nelson; 24 January 2026 by Joni L. Koch; 18,850 sq ft (1,751 m^{2}) on a 3.9-acre (1.6 ha) site
278. Teresina Brazil Temple (Under construction); Official website; News & images	
Location: Announced: Groundbreaking: Size:	Teresina, Brazil; 2 April 2023 by Russell M. Nelson; 18 April 2026 by Ciro Schmeil; 25,420 sq ft (2,362 m^{2}) on a 3.6-acre (1.5 ha) site
281. Santos Brazil Temple (Under construction); Official website; News & images	
Location: Announced: Groundbreaking: Size:	Santos, Brazil; 3 April 2022 by Russell M. Nelson; 1 August 2026 by Ronald M. Barcellos; 23,000 sq ft (2,100 m^{2}) on a 1.1-acre (0.45 ha) site

=== Announced ===
290. Maceió Brazil Temple (Under construction); Official website; News & images	
Location: Announced: Groundbreaking: Size:	Maceió, Brazil; 3 April 2022 by Russell M. Nelson; 10 October 2026 by B. Corey Cuvelier; 19,000 sq ft (1,800 m^{2}) on a 3-acre (1.2 ha) site
302. São Paulo East Brazil Temple (Site announced); Official website; News & images	
Location: Announced: Size:	São Paulo, Brazil; 4 October 2020 by Russell M. Nelson; 46,050 sq ft (4,278 m^{2}) on a 10.7-acre (4.3 ha) site
308. Vitória Brazil Temple (Site announced); Official website; News & images	
Location: Announced: Size:	Vitória, Brazil; 3 October 2021 by Russell M. Nelson; 10,600 sq ft (980 m^{2}) on a 0.75-acre (0.30 ha) site
331. Goiânia Brazil Temple (Site announced); Official website; News & images	
Location: Announced: Size:	Goiânia, Brazil; 1 October 2023 by Russell M. Nelson; 18,850 sq ft (1,751 m^{2}) on a 5.54-acre (2.24 ha) site
341. Florianópolis Brazil Temple (Site announced); Official website; News & images	
Location: Announced:	Florianópolis, Brazil; 7 April 2024 by Russell M. Nelson on a 5.5-acre (2.2 ha) site
371. Campo Grande Brazil Temple (Site announced); Official website; News & images	
Location: Announced: Size:	Campo Grande, Brazil; 6 April 2025 by Russell M. Nelson; 11,300 sq ft (1,050 m^{2}) on a 5.6-acre (2.3 ha) site

== See also ==
- Religion in Brazil
