= Rio de Janeiro Brazil Temple =

LDS Church temple in Rio de Janeiro, Brazil

- Interactive map of Rio de Janeiro Brazil Temple
- Number: 171
- Dedication: 8 May 2022, by Gary E. Stevenson
- Site: 9.44 acres (3.82 ha)
- Floor area: 29,966 ft^{2} (2,783.9 m^{2})
- Height: 155.4 ft (47.4 m)
- Official website • News & images

Church chronology
← Pocatello Idaho Temple	Rio de Janeiro Brazil Temple	→ Yigo Guam Temple

Additional information
- Announced: 6 April 2013, by Thomas S. Monson
- Groundbreaking: 4 March 2017, by Claudio R. M. Costa
- Open house: 26 March-30 April 2022
- Current president: Paulo Roberto Sant' Anna Mota
- Location: Rio de Janeiro, Brazil
- Coordinates: 23°00′03″S 43°24′01″W
- Baptistries: 1
- Ordinance rooms: 2
- Sealing rooms: 2

The Rio de Janeiro Brazil is a temple of the Church of Jesus Christ of Latter-day Saints (LDS Church) in Rio de Janeiro, Brazil. The intent to build the temple was announced on April 6, 2013, by church president Thomas S. Monson, during general conference. It is the eighth temple in Brazil.

The temple has a single attached end spire with a statue of the angel Moroni. This temple was designed by GSBS of Utah, and Modulor Arquitectura e Urbanismo of Brazil. A groundbreaking ceremony, to signify beginning of construction, was held on March 4, 2017, conducted by Claudio R.M. Costa, a church general authority.

== History ==
The intent to construct the temple was announced by church president Thomas S. Monson on April 6, 2013, during general conference, concurrently with the Cedar City Utah Temple. At the time, the announcement brought the total number of temples worldwide to 170.

On March 4, 2017, a groundbreaking ceremony to signify beginning of construction took place with Claudio R. M. Costa presiding. On February 12, 2020, the LDS Church announced that a public open house would be held from April 17 through May 2, 2020 with the dedication on May 17, 2020. Just over a month later, due to the COVID-19 pandemic, arrangements were postponed until large public gatherings were again permitted by the Brazilian government. On November 5, 2021, the church announced that a public open house would be held from March 26 through April 16, 2022. The temple was dedicated by Gary E. Stevenson of the Quorum of the Twelve, on May 8, 2022. With this dedication, it marked the first time in church history that all members of First Presidency and the Quorum of the Twelve had either dedicated or rededicated at least one temple.

== Design and architecture ==
The building’s architecture is inspired by other buildings in the Barra da Tijuca region, as well as traditional Latter-day Saint temple design. Designed by the architectural firms GSBS of Utah and Modulor Arquitectura e Urbanismo of Brazil, its architecture reflects the cultural heritage of the region and its spiritual significance to the church.

The temple is on a 9.44-acre plot, and the landscaping around the temple features trees, shrubs, vines, and flowering perennials, as well as walkways around the temple made of Brazilian granite, designed to provide a tranquil setting to enhances the sacred atmosphere of the site. A meetinghouse is also located on the site.

The structure stands 155 feet and five inches tall, constructed with Branco Ceará granite. This granite was also used for the Recife Brazil, Campinas Brazil, Fortaleza Brazil, and Trujillo Peru temples. The exterior has a symmetrical, Art-Deco inspired design that draws from the surrounding architecture in Barra da Tijuca. The exterior design “focuses on the entablature and window surroundings composed of carved stone representing the Art Deco arches motif.”

The interior features Art Deco-inspired design elements, including chandeliers and pendants. The interior design emphasizes simple clean lines, with stylized railings, carved millwork, and decorative art painting throughout. The interior art glass uses an Art Deco Fountain motif, with a color palette of blue, aqua, and purple inspired by the ocean near Rio de Janeiro.

The temple includes two instruction rooms, two sealing rooms, and one baptistry, each arranged for ceremonial use.

The design uses elements representing the heritage of Rio de Janeiro, to provide meaning to the temple's appearance and function. Symbolism is important to church members and includes the colors used for the art glass windows, which draw from the South Atlantic Ocean, and the Art Deco design elements and motifs represent the predominant architectural style in Barra da Tijuca–Rio de Janeiro “is considered the Art Deco Capital of South America.”

The church's temples are directed by a temple president and matron, each serving for a term of three years. The president and matron oversee the administration of temple operations and provide guidance and training for both temple patrons and staff. Serving since its 2022 dedication, Pedro J. Penha and Sonia T. Penha are the president and matron.

== Admittance ==
On November 5, 2021, the church announced the public open house that was held from March 26-April 30, 2022 (excluding Sundays). The temple was dedicated by Gary E. Stevenson on May 8, 2022, in three sessions.

Like all the church's temples, it is not used for Sunday worship services. To members of the church, temples are regarded as sacred houses of the Lord. Once dedicated, only church members with a current temple recommend can enter for worship.

== See also ==
- Comparison of temples of The Church of Jesus Christ of Latter-day Saints
- List of temples of The Church of Jesus Christ of Latter-day Saints
- List of temples of The Church of Jesus Christ of Latter-day Saints by geographic region
- Temple architecture (Latter-day Saints)
- The Church of Jesus Christ of Latter-day Saints in Brazil
