= Recife Brazil Temple =

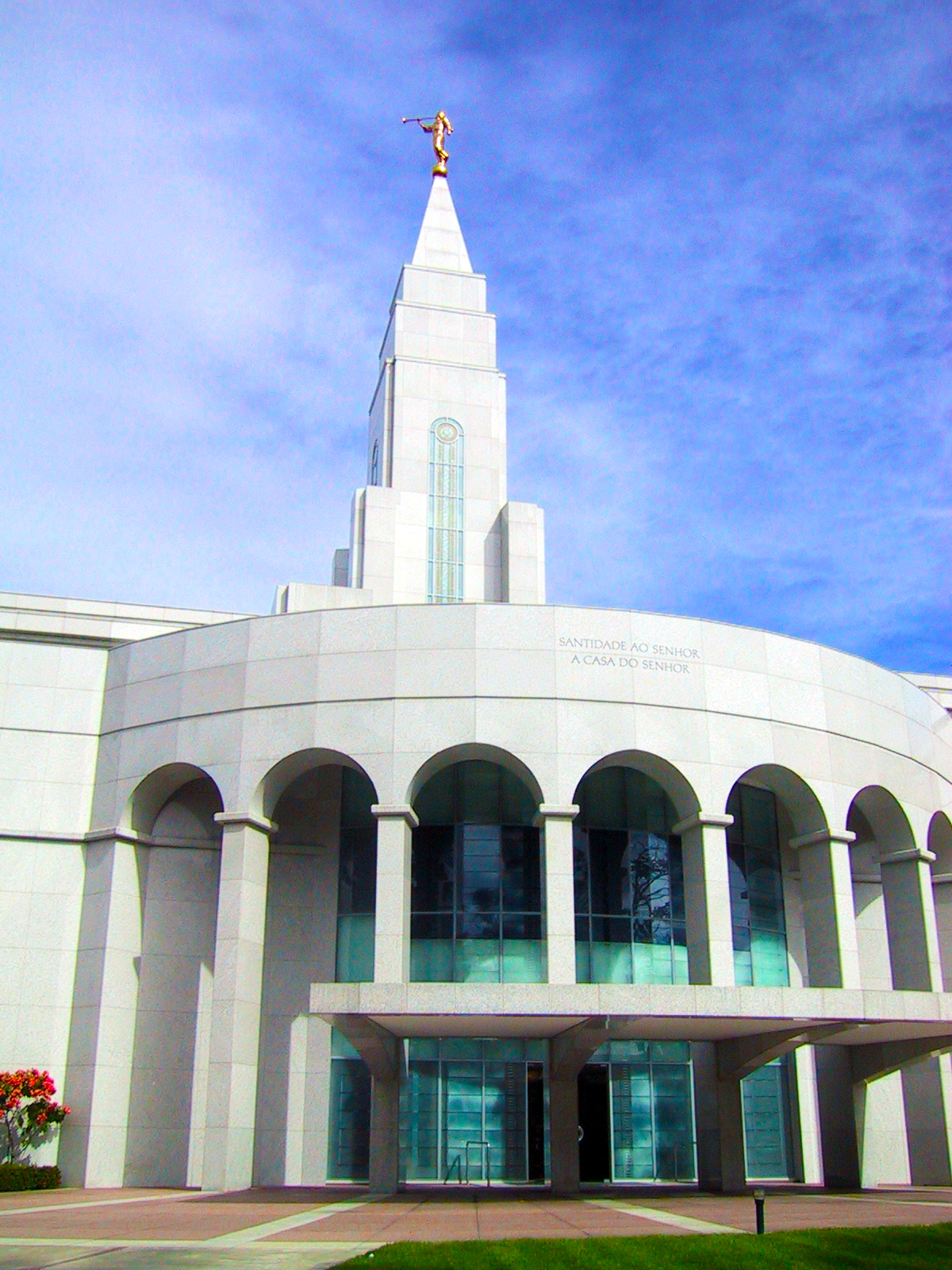
- Interactive map of Recife Brazil Temple
- Number: 101
- Dedication: 15 December 2000, by Gordon B. Hinckley
- Site: 5.59 acres (2.26 ha)
- Floor area: 37,200 ft^{2} (3,460 m^{2})
- Official website • News & images

Church chronology
← Boston Massachusetts Temple	Recife Brazil Temple	→ Porto Alegre Brazil Temple

Additional information
- Announced: 13 January 1995, by Howard W. Hunter
- Groundbreaking: 11 November 1996, by Gordon B. Hinckley
- Open house: 11 November – 2 December 2000
- Current president: Sergio L. Carboni
- Designed by: Jerônimo da Cunha Lima (J&P Arquitetos Ltda.) and Church A&E Services
- Location: Recife, Brazil
- Coordinates: 8°2′11.00400″S 34°54′40.04280″W
- Exterior finish: Asa branca granite from the Brazilian state of Ceara
- Design: Classic modern, single-spire design
- Baptistries: 1
- Ordinance rooms: 2 (stationary)
- Sealing rooms: 3
- Clothing rental: Yes

The Recife Brazil Temple is a temple of the Church of Jesus Christ of Latter-day Saints in Recife, Pernambuco, Brazil. The intent to build the temple was announced on January 13, 1995, by the First Presidency. It is the second in Brazil, the first in the state of Pernambuco, and was the church's 101st operating temple worldwide. It has a single spire with a gold statue of the angel Moroni on top, with an exterior of Asa Branca granite from the Brazilian state of Ceará. This temple was designed by J&P Arquitetos Ltd. in collaboration with church architectural personnel, using a classic modern architectural style. A groundbreaking ceremony, to signify the beginning of construction, was held on November 15, 1996, conducted by church president Gordon B. Hinckley, who later dedicated the temple on December 15, 2000. The temple required more than 1,000 pilings to create a stable foundation due to flooding concerns on the 5.59-acre site, which features 200-year-old palm trees and mango trees.

== History ==
The temple was announced by the First Presidency on January 13, 1995, to local leaders in the temple district. At the time of the announcement, members in northern Brazil were traveling up to 72 hours to reach the São Paulo Brazil Temple, which was the only temple in Brazil. The groundbreaking ceremony took place on November 15, 1996, and was presided over by church president Gordon B. Hinckley. During the ceremony, Hinckley emphasized the spiritual significance of the temple for members in northern Brazil and encouraged them to prepare themselves to enter once it was completed.

The temple was constructed on a 5.59-acre site located at Rua Dr. José de Góes in the Parnamirim neighborhood of Recife. The property was selected for its proximity to a busy highway and the presence of 200-year-old palm trees, which Hinckley described as "a tremendous asset to this property." The site initially appeared unsuitable for construction due to its susceptibility to flooding. To address this challenge, more than 1,000 pilings were driven into the land to create a stable foundation. Francisco D. Granja, president of the Recife Brazil Stake noted that the pilings, called "stakes" in Brazil, served as a reminder that strong ecclesiastical stakes were necessary to support the temple's operation.

Construction progressed ahead of schedule despite challenges, including heavy seasonal rains that could have delayed the project. After construction was complete, the church announced the public open house that was held from November 11 through December 2, 2000, where a reported 78,386 visitors toured the temple. Approximately 16,000 people toured the temple on the final day of the open house. Media representatives from three television stations, two newspapers, and a prominent national magazine covered the temple and open house.

The Recife Brazil Temple was dedicated in four sessions on December 15, 2000, by church president Hinckley. James E. Faust, second counselor in the First Presidency, joined him and conducted two of the dedicatory sessions.] More than 7,100 church members from northern Brazil attended the dedication despite a heavy rains. Some traveled more than 72 hours to be present, including those from northern Brazilian cities of Fortaleza, Maceió, Salvador, and Natal. Also in attendance were Claudio R.M. Costa, president of the Brazil North Area, and his counselors, Robert S. Wood and Darwin B. Christenson. During the cornerstone ceremony, approximately 100 youth sang while Hinckley thanked those who braved the rain to attend. It was the second built in Brazil, 22 years after completion of the São Paulo Brazil Temple. It became the church's 101st operating temple. Two days later, Hinckley dedicated the Porto Alegre Brazil Temple.

== Design and architecture ==
The Recife Brazil Temple was designed with a classic modern architectural style by J&P Arquitetos Ltd. in collaboration with church architectural personnel. Raul Lins was the project manager, and the temple was constructed by Hochtief do Brasil SA.

The temple is on a 5.59-acre plot in the Parnamirim neighborhood of Recife. The landscaping includes gardens, along with mango trees and 200-year-old royal palm trees that predate the temple's construction. It is adjacent to a busy highway, making the temple highly visible to passing traffic. The site also includes patron housing facilities and a distribution center.

The structure is 114 feet by 158 feet and totals 37,200 square feet. The exterior is Asa Branca granite from the state of Ceará in Brazil. The temple has a single attached central spire with a gold statue of the angel Moroni on its top. The temple has two instruction rooms, three sealing rooms, and a baptistry.

In 2020, like all the church's others, the Recife Brazil Temple was closed for a time in response to the COVID-19 pandemic.

== Temple leadership and admittance ==
The church's temples are directed by a temple president and matron, each typically serving for a term of three years. The president and matron oversee the administration of temple operations and provide guidance and training for both temple patrons and staff. Serving from 2000 to 2003, Joseph M. Heath was the first president, with Colleen W. Heath serving as matron. As of 2024, Sergio L. Carboni is the president, with Edite L. Carboni serving as matron.

=== Admittance ===
After construction was completed, the church announced the public open house that was held from November 11 through December 2, 2000. Like all the church's temples, it is not used for Sunday worship services. To members of the church, temples are regarded as sacred houses of the Lord. Once dedicated, only church members with a current temple recommend can enter for worship.

== See also ==
- Comparison of temples of The Church of Jesus Christ of Latter-day Saints
- List of temples of The Church of Jesus Christ of Latter-day Saints
- List of temples of The Church of Jesus Christ of Latter-day Saints by geographic region
- Temple architecture (Latter-day Saints)
- The Church of Jesus Christ of Latter-day Saints in Brazil
