= Winnipeg Manitoba Temple =

Latter-day Saint temple in Manitoba, Canada

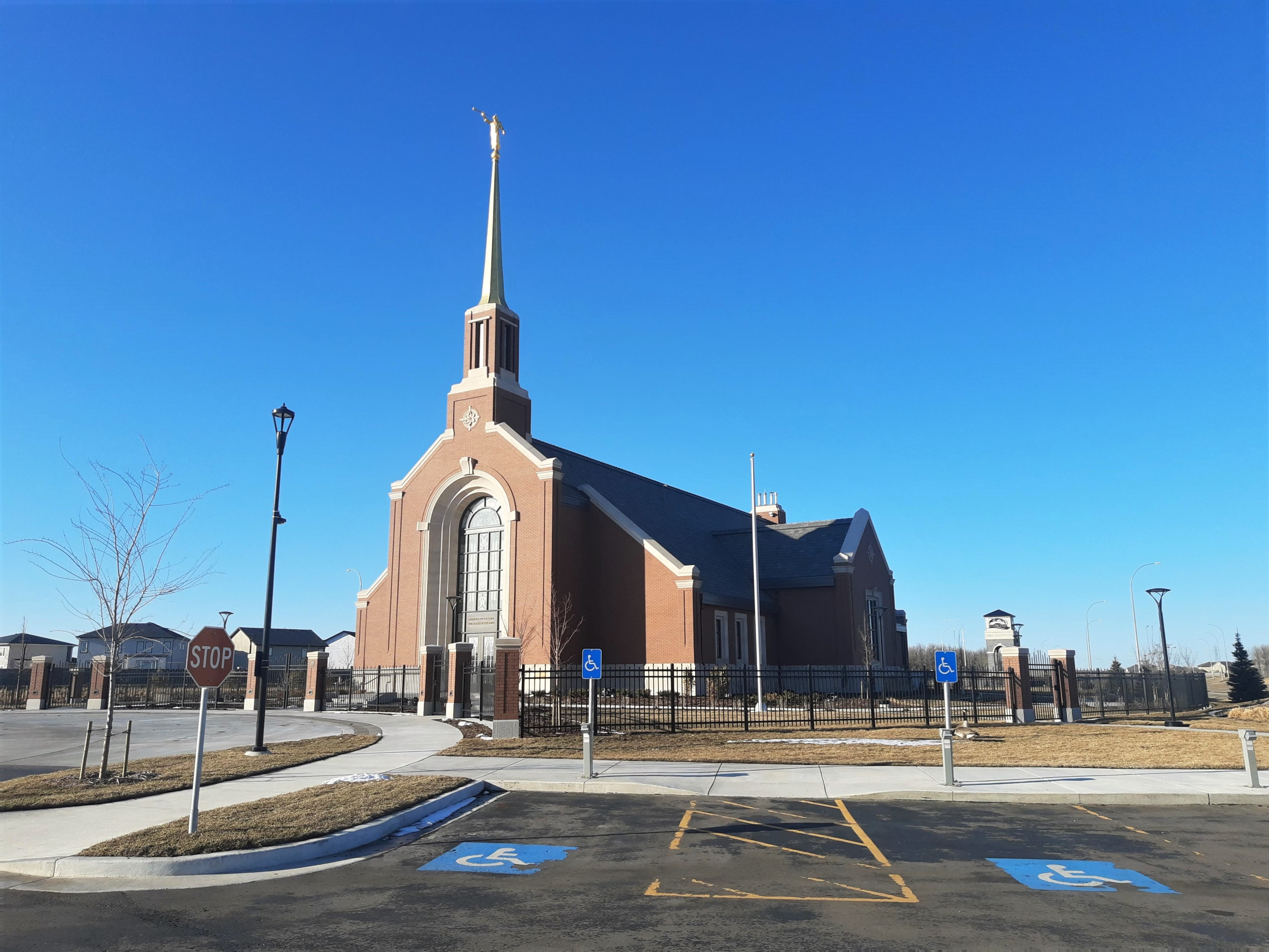
- Interactive map of Winnipeg Manitoba Temple
- Number: 169
- Dedication: 31 October 2021, by Gerrit W. Gong
- Site: 7.7 acres (3.1 ha)
- Floor area: 16,100 ft^{2} (1,500 m^{2})
- Height: 105 ft (32 m)
- Official website • News & images

Church chronology
← Durban South Africa Temple	Winnipeg Manitoba Temple	→ Pocatello Idaho Temple

Additional information
- Announced: April 2, 2011, by Thomas S. Monson
- Groundbreaking: December 3, 2016, by Larry Y. Wilson
- Open house: 9-23 October 2021
- Current president: Doug Englot
- Location: Winnipeg, Manitoba, Canada
- Coordinates: 49.8011°N 97.1946°W
- Baptistries: 1
- Ordinance rooms: 1
- Sealing rooms: 1
- Notes: Dedication originally scheduled for November 2020, but was postponed due to the COVID-19 pandemic. Revised arrangements were announced on August 30, 2021.

The Winnipeg Manitoba Temple is a temple of the Church of Jesus Christ of Latter-day Saints (LDS Church) in Winnipeg, Manitoba. The intent to build the temple was announced on April 2, 2011, by church president Thomas S. Monson, during general conference. The temple is the ninth to be built in Canada, the first in Manitoba, and the church’s 169th overall. A groundbreaking ceremony, to signify the beginning of construction, was held on December 3, 2016, conducted by Larry Y. Wilson, a church general authority.

The temple has a single attached end spire with a statue of the angel Moroni. This temple was designed by Jeremy Woolf of Abbarch Architecture, using a style inspired by small country churches.

== History ==
The intent to construct the temple was announced by church president Thomas S. Monson on April 2, 2011, during general conference. It is the ninth temple built in Canada and the first in Manitoba. On December 3, 2016, a groundbreaking ceremony to signify beginning of construction took place with Larry Y. Wilson, executive director of the church's Temple Department, presiding.

On April 30, 2020, the LDS Church announced that a public open house was scheduled from October 22 through 31, 2020, excluding Sunday October 25. A youth devotional was originally scheduled for November 7, 2020, with the dedication anticipated the next day, with Gerrit W. Gong, of the Quorum of the Twelve Apostles, assigned to preside at those events. Subsequently, on September 1, 2020, the temple's open house and dedication were postponed due to the COVID-19 pandemic, with revised opening dates to be set once large public gatherings are permitted by government officials. The temple was dedicated by Gong on October 31, 2021. It was the church’s first temple dedication in almost 20 months, due to the pandemic.

== Design and architecture ==
The building was inspired by “the concept of a little English country church”, along with traditional Latter-day Saint temple design. The temple has a cruciform plan, and inspiration was drawn from the Copenhagen Denmark Temple, as well as country churches in the United Kingdom, Canada, and the United States. Designed by Jeremy Woolf, its architecture reflects the heritage of the Manitoba region and its spiritual significance to the church.

The temple is on a 7.7-acre plot, and its landscaping features gardens with over 1,000 shrubs and 128 trees. These elements are designed to provide a tranquil setting that enhances the sacred atmosphere of the site. A distribution centre is also located on the site.

The structure is constructed with Park Rose red brick, and “is the first temple done with red brick that is not a remodel or a renovation.” The exterior has slate roof tiles and a copper steeple.

The interior has art glass, decorative painting, woodwork carving, and two original artworks. The interior design is centered on the prairie crocus, a Manitoban flower, and a color palette of soft purples, aqua, and green.

The temple includes one instruction room, one sealing room, and one baptistry, each designed for ceremonial use.

The design uses symbolic elements representing the heritage of the Manitoba region. Symbolism is important to church members and includes the prairie crocus flower motif found throughout the temple; the prairie crocus is a provincial flower of Manitoba and symbolizes “renewal after a difficult season,” because it is the first spring flower to bloom in Manitoba.

== Temple presidents ==
The church's temples are directed by a temple president and matron, each serving for a term of three years. The president and matron oversee the administration of temple operations and provide guidance and training for both temple patrons and staff. The first president and matron, serving from 2021 to 2024, were George L. Spencer Linda M. Spencer. As of 2024, Douglas T. Englot and Valerie A. Englot are the president and matron.

== Admittance ==
Upon the temple’s completion, the church announced the public open house that held from October 9-23, 2021 (excluding Sundays). The temple was dedicated by Gerrit W. Gong on October 31, 2021, in three sessions.

Like all the church's temples, it is not used for Sunday worship services. To members of the church, temples are regarded as sacred houses of the Lord. Once dedicated, only church members with a current temple recommend can enter for worship.

== See also ==

Temples in Canada

Alberta Temples
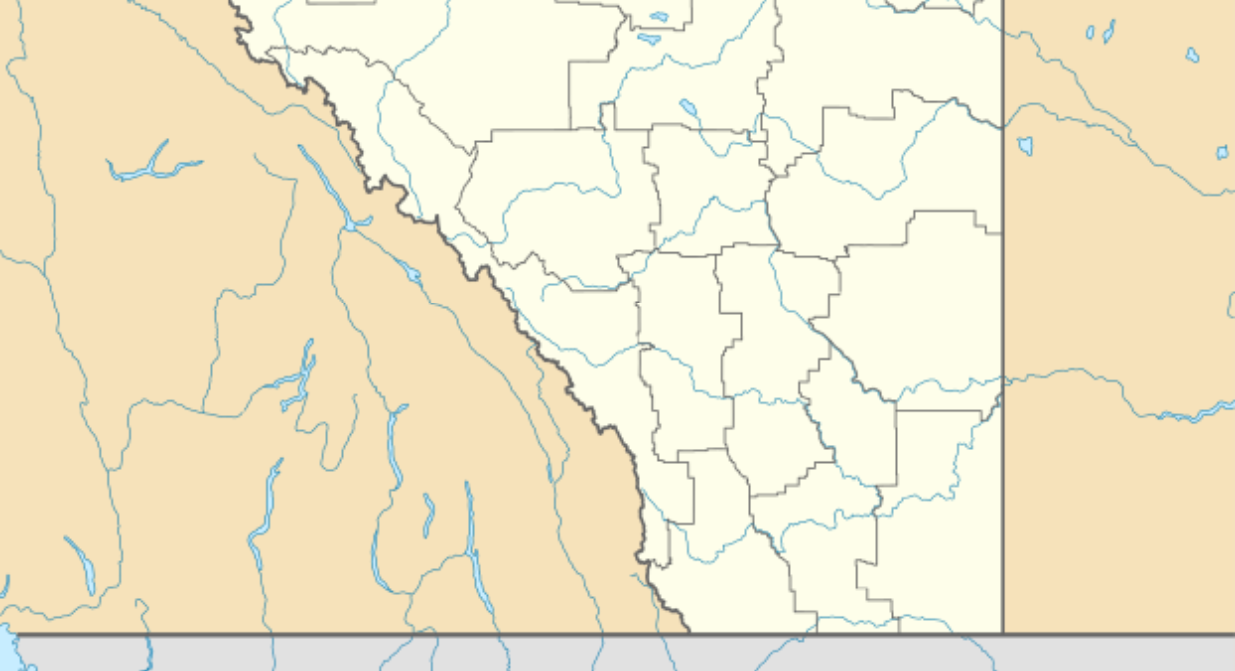
Temples in Alberta

= Operating
= Under construction
= Announced
= Temporarily Closed

- Comparison of temples of The Church of Jesus Christ of Latter-day Saints
- List of temples of The Church of Jesus Christ of Latter-day Saints
- List of temples of The Church of Jesus Christ of Latter-day Saints by geographic region
- Temple architecture (Latter-day Saints)
- The Church of Jesus Christ of Latter-day Saints in Canada
