= Helio R. Camargo =

Brazilian religious leader (1926–2024)

Hélio R. Camargo

First Quorum of the Seventy
- 6 April 1985 – 1 April 1989
- Called by: Spencer W. Kimball
- End reason: Transferred to Second Quorum of the Seventy

Second Quorum of the Seventy
- 1 April 1989 – 6 October 1990
- Called by: Ezra Taft Benson
- End reason: Honorably released

Personal details
- Born: Hélio da Rocha Camargo; 1 February 1926; Resende, Brazil
- Died: 19 July 2024 (aged 98)
- Spouse(s): Nair Belmira de Gouveia (m. 1948; died 2020)
- Children: 6

Helio da Rocha Camargo (1 February 1926 – 19 July 2024) was a Brazilian religious leader who served as the first Brazilian general authority of the Church of Jesus Christ of Latter-day Saints (LDS Church). He was called to the First Quorum of the Seventy in 1985 and served there for four years. In 1989, he was transferred, along with other limited-term members of the First Quorum of the Seventy to the newly created Second Quorum of the Seventy. Camargo was released as a general authority in 1990.

Camargo was born in Resende, state of Rio de Janeiro. He entered a military academy in 1943 and he advanced to the rank of captain in the Brazilian military before his retirement.

Camargo married Nair Belmira de Gouveia in 1948 and they had six children. They served together as president} and matron of the São Paulo Brazil Temple. She was also an area representative for the church's auxiliary boards.

After leaving the military, Camargo moved to São Paulo where he became a banker and also entered a Methodist seminary. Camargo was ordained a Methodist minister but was later expelled from the seminary because he opposed infant baptism. He was one of three ministers expelled at that point, the other two were Saul Messias de Oliveira and Walter Guedes de Queiroz, who also later joined the LDS Church.

Camargo read literature he had previously received from LDS Church missionaries and then started attending meetings of the church. His conversion was helped by hearing the testimony of a young lady on the power of the law of chastity. He was baptized in 1957.

Camargo served as the first president of the São Paulo East Stake when it was organized in November 1968.

Camargo also served as a bishop, counselor to a mission president, and as president of the Rio de Janeiro mission, which then covered all of Brazil north and north west of Rio de Janeiro. Among the missionaries who served under Camargo when he was mission president was Ulisses Soares, who would later become an apostle in the LDS Church.

Camargo's wife died in April 2020. He died on 19 July 2024, at the age of 98.

Camargo's son, Milton R. Camargo, was called as 1st counselor in the LDS Church's Sunday School General Presidency in 2019.
