= The Church of Jesus Christ of Latter-day Saints in Uruguay =

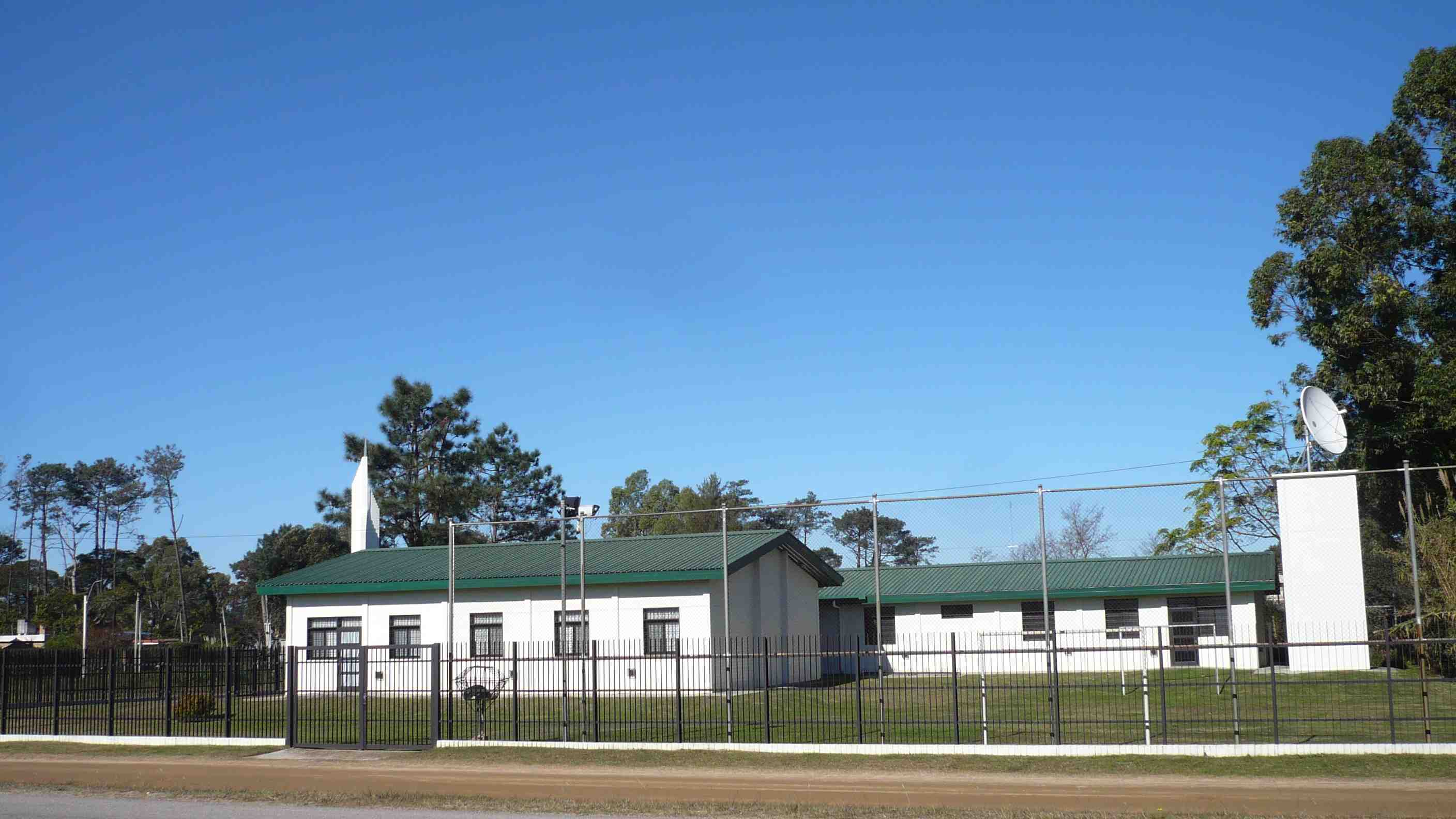
- A meetinghouse of the Church of Jesus Christ of Latter-day Saints in Pinamar–Pinepark, Canelones Department
- Area: South America South
- Members: 112,449 (2025)
- Stakes: 18
- Districts: 2
- Wards: 100
- Branches: 32
- Total Congregations: 132
- Missions: 2
- Temples: 1 operating
- FamilySearch Centers: 43

The Church of Jesus Christ of Latter-day Saints in Uruguay refers to the Church of Jesus Christ of Latter-day Saints (LDS Church) and its members in Uruguay. The first small branch was established in 1947. Since then, the LDS Church in Uruguay has grown to more than 100,000 members in 132 congregations. Uruguay has more LDS Church members per capita than the United States, as well as more members per capita than any country outside of Oceania and Chile.

== History ==
Membership in Uruguay
Year	Membership
1950	252
1960	2,555
1970	15,311
1979	25,892
1989*	49,000
1999	73,194
2009	92,117
2019	107,103
2025	112,449
*Membership was published as an estimate. Source: Wendall J. Ashton; Jim M. Wall, Deseret News, various years, Church Almanac Country Information: Uruguay

Montevideo was a stopping point for missionaries traveling to other areas as early as the 1920s. A branch was both formed then closed in 1944. The first permanent congregation was formed in Montevideo in late 1947. Uruguay's first stake was formed in 1967 in Montevideo.

== Stakes and Districts ==
As of July 2026, Uruguay had the following stakes and districts:

Stake	Organized	Mission
Artigas Uruguay Stake	23 Mar 1980	Uruguay Salto
Colonia Uruguay District	10 Aug 1989	Uruguay Montevideo West
De La Costa Uruguay Stake	11 Mar 2012	Uruguay Montevideo East
Durazno Uruguay Stake	25 Jan 1980	Uruguay Montevideo West
Florida Uruguay District	20 Aug 1989	Uruguay Montevideo West
Las Piedras Uruguay Stake	2 Jul 1995	Uruguay Montevideo West
Maldonado Uruguay Stake	15 Sep 1996	Uruguay Montevideo East
Melo Uruguay Stake	2 Jun 1979	Uruguay Montevideo East
Mercedes Uruguay Stake	20 Jun 1993	Uruguay Salto
Montevideo Uruguay Cerro Stake	2 Sep 1979	Uruguay Montevideo West
Montevideo Uruguay East Stake	17 Feb 1974	Uruguay Montevideo East
Montevideo Uruguay Flores Stake	17 Nov 1996	Uruguay Montevideo East
Montevideo Uruguay Maroñas Stake	3 Jun 1979	Uruguay Montevideo East
Montevideo Uruguay North Stake	12 Feb 1978	Uruguay Montevideo West
Montevideo Uruguay West Stake	12 Nov 1967	Uruguay Montevideo West
Paysandu Uruguay Stake	21 May 1977	Uruguay Salto
Rivera Uruguay Stake	20 May 1977	Uruguay Salto
Salto Uruguay Stake	22 Apr 1979	Uruguay Salto
Tacuarembó Uruguay Stake	22 Jun 2003	Uruguay Salto
Treinta y Tres Uruguay Stake	4 Feb 1990	Uruguay Montevideo East

== Missions ==
Mission	Organized
Uruguay Montevideo	31 Aug 1947
Uruguay Montevideo West	1 Jul 1997
Uruguay Salto	1 Jul 2026

== Temples ==
Temples in Uruguay
Red = Operating
Blue = Under Construction
Yellow = announced
Black = Closed for Renovations

103. Montevideo Uruguay Temple; Official website; News & images	
Location: Announced: Groundbreaking: Dedicated: Size: Style:	Montevideo, Uruguay; 2 November 1998 by Gordon B. Hinckley; 27 April 1999 by Richard G. Scott; 18 March 2001 by Gordon B. Hinckley; 10,700 sq ft (990 m^{2}) on a 1.59-acre (0.64 ha) site Classic modern, single-spire design - designed by Edvardo Signorelli
370. Rivera Uruguay Temple (Announced); Official website; News & images	
Location: Announced:	Rivera, Uruguay; 6 April 2025 by Russell M. Nelson

== See also ==
- Religion in Uruguay
