= Montevideo Uruguay Temple =

LDS Church temple in Montevideo, Uruguay

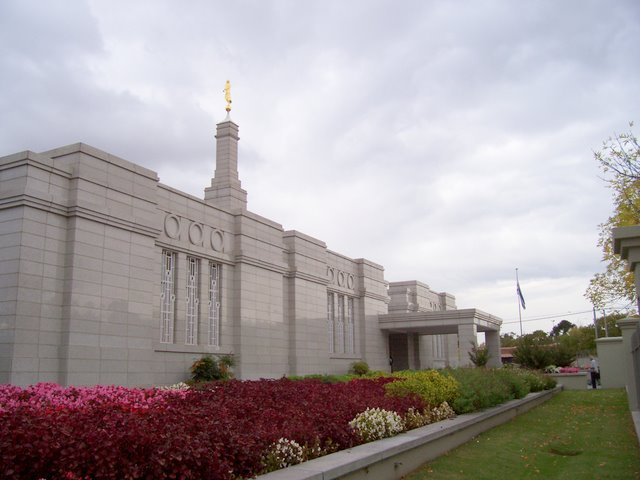
- Interactive map of Montevideo Uruguay Temple
- Number: 103
- Dedication: 18 March 2001, by Gordon B. Hinckley
- Site: 1.59 acres (0.64 ha)
- Floor area: 10,700 ft^{2} (990 m^{2})
- Height: 71 ft (22 m)
- Official website • News & images

Church chronology
| ← Porto Alegre Brazil Temple | Montevideo Uruguay Temple | → Winter Quarters Nebraska Temple |

Additional information
- Announced: 2 November 1998, by Gordon B. Hinckley
- Groundbreaking: 27 April 1999, by Richard G. Scott
- Open house: 28 February – 10 March 2001
- Current president: Juan Pera Maidana
- Designed by: Edvardo Signorelli
- Location: Montevideo, Uruguay
- Coordinates: 34°53′18.39839″S 56°4′26.71680″W
- Exterior finish: Asa branca granite
- Design: Classic modern, single-spire design
- Baptistries: 1
- Ordinance rooms: 2 (two-stage progressive)
- Sealing rooms: 2

Montevideo Uruguay Temple
Red = Operating
Blue = Under Construction
Yellow = announced
Black = Closed for Renovations

The Montevideo Uruguay Temple is a temple of the Church of Jesus Christ of Latter-day Saints in Montevideo, Uruguay. The intent to build the temple was announced in a letter to local church leaders by the First Presidency on November 2, 1998. A groundbreaking ceremony, to signify the beginning of construction, was held on April 27, 1999, conducted by Richard G. Scott of the Quorum of the Twelve Apostles. The temple has a single spire with a statue of the angel Moroni on the top. Designed by architect Edvardo Signorelli in a classic modern style, the temple's exterior has asa branca granite. After construction was completed, nearly 25,000 people toured the temple during a public open house prior to its dedication, including Uruguay's president, Jorge Batlle. The temple was dedicated on March 18, 2001, by church president Gordon B. Hinckley.

== History ==
The temple was announced by the First Presidency on November 2, 1998. The site had been acquired by the church in the 1960s and was known locally as "Mormon grounds."

A groundbreaking ceremony took place on April 27, 1999, marking the commencement of construction, with Richard G. Scott of the Quorum of the Twelve Apostles, presiding. Scott had served as a missionary in Uruguay approximately 48 years earlier. During the ceremony, attended by about 900 people, Scott recalled his missionary experiences, noting he had served as president of the Montevideo District and expressed gratitude for the church's growth in Uruguay. Carlos H. Amado, a general authority and president of the church's South America South Area, offered the site's dedicatory prayer at the groundbreaking.

Following construction, the church announced the public open house that was held from February 28 through March 10, 2001. During the open house, nearly 25,000 people visited the temple. Several dignitaries were among the visitors, including Jorge Batlle, the president of Uruguay; Luis Alberto Lacalle, a former president of Uruguay; and Antonio Mercader, the country's minister of education and culture. Following his tour, Batlle spoke of the temple as a place where moral values are evident, stating that such values should guide families. Visitors of other faiths commented that they felt they had left the world behind when they entered the temple.

The Montevideo Uruguay Temple was dedicated on March 18, 2001, by church president Gordon B. Hinckley. More than 7,655 members attended the four dedicatory sessions. Others church leaders attending with Hinckley included Dallin H. Oaks of the Quorum of the Twelve, along with members of the area presidency: Jay E. Jensen, Keith Crockett, and Claudio Zivic. The wives of each of these leaders also attended. Marne Tuttle, widow of A. Theodore Tuttle, the first general authority called to live in Montevideo and who directed missionary work in South America in the early 1960s, also attended. It became the church's 11th temple dedicated in South America.

The dedication was meaningful for many Uruguayan members, including those affected by a 1999 traffic accident involving church members traveling to the Buenos Aires Argentina Temple, in which several youth were killed. The new temple in Montevideo significantly reduced the distance members needed to travel for temple worship, as Buenos Aires was more than 72 hours away by automobile.

The temple site had been owned by the church since the 1960s and also has two mission homes, a distribution center, and a regional church service center. The site is located in the Carrasco neighborhood, considered one of Montevideo's most exclusive residential districts, east of the nation's capital.

=== Church growth in Uruguay ===
The church's first branch in Uruguay was organized in 1944. In 1948, Uruguay became the third South American nation to have a mission of the church, following Argentina and Brazil. The Uruguayan mission was organized in 1947, with Frederick S. Williams serving as president. By 2001, when the temple was dedicated, Uruguay had 73,000 members organized in 15 stakes, six districts, and two missions.

== Design and architecture ==
The temple was designed by architect Edvardo Signorelli with a classic modern design. The temple is on a 1.59-acre plot in the Carrasco neighborhood of Montevideo. The landscaping around the temple features palm trees, shrubs, and flowers native to the area. The temple grounds are located near the shoreline of the Río de la Plata river. Sharing the church-owned city block with the temple are a meetinghouse, a patron housing facility, two mission homes, a regional service center, and a distribution center.

The structure is 149 feet by 77 feet, with a total floor area of 10,700 square feet. The exterior is asa branca granite. The temple has a single spire that supports a gold-leafed statue of Moroni. The temple has two ordinance rooms, two sealing rooms, and a baptistry.

== Temple leadership and admittance ==
The church's temples are directed by a temple president and matron, each typically serving for a term of three years. The president and matron oversee the administration of temple operations and provide guidance and training for both temple patrons and staff. Serving from 2000 to 2003, Joseph K. Brooks was the first president, with Nelda J. Brooks serving as matron. As of 2024, Juan C. Pera is the president, with María L. Dominga Fiorina serving as matron.

=== Admittance ===
After construction was completed, a public open house was held from February 28 through March 10, 2001. Like all the church's temples, it is not used for Sunday worship services. To members of the church, temples are regarded as sacred houses of the Lord. Once dedicated, only church members with a current temple recommend can enter for worship.

== See also ==
- Comparison of temples of The Church of Jesus Christ of Latter-day Saints
- List of temples of The Church of Jesus Christ of Latter-day Saints
- List of temples of The Church of Jesus Christ of Latter-day Saints by geographic region
- Temple architecture (Latter-day Saints)
- The Church of Jesus Christ of Latter-day Saints in Uruguay

== Additional reading ==
- Curbelo, Nestor (15 May 1999), "Groundbreaking begins 'a new era for Uruguay'", Church News
- "Montevideo Uruguay Temple Dedicated", Ensign, May 2001, p. 109
- "Montevideo Uruguay: 'Here we will carry forward a great work'", Church News, 24 March 2001
