= Pocatello Idaho Temple =

Mormon temple in the United States

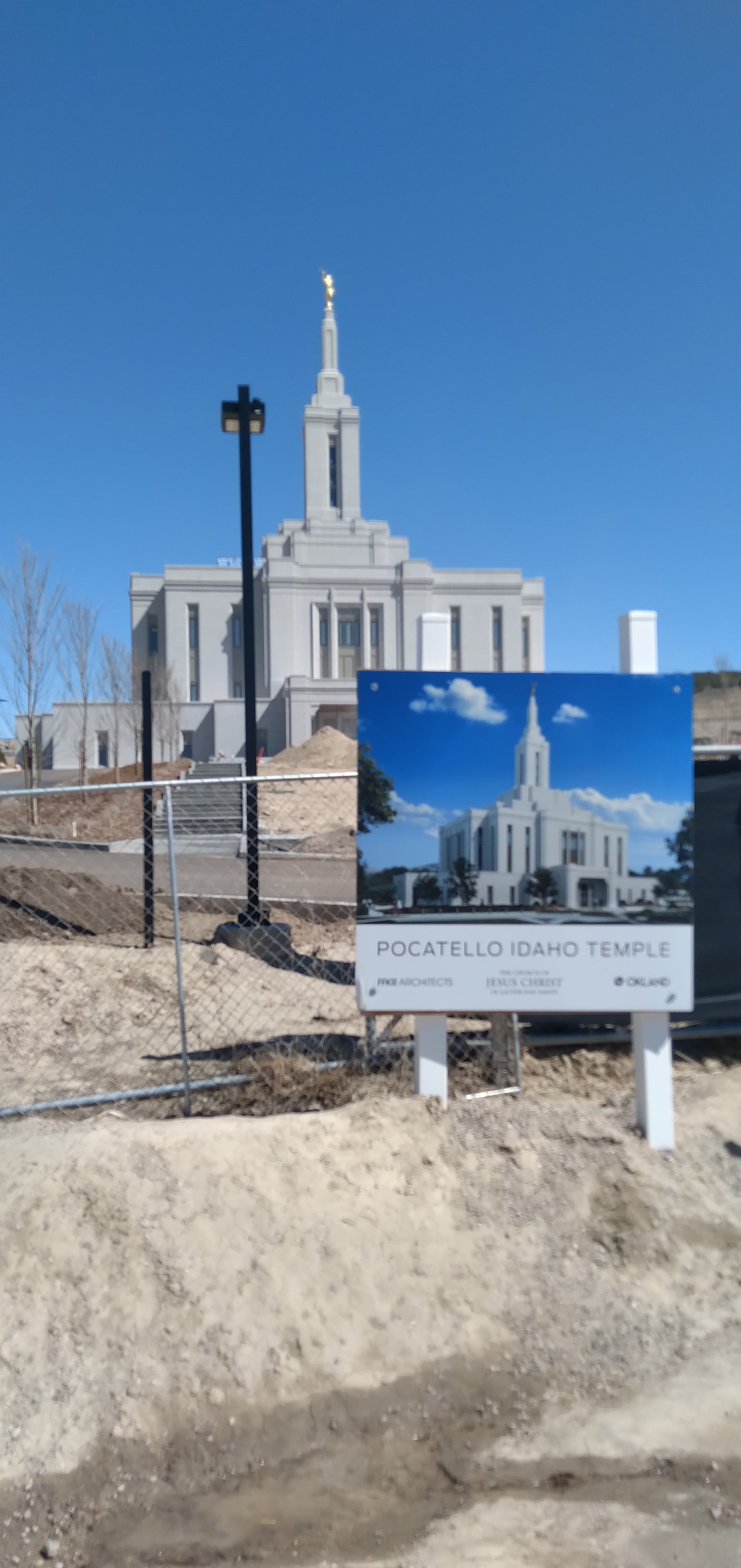
- Pocatello temple under construction
- Interactive map of Pocatello Idaho Temple
- Number: 170
- Dedication: 7 November 2021, by M. Russell Ballard
- Site: 10.94 acres (4.43 ha)
- Floor area: 71,125 ft^{2} (6,607.7 m^{2})
- Height: 196.5 ft (59.9 m)
- Official website • News & images

Church chronology
← Winnipeg Manitoba Temple	Pocatello Idaho Temple	→ Rio de Janeiro Brazil Temple

Additional information
- Announced: 2 April 2017, by Thomas S. Monson
- Groundbreaking: 16 March 2019, by Wilford W. Andersen
- Current president: M. Dirk Driscoll
- Location: Pocatello, Idaho, United States
- Coordinates: 42.9152°N 112.4064°W
- Exterior finish: white granite
- Baptistries: 1
- Ordinance rooms: 4 (Stationary)
- Sealing rooms: 4
- Clothing rental: Yes

The Pocatello Idaho Temple is a temple of the Church of Jesus Christ of Latter-day Saints in Pocatello, Idaho, the sixth in that state. It has a single attached central spire, topped with a statue of the angel Moroni. It was designed by FFKR Architects and church architects Scott Bleak and Joshua Stewart, using streamlined Classical architecture. Construction concluded in 2021, and the temple was dedicated the same year.

== History ==
The intent to construct the temple was announced by church president Thomas S. Monson on April 2, 2017, It was one of the last five temples announced by Monson before his death in 2018.

On March 16, 2019, a groundbreaking to signify beginning of construction was held, with Wilford W. Andersen of the Seventy presiding. The ceremony was attended by an interfaith group, and Taysom Hill of the New Orleans Saints spoke at the event. Construction was expected to last for several years, and, as of August 2019, the site was noted to attract "several visitors every day".

In March 2019, the church released drawings of the temple, which is three stories tall, over 67,000 square feet (6,200 m^{2}), and has a spire.

Following the temple's completion, a public open house was held from September 18 to October 23, 2021, with approximately 250,000 people visiting. The temple was dedicated on November 7, 2021, by M. Russell Ballard.

== Design and architecture ==
The temple is built according to a streamlined Classical architecture style, along with a traditional Latter-day Saint temple design. The architects used inspiration from other church temples, such as the one in Tucson, Arizona, and traditional buildings in Pocatello, including a local high school.

The temple sits on a 10.94-acre plot, and the surrounding landscaping features a series of formal planting areas, arranged in a linear pattern with a vertical hierarchy. It includes trees, most commonly Norwegian sunset maple, sawleaf zelkova, and Dolgo crabapple, as well as shrubs, such as English lavender, snowberry, and snow queen hydrangea. Prior to the temple’s public open house, young church members from the area planted 25,000 flowers to prepare the grounds.

The structure stands two stories tall and is constructed with light-gray granite. The exterior has a central spire and is topped with a statue of the angel Moroni. The exterior also has art glass windows that depict Idaho mountain wildflowers, such as the Idaho state flower, the Syringa, and bitterroot. The windows have a color palette of sage, gold, pink, and coral.

The interior features carpets, rugs, and decorative paintings with the same color palette and floral motifs of the exterior art glass. The temple's chapel holds an art glass tri-part depiction of Jesus Christ, which was salvaged and restored from a chapel in the eastern United States. The temple includes four instruction rooms, four sealing rooms, and a baptistry, each designed for ceremonial use.

== See also ==
- Comparison of temples of The Church of Jesus Christ of Latter-day Saints
- List of temples of The Church of Jesus Christ of Latter-day Saints
- List of temples of The Church of Jesus Christ of Latter-day Saints by geographic region
- Temple architecture (Latter-day Saints)
