= Vila Jardim =

Coordinates: 30°02′05″S 51°09′13″W

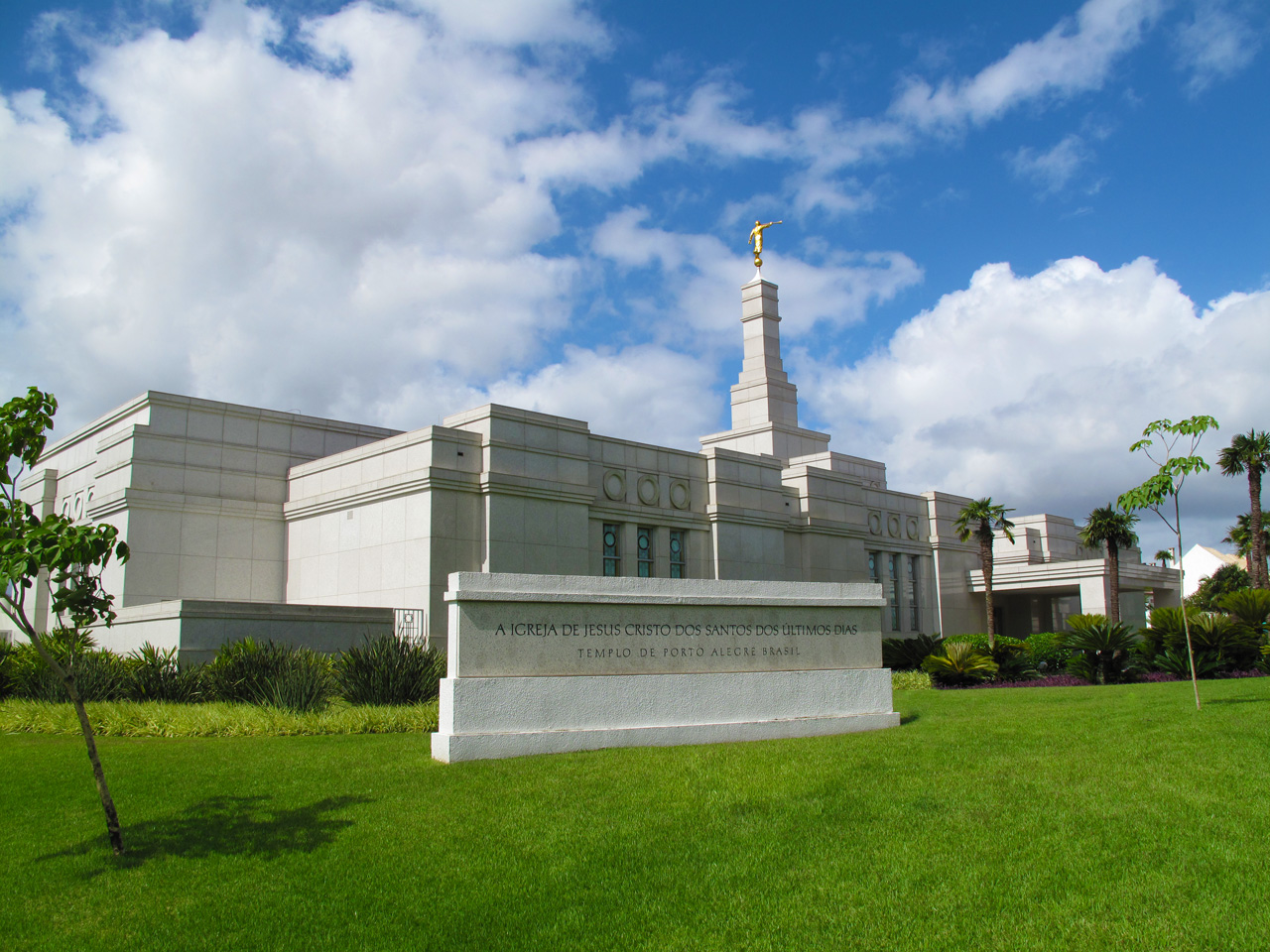
The Porto Alegre Temple in Vila Jardim.

Vila Jardim (meaning Garden Villa in English) is a neighbourhood (bairro) in the city of Porto Alegre, the state capital of Rio Grande do Sul, in Brazil. It was created by Law 2022 from December 7, 1959. Most of the residents migrated from the interior of Rio Grande do Sul in the 1970s and 1980s. By 2000, the neighbourhood was home to 14,251 residents.
