= São Paulo Brazil Temple =

LDS Temple in São Paulo, Brazil

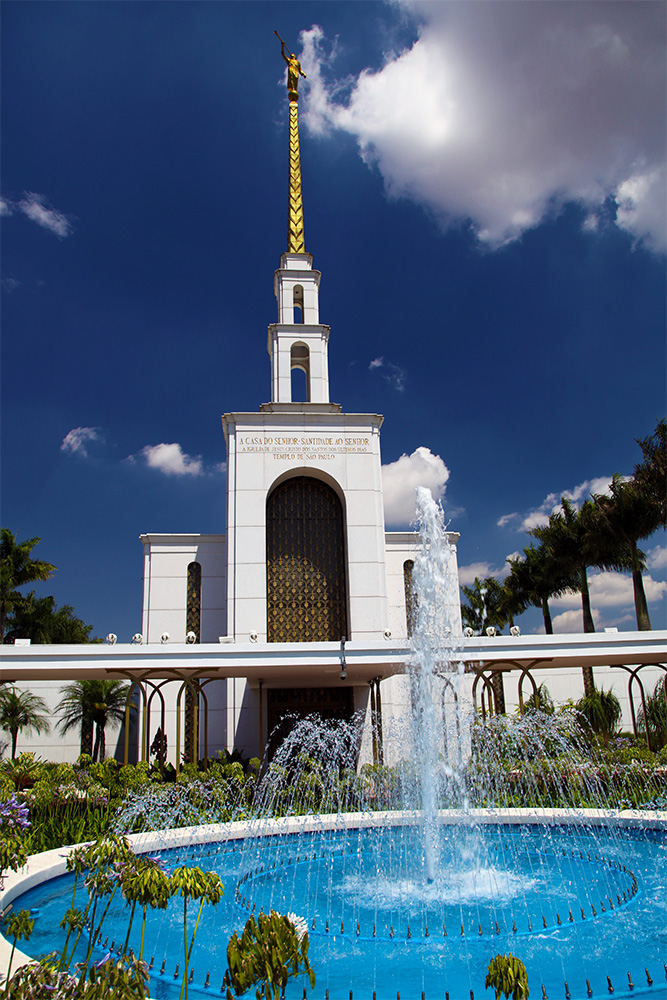
- Interactive map of São Paulo Brazil Temple
- Number: 17
- Dedication: 30 October 1978, by Spencer W. Kimball
- Site: 1.85 acres (0.75 ha)
- Floor area: 59,246 ft^{2} (5,504.1 m^{2})
- Official website • News & images

Church chronology
| ← Washington D.C. Temple | São Paulo Brazil Temple | → Tokyo Japan Temple |

Additional information
- Announced: 1 March 1975, by Spencer W. Kimball
- Groundbreaking: 20 March 1976, by James E. Faust
- Open house: 1-30 September 1978; 17 January–14 February 2004
- Rededicated: 22 February 2004, by Gordon B. Hinckley
- Current president: Reinaldo Barreto
- Designed by: Emil B. Fetzer
- Location: São Paulo, Brazil
- Coordinates: 23°35′06″S 46°43′22″W
- Exterior finish: Cast stone composed of quartz and marble aggregates set in white cement
- Design: Spanish influenced modern, single-spire design
- Baptistries: 1
- Ordinance rooms: 2 (stationary)
- Sealing rooms: 4
- Clothing rental: yes

The São Paulo Brazil Temple (formerly the São Paulo Temple) is the 19th constructed and 17th operating temple of the Church of Jesus Christ of Latter-day Saints (LDS Church). Located in the Brazilian city of São Paulo, it was the first Latter-day Saint temple built in South America, and the first to use a single story, single spire design. The spire is 101 feet (31 m) tall. The intent to build the temple was announced on March 1, 1975, by church president Spencer W. Kimball at an area conference. A groundbreaking ceremony, to signify the beginning of construction, was held on March 20, 1976, conducted by James E. Faust.

== History ==
=== The LDS Church in Brazil ===
There have been church members in Brazil since 1913, when German immigrants and church members, Max and Amalie Zapf, immigrated to the country. Several more church members immigrated to Brazil in the 1920s, but the church's first missionaries weren’t sent until 1928, with the first converts baptized in 1929. In 1930, the first branch was established. The church continued to grow in Brazil, reaching 3.700 members by the end of the 1950s. As of 2012, the church had over a million members in Brazil, and Brazil has the “third-largest Church population in the world, after the United States and Mexico.”

=== The São Paulo Temple ===
The intent to construct a temple in São Paulo was announced by the LDS Church on March 1, 1975, with construction beginning twelve months later. The groundbreaking ceremony took place on March 20, 1976, marking the commencement of construction. This ceremony was presided over by James E. Faust and attended by local church members and community leaders. Faust mentioned the sacrifice members made toward the temple, including donating gold fillings from dental work, and stated that he purchased some of that gold above market price to show to other congregations of the church, intending to honor their sacrifice. Hundreds of local church members gathered to clear the site, which included removing brush, weeds, and banana trees. Hundreds more members donated their time to produce fifty thousand blocks of cast stone composed of quartz, marble chips, and white concrete for the exterior of the temple. It was dedicated on October 30, 1978, by church president Spencer W. Kimball. The temple has two ordinance rooms and four sealing rooms, and a total floor area of 59,246 square feet (5,504 m^{2}).

On August 20, 2003, a gold-leafed statue of the angel Moroni was added to the temple during an extensive renovation and enlargement project 25 years after its dedication. Church president Gordon B. Hinckley rededicated the temple on February 22, 2004.

In 2020, like all the church's others, the São Paulo Brazil Temple was closed for a time in response to the COVID-19 pandemic.

== Design and architecture ==
The building has Spanish-influenced modern design, along with a traditional Latter-day Saint temple design. Designed by Emil B. Fetzer, its architecture reflects both the cultural heritage of the region and its spiritual significance to the church.

=== Site ===
The temple sits on a 1.85-acre plot, and the landscaping around the temple features flowerbeds and a water fountain. These elements provide a tranquil setting that enhances the sacred atmosphere of the site. There is also a visitors' center on the temple grounds.

The structure is 101 feet tall, constructed with reinforced concrete faced with quartz and marble aggregates. The exterior has a single attached end spire with an angel Moroni statue

The temple includes a baptistry, two ordinance rooms, and four sealing rooms, each arranged for ceremonial use.

The design has elements representing Latter-day Saint symbolism, to provide deeper spiritual meaning its appearance and function. Symbolism is important to church members. Church members believe temples function as literal houses of the Lord, and symbolize the relationship between him and his followers.

== Renovations ==
Over the years, the temple has undergone several renovations to preserve its structural integrity, update facilities, and enhance its spiritual and aesthetic appeal. The most significant renovation project commenced in 2002.

Those renovations included expanding the temple, updating the mechanical systems, and adding a statue of the angel Moroni to the spire. These changes were made to ensure its with contemporary building standards and to accommodate the evolving needs of the church and its members.

The renovation included refurbishment of the original furniture, which was made in the factory of Walter Spat, who was the first president of the first stake in Brazil. The furniture “remains in excellent condition because of the high quality of the original work.”

The renovated temple was rededicated on February 22, 2004, by Gordon B. Hinckley.

== Cultural and community impact ==
The temple's surrounding grounds were the site of a cultural celebration on February 21, 2004, to commemorate its rededication. Despite torrential rain, approximately 60,000 people gathered in Pacaembu Stadium for the event. The celebration featured dancers in traditional costumes, characters from Brazilian children’s literature, and a 1,200-person choir.

The visitors' center helps educate and spiritually uplift the community by providing insights into the history of the church in Brazil. The visitors' center was dedicated on January 21, 2019, and was the first in South America. It has a Christus statue and interactive exhibits, and provides members and non-members with understanding of “the love of the Brazilian people for one another and for the Savior” and the temple's place in church history.

== Temple presidents ==
The church's temples are directed by a temple president and matron, each typically serving for a term of three years. The president and matron oversee the administration of temple operations and provide guidance and training for both temple patrons and staff.

Serving from 1978 to 1979, Finn B. Paulsen was the first president, with Sara M. Paulsen serving as matron. As of 2024, Reinaldo de Souza Barreto is the president, with Glaucia R. Barreto serving as matron. Helio R. Camargo served as its president from 1990 to 1993).

== Admittance ==
When the temple was completed, an open house was held in September 1978. The temple was dedicated by Spencer W. Kimball in ten sessions from October 30-November 2, 1978. Following its renovation period from 2002-2004, another open house was held from January 17 to February 14, 2004, with around 99,000 people attending. The temple was then rededicated on February 22, 2004, by Gordon B. Hinckley. Like all the church's temples, it is not used for Sunday worship services. To members of the church, temples are regarded as sacred houses of the Lord. Once dedicated, only church members with a current temple recommend can enter for worship. The visitors’ center is available to the public.

== See also ==
- Comparison of temples of The Church of Jesus Christ of Latter-day Saints
- List of temples of The Church of Jesus Christ of Latter-day Saints
- List of temples of The Church of Jesus Christ of Latter-day Saints by geographic region
- Temple architecture (Latter-day Saints)
