= Brisbane Australia Temple =

Temple of the Church of Jesus Christ of Latter-day Saints

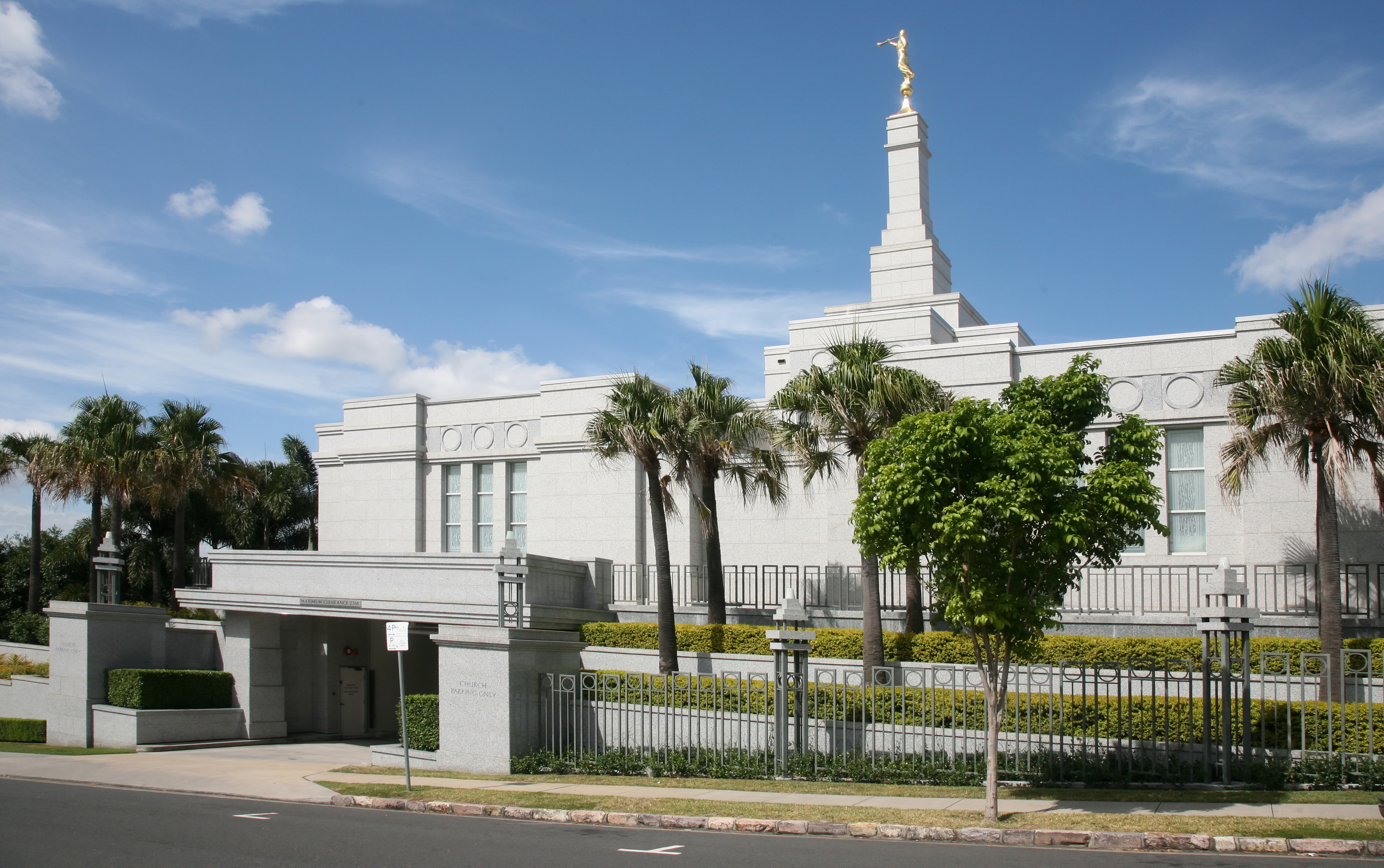
- Interactive map of Brisbane Australia Temple
- Number: 115
- Dedication: 15 June 2003, by Gordon B. Hinckley
- Site: 0.86 acres (0.35 ha)
- Floor area: 10,700 ft^{2} (990 m^{2})
- Height: 71 ft (22 m)
- Official website • News & images

Church chronology
← The Hague Netherlands Temple	Brisbane Australia Temple	→ Redlands California Temple

Additional information
- Announced: 20 July 1998, by Gordon B. Hinckley
- Groundbreaking: 26 May 2001, by Kenneth Johnson
- Open house: 10 May – 7 June 2003
- Current president: Garth Pitman
- Designed by: Phillips, Smith, Conwell
- Location: Kangaroo Point, Queensland, Australia
- Coordinates: 27°28′51.18960″S 153°2′1.827599″E
- Exterior finish: Gray granite
- Design: Classic modern, single-spire design
- Baptistries: 1
- Ordinance rooms: 2 (two-stage progressive)
- Sealing rooms: 2

The Brisbane Australia Temple is the 115th operating temple of the Church of Jesus Christ of Latter-day Saints (LDS Church). It is located at 200 River Terrace, Kangaroo Point in Brisbane, Queensland, Australia. The intent to build the temple was announced on 20 July 1998, by the church's First Presidency. The temple was the fifth in Australia, following the Adelaide, Melbourne, Perth, and Sydney temples.

The temple has a single attached spire with a statue of the angel Moroni. The temple was designed by Phillips, Smith, Conwell Architects, using a traditional architectural style. The groundbreaking ceremony, to signify the beginning of construction, was held on May 26, 2001, conducted by Kenneth Johnson, a general authority and president of the church’s Australia/New Zealand Area.

== History ==
The temple was announced on 20 July 1998, the first of several temples announced for Australia that month. The site chosen for the temple was the location of a stake center built in 1956, making it one of Australia’s oldest Latter-day Saint meetinghouses. Local opposition to the temple delayed construction, but the project was able to proceed following negotiations and minor changes to the design.

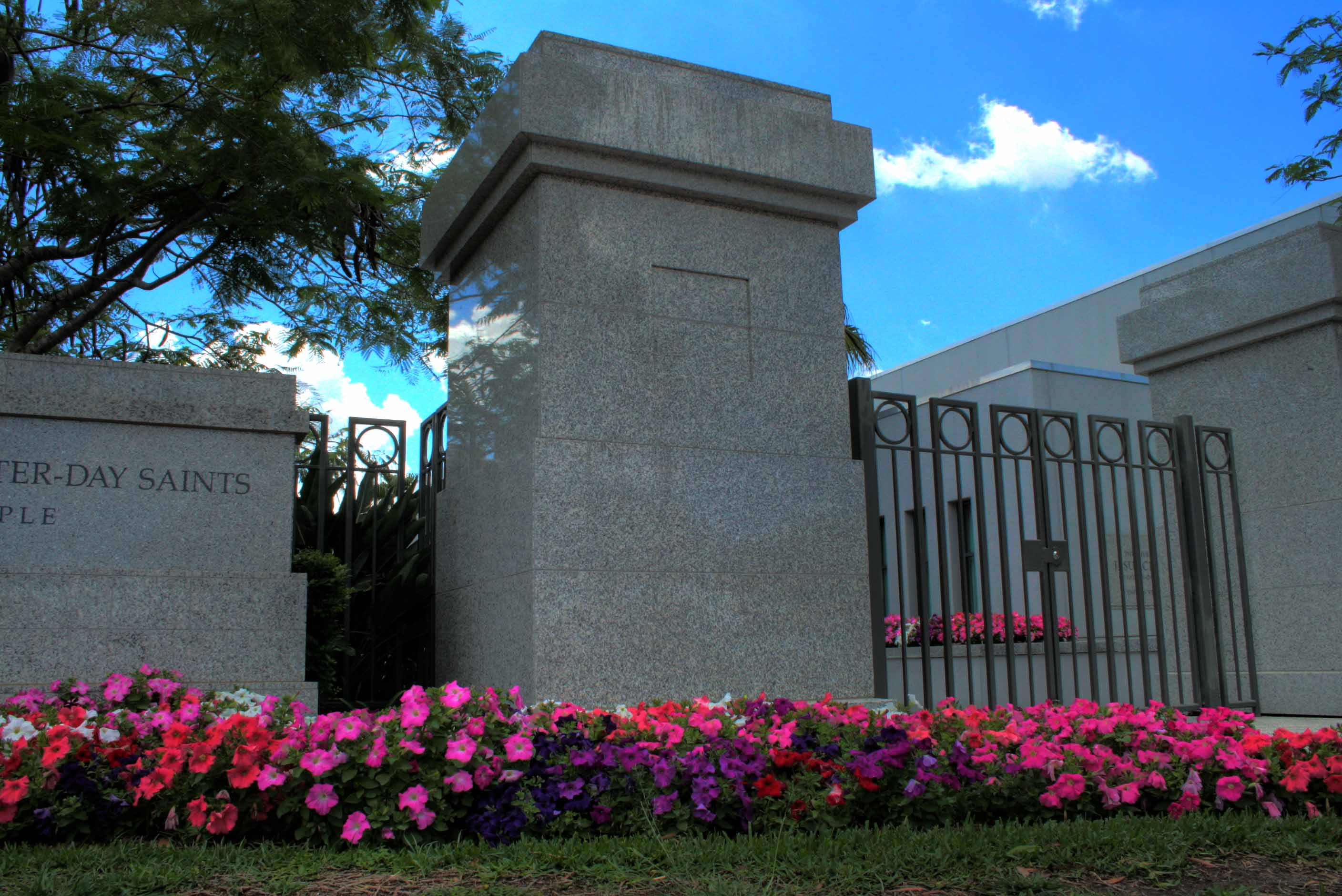
Entrance to Temple grounds

On 26 May 2001, Kenneth Johnson presided at the groundbreaking ceremony and site dedication. Construction of the temple began in November 2001 and took 18 months to complete.

A public open house was held from 10 May through 7 June 2003. The Brisbane Australia Temple was dedicated on 15 June 2003 by LDS Church president Gordon B. Hinckley. It was the 80th temple dedicated by Hinckley during his tenure as church president.

In 2020, like all the church's others, the Brisbane Australia Temple was closed for a time in response to the COVID-19 pandemic.

== Design and architecture ==
The building has a traditional Latter-day Saint temple design. Designed by Phillips, Smith, Conwell Architects, the temple's architecture reflects both the cultural heritage of the Brisbane area and its spiritual significance to the church.

The temple is on a 0.86-acre plot overlooking the Brisbane River, with surrounding landscaping of water fountains, palm trees, and stepped gardens.

The structure was constructed with light gray granite. The interior has several original artworks, including a painting in the foyer of Mt. Mitchell by Queensland artist Ken Wenzel. Mt. Mitchell is a landmark located near Queensland’s border with New South Wales. Additionally, the first ordinance room “features a mural on three walls painted by Utah artist, Linda Curly-Christensen. The scene shows the Glasshouse Mountains, a panoramic part of Queensland in the hinterland north of Brisbane.”

The temple includes two ordinance rooms, two sealing rooms, and a baptistry, each designed for ceremonial use.

The design has elements representing Latter-day Saint symbolism, to provide deeper spiritual meaning to the temple's appearance and function. Symbolism is important to church members and include the statue of the angel Moroni on top of the temple’s spire. The statue represents “the restoration of the gospel of Jesus Christ.” As with many Latter-day Saint temples, the statue on the Brisbane Australia Temple faces east, to symbolize the scriptural belief that Jesus Christ will arrive from the east during the Second Coming.

== Temple presidents ==
The church's temples are directed by a temple president and matron, each serving for a term of three years. The president and matron oversee the administration of temple operations and provide guidance and training for both temple patrons and staff.

Serving from 2003 to 2006, the first president of the Brisbane Australia Temple was John D. Jeffrey, with Lois G. Jeffrey as matron. As of 2025, Garth S. Pitman is the president, with Joanne D. Pitman serving as matron.

== Admittance ==
After construction was completed, a public open house was held from 10 May to 7 June 2003 (excluding Sundays). During the open house, over 50,000 people toured the temple. The temple was dedicated by Gordon B. Hinckley on 15 June 2003, in four sessions.

Like all the church's temples, it is not used for Sunday worship services. To members of the church, temples are regarded as sacred houses of the Lord. Once dedicated, only church members with a current temple recommend can enter for worship.

== See also ==
- Comparison of temples of The Church of Jesus Christ of Latter-day Saints
- List of temples of The Church of Jesus Christ of Latter-day Saints
- List of temples of The Church of Jesus Christ of Latter-day Saints by geographic region
- Temple architecture (Latter-day Saints)
- The Church of Jesus Christ of Latter-day Saints in Australia
