= The Church of Jesus Christ of Latter-day Saints in Australia =

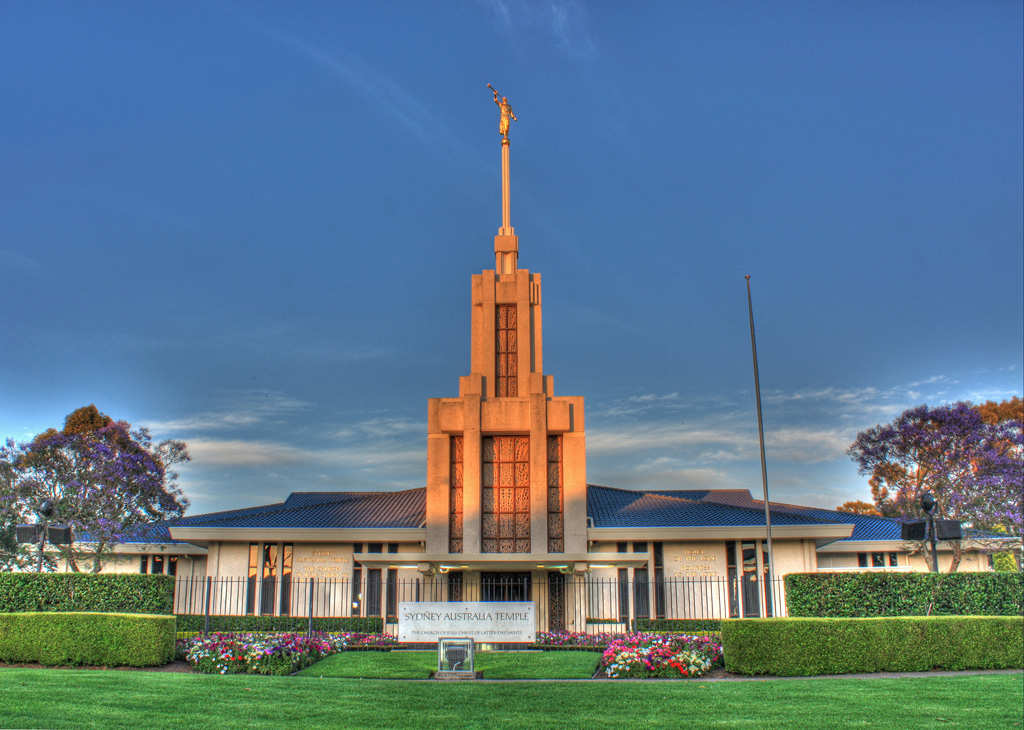
- The Sydney Australia Temple
- Area: Pacific
- Census: 61,600 (2016)
- Members: 165,272 (2025)
- Stakes: 40
- Districts: 4
- Wards: 232
- Branches: 68
- Total congregations: 300
- Missions: 5
- Temples: 5 operating; 2 announced; 7 total
- FamilySearch Centers: 137

The Church of Jesus Christ of Latter-day Saints (LDS Church) in Australia began with the arrival of William James Barratt in 1840. The LDS Church's first baptism in Australia was in 1842 when Barratt baptised Robert Beauchamp, who would later become an Australian mission president. However, official missionary work did not begin until John Murdock, who became the first official mission president in Australia, and Charles Wandell established a mission in Sydney, Australia, on 31 October 1851. The colonies of New Zealand and Tasmania were added to the Australian Mission in 1854, creating the Australasian Mission. In 1898, however, the Australasian Mission was divided into the New Zealand Mission and the Australian Mission.

Due to many factors including the lack of missionary force, the vastness of the country, and the large scale emigration of church members in Australia throughout the nineteenth-century, the church grew slowly until the 1950s. Considered to be the turning point in the history of the LDS Church in Australia, church president David O. McKay visited Australia in 1955 and determined a need for more permanent buildings for congregations throughout Australia. In 1956, the chapel building program established 19 chapels within two years. The LDS Church in Australia began to grow at a more rapid rate after the 1950s. By 1960, there were over 7,000 LDS Church members in the country and the first Australian stake was organised in Sydney on 27 March 1960. The Sydney Australia Temple, the first temple in Australia, was dedicated and began operations in September 1984.

Membership count include everyone that have joined the church that are still living as well as unbaptised children, regardless of current affiliation (see Membership defined). As of 31 December 2025, the LDS Church reported 165,272 members in 300 congregations in Australia which is the largest body of members and congregations in Oceania.

In the 2016 Australian census, 61,600 people self-identified as members of the LDS Church on an optional question. In the 2021 census, 57,868 people identified themselves as members of the church.

== History ==
Membership in Australia
| Year | Membership |
|---|---|
| 1900* | 300 |
| 1930 | 1,242 |
| 1940 | 1,894 |
| 1950 | 2,089 |
| 1960 | 7,071 |
| 1970 | 25,063 |
| 1979 | 37,537 |
| 1989* | 73,000 |
| 1999 | 99,121 |
| 2009 | 126,767 |
| 2019 | 154,595 |
| 2025 | 165,272 |
*Membership was published as a rounded number. Source: Wendall J. Ashton; Jim M. Wall, Deseret News, various years, Church Almanac Country Information: Australia

=== 1840–1879: Beginnings ===
The LDS Church was introduced into Australia when William Barratt emigrated from England to Adelaide in November 1840. At the age of seventeen, Barratt had been ordained an elder by George A. Smith, a member of the Quorum of the Twelve Apostles, who instructed him to proselyte whenever he could. Although the success of Barratt's proselyting efforts remains largely unknown, he did baptise Robert Beauchamp in 1842, who became the first Australian convert. Beauchamp would later become an Australian mission president. The next missionary in Australia was Andrew Anderson, who arrived with his family in 1842. By the end of 1844, Anderson had organised a small branch of the LDS Church with 11 members near Wellington, New South Wales. Official LDS missionary work did not begin until Americans John Murdock, who served as mission president, and Charles W. Wandell established a mission in Sydney on 31 October 1851. They printed 2,000 copies of Proclamation to the People of the Coasts and Islands of the Pacific, which they successfully sold. They exerted their time and resources to proselyte using pamphlets and printed many others. It was calculated that Wandell and Murdock had distributed 24,000 tracts. Their initial proselyting strategy was preaching in public meetings, but they soon acquired a meeting hall. The earliest converts at the official opening of the mission were in December 1851. They included Emily and Joseph Popplewells, Bridget Gallimore, and nine others. The Sydney Branch, a small organised congregation of Latter-day Saints, was organised on 4 January 1852 with twelve members. By March, there were 36 members. Murdock and Wandell directed three church meetings each Sunday as well as five public proselyting meetings per week. After Murdock returned to the United States in June 1852, Wandell replaced him as mission president.

By the end of 1852, there were 47 members of the LDS Church. Wandell reported that missionary work was difficult because the recent gold rush had caused people to be suspicious about strangers. Additionally, Wandell reported that the locals disliked Americans, and the missionaries could not locate free food and lodging. However, the missionaries hosted well-attended church meetings every Sunday and proselyted five days a week. In 1852, there were five missionaries and two local members performing full-time missionary service and Maitland and Melbourne areas were opened for proselyting. By March 1853, church membership had reached 100. After the departure of Wandell, John Jones became mission president. Upon Wandell's departure, a Latter-day Saint periodical called Zion's Watchman was in publication from 13 August 1853 until April 1856. Despite the growth of the church in Australia, numbers of its members in the country dwindled. This was because the early LDS Church encouraged emigration to the United States to gather members together into a physical "Zion". Consequently, groups of LDS Church members began to leave Australia. From 1853 to 1859, more than 500 LDS Church members emigrated to Utah and around 200 to 300 members emigrated from 1859 to 1900. It was expensive and dangerous to travel to the United States from Australia by boat. When the boat Julia Ann hit a coral reef in the Society Islands in 1855, two women and three children drowned.

More missionaries arrived in 1853, with Augustus Farnham replacing Jones as mission president. In 1854, missionary work was organised in New Zealand and Tasmania, leading to the creation of the Australasian Mission which included all of the territories in Australia and New Zealand. Missionary work was opened in Hunter River, Moreton Bay in Queensland, and Adelaide. At this time, missionaries experienced the greatest amount of success in southeastern Australia. Robert Owen initiated missionary work in Tasmania, but it was unsuccessful. By 1856, all missionaries had left Australia with church members emigrating to the United States. Absolom Dowdle became the new mission president. By the end of 1856, 16 missionaries had replaced the missionaries that left Australia. In 1858, due to the Utah War, missionaries left Australia to return home and fight in the war, leaving the local members in charge of ecclesiastical leadership of the small, church congregations. However, it did not last, and by 1863, leadership had been largely disbanded with the only 200 church members remaining in Australia, scattered across the country. Robert Beauchamp assumed the position of mission president in 1867, but the church was left in disarray when he resigned in 1874. During the first 18 months of Beauchamp's presidency, there had been over 150 baptisms. After Beauchamp resigned, William Geddes became mission president for a year. Elijah F. Peace became president of the Australasian Mission in 1879, moving headquarters to New Zealand.

=== 1880–1954: Mission division and slow growth ===
Beginning in 1857, missionary work in Australia was determined unsuccessful and the focus was turned to New Zealand. However, on 1 January 1898, the Australasian Mission was divided into the Australian Mission and the New Zealand Mission, allowing for more effort to be put into missionary work in Australia. Previously, from the 1860s until 1898, church leaders in Utah gave Australia little attention, and missionary work was not contiguous. There were three or four operating branches in Australia between 1879 and 1898. Andrew Smith was appointed the president of the new Australian mission. In 1890, the first converts were baptised in Brisbane and the East Brisbane Branch, the first branch in Brisbane, was organised on 1 September 1896. By 1898, it was not only the branch with the most complete leadership and organisation but also the largest in the country, with 79 members. By 1898, there were around 200 members in Australia and 21 missionaries in 1900. Because the LDS Church began encouraging church members to stay in their homelands rather than emigrate, church membership from 1910 to 1925 doubled from 600 to 1,169.

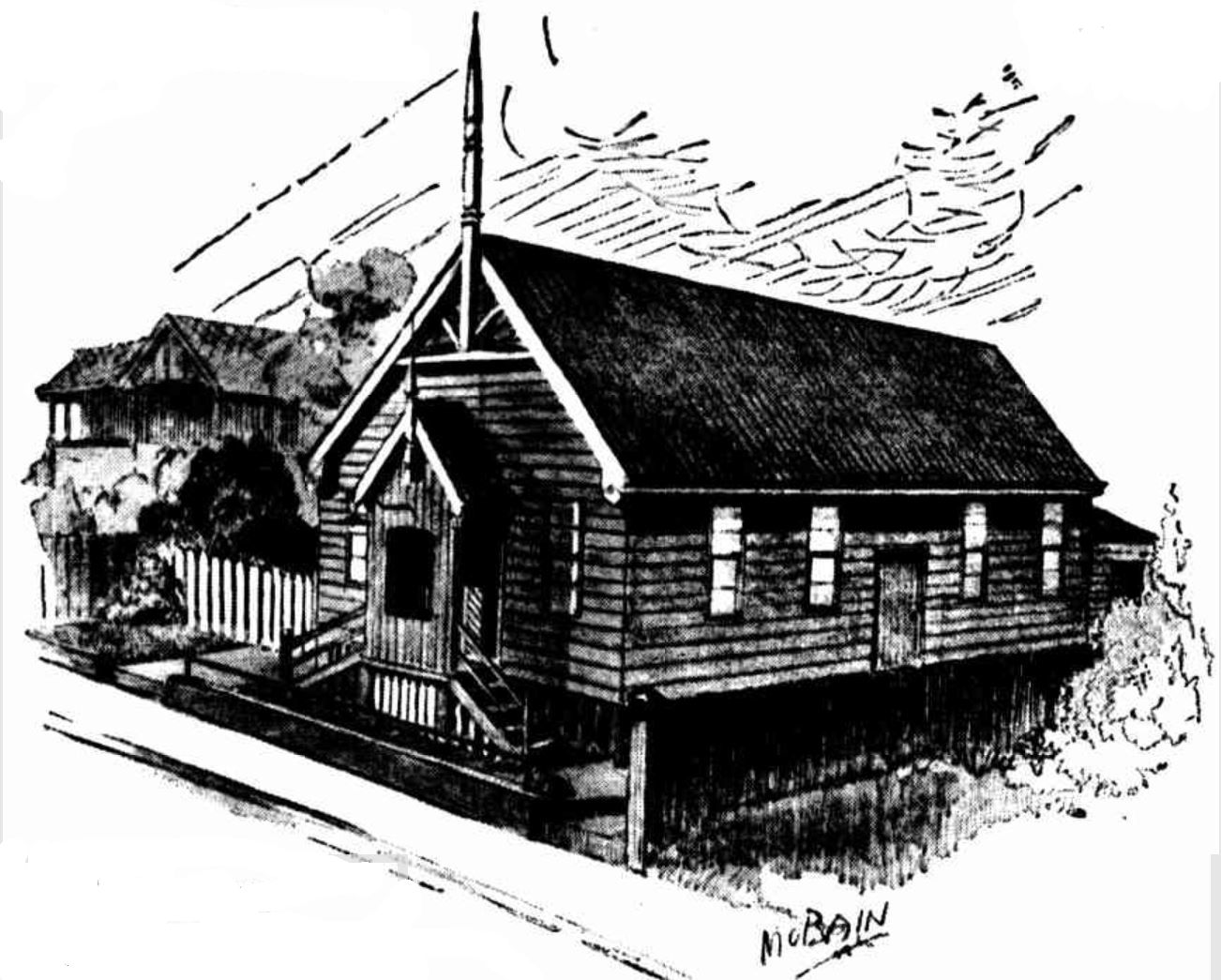
Sketch of the first meeting house in Woolloongabba, 1936

The first LDS chapel building in Australia opened on 4 December 1904 at 17 Gibbon Street, Woolloongabba in Brisbane; it remained in use until 3 August 1958, following the opening of a new meeting house at Kangaroo Point (since 2003, the site of the Brisbane Temple). During the first quarter of the century, growth in the LDS Church in Australia was slow. Despite the fact that the LDS Church reversed its emigration policy at the turn of the century, the policy remained culturally ingrained in the LDS Church for some time. Consequently, from 1900 to about 1925, around 15 church members emigrated from Australia each year. While missionary work in Australia was successful, there were too few missionaries in the country. Between 1910 and 1925, there was an average of 31 missionaries in the country. Generally, there were only four missionaries per district in Australia, and the vastness of the country made it difficult to travel from one side to another for conferences and visits with the mission president. Additionally, proselyting methods were underdeveloped with outdated teaching plans and the lack of challenges for interested individuals. Some missionaries believed that their most effective proselyting tool at the time was street meetings. Tracting was ineffective, and the Book of Mormon was rarely used as a proselyting tool. Moreover, due to World War I pulling men away from home to serve in the war, local congregations were left without sufficient leadership. Furthermore, the war caused the number of missionaries in Australia to be divided nearly in half.

Despite issues with circulating anti-Mormon literature, by 1923 the LDS Church was officially declared a "religious denomination" in Australia. In 1924, the Australian government allowed the LDS Church to raise the number of missionaries to 40. By 1925, church membership in Australia was around 1,200, with the largest congregation being in Sydney, consisting of about 300 members. Charles H. Hyde served as mission president from 1911 to 1913 and 1924 to 1928. During his second term, he sought to open new mission areas but found himself limited by the number of missionaries in the country.

Clarence H. Tingey succeeded Hyde as mission president, but during his presidency the number of missionaries in Australia declined due to the Great Depression in the United States. Sons and fathers were unable to leave their families during the difficult financial times. Despite these challenges, Tingey achieved great success by turning over leadership in individual congregations from missionaries to local members, which allowed missionaries to focus on proselyting rather than the administrative duties of local congregations. Moreover, Tingey developed a personal relationship with each missionary by exchanging letters and instituted fast days in order to distribute more copies of the Book of Mormon. He also established a missionary publication in 1930 called Austral Star, which was published until 1955. In 1930, Horace H. Woodford and J. Kenneth Rule were the first Australians to serve as missionaries in their country. Additionally, Tingey created genealogical organisations in 1931 to teach members about temple work and genealogical research. During this time, the average number of converts increased to 3.1 in 1931 with an average rate of 2.6 between 1933 and 1934. He also assigned 11 local members to serve two-year part-time missions to aid the full-time missionaries. From 1926 to 1951, church membership increased from 1,169 to 2,187 with an average of 58 baptisms per year.

Following World War I and the Great Depression, church membership in Australia increased. Missionary presence in Australia from 1935 to 1940 was the highest in the history of the LDS church in Australia. However, with the beginning of World War II, president of the LDS Church Heber J. Grant instructed all missionaries to return home, requiring church leadership positions that were previously held by missionaries to be held by local church members. However, this was difficult because many of the Australian church members were joining the Australian Army. The church in Australia did not recover in time for the Korean War. Historian Geoffrey Blainey argued that the factors that contributed to the slow growth of the LDS Church in Australia during the twentieth century were due to war, small missionary forces, and the vastness of the country. During World War II, the women in the Relief Societies in Australia volunteered for the Australian Red Cross to provide aid during the war.

=== 1955–1987: Church expansion ===
Church growth increased when David O. McKay authorised the building of chapels for congregations in 1955. This has been referred to as "the turning point for the Church in Australia". The South Australian Mission was established in 1955, headquartered in Melbourne. In 1956, the chapel building program was initiated in Australia. The program lasted for two years and resulted in 19 new chapels and plans for 15 more. By 1960, there were over 7,000 LDS Church members in Australia. In order to better organise the members, the first Australian stake was created in Sydney on 27 March 1960. This was the third stake organised outside North America, behind Oahu, Hawaii, and Auckland, New Zealand. Originally called the Sydney Stake, it was later named the Sydney Australia Greenwich Stake.

In October 1960, stakes were organised in Brisbane and Melbourne. The organisation of stakes contributed to the growth of the church in Australia because it relieved the workloads of mission presidents and transferred some of the responsibility to local leadership. The Sydney Distribution Centre was created in late 1960, which allowed for the distribution of teaching materials, equipment, and various other materials necessary for maintaining wards and branches. By 1962, the missionary force was 700 missionaries; the number of missionaries had expanded sevenfold in seven years. In 1968, the Australian West Mission (now the Australia Adelaide Mission) was established with Milton J. Hess as president. Before the end of 1969, there were seven stakes in Australia. In 1969, the first international seminary and institute program, religious learning groups for high school and college-aged students respectively, were established in Brisbane. In 1973, the Australia Northwest Mission (now the Australia Brisbane Mission) was created with J. Martell Bird as president.

In 1972, Australia was chosen to pilot a new missionary program called Uniform System for Teaching Families. In 1974, to accommodate Latin-American immigrants to Australia, a Spanish-speaking branch was opened Sydney, with two more Spanish-speaking branches established ten years later. The first area conference in Australia was held in February 1976 in the Sydney Opera House. (Note: In addition to Spanish-speaking missionaries, there are also Italian and Greek-speaking missionaries in Australia.) The conference ignited growth in convert baptisms and the number of stakes doubled from eight to sixteen within four years. Bruce J. Opie was the first Australian to serve as an Australian mission president. He served as president of the newly created Australian Perth Mission from 1975 to 1978. The first congregation for Aboriginal Australians was organised in 1896 in Elliott in the Northern Territory. In April 1980, the church's First Presidency announced that a temple would be built in Sydney. Prior to the dedication of the temple in Sydney, church members in Australia travelled to the New Zealand Temple, often at great financial cost. The church's first temple in Australia was the Sydney Australia Temple in the suburb of Carlingford, which was dedicated in September 1984. The temple was initially constructed and dedicated without an Angel Moroni statue, common for the majority of the church's temples, due to local building restrictions. However, the church was granted permission to add the statue one year later.

=== 1988–Present: Recent developments ===
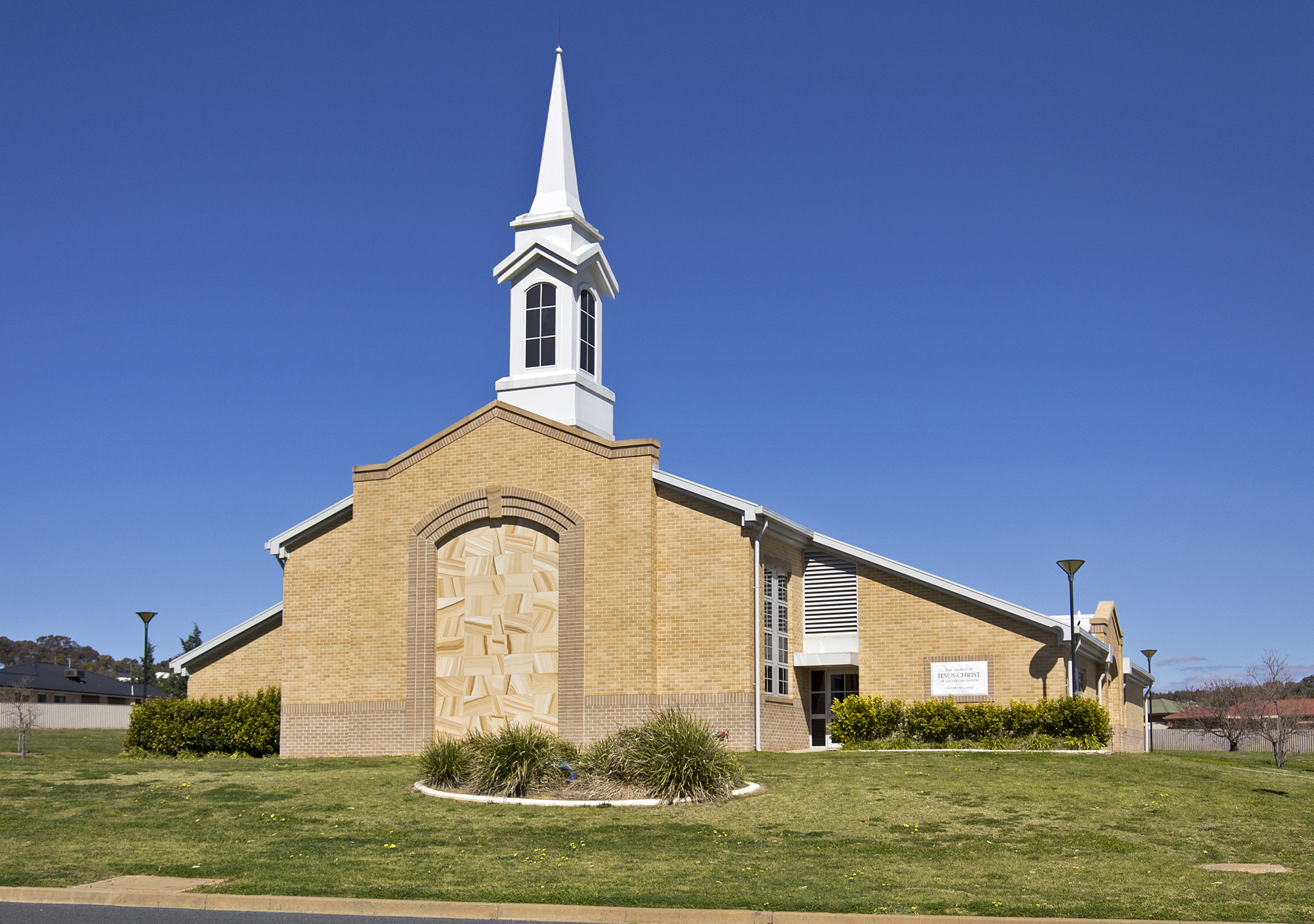
The Church of Jesus Christ of Latter-day Saints in Bourkelands, New South Wales.

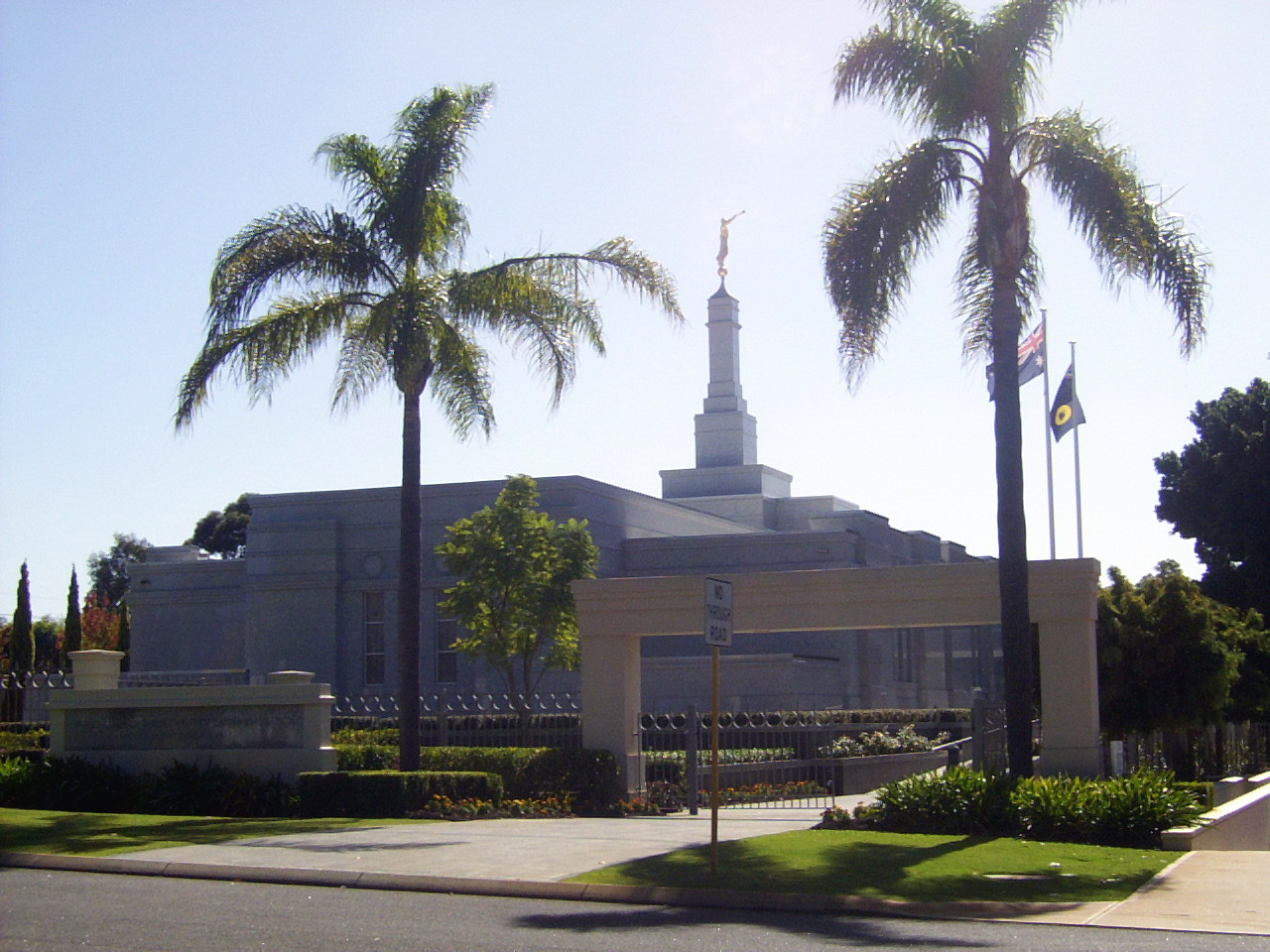
The Perth Australia Temple, completed in 2001

Robert E. Sackley became the first Australian general authority on 2 April 1988. Additionally, in summer 1988, the Tabernacle Choir performed for the first time in Australia for the celebration of Australia's bicentennial; the choir was named an official cultural representative of the United States for the celebration. By 1990, Sydney became the headquarters of the Pacific Area and church membership was 73,200. The Melbourne Australia Temple was dedicated on 12 June 2000, with the temple in Adelaide, the third in Australia, dedicated three days later. The fourth and fifth temples in Australia, in Brisbane and Perth, were dedicated on 1 October 2000 and 20 May 2001, respectively. The LDS Church provided extensive humanitarian services and resources to Australian after Cyclone Larry in 2006.

In 2022, the LDS Church's charitable practices attracted media coverage from The Age, Sydney Morning Herald, Canadian Broadcasting Corporation, 60 Minutes, and Crikey. Since religious donations and tithes are not tax deductible under Australian taxation law, the LDS Church had created a shell corporation called LDS Charities Australia for the purpose of ensuring tax deductible status for church donations and tithes. LDS Charities Australia had no paid employees, Australian website, and infrastructure, and appeared to be run by the Utah-based Latter-day Saint Charities. As of 2021, the charity had incurred just A$6070 in administrative expenses while donating A$93 million that year. By 2022, the church had generated A$400 million in tax deductions. Under Australian law, charities have to be based in Australia to qualify for tax deductibility status. Barrister and former LDS leader Neville Rochow accused the LDS Church in Australia of pressuring members to pay tithe, circumventing Australian tax law and called for the Australian Government to investigate the church's financial practices. In response to media coverage, an LDS Church spokesperson denied that the church was a financial or profit-making institution but was using its resources for "its divinely appointed mission".

== Challenges to missionary work ==
The LDS Church and its missionaries in Australia experienced setbacks in the early 1900s due to opposition from missionaries of the Reorganized Church of Jesus Christ of Latter Day Saints (RLDS). Many LDS Church members converted to the RLDS church. In early 1900, some members of the LDS Church received RLDS literature and began circulating it in the large Brisbane branch. 15 LDS Church members were baptised into the RLDS church and were thusly excommunicated for apostasy. Despite the loss of members, new members were baptised and one missionary viewed the apostasy as "cleaning out the tares".

Additionally, after an LDS missionary street meeting in Adelaide in 1913, RLDS missionaries began speaking ill of the LDS Church to the public, causing mobs and breakups of street meetings. Adelaide police forbid LDS missionaries from holding street meetings after these disturbances. There were a series of public debates in Brisbane between LDS and RLDS missionaries, the most prominent of which included the 1906 debate and the 1918 debate. The LDS missionary was considered the winner of the 1906 debate with inquiries of baptism to follow. The RLDS side won the 1918 debate, causing 12 LDS Church members to leave and join the RLDS church. The 12 members were excommunicated. No further debates were reported. After these incidents, LDS missionaries avoided contact with RLDS missionaries and church members.

After World War I, the number of missionaries in Australia dropped from 30 to 18. Consequently, in 1919, the LDS Church prepared to send more missionaries to Australia; however, a policy from the British Commonwealth prevented them from entering Australia. This also contributed to the slow growth of the LDS Church in Australia from 1900 to 1925; however, the ban was lifted in 1920. Additionally, the film A Mormon Maid, largely considered to be an anti-Mormon propaganda film, was shown in theatres throughout Australia. Anti-Mormon materials popularly distributed in England by Winifred Graham began circulating in Australia. Other Christian denominations attempted to prevent the LDS Church from building more chapels and attempted to force the church out of Australia. Negative feelings about the practice of polygamy represented another manner in which anti-Mormon attitudes prevented the growth of the LDS Church in Australia.

=== Cultural obstacles ===
According to author Marjorie Newton, there are several cultural factors that have prevented the growth of the LDS Church in Australia. The first cultural obstacle between Australia and the LDS Church is Australia–U.S. tensions. Since World War II, tensions between the United States and Australia have run higher due to United States involvement in various wars such as the Vietnam War and the Gulf War. Additionally, Australia has criticised the United States for not becoming involved in the Indonesian invasion of East Timor in the late 20th century. Finally, the United States is Australia's greatest trade competitor. Since the LDS Church was established in the United States and a great number of missionaries in Australia were from the United States, Australians did not always favourably view American missionaries. In addition, Australian society is largely secular, not religious. The Australian ideal is anti-authoritarian and anti-institutional, thus there is an underlying apprehension to the growth of any type of major institution, particularly a religious institution. Furthermore, church attendance and Sabbath-day observance in Australia is low. A 1991 survey found that 17% of Australians reported attending church monthly, compared to 34% in the United States. Moreover, discussing religion in Australia is often considered taboo, even for those who consider themselves religious.

Another obstacle to missionary work in Australia is the long-standing distaste for the LDS Church due to extremely aggressive proselyting tactics in the late 1970s due to a pilot program Australia participated in. The missionary lessons were condensed into one presentation and the baptismal font was filled before the investigators arrived. According to Newton, there were reports that apprehensive Australians were pressured into classrooms and told to pray for testimony with rumours that classroom doors were locked and "prayer sessions" were excessively long. Missionaries tracted for 90 hours per week, approaching front doors at extremely early or late hours. In order to maintain "stats", missionaries were required to tract in the same neighbourhoods multiple times per week, which bothered residents. Despite the fact that church membership was growing quickly, retention rates were low.

== Statistics and other information ==
People who identify as Latter-day Saints as a fraction of total persons, in Australia, Australia, according to the 2011 census results. The map is divided into geographical subdivisions by Statistical Local Area. Note the split scale above and below the median value.

As of 31 December 2022, the LDS Church reported 158,969 members, 40 stakes, four districts, 229 wards, 67 branches, 143 family history centres, and five missions. There are five temples in Australia, located in the cities of Adelaide, Brisbane, Melbourne, Perth, and Sydney. The membership reported by the church in Australia is approximately 0.57% of the country's population. However, the Australian Bureau of Statistics census in 2011 had only 59,770 who described themselves as Latter-day Saints or 0.28% of the population. LDS Church membership statistics are different from self-reported statistics mainly because the LDS Church does not remove an individual’s name from its membership rolls based on inactivity in the church. In 2016 census 60,867 self identified as being members of the church religion.

=== Stakes and districts ===
| Stake/District | Organized | Mission | Temple District |
|---|---|---|---|
| Adelaide Australia Marion Stake | 23 Feb 1966 | Australia Adelaide | Adelaide Australia |
| Adelaide Australia North Stake | 26 Nov 1995 | Australia Adelaide | Adelaide Australia |
| Brisbane Australia Beenleigh Stake | 4 Mar 2018 | Australia Brisbane South | Brisbane Australia |
| Brisbane Australia Centenary Stake | 9 Sep 2007 | Australia Brisbane South | Brisbane Australia |
| Brisbane Australia Cleveland Stake | 18 Nov 2012 | Australia Brisbane North | Brisbane Australia |
| Brisbane Australia Logan Stake | 22 Sep 2002 | Australia Brisbane North | Brisbane Australia |
| Brisbane Australia North Stake | 7 Feb 1988 | Australia Brisbane North | Brisbane Australia |
| Brisbane Australia Stake | 23 Oct 1960 | Australia Brisbane North | Brisbane Australia |
| Canberra Australia Stake | 19 Feb 1995 | Australia Sydney | Sydney Australia |
| Coffs Harbour Australia District | 1992 | Australia Brisbane South | Brisbane Australia |
| Coomera Australia Stake | 18 Nov 2012 | Australia Brisbane South | Brisbane Australia |
| Devonport Australia Stake | 10 Dec 1995 | Australia Melbourne | Melbourne Australia |
| Eight Mile Plains Australia Stake | 19 Feb 1978 | Australia Brisbane North | Brisbane Australia |
| Gold Coast Australia Stake | 10 Dec 1995 | Australia Brisbane South | Brisbane Australia |
| Hobart Australia Stake | 14 Sep 1977 | Australia Melbourne | Melbourne Australia |
| Ipswich Australia Stake | 21 Jun 1981 | Australia Brisbane South | Brisbane Australia |
| Ipswich Australia West Stake | 20 Mar 2016 | Australia Brisbane South | Brisbane Australia |
| Liverpool Australia Stake | 25 Oct 1998 | Australia Sydney | Sydney Australia |
| Macarthur Australia Stake | 28 Aug 1994 | Australia Sydney | Sydney Australia |
| Melbourne Australia Bayside Stake | 22 Aug 1971 | Australia Melbourne | Melbourne Australia |
| Melbourne Australia Craigieburn Stake | 20 Jan 2013 | Australia Melbourne | Melbourne Australia |
| Melbourne Australia Deer Park Stake | 7 Sep 1980 | Australia Melbourne | Melbourne Australia |
| Melbourne Australia Gippsland Stake | 13 Jan 2013 | Australia Melbourne | Melbourne Australia |
| Melbourne Australia Heidelberg Stake | 30 Oct 1960 | Australia Melbourne | Melbourne Australia |
| Melbourne Australia Maroondah Stake | 7 Dec 1986 | Australia Melbourne | Melbourne Australia |
| Melbourne Australia Narre Warren Stake | 2 Jul 1995 | Australia Melbourne | Melbourne Australia |
| Melbourne Australia Wyndham Stake | 21 Jun 1998 | Australia Melbourne | Melbourne Australia |
| Newcastle Australia Stake | 15 Feb 1980 | Australia Sydney | Sydney Australia |
| North Queensland Australia District | 3 Mar 1974 | Australia Brisbane North | Brisbane Australia |
| Northern Territory Australia District | 23 Jun 1974 | Australia Adelaide | Adelaide Australia |
| Orange Australia District | | Australia Sydney | Sydney Australia |
| Penrith Australia Stake | 19 Apr 1998 | Australia Sydney | Sydney Australia |
| Perth Australia Dianella Stake | 26 Nov 1967 | Australia Perth | Perth Australia |
| Perth Australia North Coast Stake | 12 Mar 1995 | Australia Perth | Perth Australia |
| Perth Australia Rockingham Stake | 15 Dec 1996 | Australia Perth | Perth Australia |
| Perth Australia Southern River Stake | 6 Jul 1980 | Australia Perth | Perth Australia |
| Riverina Australia Stake | 20 Oct 2019 | Australia Melbourne | Melbourne Australia |
| Sunshine Coast Australia Stake | 17 Nov 1996 | Australia Brisbane North | Brisbane Australia |
| Sydney Australia Baulkham Hills Stake | 27 Mar 1960 | Australia Sydney | Sydney Australia |
| Sydney Australia Fairfield Stake | 19 May 2013 | Australia Sydney | Sydney Australia |
| Sydney Australia Hebersham Stake | 15 Feb 1980 | Australia Sydney | Sydney Australia |
| Sydney Australia Mortdale Stake | 14 May 1967 | Australia Sydney | Sydney Australia |
| Sydney Australia North Stake | 2 Feb 1997 | Australia Sydney | Sydney Australia |
| Sydney Australia Prairiewood Stake | 1 May 2016 | Australia Sydney | Sydney Australia |

=== Missions ===
As of October 2016, there were 800 missionaries serving in the church's five missions in Australia.

| Mission | Organized |
|---|---|
| Australia Adelaide | 1 Aug 1968 |
| Australia Brisbane North | 25 Jul 1973 |
| Australia Brisbane South | 1 Jul 2026 |
| Australia Melbourne | 3 Jul 1955 |
| Australia Perth | 1 Jul 1975 |
| Australia Sydney | 30 Oct 1951 |

=== Temples ===

Temples in Australia

- = Operating
- = Under construction
- = Announced
- = Temporarily Closed

The Sydney Australia Temple was the first LDS temple built in Australia; it was dedicated on 20 September 1984. Four additional temples were dedicated between 2000 and 2003.

| 28. Sydney Australia Temple; Official website; News & images | |
| Location: Announced: Groundbreaking: Dedicated: Size: Style: | Carlingford, New South Wales, Australia; 2 April 1980 by Spencer W. Kimball; 13 August 1982 by Bruce R. McConkie; 20 September 1984 by Gordon B. Hinckley; 30,677 sq ft (2,850.0 m^{2}) on a 3-acre (1.2 ha) site Modern, single-spire design - designed by Emil B. Fetzer and R. Lindsay Little |
| 89. Adelaide Australia Temple; Official website; News & images | |
| Location: Announced: Groundbreaking: Dedicated: Size: Style: | Marden, South Australia, Australia; 17 March 1999 by Gordon B. Hinckley; 29 May 1999 by Vaughn J. Featherstone; 15 June 2000 by Gordon B. Hinckley; 10,700 sq ft (990 m^{2}) on a 6.94-acre (2.81 ha) site Classic modern, single-spire design - designed by Simon Drew |
| 90. Melbourne Australia Temple; Official website; News & images | |
| Location: Announced: Groundbreaking: Dedicated: Size: Style: Notes: | Wantirna South, Victoria, Australia; 30 October 1998 by Gordon B. Hinckley; 20 March 1999 by P. Bruce Mitchell; 16 June 2000 by Gordon B. Hinckley; 10,700 sq ft (990 m^{2}) on a 5.98-acre (2.42 ha) site Classic modern, single-spire design - designed by Warwick Tempany and Church A&E Services; In April 2024, the temple was closed for minor renovations. When it reopens, since the renovations are not considered major, no open house or rededication is planned. |
| 106. Perth Australia Temple; Official website; News & images | |
| Location: Announced: Groundbreaking: Dedicated: Size: Style: | Yokine, Western Australia, Australia; 11 June 1999 by Gordon B. Hinckley; 20 November 1999 by Kenneth Johnson; 20 May 2001 by Gordon B. Hinckley; 10,700 sq ft (990 m^{2}) on a 2.76-acre (1.12 ha) site Classic modern, single-spire design - designed by Christou Cassella & JEC |
| 115. Brisbane Australia Temple; Official website; News & images | |
| Location: Announced: Groundbreaking: Dedicated: Size: Style: | Kangaroo Point, Queensland, Australia; 20 July 1998 by Gordon B. Hinckley; 26 May 2001 by Kenneth Johnson; 15 June 2003 by Gordon B. Hinckley; 10,700 sq ft (990 m^{2}) on a 0.86-acre (0.35 ha) site Classic modern, single-spire design - designed by Phillips, Smith, Conwell |
| 346. Brisbane Australia South Temple (Announced); Official website; News & images | |
| Location: Announced: | Brisbane, Australia; 7 April 2024 by Russell M. Nelson |
| 376. Liverpool Australia Temple (Announced); Official website; News & images | |
| Location: Announced: | Liverpool, Australia; 6 April 2025 by Russell M. Nelson |

== See also ==
- The Church of Jesus Christ of Latter-day Saints membership statistics (South Pacific)
- Religion in Australia
