= Veracruz Mexico Temple =

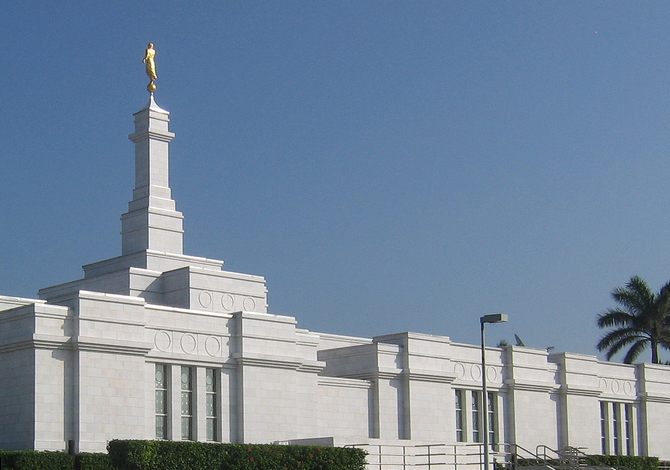
- Interactive map of Veracruz Mexico Temple
- Number: 93
- Dedication: 9 July 2000, by Thomas S. Monson
- Site: 3.39 acres (1.37 ha)
- Floor area: 10,700 ft^{2} (990 m^{2})
- Height: 71 ft (22 m)
- Official website • News & images

Church chronology
← Mérida Mexico Temple	Veracruz Mexico Temple	→ Baton Rouge Louisiana Temple

Additional information
- Announced: 14 April 1999, by Gordon B. Hinckley
- Groundbreaking: 29 May 1999, by Carl B. Pratt
- Open house: 26 June – 1 July 2000
- Current president: José A. González Ramos
- Designed by: Alvaro Inigo and Church A&E Services
- Location: Boca del Río, Veracruz, Mexico
- Coordinates: 19°8′3.875999″N 96°6′22.53600″W
- Exterior finish: Blanco Guardiano white marble from Torreón, Mexico
- Design: Classic modern, single-spire design
- Baptistries: 1
- Ordinance rooms: 2 (two-stage progressive)
- Sealing rooms: 2

The Veracruz Mexico Temple is a temple of the Church of Jesus Christ of Latter-day Saints in Boca del Río, Veracruz, Mexico. The intent to build the temple was announced by the First Presidency on April 14, 1999. It is the church's 93rd operating temple. The temple is on a 3.37-acre site less than half a kilometer from the Gulf of Mexico, with a meetinghouse also on the property. The building is 10,700 square feet and uses a classic modern design with the exterior being Blanco Guardiano white marble brought from Torreón, Mexico. The temple was designed by Alvaro Iñigo and church architectural personnel. A groundbreaking ceremony, to signify the beginning of construction, was held on May 29, 1999, conducted by Carl B. Pratt, a general authority and president of the Mexico South Area. The temple was dedicated during four sessions held on July 9, 2000, by Thomas S. Monson, with 5,171 church members in attendance.

== History ==
The building was announced by the First Presidency on April 14, 1999, the same day a temple was announced for Guadalajara, Mexico. A foundation of church membership in Veracruz began in 1955, when Rex E. Lee—later president of Brigham Young University—and his missionary companion, Walter Butler, opened Veracruz for missionary work. The first stake in Veracruz was created in 1975. By the time of the temple announcement, Veracruz had four stakes, with four more within a hundred-mile radius.

Prior to the construction in Veracruz, church members made significant sacrifices to travel to Mesa, Arizona, United States for temple worship.

=== Groundbreaking ===
The groundbreaking ceremony took place on May 29, 1999, at the temple site behind a beachfront area outside the city. Approximately 600 people attended the services, which were presided over by Carl B. Pratt, who was accompanied by Octaviano Tenorio, an area seventy and second counselor in the area presidency, and other church leaders. Stake and ward leaders from the eight stakes in the temple district attended the groundbreaking with their families, which included a choir from the Veracruz Mocambo Stake. Pratt was joined in the symbolic shovel-turning ceremony by Tenorio and presidents of four Veracruz stakes. The groundbreaking was also attended by a member baptized in the area in 1956, among the first 100 local church members.

The groundbreaking in Veracruz was held on the same day as those for the Adelaide Australia and Louisville Kentucky temples. In his remarks at the groundbreaking, Pratt spoke of the early members in Veracruz who understood the importance of the temple and sacrificed to travel to the temple in Arizona. Tenorio, referencing Moses 1:39 from the Pearl of Great Price, discussed the principle of eternal life and noted that families could endure through the eternities through temple ordinances if they are sealed.

=== Open house and dedication ===
After construction was completed, a public open house was held from June 26 to July 1, 2000, with 10,067 people touring the temple. For Meliton Lagunes, the first president of the Veracruz Mexico Temple, taking young people through the halls of the building was the highlight of the open house. Many youth who walked through the celestial room spoke of their desire to be married there.

The temple was dedicated on July 9, 2000, by Thomas S. Monson, first counselor in the First Presidency. Four dedicatory sessions were held, with 5,171 people participating over the course of the day. During heavy rain on the day of dedication, hundreds of members gathered outside while Monson conducted the cornerstone ceremony. Walter Butler, who along with Rex E. Lee, opened Veracruz for missionary work in 1955, traveled from Arizona to attend. He said the ceremony was moving and reflected emotionally on seeing a temple dedicated in the port city where he once served.

Monson was joined for the dedication by L. Tom Perry, of the Quorum of the Twelve Apostles, and Pratt. The Mérida Mexico Temple was dedicated the day before the one in Veracruz.

== Design and architecture ==
The building is a classic modern style with a single spire, designed by Alvaro Iñigo and church personnel. It serves church members in the eastern central coast of Mexico. The temple is on a 3.37-acre plot, includes a meetinghouse on the property, and is located in Boca del Río, less than half a kilometer from the Gulf of Mexico.

The building is 77 feet by 149 feet, a floor area of 10,700 square feet, and an exterior using Blanco Guardiano white marble from Torreón, Mexico. The same marble was used for the Guadalajara Mexico, Villahermosa Mexico, and San José Costa Rica temples. The single spire includes a statue of the angel Moroni on its top. The temple has two ordinance rooms, two sealing rooms, and a baptistry.

== Temple leadership and admittance ==
The church's temples are directed by a temple president and matron, each typically serving for a term of three years. The president and matron oversee the administration of temple operations and provide guidance and training for both temple patrons and staff. Serving from 2000 to 2003, Meliton Lagunes was the first president, with Juana V. de Lagunes serving as matron. Lagunes said that when he was called by church president Gordon B. Hinkley to be the temple president, Hinkley asked his age. Langunes said: "I told President Hinckley I was 67 — he told me, 'Why you're young; I'm 90!'" As of 2024, José A. Ramos is the president, with Sofía Arguelles Martínez de González serving as matron.

=== Admittance ===
After construction was completed, a public open house was held from June 26 to July 1, 2000. Like all the church's temples, it is not used for Sunday worship services. To members of the church, temples are regarded as sacred houses of the Lord. Once dedicated, only church members with a current temple recommend can enter for worship.

== See also ==
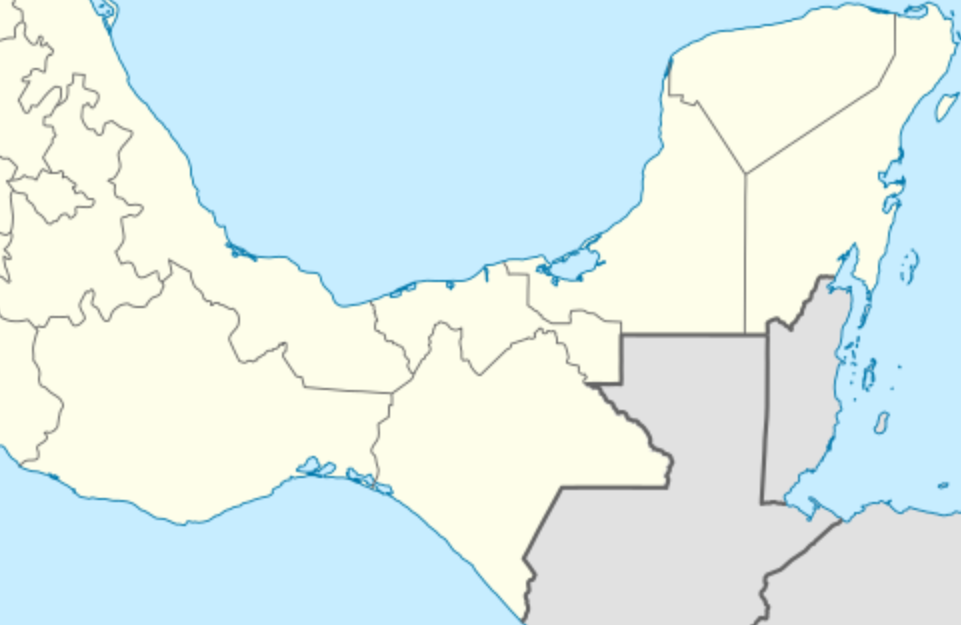

Temples in Southeast Mexico

Northwestern Mexico Temples
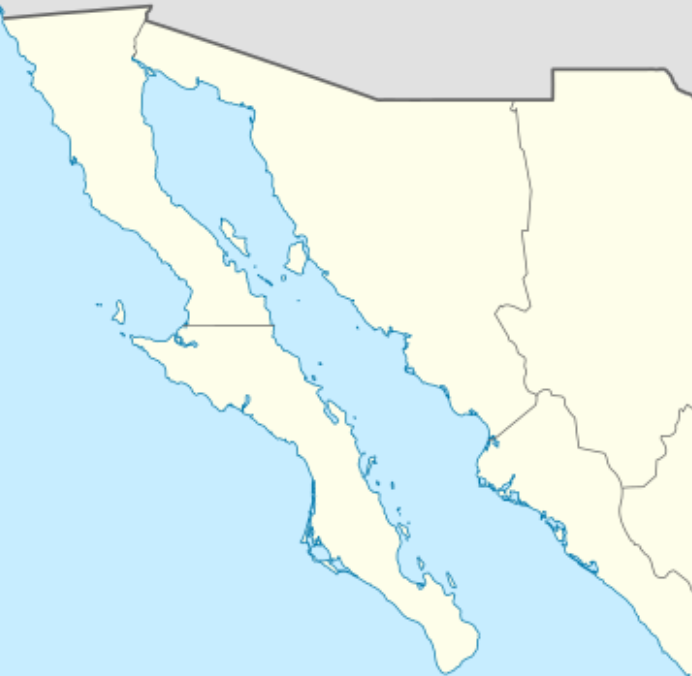
Temples in Northwestern Mexico
Northeastern Mexico Temples
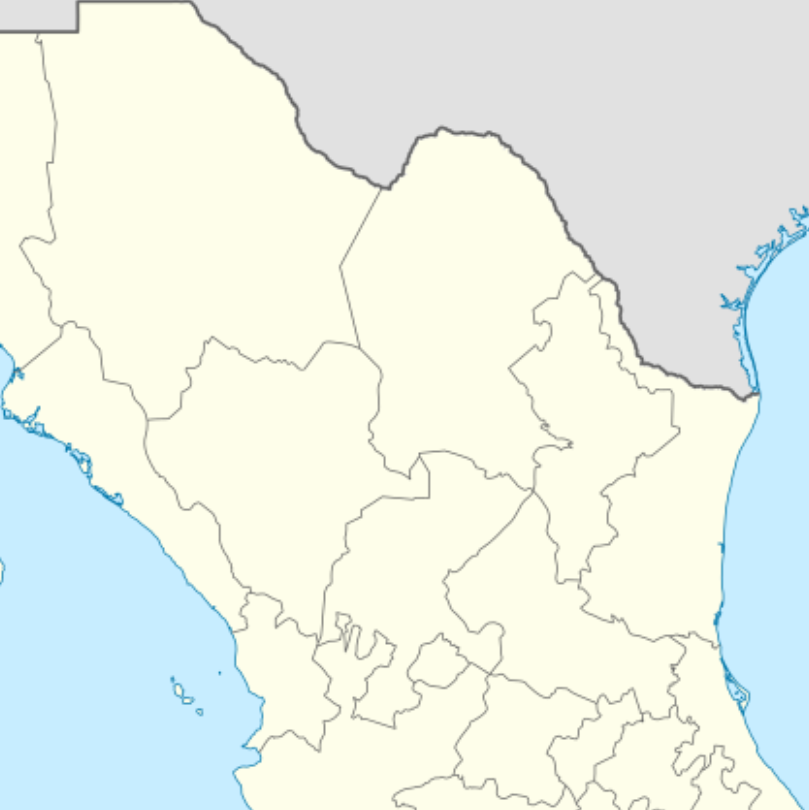
Temples in Northeastern Mexico
Central Mexico Temples
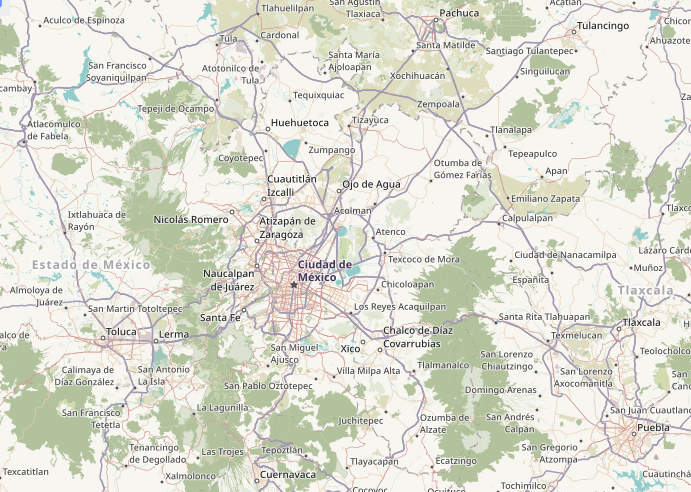
Temples in Central Mexico
Mexico Map
Temples in Mexico

= Operating
= Under construction
= Announced
= Temporarily Closed

- Comparison of temples of The Church of Jesus Christ of Latter-day Saints
- List of temples of The Church of Jesus Christ of Latter-day Saints
- List of temples of The Church of Jesus Christ of Latter-day Saints by geographic region
- Temple architecture (Latter-day Saints)
- The Church of Jesus Christ of Latter-day Saints in Mexico

== Additional reading ==
- "Dedication dates announced for temples in Mexico, U.S.", Church News, May 20, 2000
- Swensen, Jason (July 15, 2000), "Temple reflects generosity, beauty of Veracruz saints", Church News
