= Adelaide Australia Temple =

LDS Church temple in Australia

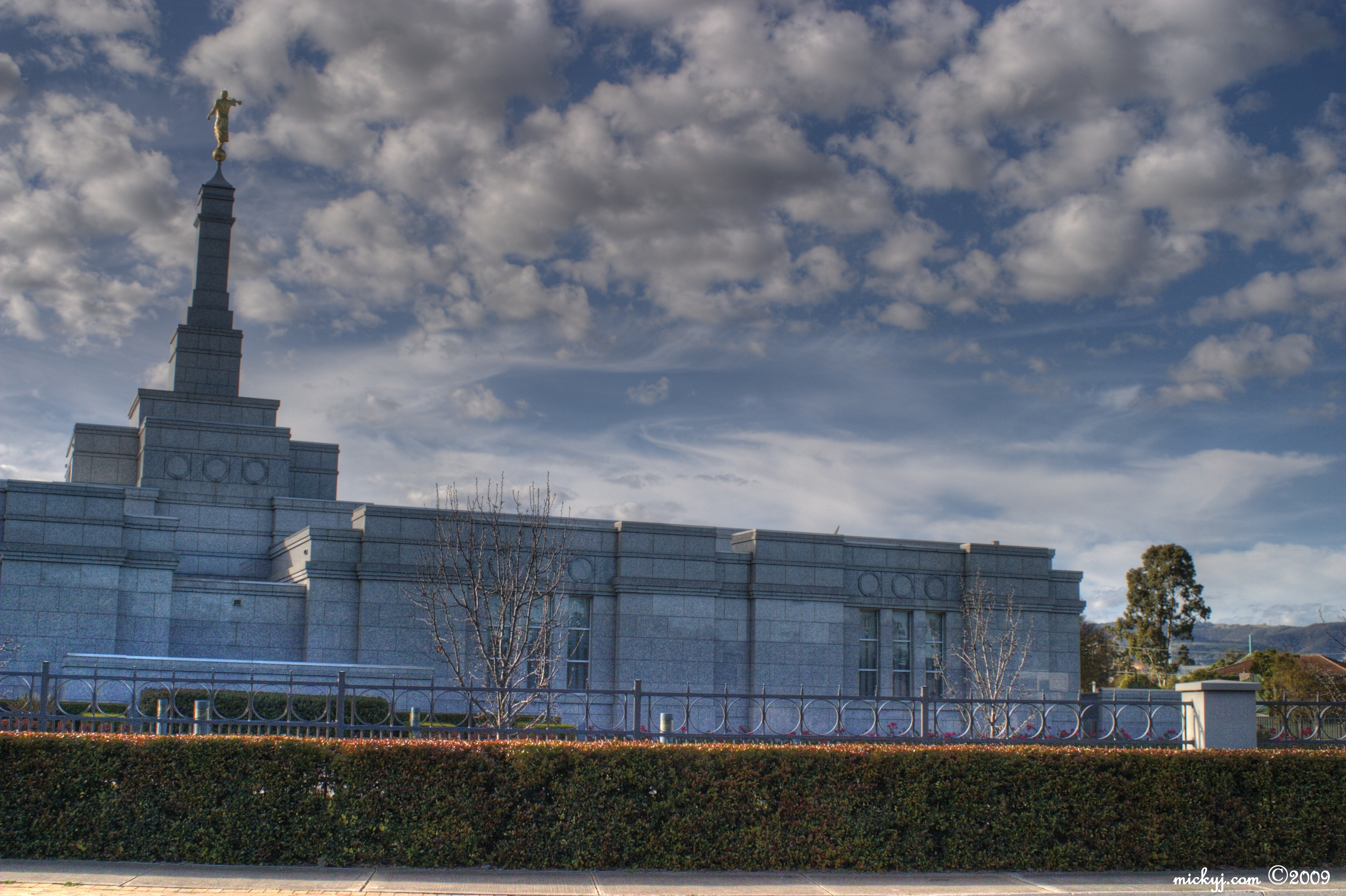
- Interactive map of Adelaide Australia Temple
- Number: 89
- Dedication: 15 June 2000, by Gordon B. Hinckley
- Site: 6.94 acres (2.81 ha)
- Floor area: 10,700 ft^{2} (990 m^{2})
- Height: 71 ft (22 m)
- Official website • News & images

Church chronology
| ← Fukuoka Japan Temple | Adelaide Australia Temple | → Melbourne Australia Temple |

Additional information
- Announced: 17 March 1999, by Gordon B. Hinckley
- Groundbreaking: 29 May 1999, by Vaughn J. Featherstone
- Open house: 3–10 June 2000
- Current president: Colin Wayne Clements
- Designed by: Simon Drew
- Location: Marden, South Australia, Australia
- Coordinates: 34°53′32.90280″S 138°38′6.007199″E
- Exterior finish: Snow-white granite of Campolonghi, Italy
- Design: Classic modern, single-spire design
- Baptistries: 1
- Ordinance rooms: 2 (two-stage progressive)
- Sealing rooms: 2

The Adelaide Australia Temple is a temple of the Church of Jesus Christ of Latter-day Saints located in the suburb of Marden in Adelaide, South Australia. It is the church's 89th operating temple and was the second built in Australia, after the Sydney Australia Temple. The temple has a single spire with a gold-leafed statue of the angel Moroni on top, and the exterior is snow-white granite from Campolonghi, Italy. Its design was overseen by architect Simon Drew and follows the same floor plan as the Melbourne Australia Temple. The intent to build the temple was announced on 17 March 1999, by the church's First Presidency. A groundbreaking ceremony was held on 29 May 1999, with Vaughn J. Featherstone, a general authority who was then president of the church's Australia/New Zealand Area. A public open house held after construction was completed had over 49,000 visitors. The temple was dedicated on 15 June 2000, by church president Gordon B. Hinckley. The temple has two ordinance rooms, two sealing rooms, and a baptistry.

== History ==
The temple was announced by the First Presidency on 17 March 1999. On 29 May 1999, the church announced that the temple would be built on a 6.94-acre (2.81 ha) property located at 53–59 Lower Portrush Road in Marden, a suburb of Adelaide, and be a single-story structure of approximately 10,700 square feet.

The groundbreaking ceremony took place on 29 May 1999, with Vaughn J. Featherstone presiding. Despite heavy rains, more than 500 people gathered for the groundbreaking, including the Mayor of Adelaide and other local dignitaries. After the program was finished, when they gathered at the temple site to break the ground, the rain stopped.

Following construction was completed, a public open house was held from 3 June to 10 June 2000, with approximately 49,300 people touring the temple.

The Adelaide Australia Temple was dedicated on 15 June 2000, by church president Gordon B. Hinckley. About 2,280 church members attended one of four dedicatory sessions.

Church members previously had to travel between fifteen and twenty hours one-way to visit the church's closest temple in Sydney. Membership growth in Australia prompted church leaders to announce new temples across Australia in the late 1990s. In addition to Adelaide, temples were constructed in Melbourne, Brisbane, and Perth. An additional temple for Brisbane south was announced in 2024.

In 2020, like all the church's others, the Adelaide Australia Temple was closed for a time in response to the COVID-19 pandemic.

== Design and architecture ==
The Adelaide Australia Temple has a modern, single-spire design. It was designed by Simon Drew, and construction was overseen by the firm Balderstone-Hornibrook. The temple has similarities to the Melbourne Australia temple, including exterior detailing, square footage, as well as sharing the same number of sealing and instruction rooms. The temples were dedicated a day apart. The interior is approximately 10,700 square feet (990 m^{2}) and has two endowment rooms, two sealing rooms, and a baptistry.

The temple is on a 6.94-acre (2.81 ha) site located at 53–59 Lower Portrush Road in Marden, a suburb northeast of central Adelaide. The landscaped grounds include gardens and trees, with plazas for gathering on four sides of the building.

The temple is a single-story building constructed primarily from snow-white granite imported from Campolonghi, Italy. A central architectural feature is its spire, with a gold-leafed statue of the angel Moroni on its top.

== Temple presidents ==
The church's temples are directed by a temple president and matron, each typically serving for a term of three years. The president and matron oversee the administration of temple operations and provide guidance and training for both temple patrons and staff. Serving from 2000 to 2003, Robert J. Wilmott was the first president, with Barbara B. Wilmott serving as matron. As of 2023, Michael W. McIlwaine is the president, with Caroline I. McIlwaine serving as matron.

== Admittance ==
After construction was completed, the church held public open house from 3 June to 10 June 2000 (excluding Sunday). The temple was dedicated by church president Gordon B. Hinckley on 15 June 2000, in four sessions.

Like all the church's temples, it is not used for Sunday worship services. To members of the church, temples are regarded as sacred houses of the Lord. Once dedicated, only church members with a current temple recommend can enter for worship.

== See also ==
- Comparison of temples of The Church of Jesus Christ of Latter-day Saints
- List of temples of The Church of Jesus Christ of Latter-day Saints
- List of temples of The Church of Jesus Christ of Latter-day Saints by geographic region
- Temple architecture (Latter-day Saints)
- The Church of Jesus Christ of Latter-day Saints in Australia

== Additional reading ==
- "Temple dates announced, postponed", Church News, 11 March 2000
- "Temple dedications planned", Church News, 8 April 2000
- "'Spiritual sanctuaries' for faithful Adelaide, Melbourne members", Church News, 24 June 2000
