= Fernando R. Gómez =

Fernando Rogelio Gómez Páez (born 1940) is the founder of the Museo de Historia del Mormonismo en Mexico, a museum about the history of restored gospel of Jesus Christ in Mexico. He has also held many regional leadership positions in The Church of Jesus Christ of Latter-day Saints. He and his co-director Sergio Pagaza gather artifacts and primary documents of Mormon history in Mexico.

Gomez has served in several leadership positions in the Church of Jesus Christ of Latter-day Saints. He was the second president of the church's Mérida México Temple and has also been the president of the Santiago, Chile Missionary Training Center. Gomez has also been the president of the church's México Mérida Mission and a regional representative.

Gomez was born in Monterrey, Mexico. Prior to founding the Museo de Historia del Mormonismo en Mexico, Gomez was president of an electronics firm. He has a bachelor's degree in electronical engineering from Brigham Young University (BYU), and has resided in Provo, Utah at various times. It was while he lived in the Philippines that he first came across his aunt's large collection of materials related to the history of The Church of Jesus Christ of Latter-day Saints in Mexico.

Gomez is the author of The Church of Jesus Christ of Latter-day Saints and the Lamanite Conventions: From Darkness to Light. He has given lectures at the David M. Kennedy Center for International Studies at BYU. He also contributed to the English commentary for the 2nd edition of F. Lamond Tullis' book Mormons in Mexico, including essays on "The States of México and Morelos: Their Contribution during the Re-opening Period of Missionary Work, 1901-03," "Margarito Bautista Valencia," "Francisco Narciso Sandoval: Lamanite Missionary," and "The Third Convention."

Gomez has more recently relocated his museum to Provo where it is now called Museum of Mormon History of the Americas. The Provo branch of the Museum was opened in 2011.

== Bibliography ==
- English commentary in dual-language 2nd edition of F. Lamond Tullis, Mormons in Mexico: Dynamics of Faith and Culture, Provo, Utah: El Museo de Historia del Mormonismo en México A.C., 1997. Spanish/English, 353 pp. No ISBN available. OCLC 56542522
- The Church of Jesus Christ of Latter-day Saints and the Lamanite Conventions: From Darkness to Light, Mexico City: El Museo de Historia del Mormonismo en México A.C., 2004. English, 47 pp. + 34 pp. photos and bibliography. Spanish, 47 pp. + 1 p. photos. No ISBN available. OCLC 57578080
