= Melbourne Australia Temple =

Temple of the Church of Jesus Christ of Latter-day Saints

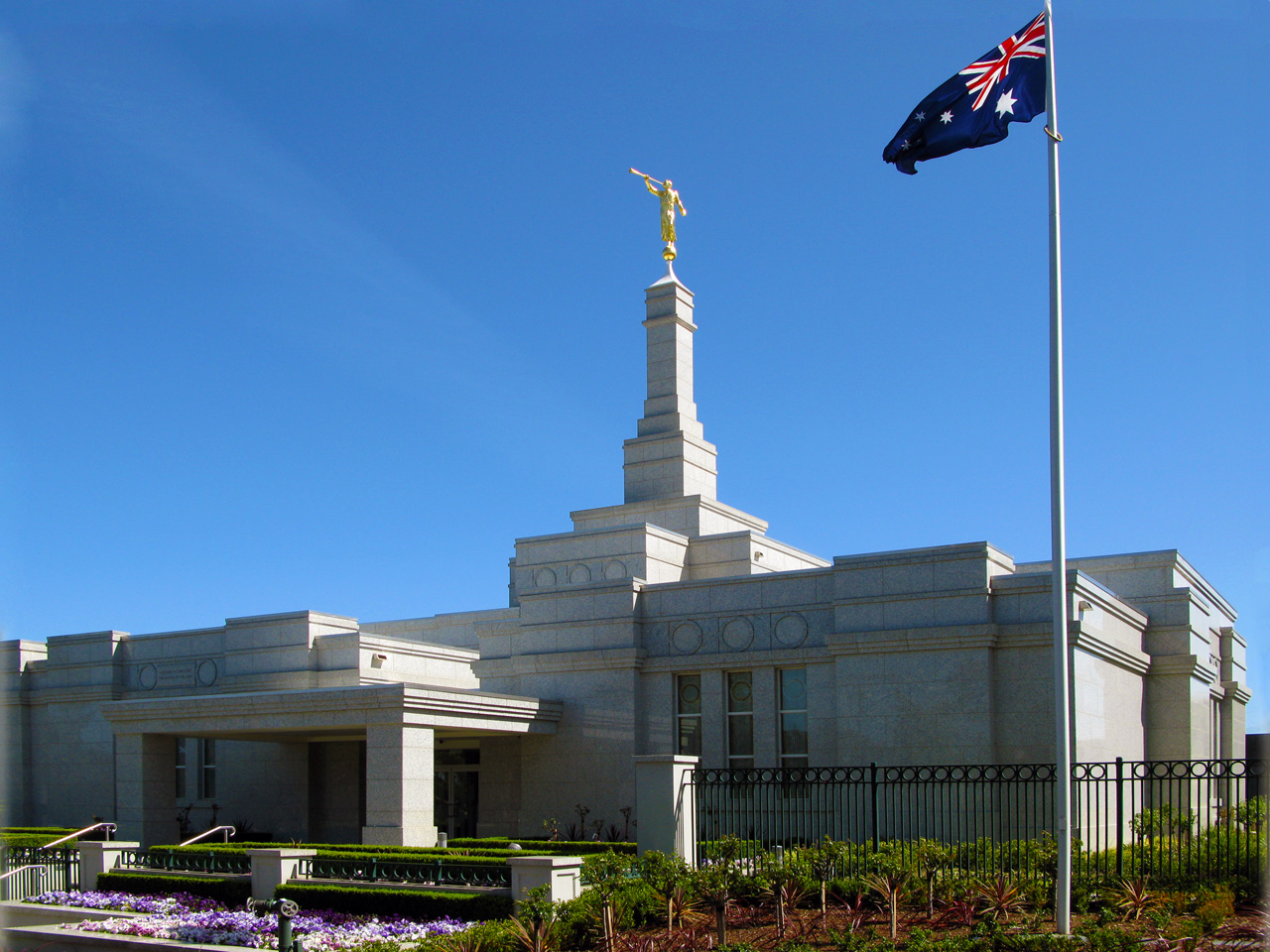
- Interactive map of Melbourne Australia Temple
- Number: 90
- Dedication: 16 June 2000, by Gordon B. Hinckley
- Site: 5.98 acres (2.42 ha)
- Floor area: 10,700 ft^{2} (990 m^{2})
- Height: 71 ft (22 m)
- Official website • News & images

Church chronology
← Adelaide Australia Temple	Melbourne Australia Temple	→ Suva Fiji Temple

Additional information
- Announced: 30 October 1998, by Gordon B. Hinckley
- Groundbreaking: 20 March 1999, by P. Bruce Mitchell
- Open house: 2–10 June 2000
- Current president: Afereti Iuli
- Designed by: Warwick Tempany and Church A&E Services
- Location: Wantirna South, Victoria, Australia
- Coordinates: 37°52′7.586400″S 145°12′45.43920″E
- Exterior finish: Snow white granite of Campolonghi, Italy
- Design: Classic modern, single-spire design
- Baptistries: 1
- Ordinance rooms: 2 (two-stage progressive)
- Sealing rooms: 2
- Notes: In April 2024, the temple was closed for minor renovations. When it reopens, since the renovations are not considered major, no open house or rededication is planned.

The Melbourne Australia Temple is located in Wantirna South, Melbourne, Victoria and is the 90th operating temple of the Church of Jesus Christ of Latter-day Saints. The intent to build the temple was announced on 30 October 1998, by the church's First Presidency. It is the first in both Melbourne and in Victoria and is one of five temples in Australia. Previously, church members from the area had travelled twelve hours one-way to the Sydney Australia Temple.

The temple has a single-spire design with a statue of the angel Moroni on top. It was constructed using snow-white granite and a modern architectural style. The temple site is 5.98 acres, which includes an adjacent meetinghouse. A groundbreaking ceremony, marking the commencement of construction, was held on 20 March 1999, with P. Bruce Mitchell, an area seventy presiding.

== History ==
The Melbourne Australia Temple was announced by the church's First Presidency on 30 October 1998. On the same day, the church said it would be constructed on a 5.98-acre property at the intersection of Cathies Lane and Pumps Lane in Wantirna South, a suburb in eastern Melbourne. Preliminary plans described a single-story structure of approximately 10,700 square feet (990 m^{2}), constructed from white granite imported from Campolonghi, Italy.

The temple's announcement was a significant milestone in the church's growing presence in the country. While missionary work in Australia was slow in the early decades, the church experienced rapid growth starting in the 1950s. In 1955, there were 3,000 members in Australia, and within five years, that number had increased to nearly 10,000. By 1970, membership had more than tripled to 32,000, and by 1980, it had reached 50,000. As of 2025, the church reports more than 150,000 members in Australia, making it the country's fastest growing Christian denomination. This growth increased the establishment of permanent religious infrastructure by the church, such as temples, to serve the spiritual needs of its members.

A groundbreaking ceremony, marking commencement of its construction, was conducted on 20 March 1999. P. Bruce Mitchell, an area seventy, presided over the event, which was attended by approximately 350 community leaders and church members. Mitchell expressed gratitude for community support and cooperation, noting the smooth approval and commencement of the construction process.

Throughout construction, the project experienced challenges, most notably delays caused by inclement weather conditions, which impacted the overall building schedule. Despite these setbacks, the efforts of members and construction teams enabled steady progress and timely completion of the temple.

After construction was complete, a public open house was held from 2 June to 10 June 2000, excluding Sundays. During this period, approximately 28,000 visitors toured the temple to learn about its religious significance and architecture. Distinguished visitors included Sir James Gobbo, the Governor of Victoria, who expressed admiration for the temple’s serene atmosphere and aesthetic beauty.

The Melbourne Australia Temple was dedicated on 16 June 2000, by church president Gordon B. Hinckley. More than 5,000 members from Victoria, Tasmania, and surrounding regions participated in the dedication, during four separate sessions. During the dedication ceremony, a commemorative "Jubilee" time capsule containing various memorabilia and messages was placed within its cornerstone, set to be reopened on the temple's 50th anniversary in 2050.

In 2020, like all those in the church, the Melbourne Australia Temple was closed for a time in response to the COVID-19 pandemic.

In April 2024, the temple closed for minor renovations, with an initial reopening date set for December 2024. As of April 2025, the temple remains closed, with the reopening expected on 12 May.

== Design and architecture ==
The temple has an architectural style with elements common to contemporary temples and was designed by the church’s architectural services, along with Warwick Tempany.

The temple is on a 5.98-acre (2.42 ha) site in Wantirna South, Melbourne. Its grounds feature manicured lawns, flowerbeds, and native Australian shrubbery. While there is no visitors' centre at the site, the landscaped area provides peaceful surroundings to enhance peace and reverence for visitors viewing its exterior.

The temple is a single-story building, prominently clad in snow-white granite sourced from Campolonghi, Italy. The exterior has a centrally positioned spire with a gold-leafed statue of the angel Moroni, symbolizing the restoration of the gospel and signifying an important theme in the church's teachings. The eastward orientation and upward-reaching spire symbolize the direction of Jesus Christ at the second coming. Additionally, the temple’s elevated site makes it a visible landmark, easily noticeable from Melbourne's EastLink freeway.

The temple's interior emphasizes simplicity, elegance, and spiritual purpose. The rooms feature fine woodwork, crystal chandeliers, and decorative glasswork with subtle Australian floral motifs, reflecting both regional aesthetics and religious symbolism. At the heart of the temple is the celestial room, a peaceful and beautifully decorated space intended for meditation and spiritual reflection. Additionally, the temple houses two ordinance rooms, two sealing rooms, and a baptistry, with a font resting upon twelve oxen statues, symbolizing the twelve tribes of Israel. Volunteers from the local community meticulously assembled the large chandelier in the celestial room, hanging each crystal individually.

== Renovation and community involvement ==
Since its dedication in 2000, the temple has not had major renovations or structural modifications. In April 2024, the temple temporarily closed to complete a minor interior refurbishment project. The scope of the project was limited, with no significant alterations made to its architectural design, structural elements, or exterior appearance.

The temple does not have an adjacent visitors' centre, but during its public open house held from 2 June to 10 June 2000, the approximately 28,000 visitors toured the building, including prominent civic leaders such as the Governor of Victoria, Sir James Gobbo, and Victorian Member of Parliament Ross Smith, both of whom praised its architectural beauty and peaceful atmosphere. The event raised local awareness and understanding of the church and positive interactions with community members from diverse backgrounds.

== Temple presidents ==
The church's temples are directed by a temple president and matron, each generally serving for a term of three years. The president and matron oversee the administration of temple operations and provide guidance and training for both temple patrons and staff.

Serving from 2000 to 2004, the first president of the Melbourne Australia Temple was Keith B. O’Grady, with Avis O’Grady serving as matron.. As of 2022, Andreas E. W. Schwabe is the president, with Janet K. Schwabe as matron.

== Admittance ==
A public open house of the temple was held from 2 June to 10 June 2000 (excluding Sundays). The temple was dedicated by Gordon B. Hinckley on 16 June 2000, in four dedicatory sessions, with 5,000 members attending.

Like all the church's temples, it is not used for Sunday worship services. To members of the church, temples are regarded as sacred houses of the Lord. Once dedicated, only church members with a current temple recommend can enter for worship.

== See also ==
- Comparison of temples of The Church of Jesus Christ of Latter-day Saints
- List of temples of The Church of Jesus Christ of Latter-day Saints
- List of temples of The Church of Jesus Christ of Latter-day Saints by geographic region
- Temple architecture (Latter-day Saints)
- The Church of Jesus Christ of Latter-day Saints in Australia

== Additional reading ==
- Kruckenberg, Janet (20 February 1999), "The announcements of new holy edifices bring joy and tears", Church News
- "Temple dates announced, postponed", Church News, 11 March 2000
- "Temple dedications planned", Church News, 8 April 2000
- "'Spiritual sanctuaries' for faithful Adelaide, Melbourne members", Church News, 24 June 2000
- "Facts and figures: Melbourne Australia Temple", Church News, 24 June 2000
