= Robert E. Sackley =

Australian Canadian LDS Church leader (1922–1993)

First Quorum of the Seventy
- 2 April 1988 – 1 April 1989
- End reason: Transferred to Second Quorum of the Seventy

Second Quorum of the Seventy
- 1 April 1989 – 22 February 1993

Personal details
- Born: Robert Edward Sackley; 17 December 1922; Lismore, New South Wales, Australia
- Died: 22 February 1993 (aged 70); Surfers Paradise, Queensland, Australia
- Spouse(s): Marjorie Orth
- Children: 5

Robert Edward Sackley (17 December 1922 – 22 February 1993) was an educational administrator in Canada and was a general authority of the Church of Jesus Christ of Latter-day Saints (LDS Church) from 1989 until his death. Sackley was the first Australian to serve as an LDS Church general authority.

== Second World War ==
Born in Lismore, New South Wales, Australia, Sackley was a member of the Northern New Guinea 5th Commando Squadron of the Australian Defence Force during the Second World War. On 25 December 1944, Sackley was severely wounded in a Japanese ambush in New Guinea. He was rescued by native New Guinean tribesmen and carried for six days to an American encampment. Sackley was transferred to Greenslopes hospital in Brisbane, Queensland, where it was discovered that he had also contracted malaria.

== Conversion, marriage and family ==
While recovering in the hospital, Sackley became friends with Marjorie Orth, a Latter-day Saint who was visiting a friend. Orth invited Sackley to attend her church services, and Sackley became interested in the LDS Church. He was baptized into the LDS Church on 16 June 1946. Sackley and Orth were married on 26 March 1947 and were the parents of five children.

== Emigration to Canada ==
Shortly thereafter, the Sackleys decided that they would visit Canada in order to be sealed in an LDS Church temple. (The closest temple at the time was in Hawaii, but due to restricted US entry they chose to move to Alberta, Canada. There were also temples in the continental United States, but the Sackleys had difficulty obtaining visas.) The Sackleys went to Alberta and were sealed in the Cardston Alberta Temple. In order to pay for their trip the Sackleys sold all they owned in Australia, they embarked on a steamer leaving everything behind, acting on faith in their goal to seal their family together.

After their sealing, the Sackleys decided to settle in Cardston. Sackley worked as an accountant for a grocery company and as a business administrator for Cardston's school district.

Schooling and other employment opportunities moved the Sackley family to Logan and Provo in Utah as well as Edmonton, Alberta. From Edmonton, Sackley was offered a position as the vice president of administration of Medicine Hat College in Medicine Hat, Alberta. Sackley accepted the position and in 1973 became the president of the college. During this time, Sackley also served as an LDS bishop in Medicine Hat.

== Full-time church service ==
In 1979, Sackley resigned as president of the college to become the first president of the church's Philippines Quezon City Mission. In 1982, immediately following his three-year term as a mission president, Sackley was asked to become the administrative assistant to the president of the Salt Lake Temple in Salt Lake City, Utah. In 1983, Sackley and his wife became the directors of the visitors' center at the Washington, D.C. Temple in Kensington, Maryland. In 1985, the Sackleys were served as missionaries in the newly constructed Sydney Australia Temple. In 1986, Sackley was again assigned as a mission president, this time for the church's Nigeria Lagos Mission.

On 2 April 1988, Sackley became a member of the church's First Quorum of the Seventy. One year later, he was transferred to the newly created Second Quorum of the Seventy. Sackley was the first native Australian to serve as an LDS Church general authority. As a general authority, he served in the presidency of a number of the church's areas and was managing director of the church's Missionary Department. Sackley died in Surfers Paradise, near Brisbane, Queensland, Australia, while he was serving as a counselor in the presidency of Pacific Area, which was headquartered in Sydney.
