= Guadalajara Mexico Temple =

Mormon temple

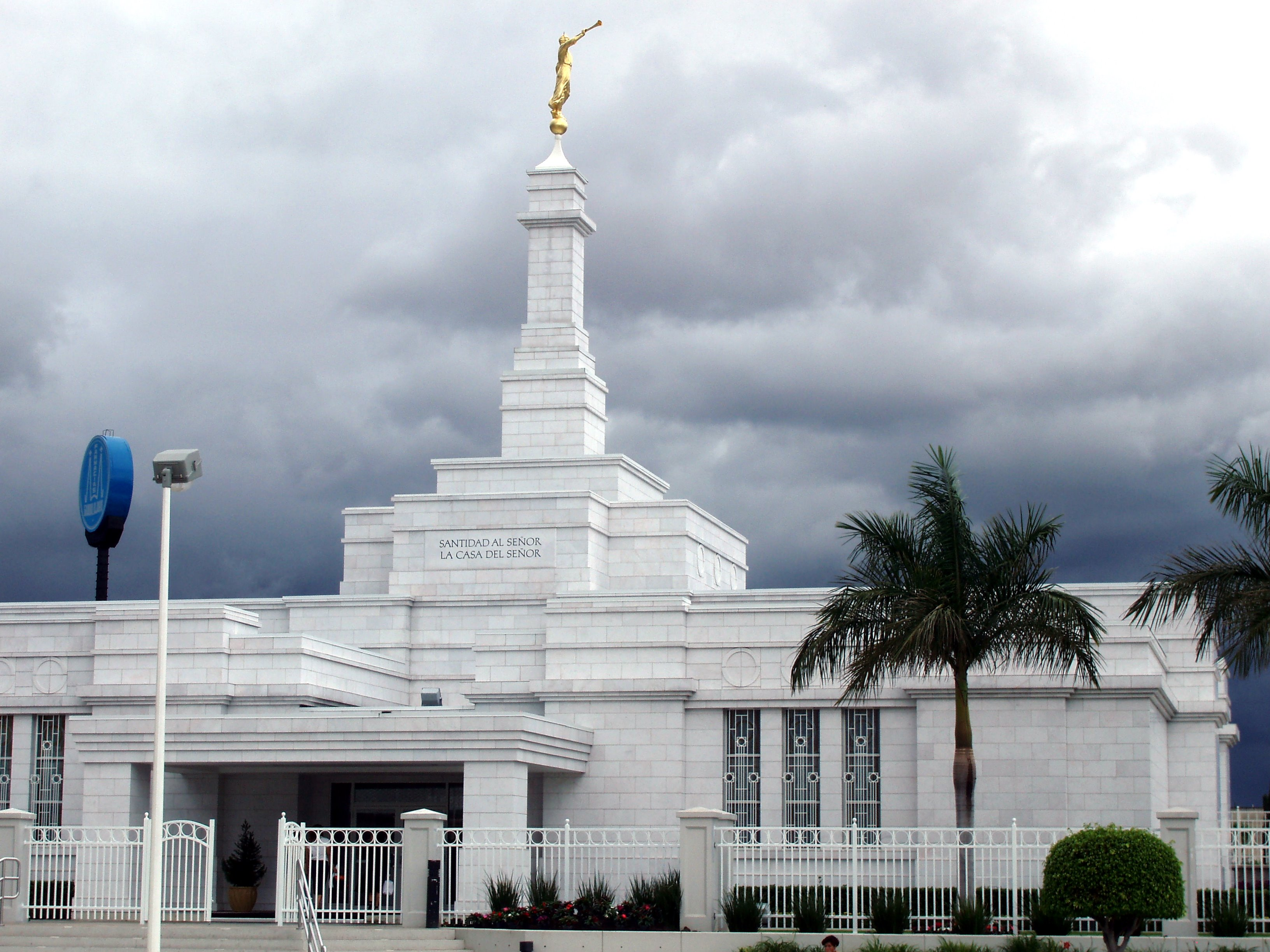
- Interactive map of Guadalajara Mexico Temple
- Number: 105
- Dedication: 29 April 2001, by Gordon B. Hinckley
- Site: 2.69 acres (1.09 ha)
- Floor area: 10,700 ft^{2} (990 m^{2})
- Height: 71 ft (22 m)
- Official website • News & images

Church chronology
← Winter Quarters Nebraska Temple	Guadalajara Mexico Temple	→ Perth Australia Temple

Additional information
- Announced: 14 April 1999, by Gordon B. Hinckley
- Groundbreaking: 12 June 1999, by Eran A. Call
- Open house: 14–21 April 2001
- Current president: Efrén Zamora Martínez
- Designed by: Alvaro Inigo and Church A&E Services
- Location: Zapopan, Mexico
- Coordinates: 20°39′41.57999″N 103°25′23.05199″W
- Exterior finish: Blanco Guardiano white marble from Torreón, Mexico
- Design: Classic modern, single-spire design
- Baptistries: 1
- Ordinance rooms: 2 (two-stage progressive)
- Sealing rooms: 2

The Guadalajara Mexico Temple is a temple of the Church of Jesus Christ of Latter-day Saints in Zapopan, Jalisco, Mexico. The intent to build the temple was announced in a letter to local priesthood leaders on April 14, 1999, by the First Presidency. It is the church's 105th operating temple and the 11th temple built in Mexico, located in the country's second-largest city. The building is 71 feet tall and has a single spire with a statue of the angel Moroni on it stop, and an exterior of white marble from Torreón, Mexico. A groundbreaking ceremony, to signify the beginning of construction, was held on June 12, 1999, conducted by Eran A. Call, a general authority and president of the church's Mexico North Area. The temple was dedicated by church president Gordon B. Hinckley on April 29, 2001, his 64th wedding anniversary.

== History ==
The temple was announced by the First Presidency on April 14, 1999, in a letter sent to local priesthood leaders. This was the same day the Veracruz Mexico Temple was announced.

The groundbreaking ceremony took place on June 12, 1999, marking the commencement of construction. This ceremony was presided over by Eran A. Call, a General Authority Seventy and president of the Mexico North Area. At the groundbreaking, Call reflected on his connection to the area, noting that he had served as mission president in Guadalajara 29 years earlier, when there were only four small branches. By 1999, membership had grown to eight stakes in the city.

=== Early church growth ===
The church's presence in Guadalajara developed more gradually than in other Mexican cities. The first stake in Guadalajara was organized in 1975, with Emilio Garcia called as the first stake president by Marvin J. Ashton of the Quorum of the Twelve Apostles. This was 14 years after Mexico City received its first stake. Guadalajara, often referred to as the most Mexican of all Mexican cities and home to Mariachi music, held firmly to religious traditions that made missionary work challenging in the early years. Prior to the temple's completion, members from Guadalajara traveled long distances to participate in temple ordinances. Garcia and his family made a memorable journey to the Mesa Arizona Temple in 1968 to be sealed, using their last funds for transportation with nothing left for food; church members in Nogales, Arizona, provided them with sandwiches for both their arrival and return journey.

=== Open house and dedication ===
After construction was completed, a public open house was held from April 14 to April 21, 2001, excluding Sunday. During the open house, over 13,000 people visited the temple. The open house generated 840 missionary referrals, leading local members to call the temple "Guadalajara's top missionary." The response during the open house was described as emotional, with visitors expressing feelings of peace and spirituality; some visitors emerged from tours crying and embracing others, recognizing the temple as a special place. The temple quickly became recognizable in the city; even during construction, taxi drivers in Guadalajara did not need directions to find it, stating that its beauty preceded its message.

The Guadalajara Mexico Temple was dedicated on April 29, 2001, by church president Hinckley. Four sessions were held, with approximately 6,520 members attending. The dedication was held on the 64th wedding anniversary of Hinckley and his wife, Marjorie. Henry B. Eyring, of the Quorum of the Twelve Apostles, and members of the area presidency were also in attendance.

In 2020, like all the church's others, the Guadalajara Mexico Temple was closed for a time in response to the COVID-19 pandemic.

== Design and architecture ==
The temple was designed by architect Alvaro Inigo and the church's architectural and engineering services team. The building has a classic modern, single-spire design that was used for several dozen temples built during this era. This temple was part of Hinckley's initiative to construct smaller, more accessible temples to serve members who lived far from existing temples. The structure was constructed by Impulsa Construction, with John Webster serving as project manager.

The temple is on a 2.69-acre site in the Jardines Tepeyac neighborhood of Zapopan, a municipality adjacent to Guadalajara. It is located near Guadalajara's commercial district and has become a landmark in the surrounding area. The temple serves members from 18 stakes and 5 districts headquartered in Jalisco, Aguascalientes, Guanajuato, Michoacán, Zacatecas, Colima, Nayarit, and Sinaloa.

The structure is 71 feet tall and measures 77 feet by 149 feet, with a total floor area of 10,700 square feet. The exterior has Blanco Guardiano white marble from Torreón, Mexico. The temple has a single attached spire with an angel Moroni on its top.

The temple has two instruction rooms arranged in a two-stage progressive format, two sealing rooms, and a baptistry.

== Temple leadership and admittance ==
The church's temples are directed by a temple president and matron, each typically serving for a term of three years. The president and matron oversee the administration of temple operations and provide guidance and training for both temple patrons and staff.

Serving from 2001 to 2004, Emilio Garcia, the area's first stake president called in 1975, was the first president, with Elvira Garcia serving as matron. As of 2025, Efrén Zamora Martínez is the president, with Mireya E. de Zamora serving as matron.

=== Admittance ===
On April 10, 2001, the church announced the public open house that was held from April 14 to April 21, 2001. Like all the church's temples, it is not used for Sunday worship services. To members of the church, temples are regarded as sacred houses of the Lord. Once dedicated, only church members with a current temple recommend can enter for worship.

== See also ==
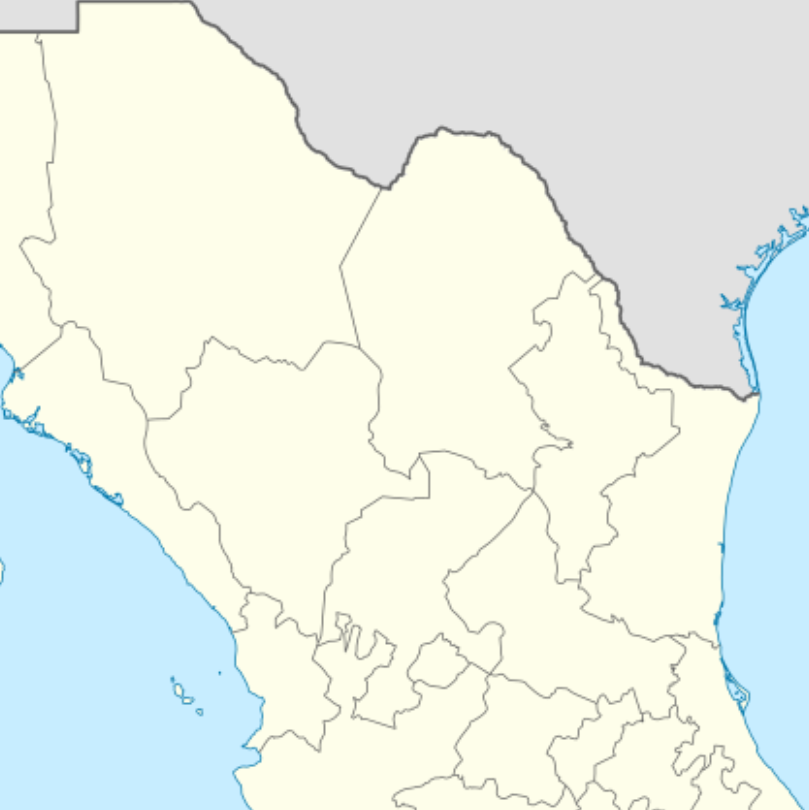

Temples in Northeastern Mexico

Northwest Mexico Temples
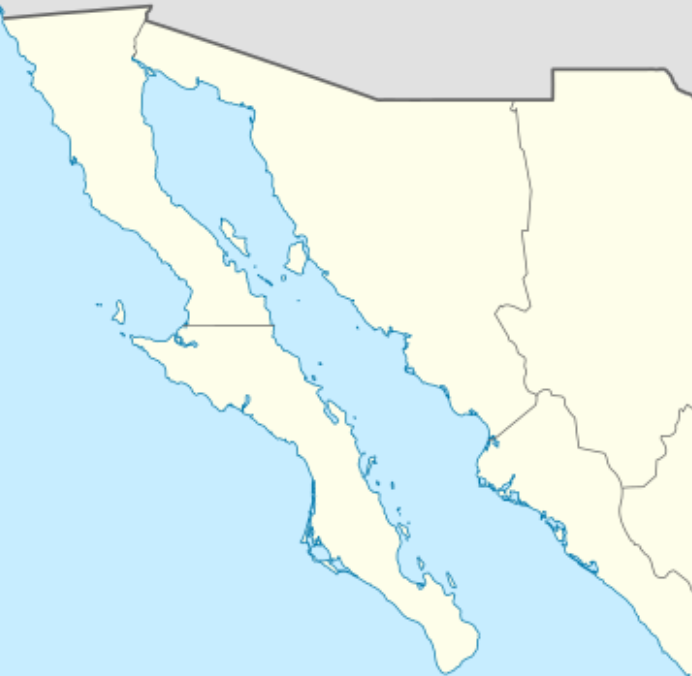
Temples in Northwestern Mexico
Central Mexico Temples
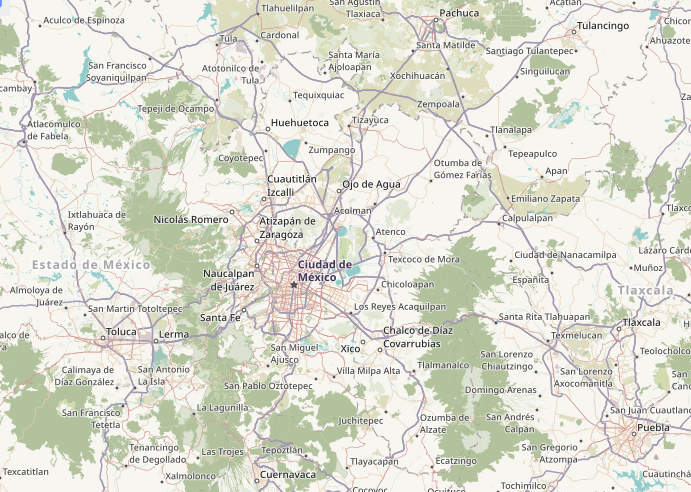
Temples in Central Mexico
Southeast Mexico Temples
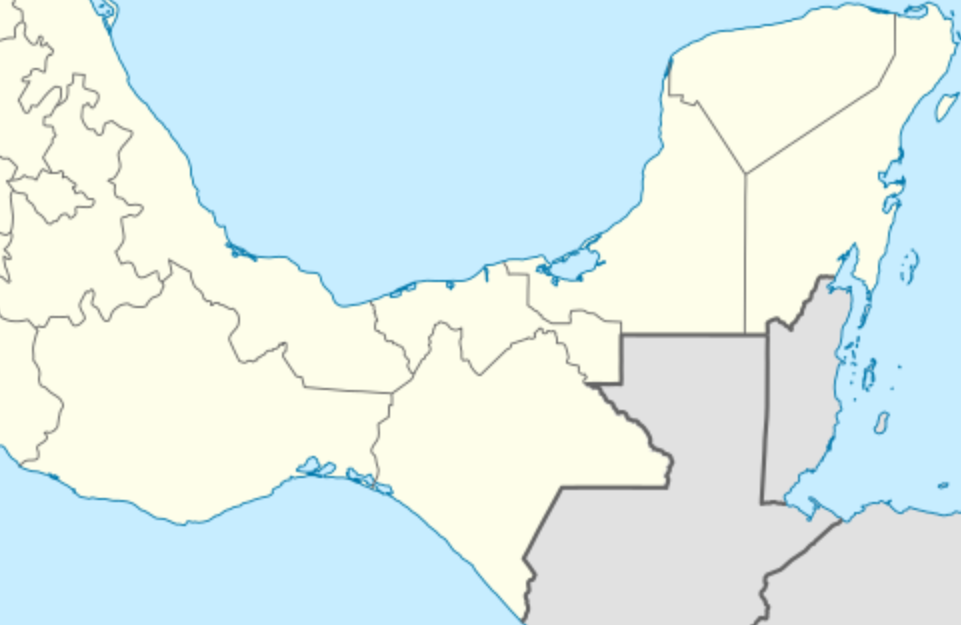
Temples in Southeast Mexico
Mexico Map
Temples in Mexico

= Operating
= Under construction
= Announced
= Temporarily Closed

- Comparison of temples of The Church of Jesus Christ of Latter-day Saints
- List of temples of The Church of Jesus Christ of Latter-day Saints
- List of temples of The Church of Jesus Christ of Latter-day Saints by geographic region
- Temple architecture (Latter-day Saints)
- The Church of Jesus Christ of Latter-day Saints in Mexico
