= Mérida Mexico Temple =

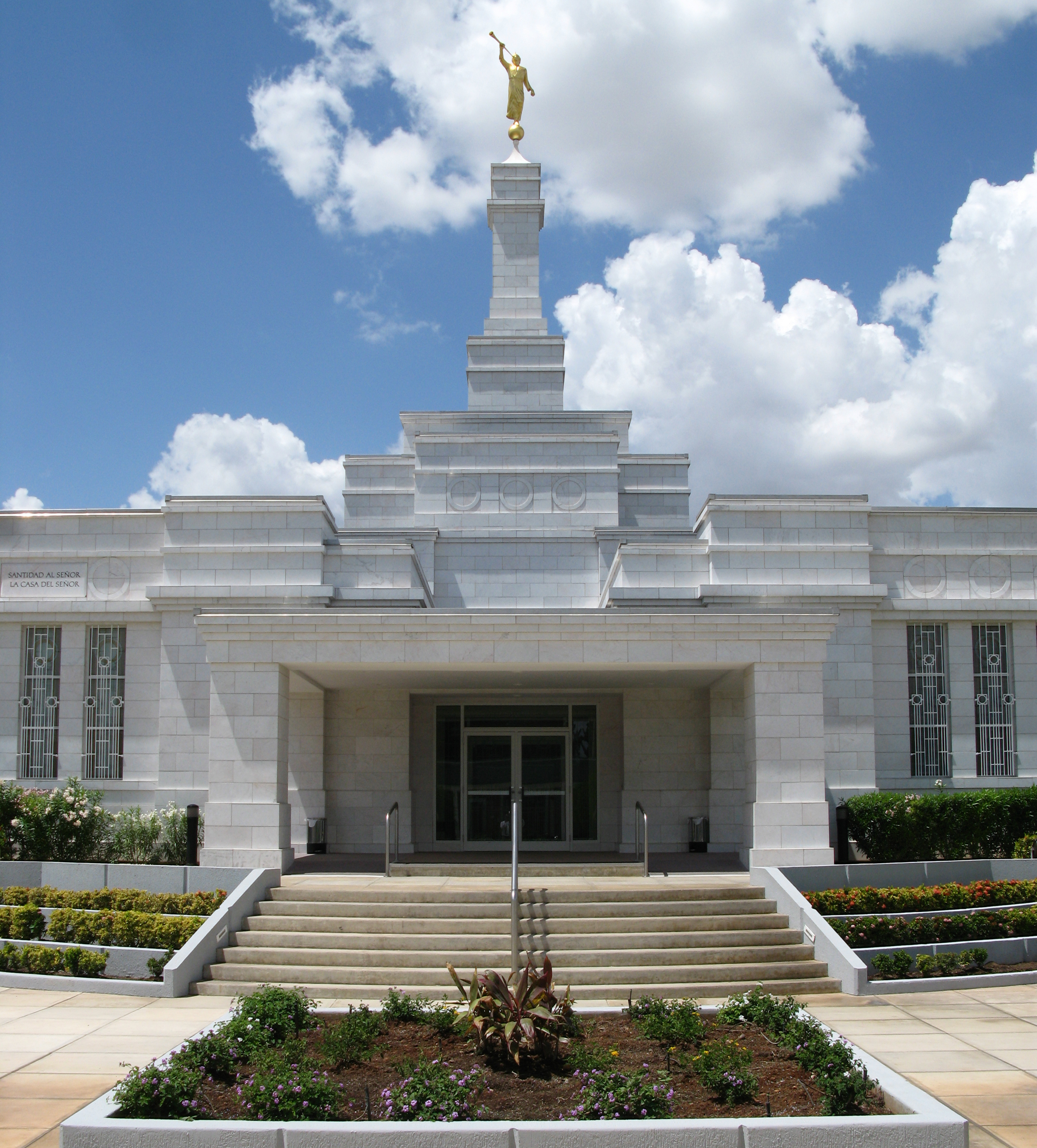
- Interactive map of Mérida Mexico Temple
- Number: 92
- Dedication: 8 July 2000, by Thomas S. Monson
- Site: 1.53 acres (0.62 ha)
- Floor area: 10,700 ft^{2} (990 m^{2})
- Height: 71 ft (22 m)
- Official website • News & images

Church chronology
← Suva Fiji Temple	Mérida Mexico Temple	→ Veracruz Mexico Temple

Additional information
- Announced: 25 September 1998, by Gordon B. Hinckley
- Groundbreaking: 16 January 1999, by Carl B. Pratt
- Open house: 24 June – 1 July 2000
- Current president: Juan Galán Hernández
- Designed by: Alvaro Inigo and Church A&E Services
- Location: Mérida, Yucatán, Mexico
- Coordinates: 20°57′56.82239″N 89°37′51.81960″W
- Exterior finish: Blanco Guardiano white marble from Torreón, Coahuila
- Design: Classic modern, single-spire design
- Baptistries: 1
- Ordinance rooms: 2 (two-stage progressive)
- Sealing rooms: 2

The Mérida Mexico Temple is the 92nd operating temple of the Church of Jesus Christ of Latter-day Saints, and is located in Mérida, Yucatán, Mexico. The intent to build the temple was announced on September 25, 1998, by the First Presidency. The temple is the first in the Yucatán Peninsula and the ninth in Mexico. The temple has a single spire with a statue of the angel Moroni. The structure was designed by architect Alvaro Inigo and church architectural personnel, using a classic modern design and Guardiano white marble from Torreón, Mexico. A groundbreaking ceremony, to signify the beginning of construction, was held on January 16, 1999, conducted by Carl B. Pratt, a general authority and president of the church's Mexico South Area. Thomas S. Monson, first counselor in the First Presidency, dedicated the temple on July 8, 2000, the day before the Veracruz Mexico Temple dedication.

== History ==
The church established a presence in the Yucatán Peninsula on February 7, 1959, when the region was dedicated for missionary work. The temple was announced by the First Presidency on September 25, 1998.

On January 16, 1999, a groundbreaking ceremony was held on the 1.53-acre property located at Calle 70, number 527, between streets 65 and 67 in Colonia Centro in Mérida. The ceremony was attended by approximately 550 people, and took place on the same day as the groundbreaking for the Memphis Tennessee Temple. Carl B. Pratt, a general authority and president of the Mexico South Area, presided at the ceremony. Pratt expressed his desire to establish a culture of temple attendance in the region, stating that the construction would strengthen homes, marriages, and bring peace to the Yucatán Peninsula.

Fermin Herrera, president of the Mérida Central Stake, spoke at the groundbreaking about the eternal hope members had received through the temple. Abel Ordaz, the first president of the Mérida stake, recalled the 1959 dedication of the first meetinghouse and later dedication of the first stake center. Church members in the Yucatán Peninsula had previously traveled long distances to attend temple services, sometimes requiring four days of travel to reach a temple, four days of worship, and four days to return home. During one such trip, a bus carrying members tumbled into a gully along the highway, though no one was severely injured. They also recounted that three men planned to rob the bus, but after the accident, they walked away.

The preliminary plans called for a single-story structure of 10,700 square feet. The project manager was Dean Fife, with PyCSA and Okland Construction Company serving as contractors. Following construction, the church held a public open house from June 24 to July 1, 2000, where approximately 14,150 visitors toured the building.

The Mérida Mexico Temple was dedicated on July 8, 2000, by Thomas S. Monson, first counselor in the First Presidency. Four dedicatory sessions were held, with a total of 5,478 church members in attendance. It was dedicated the day before the Veracruz Mexico Temple.

== Design and architecture ==
The building uses classic modern architecture, as designed by Alvaro Inigo and church personnel. The temple is on a 1.31-acre site in the Yucatán, on the north end of the Yucatán Peninsula near the Gulf of Mexico, in the heart of Mesoamerica amid renowned archaeological ruins including Uxmal and Chichén Itzá.

The structure is one story, is 77 feet by 149 feet, with a total floor area of 10,700 square feet. The exterior uses Guardiano white marble from Torreón, Mexico. It has a single spire with an angel Moroni statue on its top.

The temple has two ordinance rooms, two sealing rooms, and a baptistry. As of 2010, the temple served nine stakes, two districts, and three branches on Yucatan Peninsula.

A distinctive feature of the temple is its quarterly endowment sessions conducted in the Mayan language. Church members of Mayan descent who are fluent in the language travel from rural communities such as Valladolid, Motul, Baca, Izamal, Uayma, and Ticul to participate in temple ordinances in their ancestral language. Fernando R. Gómez, a previous temple president, wrote about member Sixta Martinez, who joined the church in 1974. She saved pesos in a milk can to afford bus fare for her family's six-day journey to the temple in Mesa, Arizona so she could be sealed. After the Mérida Mexico Temple was dedicated, instead of saving for a trip yearly, she was able to attend the temple weekly.

== Temple leadership and admittance ==
=== Temple leadership ===
The church's temples are directed by a temple president and matron, each typically serving for a term of three years. The president and matron oversee the administration of temple operations and provide guidance and training for both temple patrons and staff. Serving from 2000 to 2001, Nefi Treviño was the first president, with Rosa E. de Treviño serving as matron. Fernando R. Gómez served as president from 2001 to 2004, with his wife, Enriqueta Pia Gomez, serving as matron. He had been the co-founder and president of a museum for church history in Mexico, dating back to when it was the Republic of Mexico. As of February 2025, Juan Galán Hernández is the president, with Sidya Elizabeth Andrade Santoyo de Galán serving as matron.

=== Admittance ===
From June 24 to July 1, 2000, the church held a public open house. Like all the church's temples, it is not used for Sunday worship services. To members of the church, temples are regarded as sacred houses of the Lord. Once dedicated, only church members with a current temple recommend can enter for worship.

== See also ==
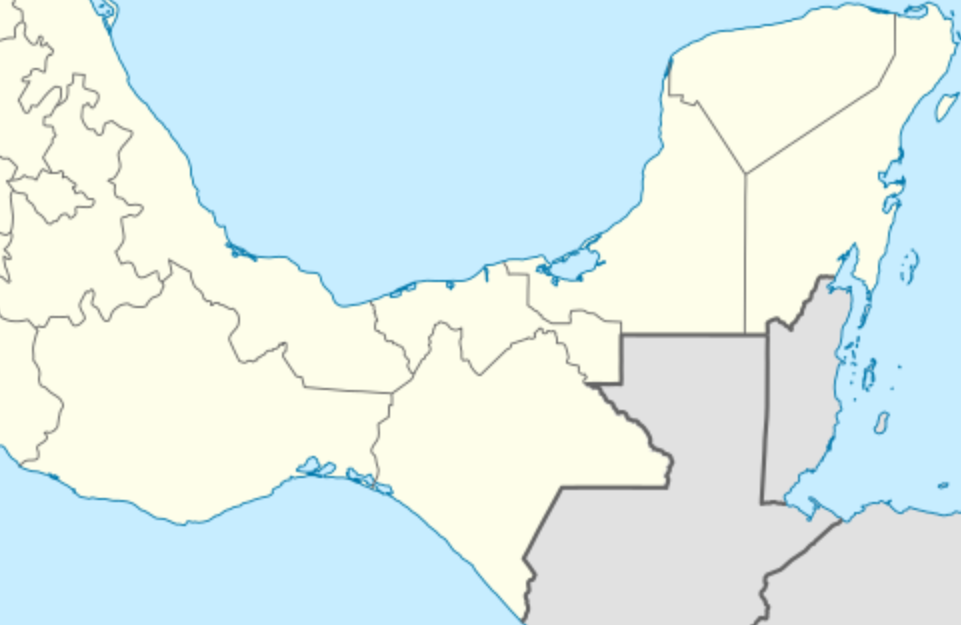

Temples in Southeast Mexico

Northwestern Mexico Temples
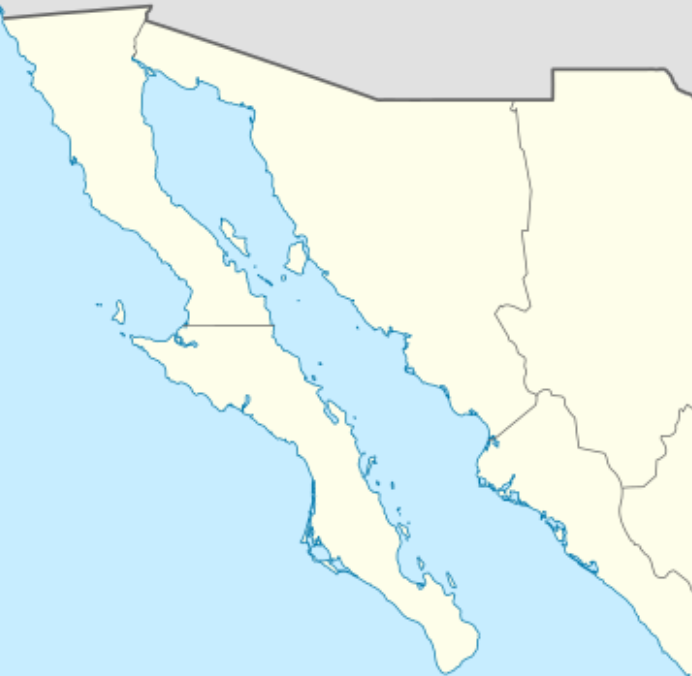
Temples in Northwestern Mexico
Northeastern Mexico Temples
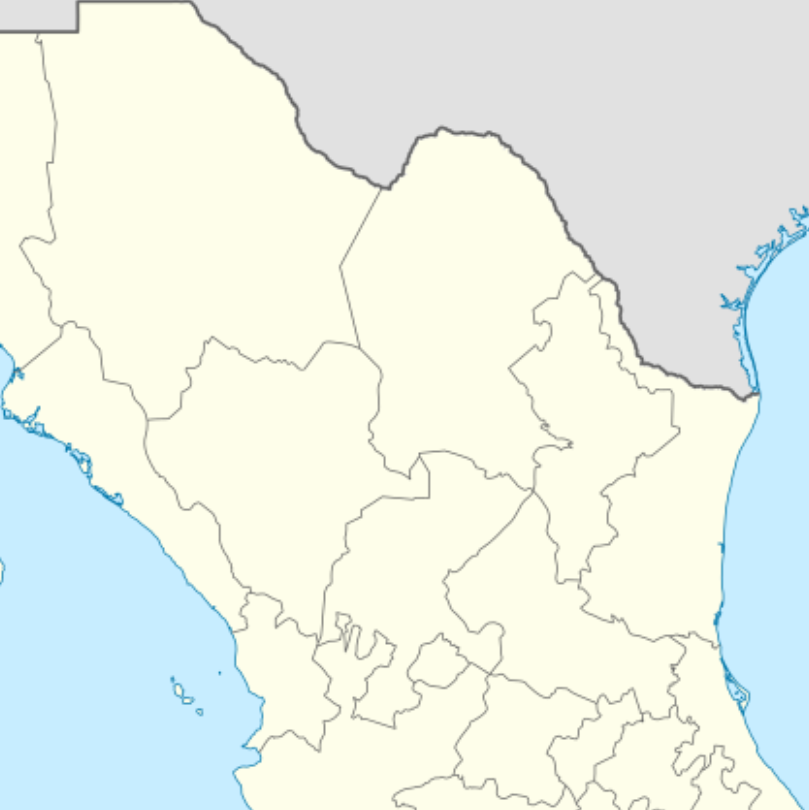
Temples in Northeastern Mexico
Central Mexico Temples
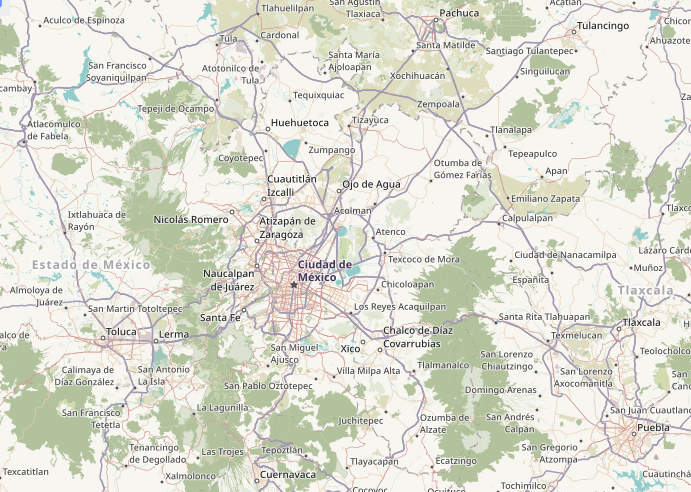
Temples in Central Mexico
Mexico Map
Temples in Mexico

= Operating
= Under construction
= Announced
= Temporarily Closed

- Comparison of temples of The Church of Jesus Christ of Latter-day Saints
- List of temples of The Church of Jesus Christ of Latter-day Saints
- List of temples of The Church of Jesus Christ of Latter-day Saints by geographic region
- Temple architecture (Latter-day Saints)
- The Church of Jesus Christ of Latter-day Saints in Mexico

== Additional reading ==
- Swensen, Jason (July 15, 2000), "Modern temple rises among Mayan ruins", Church News
- "Yucatan clean-up project", Church News, Jan 5, 2002
- Gomez, Fernando (Nov 16, 2002), "Faith of a Mayan rewarded", Church News
- "Yucatan pioneers led way to great work", Church News, March 6, 2004
- "Temple moments: Temple for Mayans", Church News, April 17, 2004
