= Octaviano Tenorio =

Authority of LDS Church (born 1942)

First Quorum of the Seventy
- 31 March 2007 – October 6, 2012
- Called by: Gordon B. Hinckley
- End reason: Designated an emeritus general authority

Emeritus General Authority
- October 6, 2012
- Called by: Thomas S. Monson

Personal details
- Born: Octaviano Tenorio Domínguez; 31 October 1942 (age 83); Tilapan, Veracruz, Mexico

Octaviano Tenorio Domínguez (born 31 October 1942) has been a general authority of the Church of Jesus Christ of Latter-day Saints (LDS Church) since 2007. He was one of the original area authorities called in 1995.

Tenorio was born in Tilapan, Veracruz, Mexico. When he was fifteen years old, he and his parents joined the LDS Church while they were living in Río Bravo, Tamaulipas. Tenorio was baptized in the Río Bravo river. A few years later, Tenorio became a branch president in the church. Then he moved to Mexico City with his job with Reader's Digest Mexico.

Initially, Tenorio worked in the publishing industry. He later worked as the manager of the LDS Church's Genealogical Service Center in Mexico. This was the first international Genealogical Service Center the church set up, with Tenorio as its first supervisor. Tenorio supervised the Genealogical Service Center until 1984 when he became the first recorder of the Mexico City Temple.

He later served in various positions related to running welfare and other church programs at the area level. In 1999, as Welfare Services Area manager he was involved in distributing food to flood victims. He later returned to serving as recorder in the Mexico City Temple. He was serving in this position at the time of his call as a general authority. Due to his connection to Tilapan, Tenorio was later, while serving in the church as a regional representative, involved with David A. Palmer and Robert E. Fisher in a project organized by John L. Sorenson to investigate the potential boundaries of the Book of Mormon land of Bountiful in this general region of Mexico.

== LDS Church service ==
Tenorio has served in the LDS Church as a branch president, stake clerk, stake mission president, counselor in a stake presidency, stake president and twice as a regional representative (one time beginning in 1993). He was a sealer in the Mexico City Temple when it opened. He also served as president of the Mexico Tuxtla Gutiérrez Mission from 1990 to 1993.

From 1995 to 2000, Tenorio was an area seventy, serving in the Mexico South Area Presidency for part of that time. While in the later position he was a key figure at the groundbreaking for the Veracruz Mexico Temple. In April 2007, Tenorio became a member of the First Quorum of the Seventy and served as a counselor in the Mexico Area Presidency from 2007 to 2012.

On 6 October 2012, Tenorio was released from the First Quorum of the Seventy and designated an emeritus general authority at the LDS Church's semi-annual general conference.

From 2014 to 2017, Tenorio was the director of the Missionary Training Center (MTC) in Mexico City. This is the church's second largest MTC (after the one in Provo, Utah).

== Personal life ==
In Mexico City, Tenorio met Rosa Elva Valenzuela González, a native of Nuevo Casas Grandes, who was largely raised in the Mormon colonies in Mexico. They were married in December 1973 in Colonia Dublán and were sealed in the Mesa Arizona Temple in January 1974. They are the parents of five children. His youngest brother, Miguel A. Tenorio, served as a mission president in the Bolivia Cochabamba Mission.

== See also ==
- List of general authorities of The Church of Jesus Christ of Latter-day Saints
