= William Barratt =

English LDS church missionary (1823–1889)

William James Barratt (25 January 1823 – 10 September 1889) was an English convert to Mormonism and became the first Latter Day Saint to live in Australia when he was sent there as a missionary of the Church of Jesus Christ of Latter Day Saints. However, he ultimately apostatized from Mormonism.

Barratt was born in Burslem, north Staffordshire, England. The date of Barratt's conversion to Mormonism is unknown, but Latter Day Saint missionaries first preached in the Burslem area in 1839. He was the only member of his family to join the Church of Jesus Christ of Latter Day Saints. On 11 July 1840, apostle George A. Smith recorded in his diary that he had ordained the 17-year-old Barratt to the office of elder and had set him apart to preach as a missionary in Australia. Barratt's parents had already decided to emigrate to Australia and Barratt had decided that he would accompany them and eventually join the main gathering of Latter-day Saints in Utah Territory. On 17 July, Barratt's ship left London for Australia.

The Barratts arrived in Adelaide on 16 November 1840. Barratt found employment as a shepherd's cook in Mount Barker. Barratt tried preaching in Australia, and was successful in baptizing a few people, but quickly became discouraged at the moral tone of the settlers there. One of the people he did baptize in 1842 was Robert Beauchamp. Shortly thereafter, Barratt lost interest in Mormonism and became involved in the Congregational church in Encounter Bay. Because of this, Beauchamp, not Barratt, became the leader of the Church of Jesus Christ of Latter-day Saints (LDS Church) in Australia and eventually the president of the church's Australasian Mission. Although missionaries from the LDS Church arrived in Australia in 1851, there is no record of Barratt attempting to contact them or vice versa.

Barratt became a prominent land owner in the Bald Hills and Inman Valley areas of South Australia. He married Ann Gibson and fathered seven children. Barratt died at Bald Hills, South Australia and is buried at Victor Harbor, South Australia.
