= Perth Australia Temple =

Temple of Church of Jesus Christ of Latter-day Saints in Perth, Western Australia

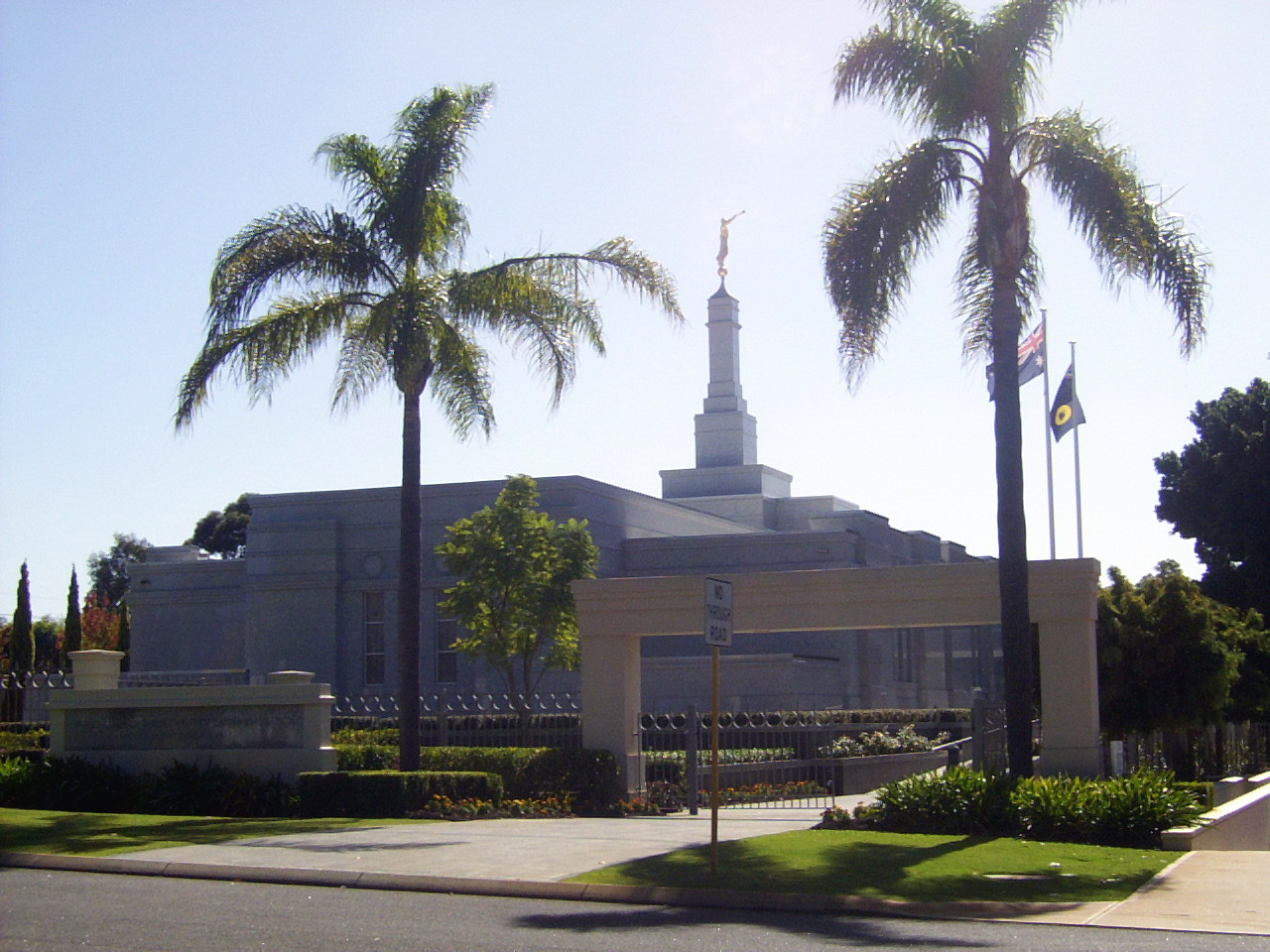
- Interactive map of Perth Australia Temple
- Number: 106
- Dedication: 20 May 2001, by Gordon B. Hinckley
- Site: 2.76 acres (1.12 ha)
- Floor area: 10,700 ft^{2} (990 m^{2})
- Height: 71 ft (22 m)
- Official website • News & images

Church chronology
← Guadalajara Mexico Temple	Perth Australia Temple	→ Columbia River Washington Temple

Additional information
- Announced: 11 June 1999, by Gordon B. Hinckley
- Groundbreaking: 20 November 1999, by Kenneth Johnson
- Open house: 28 April – 12 May 2001
- Current president: Darryl Ferris
- Designed by: Christou Cassella & JEC
- Location: Yokine, Western Australia, Australia
- Coordinates: 31°54′24.85799″S 115°52′11.40239″E
- Exterior finish: Italian Olympia white granite
- Design: Classic modern, single-spire design
- Baptistries: 1
- Ordinance rooms: 2 (two-stage progressive)
- Sealing rooms: 2

The Perth Australia Temple is the 106th operating temple of the Church of Jesus Christ of Latter-day Saints (LDS Church).

It is located at 163–173 Wordsworth Avenue, Yokine, Western Australia, which is a suburb of Perth, Western Australia. The temple serves approximately 12,000 members in the area.

The intent to build the temple was announced on 11 June 1999, by the First Presidency and is the fourth in Australia.

The temple has a single attached spire with a statue of the angel Moroni. The temple was designed by Christou Cassella & JEC, using a classic modern architectural style. A groundbreaking ceremony, to signify the beginning of construction, was held on 20 November 1999, conducted by Kenneth Johnson, a church general authority.

== History ==
The temple was announced by the First Presidency on 11 June 1999. The groundbreaking ceremony took place on 20 November 1999, marking the commencement of construction. The ceremony was presided over by Kenneth Johnson and attended by local church members and community leaders.

Previously members had to travel a distance equivalent to going from Los Angeles to New York City in order to attend the nearest temple in Sydney. Local reaction to the temple was favorable. LDS Church leaders received letters from both the Governor and the Premier of Western Australia expressing their confidence that the temple would be a positive influence on the community.

After construction was completed, approximately 37,000 visitors toured the temple during a public open house held from 28 April to 12 May 2001. LDS Church president Gordon B. Hinckley dedicated the temple on 20 May 2001.

In 2020, like all the church's others, the Perth Australia Temple was closed for a time in response to the COVID-19 pandemic.

== Design and architecture ==
The temple is on a 1.12-hectare (2.76-acre) plot, which it shares with a stake centre. The building has a classic modern architectural style and uses traditional Latter-day Saint temple design. Designed by Christou Cassella & JEC, the temple's architecture reflects both the cultural heritage of Perth and its spiritual significance to the church.

The structure is 23 metres (77 ft) tall, and is constructed with olympia white granite. The exterior has tall glass windows on the sides, as well as "a contemporary design with a circle motif carved in the granite above the windows and along the bottom tier of the spire."

The temple has a baptistry, two instruction rooms, and two sealing rooms, each designed for ceremonial use.

The design has elements representing Latter-day Saint symbolism, to provide deeper spiritual meaning to its appearance and function. Symbolism is important to church members and include the statue of the angel Moroni on top of the spire, which represents "the restoration of the gospel of Jesus Christ."

== Admittance ==
On 17 March 2001, the church announced the public open house that was held from 28 April to 12 May 2001 (excluding Sundays). The temple was dedicated by Gordon B. Hinckley on 20 May 2001, in four sessions.

Like all the church's temples, it is not used for Sunday worship services. To members of the church, temples are regarded as sacred houses of the Lord. Once dedicated, only church members with a current temple recommend can enter for worship.

== See also ==
- Comparison of temples of The Church of Jesus Christ of Latter-day Saints
- List of temples of The Church of Jesus Christ of Latter-day Saints
- List of temples of The Church of Jesus Christ of Latter-day Saints by geographic region
- Temple architecture (Latter-day Saints)
- The Church of Jesus Christ of Latter-day Saints in Australia
