= Sydney Australia Temple =

Temple of the Church of Jesus Christ of Latter-day Saints in Sydney, Australia

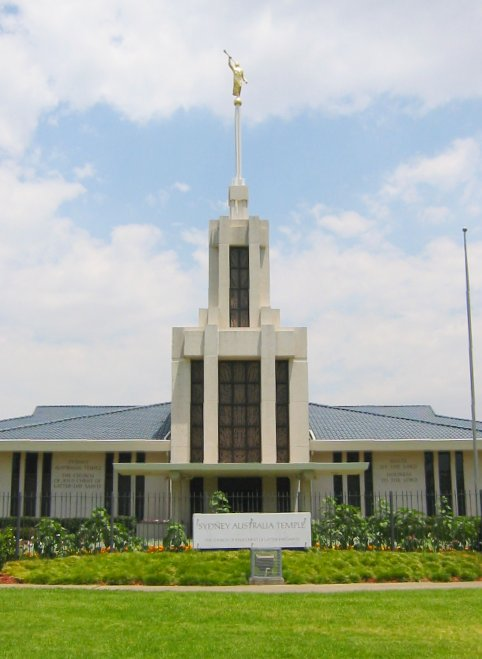
- Interactive map of Sydney Australia Temple
- Number: 28
- Dedication: 20 September 1984, by Gordon B. Hinckley
- Site: 3 acres (1.2 ha)
- Floor area: 30,677 ft^{2} (2,850.0 m^{2})
- Official website • News & images

Church chronology
| ← Boise Idaho Temple | Sydney Australia Temple | → Manila Philippines Temple |

Additional information
- Announced: 2 April 1980, by Spencer W. Kimball
- Groundbreaking: 13 August 1982, by Bruce R. McConkie
- Open house: 6–18 September 1984
- Current president: Joseph Saikaly
- Designed by: Emil B. Fetzer and R. Lindsay Little
- Location: Carlingford, New South Wales, Australia
- Coordinates: 33°46′32.22119″S 151°3′2.131199″E
- Exterior finish: Precast panels; white quartz finish; terra cotta roof tiles
- Design: Modern, single-spire design
- Baptistries: 1
- Ordinance rooms: 2 (stationary)
- Sealing rooms: 3
- Clothing rental: Yes

The Sydney Australia Temple is a temple of the Church of Jesus Christ of Latter-day Saints located in Carlingford, a suburb of Sydney, New South Wales. Announced on 2 April 1980, by church president Spencer W. Kimball, it became the church's first temple in Australia and the 28th operating worldwide. The temple has a single-spire design and blue-glazed terra cotta roof tiles, and was the last temple constructed using that architectural style. A groundbreaking ceremony was held on 13 August 1982, presided over by Bruce R. McConkie of the Quorum of the Twelve Apostles.

Following its completion, the temple opened for public tours in September 1984, attracting thousands of visitors before its dedication by Gordon B. Hinckley on 20 September. In 1991, the building underwent a significant expansion that added a new baptistry and increased its total square footage. The temple includes two ordinance rooms and three sealing rooms.

== History ==
The Sydney Australia Temple was announced by church president Spencer W. Kimball on 2 April 1980, during a news conference held with his counselors, N. Eldon Tanner and Marion G. Romney. On 13 August 1982, the church announced that the temple would be constructed on a 3-acre (1.2 ha) property located at 756 Pennant Hills Road in Carlingford, a suburb northwest of Sydney. The site was previously used as a school for boys, and existing buildings were renovated for church use, including area offices. Preliminary plans called for a structure of about 30,000 square feet. It was the church's 28th dedicated and operating temple and the first in Australia.

The groundbreaking ceremony took place on 13 August 1982, marking the commencement of construction, with Bruce R. McConkie of the Quorum of the Twelve Apostles presiding. He had previously served as a mission president in Australia. The event was attended by local church members and community leaders.

Local government restrictions prevented installation of the angel Moroni statue on top of the spire at the time of the dedication. The temple was dedicated without the statue due to the restriction, but after a year, the statue was added. After a year, the ruling was overturned, and the statue was installed on 3 September 1985.

Following completion, a public open house was held from 6 September to 18 September 1984. During the open house, thousands of people toured the temple, and church officials received hundreds of requests for more information about the faith. The temple was dedicated on 20 September 1984, by Gordon B. Hinckley, then second counselor in the church's First Presidency. The dedication spanned four days, from 20 September to 23 September, with 14 dedicatory sessions and 7,689 members attended.

In 1991, an addition to the temple was dedicated by Russell M. Nelson, of the Quorum of the Twelve Apostles, but it was not considered by the church to be a full rededication.

In 2014, church members in Australia commemorated the 30th anniversary of the temple's opening. A video marking the occasion was released, featuring personal reflections on how the temple had blessed the lives of local members and their families.

In 2020, like all the church's others, the Sydney Australia Temple was closed for a time in response to the COVID-19 pandemic.

== Design and architecture ==
The Sydney Australia Temple has a modern, single-spire design, using a modern style by church architect Emil B. Fetzer, and R. Lindsay Little.

The temple is on a 3-acre (1.2 ha) plot in Carlingford, a residential suburb northwest of Sydney. Prior to its selection for the temple, the site was home to a school for boys; the church later repurposed some of the existing facilities for administrative functions. The grounds include gardens and mature eucalyptus trees.

It is a single-story building constructed using precast concrete panels with white quartz, along with terracotta roof tiles. A single spire rises from the building’s front façade, with a statue of the angel Moroni, added a year after the dedication due to local government delays, on its top.

The temple's interior is 30,067 square feet (2,793.3 m^{2}) and includes two ordinance rooms, three sealing rooms, and a baptistry.

== Temple presidents ==
The church's temples are directed by a temple president and matron, each typically serving for a term of three years. The president and matron oversee the administration of temple operations and provide guidance and training for both temple patrons and staff.

Serving from 1984 to 1987, Milton J. Hess was the first president, alongside matron Julia Fern Gregory Hess. As of 2024, the Joseph Saikaly is the president, with Denise Saikaly serving as matron.

== Admittance ==
After construction was completed, a public open house was held from 6 September to 18 September 1984 (excluding Sundays). The temple was dedicated by Gordon B. Hinckley on 20 September 1984, with 14 sessions held over four days. Like all the church's temples, it is not used for Sunday worship services. To members of the church, temples are regarded as sacred houses of the Lord. Once dedicated, only church members with a current temple recommend can enter for worship.

== See also ==
- Comparison of temples of The Church of Jesus Christ of Latter-day Saints
- List of temples of The Church of Jesus Christ of Latter-day Saints
- List of temples of The Church of Jesus Christ of Latter-day Saints by geographic region
- Temple architecture (Latter-day Saints)
- The Church of Jesus Christ of Latter-day Saints in Australia
