= Colonia Juárez Chihuahua Mexico Temple =

Temple of The Church of Jesus Christ of Latter-day Saints

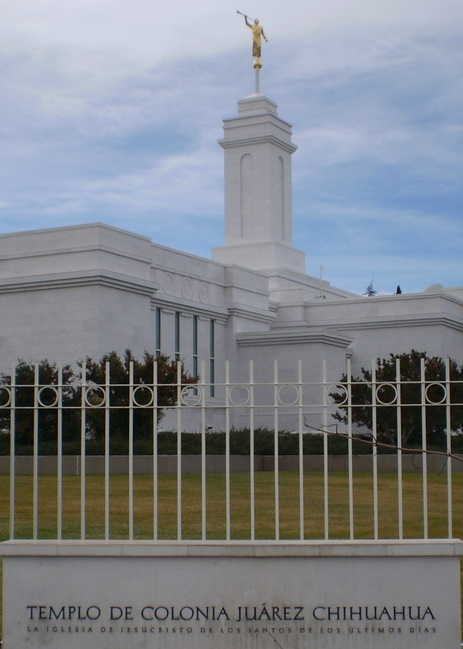
- Interactive map of Colonia Juárez Chihuahua Mexico Temple
- Number: 55
- Dedication: 6 March 1999, by Gordon B. Hinckley
- Site: 2.56 acres (1.04 ha)
- Floor area: 6,800 ft^{2} (630 m^{2})
- Height: 71 ft (22 m)
- Official website • News & images

Church chronology
← Anchorage Alaska Temple	Colonia Juárez Chihuahua Mexico Temple	→ Madrid Spain Temple

Additional information
- Announced: 4 October 1997, by Gordon B. Hinckley
- Groundbreaking: 7 March 1998, by Eran A. Call
- Open house: 25–27 February 1999
- Current president: Walter Johnson
- Designed by: Alvaro Inigo and Church A&E Services
- Location: Colonia Juárez, Chihuahua, Mexico
- Coordinates: 30°18′19.77479″N 108°4′56.46360″W
- Exterior finish: Gleaming white marble
- Design: Classic modern, single-spire design
- Baptistries: 1
- Ordinance rooms: 1 (stationary)
- Sealing rooms: 1

The Colonia Juárez Chihuahua Mexico Temple is a temple of the Church of Jesus Christ of Latter-day Saints in Colonia Juárez, Chihuahua, Mexico. Announced on October 4, 1997, by church president Gordon B. Hinckley, it became the second operating temple in Mexico and the first in the state of Chihuahua. Built on a hillside overlooking Juárez Academy, it is one of the church's small‑temple designs and is a single‑story structure clad in white marble, with a central spire that has a statue of the angel Moroni on top.

A groundbreaking ceremony was held on March 7, 1998, with Eran A. Call, a church general authority presiding. Construction used both professional contractors and local volunteers from both the United States and Mexico. After construction was completed, a public open house was held from February 25 to 27, 1999. The temple was dedicated in by Hinckley in four sessions on March 6–7, 1999, with approximately 4,930 people attending. The temple has one ordinance room, one sealing room, and a baptistry.

== History ==
The temple was announced by church president Gordon B. Hinckley on October 4, 1997, during general conference. The temple was constructed on an approximately 1-acre property in Colonia Juárez, Chihuahua, on a hill overlooking Juárez Academy in northern Mexico. Preliminary plans were for a single‑story structure of more than 6,800 square feet (≈ 632 m^{2}), with an exterior finish of white marble and a single spire with a statue of the angel Moroni.

A groundbreaking ceremony was held on March 7, 1998, marking the commencement of construction. This ceremony was presided over by Eran A. Call, a general authority and president of the church's Mexico North Area, and was attended by about 800 local church members and leaders.

Following completion of construction, the church announced the public open house that was held from February 25 to 27, 1999. During the open house, approximately 10,870 visitors—including about 150 religious, civic, and business leaders—toured the building. The temple was dedicated on March 6–7, 1999, by church president Gordon B. Hinckley. Dedication sessions were held in four sessions, with 4,932 Latter‑day Saints church members attending.

At the time of dedication, Colonia Juárez had a population of around 1,000 people. On March 7, because the region was experiencing drought conditions, Hinckley included a petition for rain in his dedicatory prayer, and before the last bus of the dedication party left, rain began to fall.

=== Historical and cultural context ===
The temple serves a region with deep Latter‑day Saint roots, dating back to the colonization of pioneer members of the church settling in northern Mexico in 1875, fleeing from persecution. Colonia Juárez was founded in 1885 by colonists from Utah and Arizona as one of several settlements in Chihuahua. These colonies flourished despite early challenges like drought and revolution, with the Juárez Stake established in 1895—Mexico's first stake and the second organized outside the United States. By the late 20th century, Colonia Juárez, and nearby Dublán, remained the only two surviving colonies and continued as vibrant Latter‑day Saint communities, which inspired the construction of the temple.

The temple was the second operating temple in Mexico (following Mexico City) and the first in Chihuahua. It was also the first of the smaller temples (initiated by Hinckley and designed to serve areas with smaller Latter‑day Saint populations more quickly and cost‑effectively) completed outside the United States.

== Design and architecture ==
The Colonia Juárez Chihuahua Mexico Temple uses the “small-temple” concept introduced by Hinckley in 1997, following his personal sketch of a floor plan designed to accommodate essential ordinance rooms in minimal space. Managed by the church's Temple Construction Department under Keith Stepan, the department reorganized into specialized teams to handle the surge of small-temple projects, with the “white team” assigned to Colonia Juárez. Architects Vern L. Martindale and Michael Enfield (later replaced by Boyd Erickson) led the design process, which went through multiple iterations before being finalized. The temple is a single-story building featuring a central spire and clad in white marble quarried from Durango, Mexico, though significant effort was required to replace substandard marble and ensure quality installation.

The temple is on a 4,000 m^{2} (1-acre) hillside site overlooking Juárez Academy in Colonia Juárez. The land was donated by the Romney family, long‑time residents of the settlement Landscaping includes lawn areas, flowerbeds, and trees, with much of the final grounds work—including sprinkler installation and planting—completed by volunteers from the local stakes, donating tens of thousands of hours. The time for these hours were given by many men who were out of work, but reportedly did not suffer economically.

The exterior work, including marble installation, required extensive weather‑resistant construction on the exposed hillside on scaffolding, with workers and volunteers assisting in the finishing stages, unloaded from flatbed trailers from over the United States border.

The temple has one ordinance room, one sealing room, and a baptistry. The interior design has a Spanish‑colonial influence, with custom‑made stained glass, custom made handcrafted furniture, and a chandelier in the celestial room. The church's Temple Construction Department coordinated these features with on‑site oversight by architect Vern L. Martindale and interior design lead Greg Hill.

The baptismal font is supported by twelve oxen, representing the twelve tribes of Israel as described in Latter‑day Saint temple tradition and biblical symbolism.

== Temple presidents and admittance ==
=== Temple presidents ===
The church's temples are directed by a temple president and matron, each typically serving for a term of three years. The president and matron oversee the administration of temple operations and provide guidance and training for both temple patrons and staff.

Serving from 1999 to 2004, Meredith I. Romney (a cousin to Mitt Romney) was the first president, with Karen S. Romney serving as matron. Romney was kidnapped in 2009 and was released for ransom. The Deseret News reported that there was no indication his status as a church member or as president of the temple played a part in his kidnapping.

As of 2024, Walter L. Johnson is the president with Janette F. Johnson serving as matron.

=== Admittance ===
A public open house was held from February 25–27, 1999. The temple was dedicated by church president Gordon B. Hinckley on March 6–7, 1999, in four sessions. Like all the church's temples, it is not used for Sunday worship services. To members of the church, temples are regarded as sacred houses of the Lord. Once dedicated, only church members with a current temple recommend can enter for worship.

== See also ==
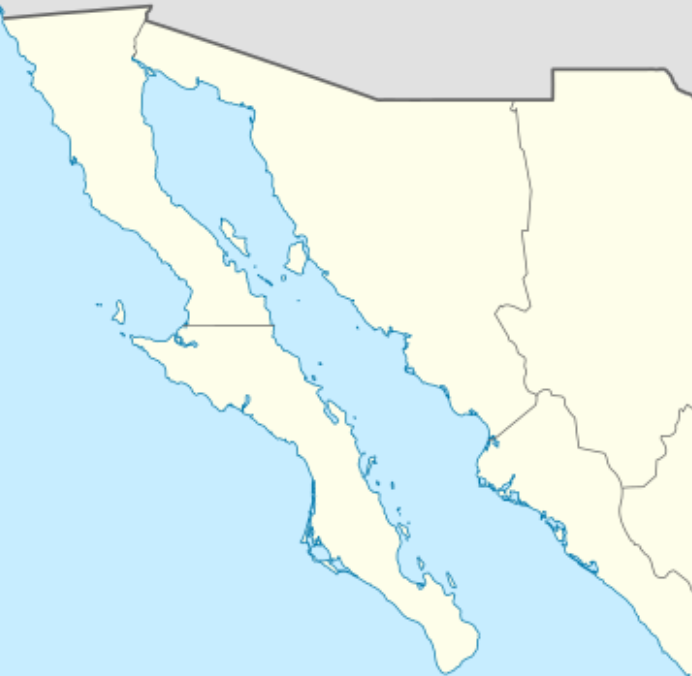

Temples in Northwestern Mexico

Northeast Mexico temples
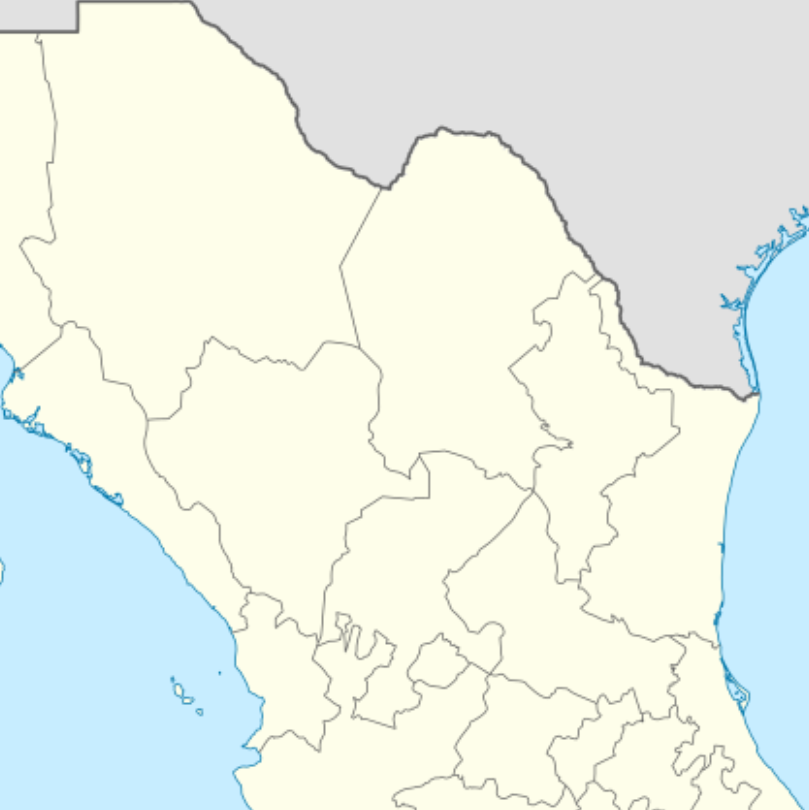
Temples in Northeastern Mexico
Central Mexico temples
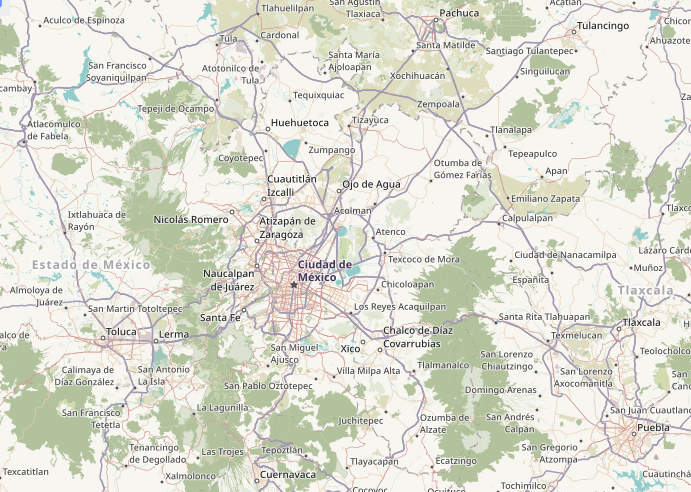
Temples in Central Mexico
Southeast Mexico temples
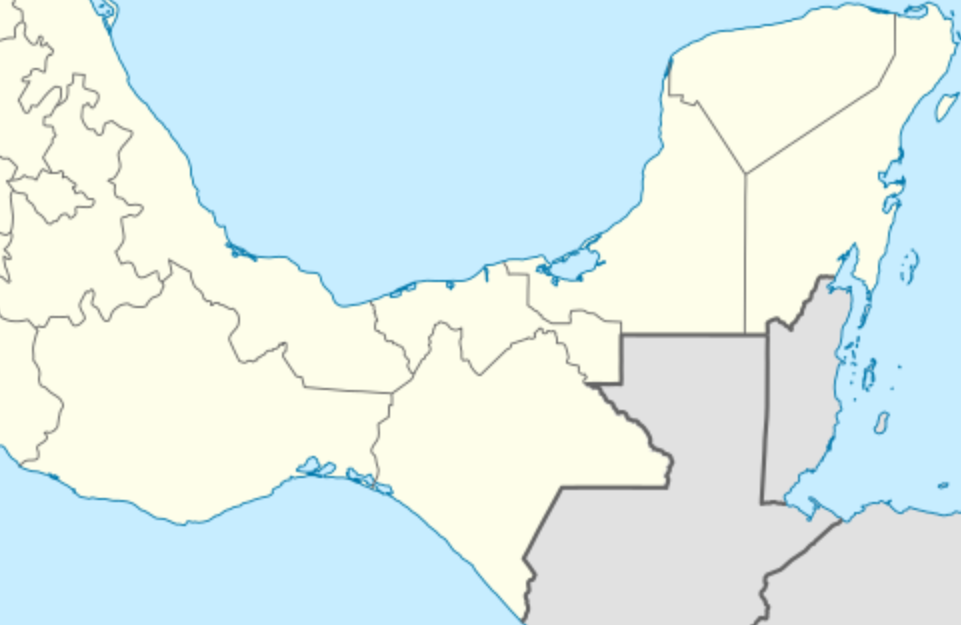
Temples in Southeast Mexico
Mexico map
Temples in Mexico

= Operating
= Under construction
= Announced
= Temporarily closed

- Comparison of temples of The Church of Jesus Christ of Latter-day Saints
- List of temples of The Church of Jesus Christ of Latter-day Saints
- List of temples of The Church of Jesus Christ of Latter-day Saints by geographic region
- Temple architecture (Latter-day Saints)
- The Church of Jesus Christ of Latter-day Saints in Mexico
