= Anchorage Alaska Temple =

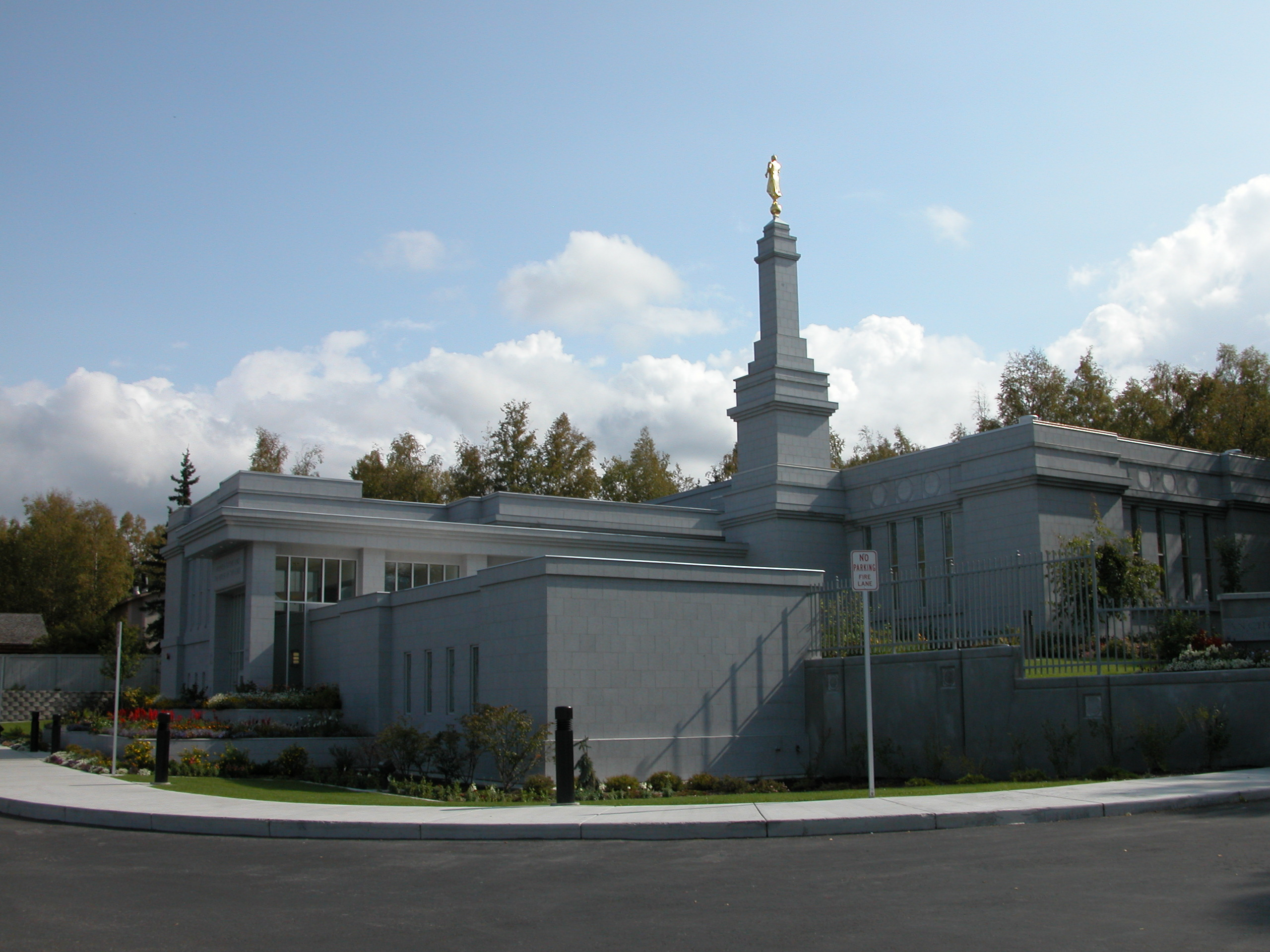
- Interactive map of Anchorage Alaska Temple
- Number: 54
- Dedication: January 9, 1999, by Gordon B. Hinckley
- Site: 5.4 acres (2.2 ha)
- Floor area: 11,937 ft^{2} (1,109.0 m^{2})
- Height: 71 ft (22 m)
- Official website • News & images

Church chronology
← Monticello Utah Temple	Anchorage Alaska Temple	→ Colonia Juárez Chihuahua Mexico Temple

Additional information
- Announced: October 4, 1997, by Gordon B. Hinckley
- Groundbreaking: April 17, 1998, by F. Melvin Hammond
- Open house: December 29–31, 1998; January 27–31, 2004
- Rededicated: February 8, 2004, by Gordon B. Hinckley
- Current president: Rodney D. Metcalf
- Designed by: McCool Carlson Green
- Location: Anchorage, Alaska, United States
- Coordinates: 61°6′5.857200″N 149°50′25.84319″W
- Exterior finish: Stone-clad Sierra white granite quarried from near Fresno, California
- Baptistries: 1
- Ordinance rooms: 2 (two-stage progressive)
- Sealing rooms: 1

The Anchorage Alaska Temple is the 54th operating temple of the Church of Jesus Christ of Latter-day Saints (LDS Church) and the first in Alaska. Dedicated on January 9, 1999, by church president Gordon B. Hinckley, it was among the earliest constructed under the church's initiative to build smaller temples, following the Monticello Utah Temple. Located in Anchorage, it serves church members in Alaska and the Yukon Territory.

Architecturally, the temple has a single spire with a gold-leafed statue of the angel Moroni on its top. The design uses Alaskan motifs, including representations of fir trees on doorway pilasters and stained glass reminiscent of water. The west side displays the Big Dipper pointing to the North Star, like the Alaskan state flag. Its exterior is Sierra white granite, and its interior includes two ordinance rooms, one sealing room, and a baptistry, and a total floor area of 11,937 square feet.

In April 2003, the temple underwent significant renovations, adding a second ordinance room, offices, dressing rooms, a waiting area, laundry facilities, and an elevator. The temple was rededicated by Hinckley on February 8, 2004. In January 2023, plans were announced to reconstruct the temple on an adjacent site, increasing its size to approximately 30,000 square feet. The existing temple remains operational during construction, with the new facility expected to be completed by 2026.

== History ==
In 1997, church president Gordon B. Hinckley announced that the church would begin building smaller temples, with the first in Monticello, Utah, and the second in Anchorage, Alaska. The church announced that the temple would be constructed on an approximately 3.4-acre (1.4 ha) property located at 13111 Brayton Drive in Anchorage. The preliminary plans called for a one-story structure of more than 6,800 square feet.

A groundbreaking ceremony took place on April 17, 1998, marking the commencement of construction. This ceremony was presided over by F. Melvin Hammond, a church general authority, and attended by local church members and community leaders. During construction, challenges included the Subzero Alaskan weather conditions, but the construction was completed in approximately nine months.

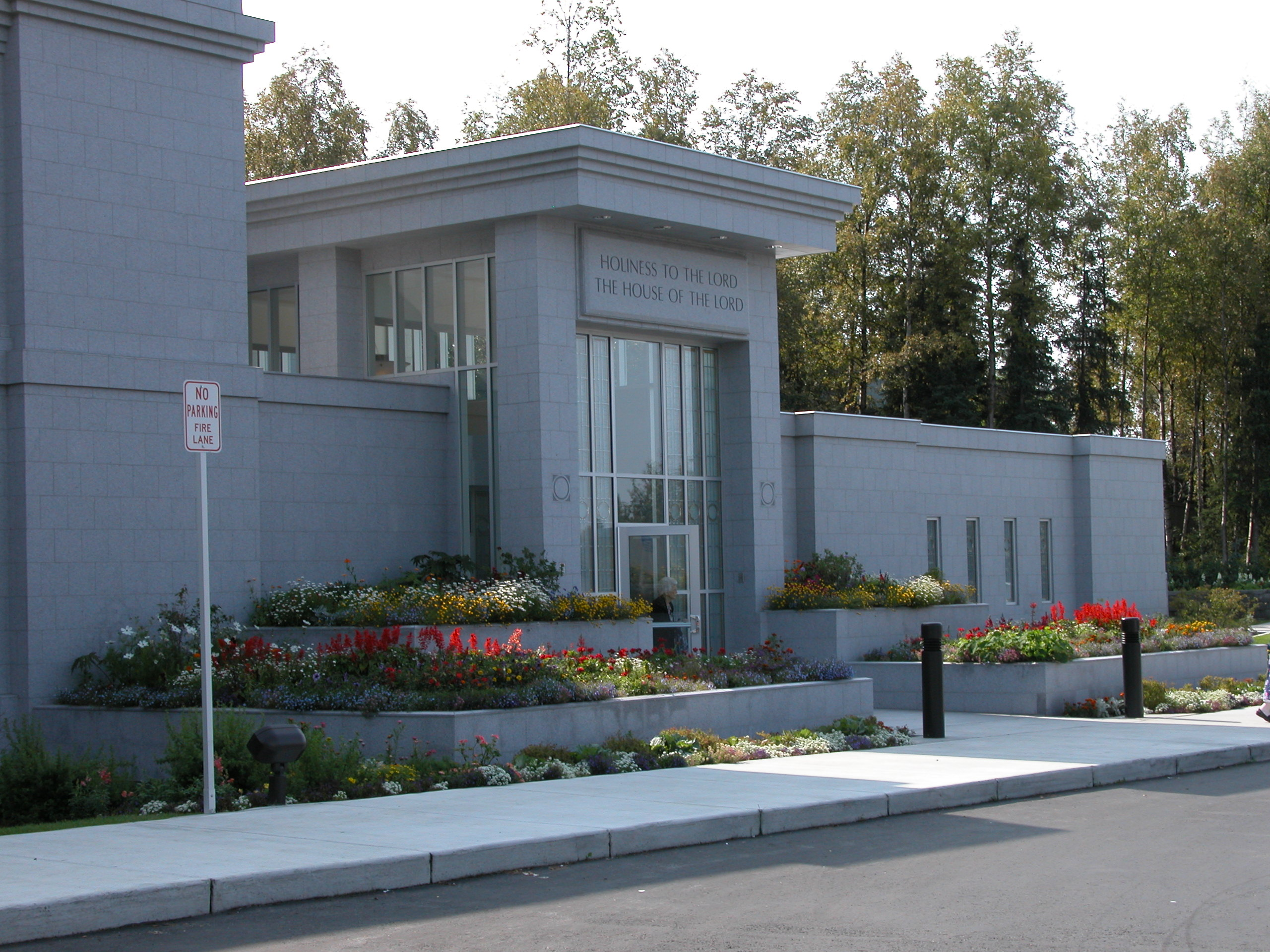
The entrance of the Anchorage Alaska Temple

The west side of the temple features the seven stars of the Big Dipper pointing to the North Star, a symbol found on the Alaskan state flag and also the Salt Lake Temple. The temple walls are covered with Sierra white granite from near Fresno, California. The design uses Alaskan motifs, such as likenesses of fir trees on the doorway pilasters. The stained glass is reminiscent of water, and evergreens and earth stones provide decorative elements on doorway posts.

Following completion of construction, a public open house was held from December 26, 1998, to January 2, 1999, with approximately 4,300 people visiting the temple.Gordon B. Hinckley dedicated the temple on January 9, 1999, with more than six thousand members from as far away as the Yukon in attendance, despite the freezing weather. A remodel that culminated with a rededication on February 8, 2004, which increased the size from 6,800 square feet to 11,937 square feet (1,109.0 m²), and a total of two ordinance rooms and one sealing room.

In 2020, like all the church's others, the Anchorage Alaska Temple was closed for a time in response to the COVID-19 pandemic.

In January 2023, the church announced plans to relocate the Anchorage Alaska Temple to an adjacent spot currently occupied by a meetinghouse at 13111 Brayton Drive. The new building will be approximately 30,000 square feet, an increase from its current 11,937 square feet, four times the original size, and 150% of the 2nd version's size. Construction on the new building began in early 2024 and is anticipated to be completed by 2026. The existing temple remains open while the new one is constructed. Following dedication of the temple in its new location, the existing structure will be decommissioned and removed, and a meetinghouse will then be built on the land.

== Design and architecture ==
The Anchorage Alaska Temple is on a 5.4-acre (2.2 ha) plot, adjacent to a meetinghouse. The landscaping includes native Alaskan flora and is designed to complement the natural surroundings.

The temple is a single-story structure constructed with Sierra white granite quarried near Fresno, California. It features a single spire topped with a gold-colored 6-foot statue of the angel Moroni, and a total height of 55 feet. The west side of the temple displays the seven stars of the Big Dipper pointing to the North Star, a symbol also represented on the Salt Lake City Temple.

The interior has a baptistry, two ordinance rooms, and a sealing room. Its celestial room has a 700-pound chandelier with thousands of Hungarian crystals and 140 lights, which give off a gold-colored ray of light through the windows. The interior furnishings continue the Alaskan motifs, with water-inspired stained glass and stylized evergreen patterns. The state flower, the Forget Me Not, is also included.

Symbolism is important to church members and includes the seven stars of the Big Dipper pointing to the North Star, representing guidance and direction, which is also found on the Salt Lake Temple.

=== Renovations and reconstruction ===
A significant renovation began in April 2003, and included the addition of a second ordinance room, offices, new dressing rooms, a waiting room, laundry facilities, and an elevator. The renovated temple was rededicated on February 8, 2004, by church president Gordon B. Hinckley.

On January 23, 2023, the church announced it would replace an existing meetinghouse with the enlarged temple, along with releasing a rendering of the new structure. It is expected to be completed by the summer of 2026, and during construction, the existing temple remains functional and open. This will increase the square footage of the temple 150%, while being four times the original size. The meetinghouse and the temple will effectively swap spots on the site when completed.

== Temple presidents ==
The church's temples are directed by a temple president and matron, each typically serving for a term of three years. The president and matron oversee the administration of temple operations and provide guidance and training for both temple patrons and staff.

Serving from 1999 to 2004, the temple's first president was Merrill D. Briggs, with Janet J. Briggs serving as matron. As of 2025, Wesley D. Newman is the president, with Linnea K. Newman serving as matron.

== Admittance ==
After construction was completed, a public open house was held from December 29 to 31, 1998 (excluding Sundays). The temple was dedicated by Gordon B. Hinckley on January 9, 1999, in seven sessions. Following extensive renovations, a second open house was held from Jan 27 to Jan 31, 2004.

Like all the church's temples, it is not used for Sunday worship services. To members of the church, temples are regarded as sacred houses of the Lord. Once dedicated, only church members with a current temple recommend can enter for worship.

== See also ==
Temples in Alaska ()
- = Operating
- = Under construction
- = Announced
- = Temporarily Closed

- The Church of Jesus Christ of Latter-day Saints in Alaska
- Comparison of temples of The Church of Jesus Christ of Latter-day Saints
- List of temples of The Church of Jesus Christ of Latter-day Saints
- List of temples of The Church of Jesus Christ of Latter-day Saints by geographic region
- Temple architecture (Latter-day Saints)

== Additional reading ==
- "Open house, dedication set for Alaska temple", Church News, November 14, 1998
- "Alaska temple opens doors to the public", Church News, January 2, 1999
- Howlett, Sandi (January 9, 1999), "Sacred edifice called a 'jewel box': Nearly 15,000 visit open house of Alaska temple", Church News
- Dockstader, Julie A. (January 16, 1999), "Northernmost temple dedicated", Church News
- Howlett, Sandi (February 7, 2004), "Icy opening and a warm welcome", Church News
- Howlett, Sandi (February 14, 2004), "The story of Alaska", Church News
- Howlett, Sandi (February 14, 2004), "Anchorage Alaska Temple rededicated by Prophet", Church News
