= The Church of Jesus Christ of Latter-day Saints in Alaska =

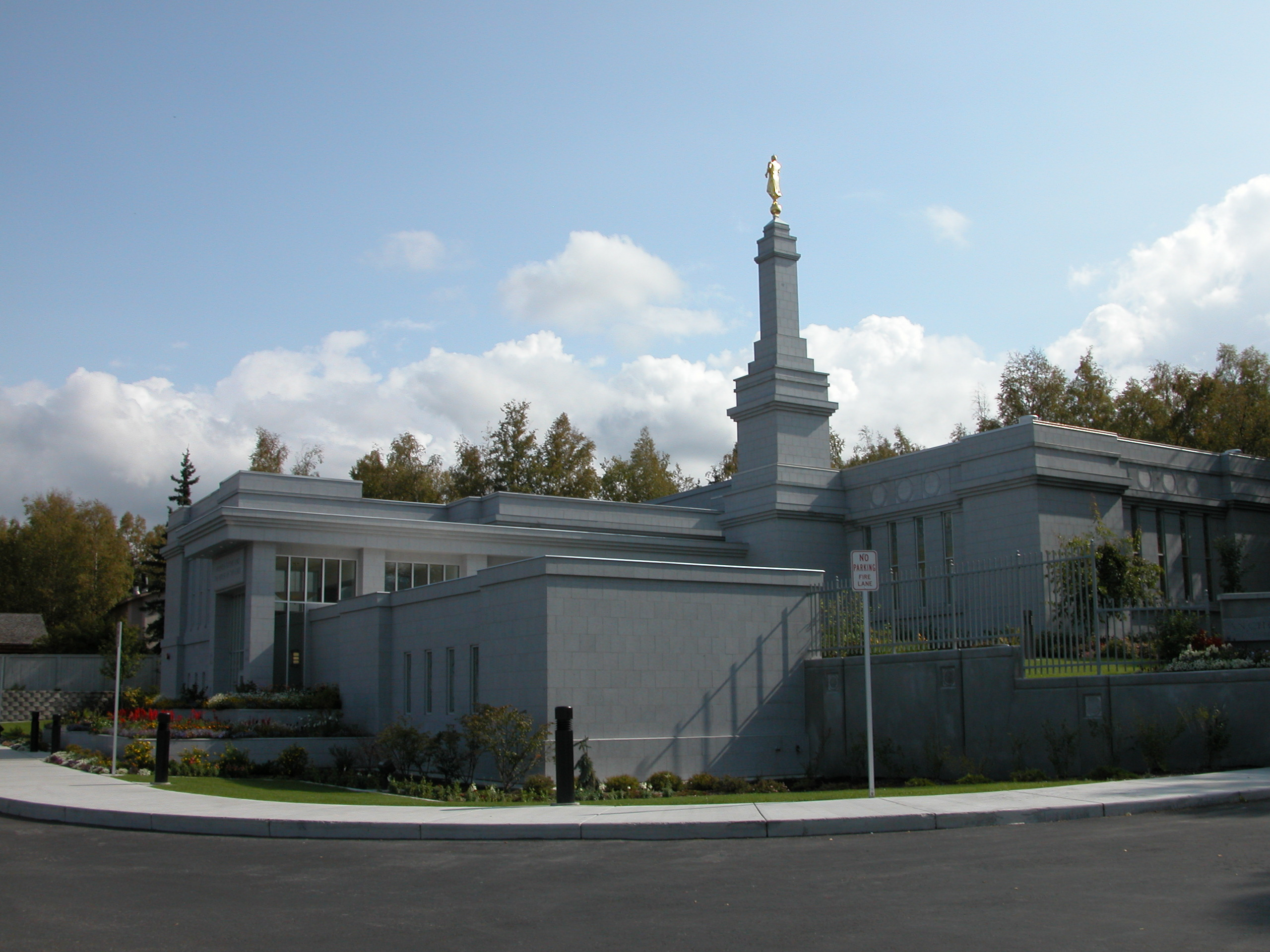
- The Anchorage Alaska Temple
- Area: US West
- Members: 33,574 (2025)
- Stakes: 9
- Wards: 59
- Branches: 23
- Total Congregations: 82
- Missions: 1
- Temples: 1 operating 1 under construction 2 total
- FamilySearch Centers: 15

The Church of Jesus Christ of Latter-day Saints in Alaska refers to the Church of Jesus Christ of Latter-day Saints (LDS Church) and its members in Alaska. The church's first congregation in Alaska was organized in 1938. It has since grown to 33,574 members in 82 congregations.

Official church membership as a percentage of general population was 4.53% in 2014. According to the 2014 Pew Forum on Religion & Public Life survey, 5% of Alaskans self-identify themselves most closely with the LDS Church. The LDS Church is the 2nd largest denomination in Alaska, behind the Roman Catholic Church.

== History ==
Membership in Alaska
Year	Membership
1941	300
1961	3,051
1970	6,744
1980	14,414
1990	21,410
1999	25,340
2009	30,169
2019	33,495
2024	33,987
Source: Windall J. Ashton; Jim M. Wall, Deseret News, various years, Church Almanac State Information: Alaska

The first LDS Church members came to Alaska with the gold rush in 1898. One of these was Edward G. Cannon (1824-1910), a man originally from Kentucky who had served in the Mexican war and converted to the LDS Church after traveling to Utah in 1871. From 1871 to 1881 Cannon lived in Wanship, Utah. He and his son then lived for nearly 20 years in Indiana before migrating to Nome, Alaska. Cannon had worked as a farmer and medical doctor previously. He held various mining claims in the Nome area while there. He sought to establish the LDS Church in Nome. In June 1902, Cannon baptized Kedzie N. Winnie (1874- ) a man born in Walton, New York. Winnie had come to Nome in the 1890s. In September 1902, Cannon ordained Winnie an elder with the authorization of Melvin J. Ballard, who as president of the Northwestern States Mission held ecclesiastical jurisdiction for the church over Alaska. Winnie worked closely with Cannon in preaching the gospel until Cannon's death in 1910. He then carried on his own campaign of preaching the gospel and regularly contributing articles on it to Nome newspapers until he chose to migrate to the body of the church in Utah in 1913.

After Winnie left, the church had no organized presence in Alaska for 15 years. In 1927, William R. Sloan became president of the Northwestern States Mission and shortly after, during a tour of the mission John A. Widstoe, of the Quorum of the Twelve Apostles, recommended to Sloan that missionary work be extended to Alaska. Sloan gave the assignment to open missionary work in Alaska to Alvin Englestead, a 36-year-old widower from Kanab, Utah who was serving in the Northwestern States Mission on his second mission, having previously served in Australia. Englestead recruited his stake president from Kanab, 59-year-old Heber J. Meeks, to lead the effort, and 48-year-old James Judd to also join the effort.

In 1981, special church buildings designed for the Arctic weather were built.

One of the first smaller LDS Church temples was built in Anchorage in 1999. In 2016, the Alaska Bush Branch was formed with approximately 200 members from 36 families, and they meet Sunday mornings over the phone.

In January 2023, the church announced plans to rebuild the Anchorage Alaska Temple. The new building would be approximately 30,000 square feet, an increase from the existing 11,930 square foot temple.

== Borough Statistics ==
List of LDS Church adherents in each county as of 2010 according to the Association of Religion Data Archives:

Borough	Congregations	Adherents	% of Population
Aleutians West	1	106	1.91
Anchorage	28	13,867	4.75
Bethel	1	172	1.01
Denali	1	82	4.49
Dillingham	1	44	0.91
Fairbanks North Star	10	4,525	4.64
Haines	1	81	3.23
Juneau	4	1,711	5.47
Kenai	5	2,929	5.29
Ketchikan	1	731	5.42
Kodiak	1	439	3.23
Matanuska-Susitna	11	5,378	6.04
Nome	1	119	1.25
North Slope	1	111	1.18
Northwest Arctic	1	64	0.85
Sitka	1	344	3.87
Southeast Fairbanks	2	404	5.75
Valdez-Cordova	3	457	4.74
Yakutat	1	57	8.61

== Stakes ==
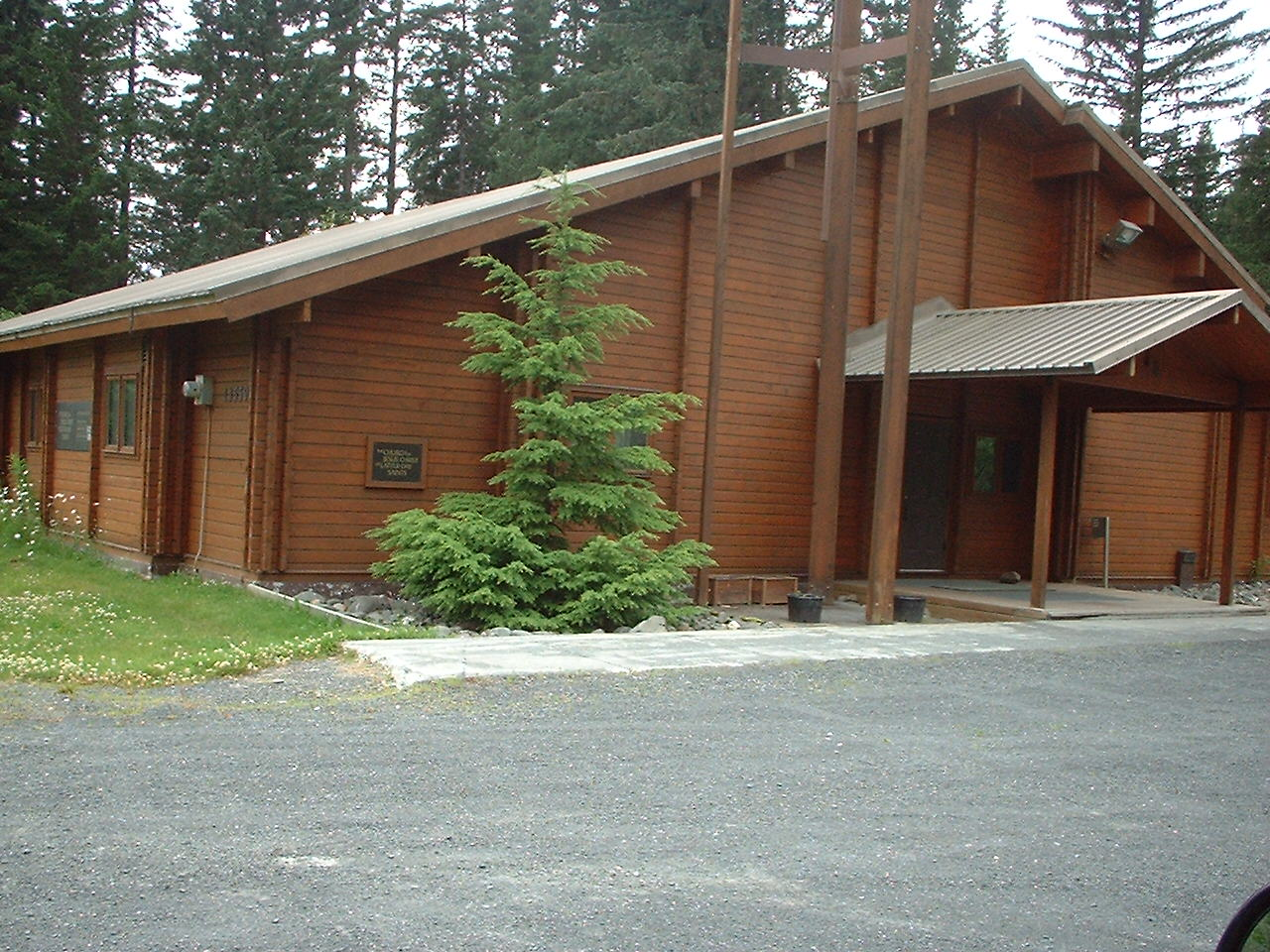
A meetinghouse for The Church of Jesus Christ of Latter-day Saints, located along the Seward Highway, just north of Seward, Alaska.

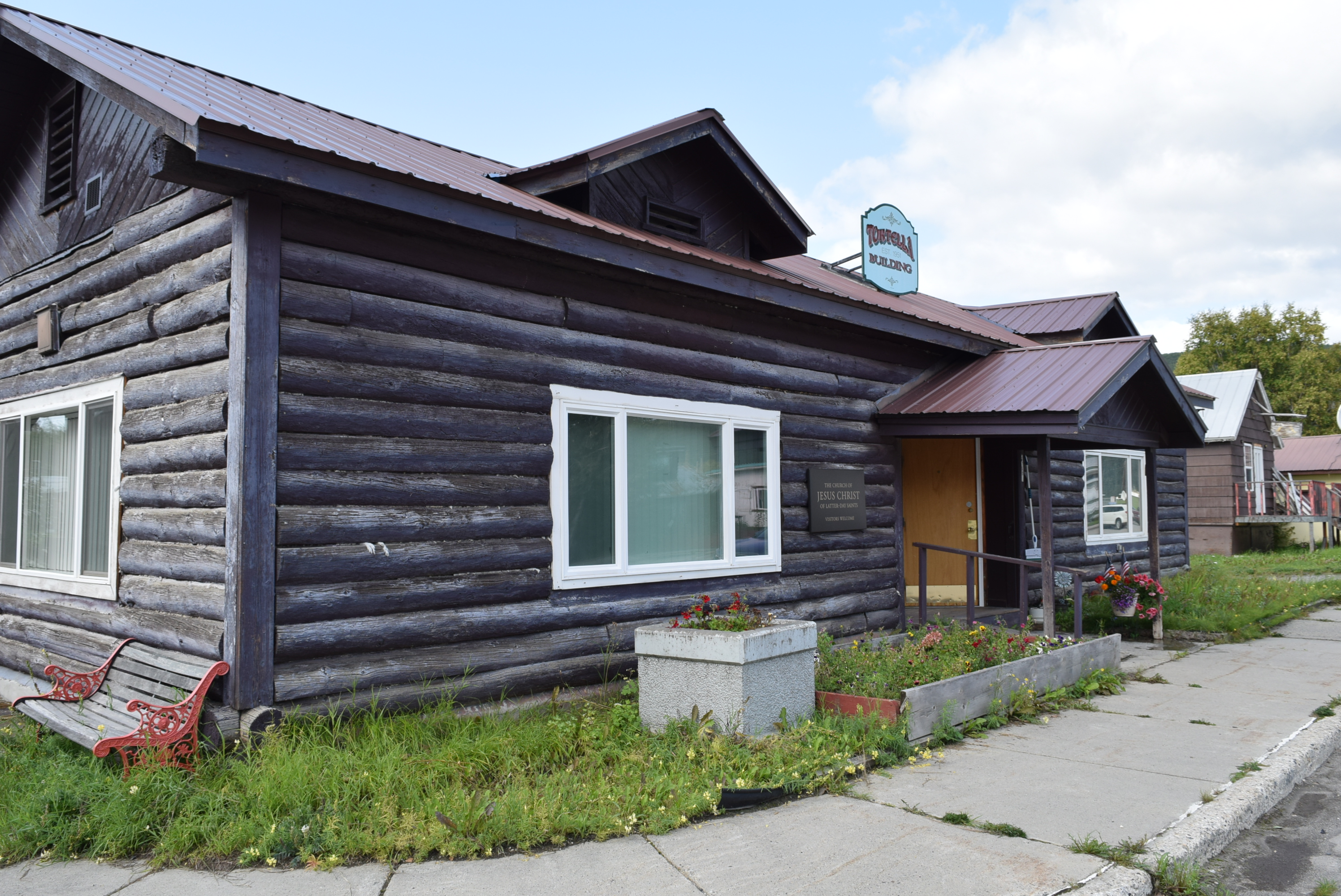
A meetinghouse for The Church of Jesus Christ of Latter-day Saints in Nenana, Alaska

As of May 2025, there were 9 stakes in Alaska. A branch in Whitehorse, Yukon is part of the Juneau Alaska Stake.

Stake	Organized
Anchorage Alaska	August 13, 1961
Anchorage Alaska North	September 17, 1978
Eagle River Alaska	November 24, 2002
Fairbanks Alaska	May 27, 1979
Juneau Alaska	October 8, 1995
North Pole Alaska	March 28, 2021
Palmer Alaska	March 20, 2016
Soldotna Alaska	December 9, 1984
Wasilla Alaska	November 13, 1983

== Missions ==
The first two missionaries arrived in Juneau in 1913 where they worked for a few weeks. The next missionaries, Heber J. Meeks, Alvin Englestead, James Judd, and Lowell T. Plowman arrived in Alaska in 1928, under the direction of William R. Sloan of the Northwestern States Mission. There have continued to be missionaries in Alaska since then.

Alaska has been part of several missions. Alaska was part of the Northwestern States until 1941, when the Western Canadian was organized. In 1960, the Alaska-Canadian Mission was organized. It was renamed the Alaska-British Columbia Mission in 1970. On October 15, 1974, the Alaska Anchorage Mission was organized - being the first mission to be based in the state.

Mission Serving Alaska	Effective Date
Northwestern States	1913
Western Canadian	September 15, 1941
Alaska-Canadian Mission	November 21, 1960
Alaska-British Columbia Mission	June 10, 1970
Alaska Anchorage Mission	October 15, 1974

== Temples ==
Temples in Alaska ()
- = Operating
- = Under construction
- = Announced
- = Temporarily Closed

On January 9, 1999, the Anchorage Alaska Temple was dedicated by church president Gordon B. Hinckley. After remodeling, Hinckley rededicated the temple on February 8, 2004. In January 2023, the church announced plans to rebuild the Anchorage Alaska Temple. The new building will be approximately 30,000 square feet, an increase from the existing 11,930 square foot temple.

54. Anchorage Alaska Temple; Official website; News & images	
Location: Announced: Groundbreaking: Dedicated: Rededicated: Size:	Anchorage, Alaska, United States; October 4, 1997 by Gordon B. Hinckley; April 17, 1998 by F. Melvin Hammond; January 9, 1999 by Gordon B. Hinckley; February 8, 2004 by Gordon B. Hinckley; 11,937 sq ft (1,109.0 m^{2}) on a 5.4-acre (2.2 ha) site - designed by McCool Carlson Green
. Anchorage Alaska Temple (New) (Dedication scheduled)	
Location: Announced: Open House: Dedicated: Size:	Anchorage, Alaska, United States; 23 January 2023 by Russell M. Nelson; 13 May 2027 - 29 May 2027 scheduled for 13 June 2027; 30,000 sq ft (2,800 m^{2}) on a 5.4-acre (2.2 ha) site
270. Fairbanks Alaska Temple (Under construction); Official website; News & images	
Location: Announced: Groundbreaking: Size:	Fairbanks, Alaska; 1 October 2023 by Russell M. Nelson; 27 September 2025 by Peter M. Johnson; 10,000 sq ft (930 m^{2}) on a 7.59-acre (3.07 ha) site

== See also ==
- The Church of Jesus Christ of Latter-day Saints membership statistics (United States)
