= Madrid Spain Temple =

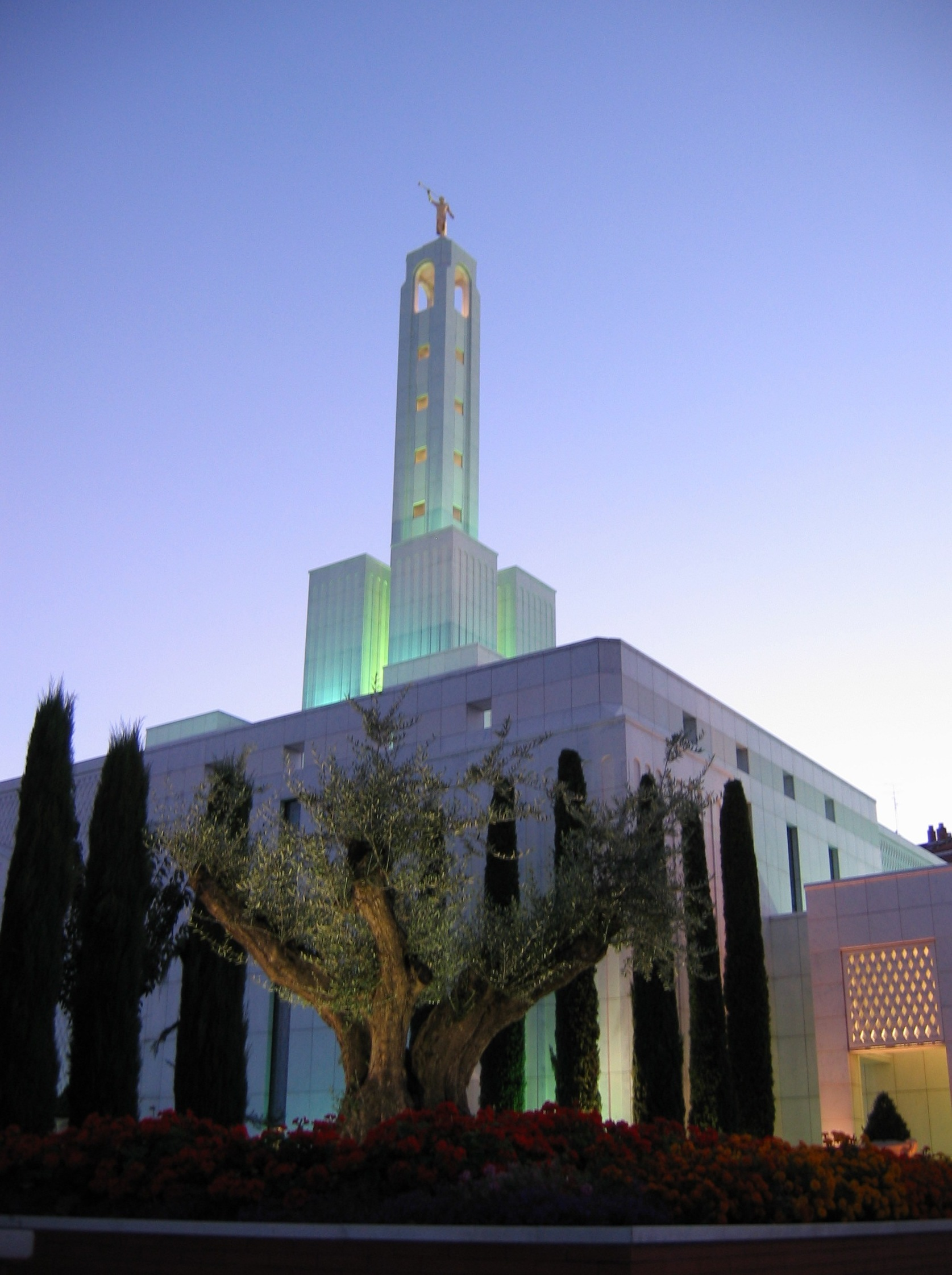
- Interactive map of Madrid Spain Temple
- Number: 56
- Dedication: 19 March 1999, by Gordon B. Hinckley
- Site: 3.5 acres (1.4 ha)
- Floor area: 45,800 ft^{2} (4,250 m^{2})
- Official website • News & images

Church chronology
| ← Colonia Juárez Chihuahua Mexico Temple | Madrid Spain Temple | → Bogotá Colombia Temple |

Additional information
- Announced: 4 April 1993, by Ezra Taft Benson
- Groundbreaking: 11 June 1996, by Gordon B. Hinckley
- Open house: 20 February – 13 March 1999
- Current president: Rafael Muñoz Campos
- Designed by: Arquitechior Langdon, SA.
- Location: Madrid, Spain
- Coordinates: 40°24′0.323999″N 3°37′53.68800″W
- Exterior finish: Italian Camaro Marble
- Design: Classic modern, single-spire design
- Baptistries: 1
- Ordinance rooms: 4 (stationary)
- Sealing rooms: 4
- Clothing rental: Yes

The Madrid Spain Temple is a temple of the Church of Jesus Christ of Latter-day Saints located in the Pavones neighborhood of Moratalaz, Madrid. Announced on April 4, 1993, by Gordon B. Hinckley, first counselor in the church's First Presidency, during general conference, it became the first temple in Spain and the seventh in Europe.

The three-story building is approximately 45,800-square-feet, with Italian marble on the exterior, and has a single spire with a statue of the angel Moroni. It is within a multi-building church-owned complex that previously included an adjacent missionary training center (MTC), which was closed in 2019 as part of a global restructuring of church training facilities.

A groundbreaking took place on June 11, 1996, with Hinckley, who by then was serving as church president, presiding. It was the first time a church president had visited Spain. After construction was completed, a public open house was held in February and March 1999. The temple was dedicated between March 19 and 21, 1999, by Hinckley. During the trip to dedicate the temple, Hinckley met King Juan Carlos and Queen Sofía.

== History ==
On April 4, 1993, Gordon B. Hinckley, then first counselor in the First Presidency, announced during general conference that property was being acquired for a temple in Spain. The site was then identified as being in Madrid on October 9, 1993. The temple complex occupies 3.5 acres in the Pavones neighborhood of Moratalaz (Madrid) at Calle del Templo 2.

The groundbreaking ceremony took place on June 11, 1996, presided over by Hinckley, and attended by more than 2,000 people, marking his first visit to Spain as church president. The multi-building complex includes a meetinghouse, family history center, patron and missionary housing, and distribution center. These were completed by early 1999.

A public open house was held February 20–March 13, 1999, with approximately 7,000 visitors touring the temple on its first day, including Spanish, Portuguese, and French members. Following the open house, the dedication took place March 19–21, 1999, conducted in ten sessions by Hinckley.

The temple was the first in Spain and the Iberian Peninsula, serving church members throughout Spain, Portugal, the Canary Islands, and southern France. The MTC on the complex opened in 1999, and was closed in January 2019 following the church’s announcement of adjustments to international MTC operations.

== Design and architecture ==
The Madrid Spain Temple is a modern-classical design, with an exterior of Italian Camaro marble, creating a white appearance in order to stand out from nearby older buildings made with gray stone. The design was created by a local architecture firm.

The temple is on a 3.5-acre (≈1.4 ha) parcel at Calle del Templo 2, part of a large church campus including a meetinghouse, family history center, distribution center, housing facilities, and an eight-story office building—an area often referred to as Madrid’s “temple square.” Landscaping includes Spanish olive trees, Mediterranean cypress, and a large fountain at the plaza entrance. The words ““Holiness to the Lord: The House of the Lord” are above a front facing window.

The temple is approximately 45,800 square feet, and is 116 by 138 feet. It has a single spire with a statue of the angel Moroni, which symbolizes the restoration of the gospel, and his role in Latter-day Saint belief that he delivered the golden plates (which later became the Book of Mormon) to church founder Joseph Smith. The temple has four instruction rooms, four sealing rooms, and a baptistry.

== Cultural and community impact ==
Before the 1999 public open house, representatives from Spain’s major media outlets, educators, and government leaders, including the mayor of Madrid, José María Álvarez del Manzano, and the personal confessor to the King of Spain, Bartolome Vicens Fiol, visited the temple. Fiol stated he was touched by the beauty of the temple, and that he was the first official visitor sent from by the Vatican that was received by the church in Salt Lake City.

When Hinkley visited Spain for the open house and dedication, he and church representatives met King Juan Carlos and Queen Sofía at the royal palace in Madrid, where he presented the royal couple with a Lladró "Christus" figurine, along with CDs by the Tabernacle Choir. Hinkley remarked that the visit was very pleasant, and that the king gave him a "warm embrace" at the end of their meeting.

== See also ==
- Comparison of temples of The Church of Jesus Christ of Latter-day Saints
- List of temples of The Church of Jesus Christ of Latter-day Saints
- List of temples of The Church of Jesus Christ of Latter-day Saints by geographic region
- Temple architecture (Latter-day Saints)

== Additional reading ==
- "Construction well under way on Madrid temple", Church News, November 16, 1996
- Harmon, Carolee L. (March 6, 1999), "Sacred edifice to 'change lives' of many in Spain", Church News
- Avant, Gerry (March 27, 1999), "Cover Story: Temple dedicated in Madrid, Spain", Church News
- Avant, Gerry (March 27, 1999), "Madrid's temple square", Church News
