= Ben B. Banks =

American Mormon leader (born 1932)

Second Quorum of the Seventy
- April 1, 1989 – June 6, 1992
- Called by: Ezra Taft Benson
- End reason: Transferred to the First Quorum of the Seventy

First Quorum of the Seventy
- June 6, 1992 – October 5, 2002
- Called by: Ezra Taft Benson
- End reason: Granted general authority emeritus status

Presidency of the Seventy
- August 15, 1999 – August 15, 2002
- Called by: Gordon B. Hinckley
- End reason: Honorably released

Emeritus general authority
- October 5, 2002
- Called by: Gordon B. Hinckley

Personal details
- Born: Benjamin Berry Banks; April 4, 1932 (age 93); Salt Lake City, Utah, United States

Benjamin Berry Banks (born April 4, 1932) has been a general authority of the Church of Jesus Christ of Latter-day Saints (LDS Church) since 1989. He was a member of the seven-man Presidency of the Seventy from 1999 to 2002 and has also been president of the church's Jordan River Utah Temple.

Banks was born on April 4, 1932, in Salt Lake City, Utah, to Ben F. Banks and Chloa Berry Banks. His father died when Ben was two years old.

== LDS Church service ==
Before becoming a general authority, Banks served in the church as a stake president and bishop. From 1987 to 1989 he was president of the church's Scotland Edinburgh Mission.

On April 1, 1989, Banks became a member of the Second Quorum of the Seventy; he was transferred to the First Quorum of the Seventy in 1992. As a general authority, Banks served as an assistant director of the church's historical department. He was president of the church's Utah South Area during the late 1990s. In 1997, Banks presided at the groundbreaking for the Monticello Utah Temple.

In 2002, Banks was designated as an emeritus general authority and became president of the Jordan River Utah Temple, where he served until 2005.

== Personal life ==
Banks married Susan Kearnes and they have eight children. In September 2005, Banks and his wife became the directors of Church Hosting.

His wife, Susan, died July 5, 2022, in Salt Lake City, Utah at the age of 90.

== Selected speeches ==
- In 1997, he gave a devotional titled [https://speeches.byu.edu/talks/ben-b-banks/lords-plan-for-peace/ "The Lord’s Plan for Peace"] at Brigham Young University.
- In 2001, he addressed BYU students in a devotional titled [https://speeches.byu.edu/talks/ben-b-banks/prepare-lifes-journey/ "Prepare for Your Future—Life’s Journey"].
- His 2005 commencement address at BYU was titled [https://speeches.byu.edu/talks/ben-b-banks/go-forth-serve/"Go Forth to Serve"].
