= Monticello Utah Temple =

Temple of The Church of Jesus Christ of Latter-day Saints

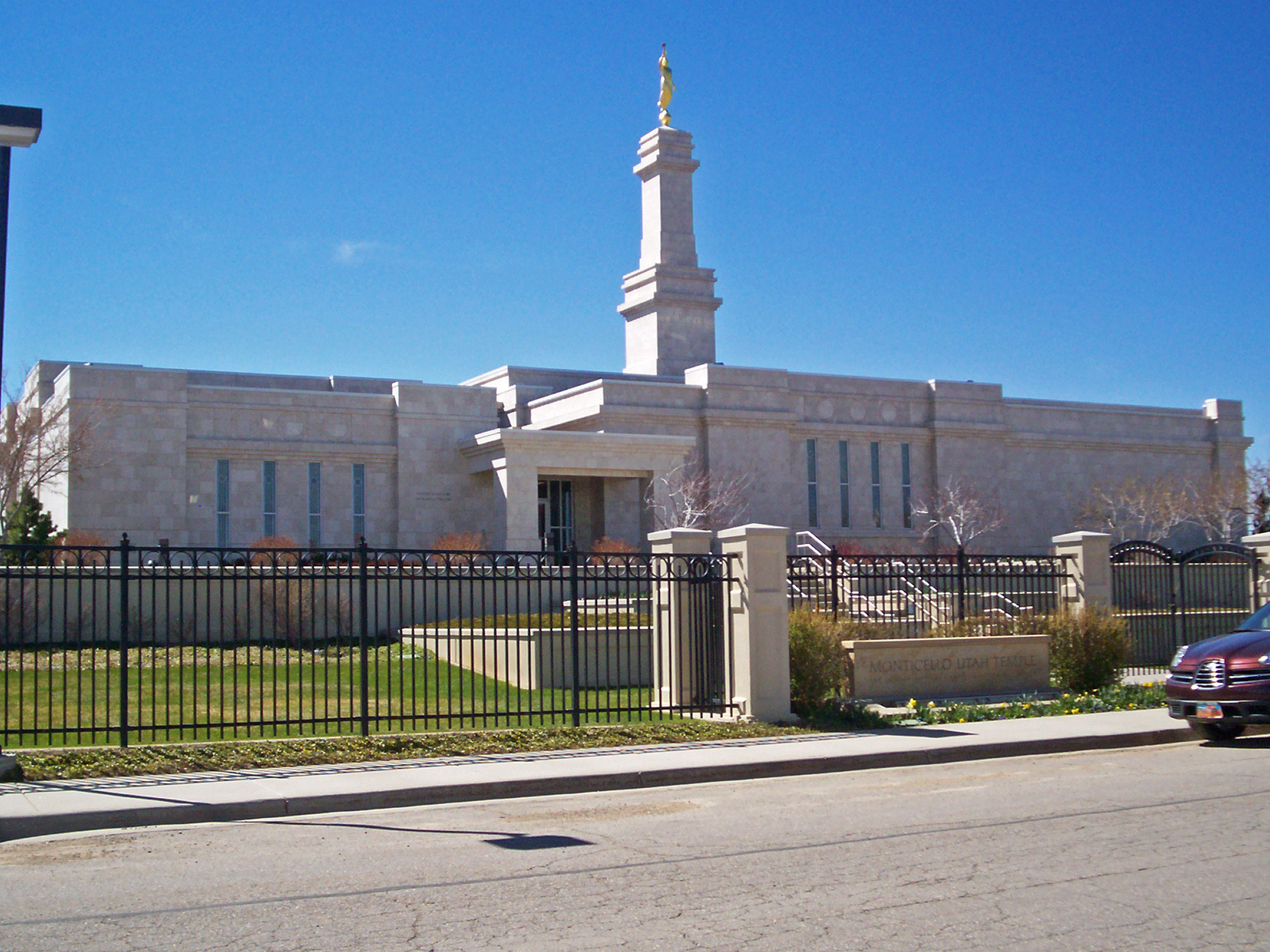
- Interactive map of Monticello Utah Temple
- Number: 53
- Dedication: July 26, 1998, by Gordon B. Hinckley
- Site: 1.33 acres (0.54 ha)
- Floor area: 11,225 ft^{2} (1,042.8 m^{2})
- Height: 66 ft (20 m)
- Official website • News & images

Church chronology
← Preston England Temple	Monticello Utah Temple	→ Anchorage Alaska Temple

Additional information
- Announced: October 4, 1997, by Gordon B. Hinckley
- Groundbreaking: November 17, 1997, by Ben B. Banks
- Open house: July 16–18, 1998; November 2–9, 2002
- Rededicated: November 17, 2002, by Gordon B. Hinckley
- Designed by: Church A&E Services
- Location: Monticello, Utah, United States
- Coordinates: 37°52′40.85399″N 109°20′49.99560″W
- Exterior finish: Turkish off-white marble
- Design: Classic modern, single-spire design
- Baptistries: 1
- Ordinance rooms: 2 (Movie, two-stage progressive)
- Sealing rooms: 2

The Monticello Utah Temple is the 53rd operating temple of the Church of Jesus Christ of Latter-day Saints located in Monticello, Utah. The intent to build the temple was announced on October 4, 1997, by church president Gordon B. Hinckley during general conference. The temple is the first in San Juan County, and the eleventh in Utah at the time of its dedication.

The temple has a single spire that has a statue of the angel Moroni. It was the first of a new generation of smaller temples announced by Hinckley, with a more compact design to serve Latter-day Saints in remote areas. A groundbreaking ceremony, signifying the beginning of construction, was held on November 17, 1997, conducted by Ben B. Banks.

== History ==
The Monticello Utah Temple was announced by church president Gordon B. Hinckley on October 4, 1997, during general conference. In the same month, Hinckley announced the building of smaller temples throughout the world to increase access for those in remote areas. Monticello chosen as the site for the first of these.

On November 17, 1997, a groundbreaking ceremony was held on a 1.33-acre property located at 365 North 200 West in Monticello, Utah. The ceremony was presided over by Ben B. Banks, president of the church's Utah South Area, and attended by approximately 2,550 church members and community leaders. The groundbreaking marked the beginning of a rapid construction process, with the temple completed in just eight months and nine days—making it the fastest-built temple in the church's history to that point.

Located at the base of the Abajo Mountains, the temple's exterior is finished in a marble called Noah's Crème. Thirteen thousand tiles used on the temple were evaluated carefully to ensure a uniform effect.

A public open house was held from July 16 to July 18, 1998, during which approximately 20,350 visitors toured the temple. During the open house, an unusual event occurred when thousands of moths covered the temple grounds and walls one morning. As volunteers began cleaning, starlings (that were nesting in unusually large amounts in the area) began to eat the moths, aiding in the cleanup effort, with most moths gone in 20 minutes. The temple was dedicated on July 26, 1998.

Initially, the temple featured a white angel Moroni statue on its spire. However, on May 25, 1999, this was replaced with a taller, gold-leafed version to enhance its visibility against cloudy skies.

In April 2002, the temple began a significant renovation, resulting in an expansion from 7,000 to 11,225 square feet. The expansion added a second ordinance room, a sealing room, and other facilities to better serve patrons. Following a public open house from November 2 to November 9, 2002, the renovated temple was rededicated by Hinckley on November 17, 2002.

At the time of its dedication, the temple served nearly 13,000 church members in the surrounding Utah areas of Monticello, Blanding, Moab, along with areas in Colorado surrounding Durango and Grand Junction.

In 2020, like all the church's others, the Monticello Utah Temple was closed for a time in response to the COVID-19 pandemic.

== Design and architecture ==
The temple is on a 1.33-acre plot at 365 North 200 West in Monticello, Utah, with surrounding landscaping of gardens and lawns, designed to provide a tranquil setting to enhance the site's sacred atmosphere. The single-story structure was originally constructed with approximately 7,000 square feet of floor space. In 2002, the temple was expanded to 11,225 square feet to better accommodate patron needs.

The exterior has off-white marble imported from Turkey, along with tall art-glass windows from Germany. A spire on a square base is above the center of the temple, originally with a white angel Moroni statue, which was later replaced by a taller, gold-leafed Moroni to improve its visibility against the sky.

The temple's interior includes a celestial room and a baptistry. The 2002 expansion added a second ordinance room and sealing room, as well as a waiting room, administrative offices, and a laundry.

The design has elements representing Latter-day Saint beliefs, to provide spiritual meaning to the temple's appearance and function. This includes the angel Moroni statue which symbolizes the restoration of the gospel and the role of the Book of Mormon in Latter-day Saint theology. The temple is both a place of worship and an architectural landmark in Monticello.

== Temple presidents ==
The church's temples are directed by a temple president and matron, each serving for a term of three years. The president and matron oversee the administration of temple operations and provide guidance and training for both temple patrons and staff. Serving from 1998 to 2001, Lisle G. Adams was the first president, with Jewell R. Adams as matron. As of 2024, Scott E. Boyle is the president, with Cassie S. Boyle serving as matron.

== Admittance ==
On May 16, 1998, the church announced the public open house that was held from July 16 to July 18, 1998, excluding Sundays. The temple was dedicated by Gordon B. Hinckley on July 26, 1998, in eight sessions.

Like all the church's temples, it is not used for Sunday worship services. To members of the church, temples are regarded as sacred houses of the Lord. Once dedicated, only church members with a current temple recommend can enter for worship.

== See also ==
Temples in Utah
Wasatch Front Temples
Temples along the Wasatch Front
- = Operating
- = Under construction
- = Announced
- = Temporarily Closed

- The Church of Jesus Christ of Latter-day Saints in Utah
- Comparison of temples of The Church of Jesus Christ of Latter-day Saints
- List of temples of The Church of Jesus Christ of Latter-day Saints
- List of temples of The Church of Jesus Christ of Latter-day Saints by geographic region
- Temple architecture (Latter-day Saints)

== Additional reading ==
- Lloyd, R. Scott (November 22, 1997), "San Juan saints match grandeur of rock formations", Church News
- "Open house, dedication set for Monticello temple", Church News, May 16, 1998
- Boyle, Bill (May 23, 1998), "Statue of Angel Moroni placed on top of temple", Church News
- Lloyd, R. Scott (July 18, 1998), "Monticello temple opens doors to public", Church News
- van Orden, Dell (August 1, 1998), "Inspiration came for smaller temples on trip to Mexico", Church News
- "Monticello temple to open doors after expansion", Church News, September 14, 2002
- Hill, Greg (November 23, 2002), "Monticello temple expands to match faith of members", Church News
