= The Church of Jesus Christ of Latter-day Saints in Nicaragua =

- Area: Central America
- Members: 106,953 (2025)
- Stakes: 12
- Districts: 4
- Wards: 71
- Branches: 38
- Total congregations: 109
- Missions: 2
- Temples: 1 under construction
- FamilySearch Centers: 35

The Church of Jesus Christ of Latter-day Saints in Nicaragua refers to the Church of Jesus Christ of Latter-day Saints (LDS Church) and its members in Nicaragua. The first convert was baptized in 1954 and the first Nicaraguan mission opened in 1989. It has since grown to more than 100,000 members in more than 100 congregations in Nicaragua.

== History ==
Membership in Nicaragua
Year	Membership
1977	2,606
1979	3,346
1989*	2,100
1999	31,747
2009	63,964
2019	100,331
2026	106,953
*Membership was published as an estimated number. Source: Wendall J. Ashton; Jim M. Wall, Deseret News, various years, Church Almanac Country Information: Nicaragua

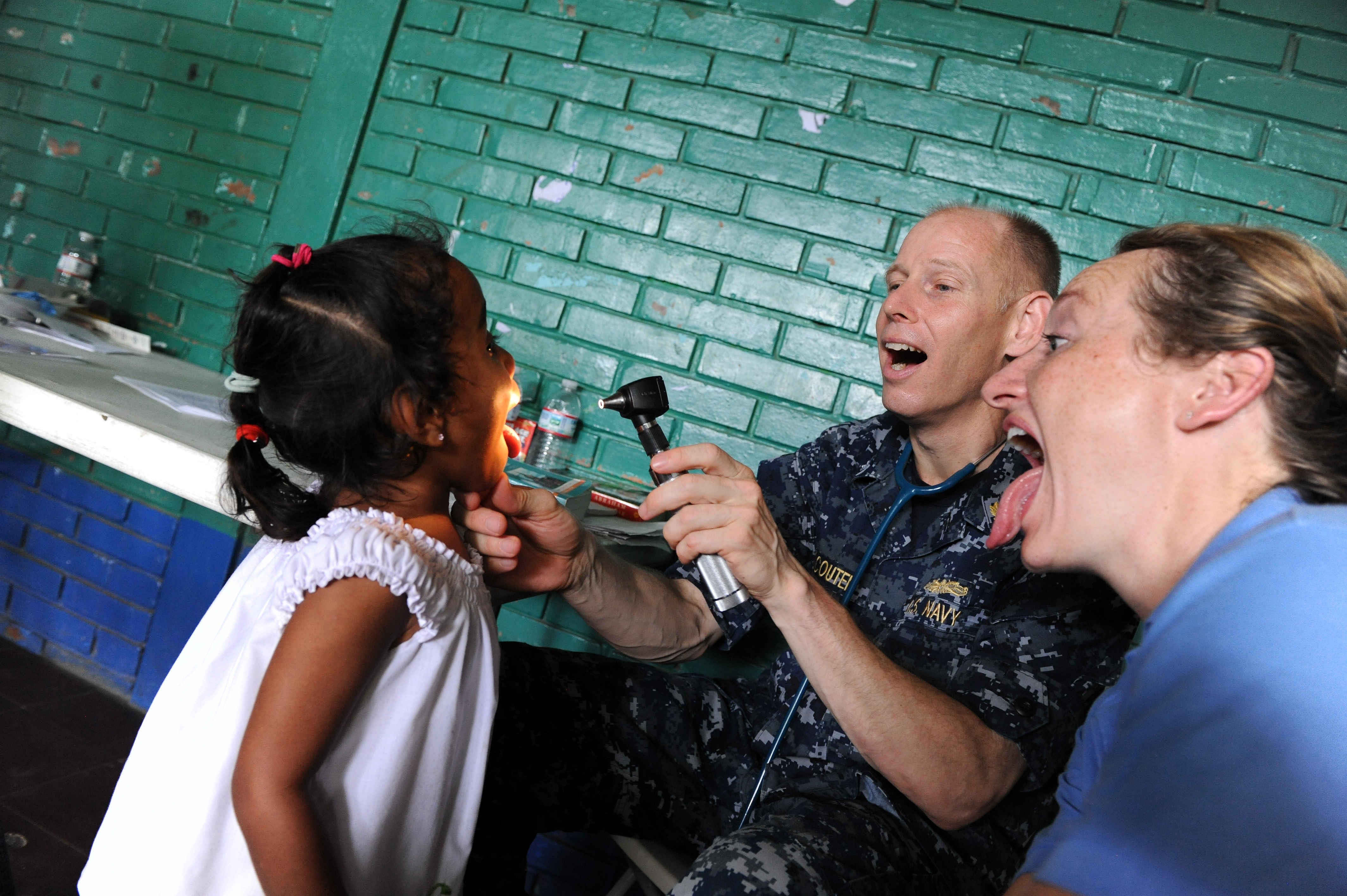
Commander William Scouten, from Chesapeake, VA, and Nicki Brody, from Phoenix, AZ, a nurse with Latter-day Saints Charities, examine a patient at the Escuela Humberto Mendez Juarez medical site during a Continuing Promise 2011 medical community service event.

The first missionaries entered the country in 1953. The first Nicaraguan convert, José de Guzman, was baptized on April 11, 1954, a year after the first missionaries arrived in the country. These missionaries, Elders Manuel Arias and Archie R. Mortensen, were serving in the Central American Mission, which Elder Spencer W. Kimball organized in 1952. In 1959, the first Nicaraguan district was formed. The first stake (the Managua Stake) was created in March 1981 and reorganized in June 1998. Several natural disasters and political crises, including an earthquake that devastated Managua in 1972 and a civil war that began in the late 1970s, slowed missionary work throughout the 1970s and '80s. Foreign missionaries were removed from the country in 1980, and locals continued the work until full-time missionaries returned about ten years later. The first Nicaraguan members entered the temple in Guatemala City in 1987. The Nicaragua Managua Mission opened in October 1989.

In April 2018, church president Russell M. Nelson announced the first temple of the Church of Jesus Christ of Latter-day Saints to be built in Nicaragua. The Managua Nicaragua Temple was announced at the same time as six other temples. In May 2018, a church spokesman announced that all missionaries would be removed from Nicaragua until further notice.

A brief history can be found at LDS Newsroom (Nicaragua) or Deseret News 2010 Church Almanac (Nicaragua).

== Stakes and Districts ==
As of May 2025, Nicaragua had the following stakes and districts:

Stake	Organized	Mission
Chinandega Nicaragua Stake	25 Jun 2000	Nicaragua Managua North
Chinandega Nicaragua West Stake	14 Jun 2009	Nicaragua Managua North
Esteli Nicaragua District	25 Jun 2006	Nicaragua Managua North
Granada Nicaragua District	11 Jun 1991	Nicaragua Managua South
Jinotepe Nicaragua Stake	9 May 2004	Nicaragua Managua South
Juigalpa Nicaragua District	12 Nov 2006	Nicaragua Managua South
Leon Nicaragua Stake	25 Feb 2007	Nicaragua Managua North
Managua Nicaragua Stake	22 Mar 1981	Nicaragua Managua South
Managua Nicaragua Bello Horizonte Stake	8 May 2005	Nicaragua Managua North
Managua Nicaragua Las Américas Stake	21 Nov 2004	Nicaragua Managua North
Managua Nicaragua Universitaria Stake	30 Jan 2005	Nicaragua Managua South
Managua Nicaragua Villa Flor Stake	30 May 2004	Nicaragua Managua North
Masatepe Nicaragua Stake	9 Jul 2017	Nicaragua Managua South
Masaya Nicaragua Stake	20 Feb 2005	Nicaragua Managua South
Matagalpa Nicaragua Stake	2 Oct 1990	Nicaragua Managua North
Puerto Cabezas Nicaragua District	24 Oct 2010	Nicaragua Managua North

== Missions ==
Mission	Organized
Nicaragua Managua North	30 Jun 2010
Nicaragua Managua South	15 Oct 1989

== Temples ==
225. Managua Nicaragua Temple (Dedication scheduled); Official website; News & images	
Location: Announced: Groundbreaking: Open House: Dedicated: Size:	Managua, Nicaragua; 1 April 2018 by Russell M. Nelson; 26 November 2022 by Taylor G. Godoy; 10-26 September 2026 scheduled for 18 October 2026; 24,500 sq ft (2,280 m^{2}) on a 8.9-acre (3.6 ha) site
