= The Church of Jesus Christ of Latter-day Saints in Kenya =

- Area: Africa Central
- Members: 24,547 (2025)
- Stakes: 4
- Districts: 10
- Wards: 23
- Branches: 79
- Total congregations: 102
- Missions: 2
- Temples: 1 operating
- FamilySearch Centers: 17

The Church of Jesus Christ of Latter-day Saints in Kenya refers to the Church of Jesus Christ of Latter-day Saints (LDS Church) and its members in Kenya. In 1981, two small congregations were created in Kenya (Nairobi and Kiboko). In 2025, there were 24,547 members in 57 congregations. On April 2, 2017, church president Thomas S. Monson announced that a temple would be built in Nairobi.

== History ==
Membership in Kenya
Year	Membership
1987	99
1989*	300
1995*	2,200
1999	4,039
2004	6,832
2009	9,370
2014	12,471
2019	14,591
2024	21,204
2025	24,547
*Membership was published as a rounded number. Source: Wendall J. Ashton; Jim M. Wall, Deseret News, various years, Church Almanac Country Information: Kenya

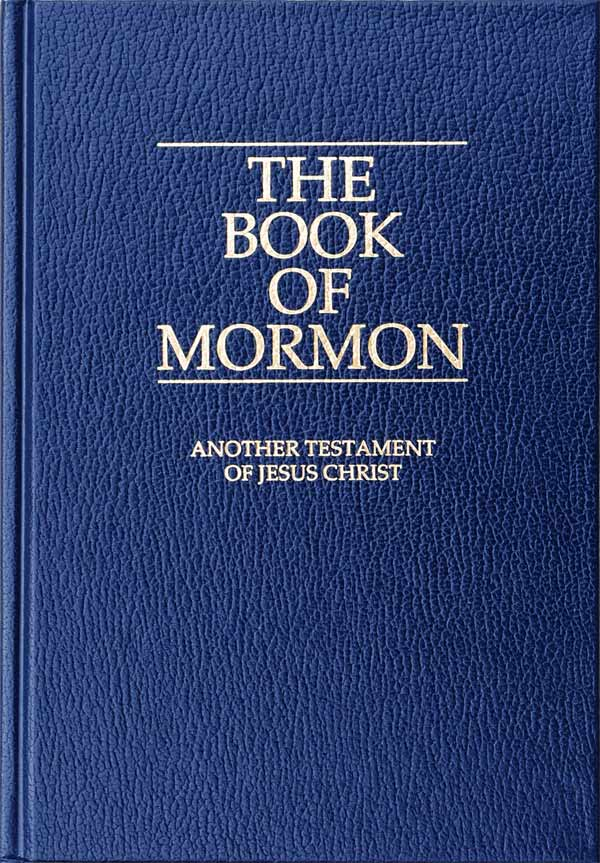
English

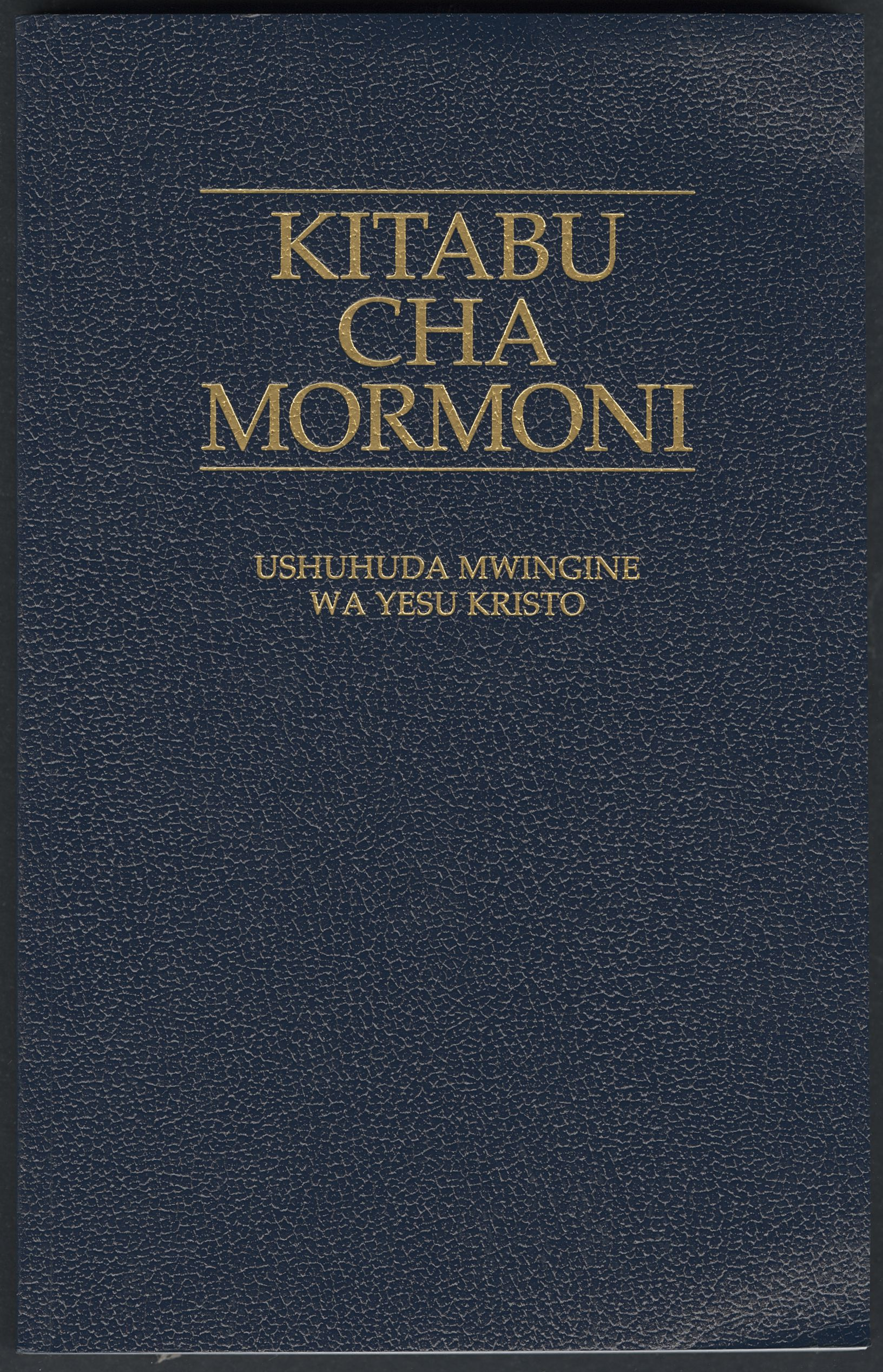
Swahili

The Book of Mormon in languages spoken in Kenya. The Kisii (Gusii) translation, which only selections have been translated, is not pictured.

The first Kenyans baptized into the LDS Church in Kenya were the family of Elizaphan and Ebisiba Osaka, who were baptized in 1979. The first LDS missionaries began serving in Kenya in 1980. There was only one LDS missionary couple from then until 1989, when the couple was withdrawn. Joseph W. Sitati, who joined the LDS Church along with his family in 1985, was designated the lead elder of the church in Kenya at that point. In February 1991, he met with Daniel arap Moi, president of Kenya. Later that month the attorney general of Kenya gave Sitati and a few other church leaders a form signifying the church was officially recognized.

In July 1991, the Kenya Nairobi Mission was organized, with Larry King Brown as president. The first LDS meeting house was completed in Nairobi in 1994. In 2001 a stake was organized, with Sitati called as president. Sitati later became the first general authority from Kenya. In March 2016, the Nairobi Kenya Stake was divided to form the east and west stake.

In 2020, the mission headquartered in Nairobi mission was divided with the creation of the Tanzania Dar es Salaam Mission. In August 2020, the church organized the new Africa Central Area with its headquarters in Nairobi. The new area oversees the church in 18 countries.

== Stakes and districts ==
Stake/District	Organized	Mission
Bomet Kenya District	8 Mar 2026	Kenya Kisumu
Bungoma Kenya District	7 Dec 2025	Kenya Kisumu
Busia Kenya District	13 Jan 2019	Kenya Kisumu
Eldoret Kenya District	24 Apr 2011	Kenya Kisumu
Kilungu Hills Kenya District	12 Oct 2014	Kenya Nairobi East
Kisii Kenya District	20 Sep 2026	Kenya Kisumu
Kisumu Kenya District	16 Jun 2019	Kenya Kisumu
Kitale Kenya District	9 Apr 2019	Kenya Kisumu
Kwale Kenya District	24 May 2026	Kenya Nairobi East
Kyulu Kenya Stake	14 July 2024	Kenya Nairobi East
Makindu Kenya District	7 Dec 2025	Kenya Nairobi East
Mombasa Kenya District	25 Oct 2015	Kenya Nairobi East
Nairobi Kenya East Stake	9 Sep 2001	Kenya Nairobi West
Nairobi Kenya South Stake	5 Mar 2023	Kenya Nairobi East
Nairobi Kenya West Stake	20 Mar 2016	Kenya Nairobi West
Nakuru Kenya District	11 May 2025	Kenya Nairobi West
Vihiga Kenya District	23 Mar 2025	Kenya Kisumu

== Missions ==
- Kenya Nairobi West Mission
- Kenya Nairobi East Mission
- Kenya Kisumu Mission (1 July 2026)

== Temples ==
On April 2, 2017, Thomas S. Monson announced the intent to construct the Nairobi Kenya Temple in the church's general conference.

204. Nairobi Kenya Temple; Official website; News & images	
Location: Announced: Groundbreaking: Dedicated: Size:	Nairobi, Kenya; 2 April 2017 by Thomas S. Monson; 11 September 2021 by Joseph W. Sitati; 18 May 2025 by Ulisses Soares; 19,870 sq ft (1,846 m^{2}) on a 3.435-acre (1.390 ha) site

== See also ==
- Religion in Kenya
