= The Church of Jesus Christ of Latter-day Saints in Cameroon =

- Area: Africa Central
- Members: 3,673 (2025)
- Stakes: 1
- Districts: 1
- Wards: 5
- Branches: 15
- Total Congregations: 20
- Missions: 1
- FamilySearch Centers: 3

The Church of Jesus Christ of Latter-day Saints in Cameroon refers to the Church of Jesus Christ of Latter-day Saints (LDS Church) and its members in Cameroon. The first branch was organized in Yaoundé in 1992. In 2025, there were 3,673 members in 20 congregations.

== History ==
Membership in Cameroon
Year	Membership
1993	99
1999	194
2004	278
2009	843
2014	1,498
2019	2,245
2023	3,071
2025	3,673

Membership in Central African Republic
Year	Membership
1993	99
1999	135
2004	218
2009	393
2014	216
2019	248
2023	278
2025	357

Membership in Gabon
Year	Membership
2009	15
2014	104
2018	302
2023*	550
*Estimated membership

Cameroon's first sacrament meeting was held in Yaounde on July 21, 1974. The first Cameroonian Latter-day Saints to live in Cameroon were baptized abroad and arrived in the 1980s. By 1984, there were 6 known members in Cameroon. One of these, Paul S. Carpenter, baptized his daughter, Susanne, in Yaounde on March 19, 1984. This was the first known baptism in the country. The first missionaries, a missionary couple in Nigeria was assigned to Cameroon for 3 weeks to locate members. Other missionaries followed in 1992 when the Cameroon Yaoundé Mission was organized and included Equatorial Guinea and Gabon, but then relocated its headquarters to Abidjan, Côte d'Ivoire on May 18, 1993. The Church obtained legal status from the government in 1993. Seminary and institute were both functioning by 1995. In 1998, the Africa Area was Split into two areas (Africa West Area) and (Africa South Area). Cameroon was assigned to the Africa West Area in 1998.

The first temple trip for members in Cameroon was in August 2005, shortly after the Aba Nigeria Temple was dedicated. To get there, members would often push the vehicles they were riding in through the mud. In August 2009, Apostle Elder Jeffrey R. Holland, the first apostle to visit the country, dedicated Cameroon for the preaching of the gospel. In 2020, Cameroon was reassigned to the newly organized Africa Central Area.

=== Humanitarian Efforts ===
As of early 2011, LDS humanitarian and development work has been limited to a clean water project in Ngambe and Pong. Prospects for additional clean water projects appear high. Latter-day Saint Charities also partners with Relief International in providing support for improving healthcare and other basic services in the country.

=== Central African Republic ===
In 1992, 2 small branches were formed in Bangui and shortly afterwards consolidated to one branch. In 2012 Elder Jeffrey R. Holland dedicated the Central African Republic for missionary work. As of 2022, the Bangui Branch is the only congregation in the Central African Republic.

=== Gabon ===
In 2013, the Libreville branch was formed. Also that year, Elder David A. Bednar of the Quorum of the Twelve Apostles dedicated Gabon for preaching, with the first young missionaries arriving in January 2014. A second branch in Libreville was formed in 2016.

== Districts and Congregations ==
LDS Church Locations as of August 2025
Green = Stake
Orange = District
Purple = Branch not part of a stake or district
(FHC) = Family History Center

As of May 2026, Cameroon had the following stakes and districts:

Douala Cameroon District

- Bonaberi 1st Branch
- Bonaberi 2nd Branch
- Bonedale Branch
- Deido Branch
- Douala Branch
- Japoma Branch
- Mabanda Branch
- New Bell Branch
- Village Branch

Yaounde Cameroon Stake

- Anguissa Ward
- Bastos Ward
- Biyem-Assi Ward
- Ekounou Branch
- Eleveur Branch
- Katanga Branch
- Messassi Ward
- Mimboman Ward
- Oyom Abang Branch
- Obili Branch (English)
- Soa Branch

Other congregations within the Cameroon Mission:

Cameroon

- Kribi Branch
- Lolodorf Branch
- Mbalmayo Branch

Bangui Central African Republic District

- Bangui 1st Branch
- Bangui 2nd Branch
- Bangui 3rd Branch

Equatorial Guinea

There are no publicly known congregations in Equatorial Guinea. Membership is estimated at being less than 20.

Libreville Gabon District

- Libreville 1st Branch
- Libreville 2nd Branch
- Owendo Branch
- PK12 Branch
- Université Branch (Libreville)

Gabon (Other locations)

- Port-Gentil Branch

Missionwide

- Cameroon Yaoundé Dispersed Members Unit

The Cameroon Yaoundé Dispersed Members Unit serves individuals and families not in proximity to a meetinghouse. Congregations not in a stake are called branches, regardless of size.

== Missions ==
The first missionaries that arrived in Cameroon were assigned to Nigeria and only stayed 3 weeks in September 1991. Two couple missionaries were sent from Canada the next year. The Cameroon Yaoundé Mission was organized on 1 July 1992 before moving its mission headquarters to Abidjan, Ivory Coast on May 18, 1993. On September 9, 1999, Paul Biya, president of Cameroon, approved recognition the LDS Church's on September 9, 1993. On July 5, 1994, Missionaries were temporarily withdrawn from Cameroon because of potential war between Nigeria and Cameroon. Cameroon was reassigned from the Côte d'Ivoire Abidjan Mission to the newly created Ghana Cape Coast Mission in 2005. Sometime between 2005 and 2008, Cameroon was reassigned to the Democratic Republic of Congo Kinshasa Mission. In August 2009, Apostle Elder Jeffrey R. Holland, the first apostle to visit the country, dedicated Cameroon for the preaching of the gospel. Cameroon was assigned to the Republic of Congo Brazzaville Mission in 2014. On July 1, 2020, the Cameroon Yaoundé Mission was once again organized and comprises Cameroon, Gabon, Equatorial Guinea, and the Central African Republic.

== Temples ==
There are no temples in Cameroon. Cameroon is currently located within the Kinshasa Democratic Republic of the Congo Temple District.

== See also ==
- Religion in Cameroon
