= The Church of Jesus Christ of Latter-day Saints in Bolivia =

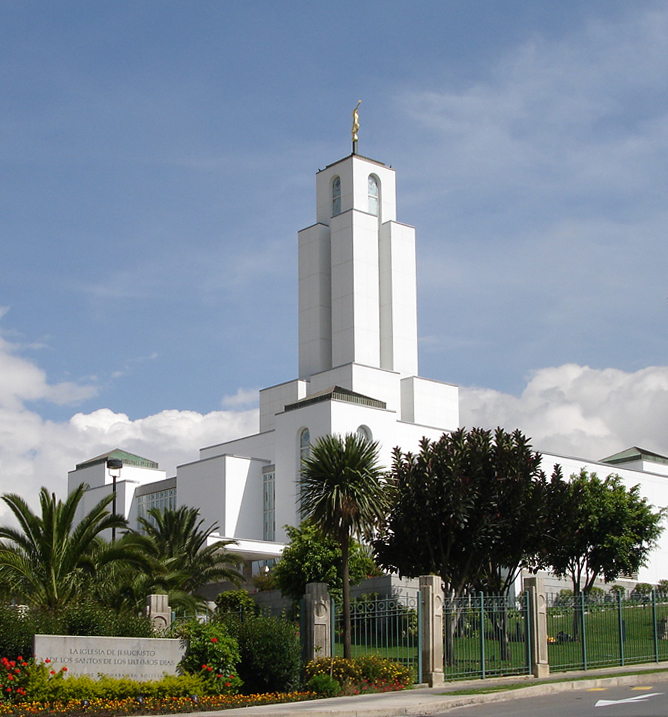
- The Cochabamba Bolivia Temple
- Area: South America Northwest
- Members: 235,773 (2025)
- Stakes: 33
- Districts: 8
- Wards: 220
- Branches: 70
- Total Congregations: 290
- Missions: 6
- Temples: 1 operating; 1 under construction; 1 announced; 3 total
- FamilySearch Centers: 72

The Church of Jesus Christ of Latter-day Saints in Bolivia refers to the Church of Jesus Christ of Latter-day Saints (LDS Church) and its members in Bolivia. The first small branch meeting was held in 1964 with 19 people in attendance. As of December 31, 2025, Bolivia had 235,773 members in 290 congregations. Bolivia ranks as having the 6th most members of the LDS Church in South America.

== History ==
Membership in Bolivia
| Year | Membership |
|---|---|
| 1965 | 24 |
| 1970 | 1,685 |
| 1979 | 15,257 |
| 1989* | 55,000 |
| 1999 | 112,222 |
| 2009 | 163,119 |
| 2019 | 212,148 |
| 2025 | 235,773 |
*Membership was published as an estimated or rounded number. Source: Windall J. Ashton; Jim M. Wall, Deseret News, various years, Church Almanac Country Information: Bolivia

== Stakes and districts ==
| Stake/District | Organized | Mission |
|---|---|---|
| Achacachi Bolivia District | 5 Sep 1976 | Bolivia La Paz El Alto |
| Bermejo Bolivia District | 15 May 1992 | Bolivia Santa Cruz |
| Cobija Bolivia District | 27 Jul 1997 | Bolivia La Paz |
| Cochabamba Bolivia Aeropuerto Stake | 12 Nov 2017 | Bolivia Cochabamba South |
| Cochabamba Bolivia Alalay Stake | 10 Dec 1995 | Bolivia Cochabamba South |
| Cochabamba Bolivia Blanco Galindo Stake | 12 Nov 2017 | Bolivia Cochabamba North |
| Cochabamba Bolivia Quillacollo Stake | 16 May 1993 | Bolivia Cochabamba North |
| Cochabamba Bolivia Sacaba Stake | 14 Oct 2012 | Bolivia Cochabamba North |
| Cochabamba Bolivia Sarco Stake | 19 Feb 1984 | Bolivia Cochabamba North |
| Cochabamba Bolivia Universidad Stake | 9 Sep 1979 | Bolivia Cochabamba North |
| El Alto Bolivia Stake | 24 Nov 1991 | Bolivia La Paz El Alto |
| El Alto Bolivia Litoral Stake | 1 Dec 2013 | Bolivia La Paz El Alto |
| El Alto Bolivia Los Andes Stake | 10 Jun 2007 | Bolivia La Paz El Alto |
| El Alto Bolivia Satélite Stake | 18 Jan 1981 | Bolivia La Paz El Alto |
| Guayaramerín Bolivia District | 29 May 1990 | Bolivia Santa Cruz North |
| La Paz Bolivia Alto San Pedro Stake | 30 Jun 1996 | Bolivia La Paz |
| La Paz Bolivia Calacoto Stake | 17 Jan 1988 | Bolivia La Paz |
| La Paz Bolivia Constitución Stake | 24 Feb 1980 | Bolivia La Paz |
| La Paz Bolivia Copacabana Stake | 18 Nov 2012 | Bolivia La Paz |
| La Paz Bolivia Miraflores Stake | 6 Mar 1979 | Bolivia La Paz |
| Llallagua Bolivia District | 7 Jan 1996 | Bolivia La Paz El Alto |
| Montero Bolivia Stake | 12 Nov 1995 | Bolivia Santa Cruz North |
| Oruro Bolivia Stake | 1 Dec 1980 | Bolivia La Paz El Alto |
| Potosí Bolivia Stake | 18 Jun 1995 | Bolivia Cochabamba South |
| Riberalta Bolivia District | 14 Sep 2002 | Bolivia Santa Cruz North |
| Santa Cruz Bolivia Abundancia Stake | 19 Jun 1994 | Bolivia Santa Cruz |
| Santa Cruz Bolivia Central Stake | 25 Jun 2017 | Bolivia Santa Cruz |
| Santa Cruz Bolivia El Bajío Stake | 1 Feb 1998 | Bolivia Santa Cruz North |
| Santa Cruz Bolivia Equipetrol Stake | 2 Dec 1990 | Bolivia Santa Cruz North |
| Santa Cruz Bolivia La Colorada Stake | 14 Jan 1979 | Bolivia Santa Cruz |
| Santa Cruz Bolivia La Libertad Stake | 14 Oct 2018 | Bolivia Santa Cruz |
| Santa Cruz Bolivia La Merced Stake | 9 Sep 2001 | Bolivia Santa Cruz |
| Santa Cruz Bolivia La Pampa Stake | 15 Oct 2006 | Bolivia Santa Cruz North |
| Santa Cruz Bolivia Paraíso Stake | 15 Feb 1981 | Bolivia Santa Cruz North |
| Santa Cruz Bolivia Viru Viru Stake | 23 Jul 2017 | Bolivia Santa Cruz North |
| Sucre Bolivia Stake | 28 Apr 1996 | Bolivia Cochabamba South |
| Tarija Bolivia Stake | 24 Mar 1996 | Bolivia Santa Cruz |
| Tarija Bolivia Tabladita Stake | 15 May 2016 | Bolivia Santa Cruz |
| Trinidad Bolivia Stake | 27 Apr 2003 | Bolivia Santa Cruz North |
| Tupiza Bolivia District | 11 Oct 1984 | Bolivia Cochabamba South |
| Yacuiba Bolivia District | 29 Oct 1995 | Bolivia Santa Cruz |

== Missions ==
| Mission | Organized |
|---|---|
| Bolivia Cochabamba North | 1 Jul 1977 |
| Bolivia Cochabamba South | June 2024 |
| Bolivia La Paz | 7 Jul 1966 |
| Bolivia La Paz El Alto | 1 Jul 2015 |
| Bolivia Santa Cruz | 1 Jul 1998 |
| Bolivia Santa Cruz North | 1 Jul 2013 |

== Temples ==
Temples in Bolivia
Red = Operating
Blue = Under Construction
Yellow = announced
Black = Closed for Renovations

| 82. Cochabamba Bolivia Temple; Official website; News & images | |
| Location: Announced: Groundbreaking: Dedicated: Size: Style: | Cochabamba, Bolivia; 13 January 1995 by Gordon B. Hinckley; 10 November 1996 by Gordon B. Hinckley; 30 April 2000 by Gordon B. Hinckley; 33,302 sq ft (3,093.9 m^{2}) on a 6.67-acre (2.70 ha) site Classic modern, single-tower design reflecting the Bolivian culture - designed by BSW and Church A&E Services |
| 246. Santa Cruz Bolivia Temple (Under construction); Official website; News & images | |
| Location: Announced: Groundbreaking: Size: | Santa Cruz, Bolivia; 4 October 2020 by Russell M. Nelson; 8 June 2024 by Jorge F. Zeballos; 29,000 sq ft (2,700 m^{2}) on a 5.24-acre (2.12 ha) site |
| 300. La Paz Bolivia Temple (Site announced); Official website; News & images | |
| Location: Announced: Size: | La Paz, Bolivia; 3 October 2021 by Russell M. Nelson; 18,850 sq ft (1,751 m^{2}) on a 3.8-acre (1.5 ha) site |

== See also ==
- Religion in Bolivia
