= The Church of Jesus Christ of Latter-day Saints in Poland =

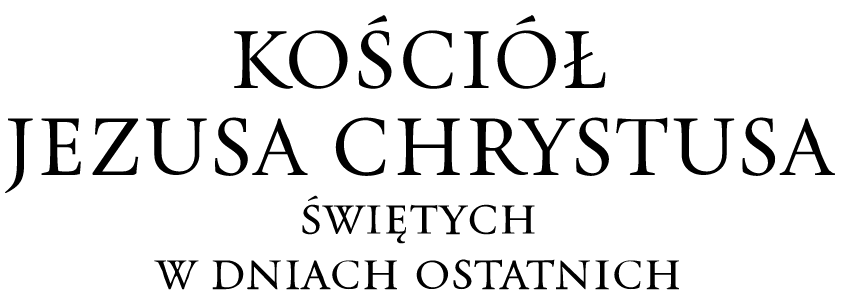
- (Logo in Polish)

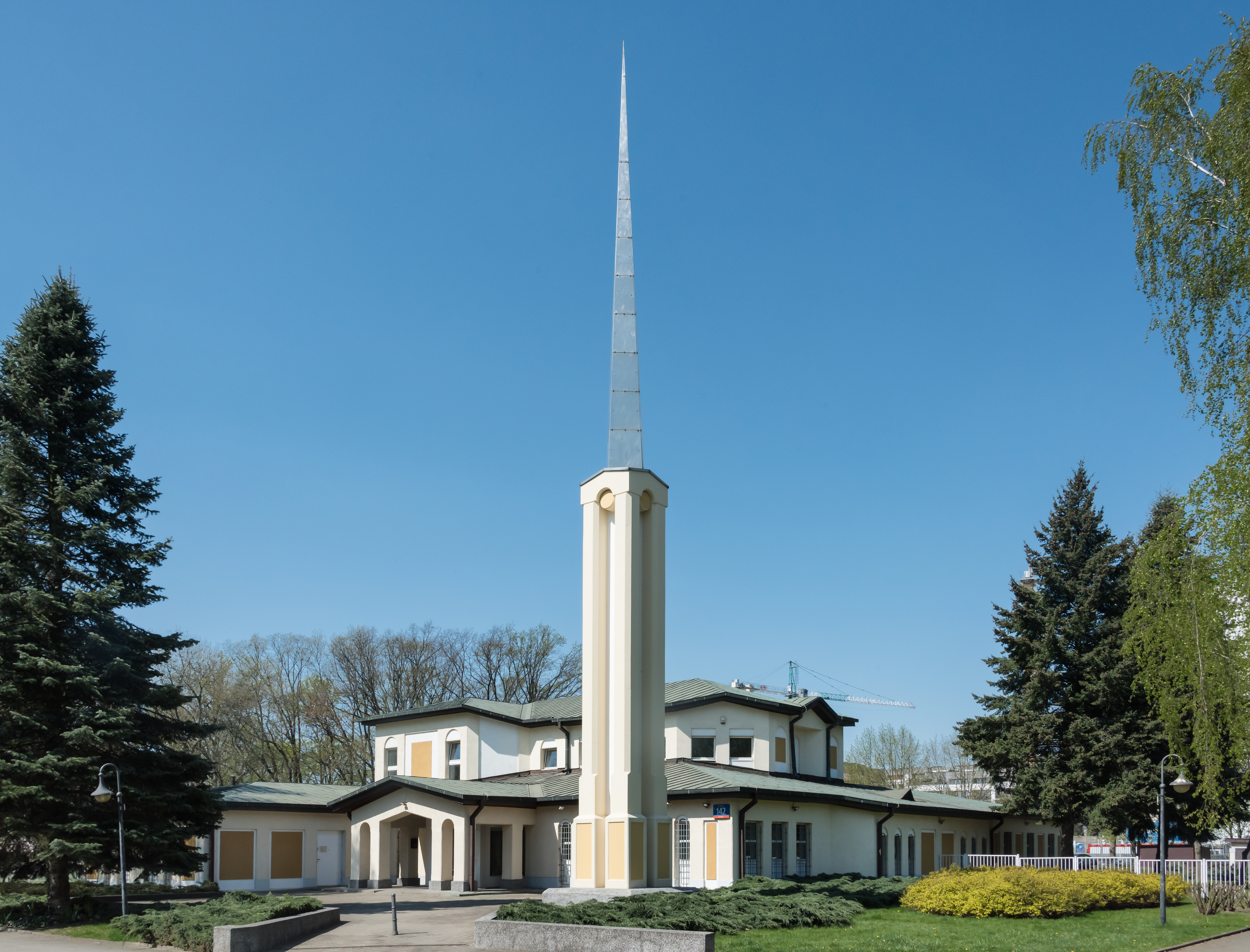
- A meetinghouse in Warsaw Poland
- Area: Europe Central
- Members: 2,315 (2025)
- Districts: 1
- Branches: 11
- Missions: 1
- FamilySearch Centers: 7

The Church of Jesus Christ of Latter-day Saints in Poland refers to the Church of Jesus Christ of Latter-day Saints (LDS Church) and its members in Poland. At year-end 1989, there were fewer than 100 members in Poland. In 2025, there were 2,315 members in 11 congregations.

== History ==
Membership in Poland
Year	Membership
1989*	<100
1999	1,094
2009	1,552
2019	2,058
2025	2,315
*Membership was published as a rounded number. Source: Wendall J. Ashton; Jim M. Wall, Deseret News, various years, Church Almanac Country Information: Poland

In 1892, the first missionaries entered and established the church in a portion of Germany that became Poland after World War II. The Wroclaw Branch was organized in 1909 and divided into three congregations by 1921. In 1929, the first LDS Church built meetinghouse was completed for the Selbongen Branch (later Zełwągi).

On May 30, 1977, the LDS Church was officially recognized by the Polish Government. Church president Spencer W. Kimball visited the country on October 24, 1977.

The Warsaw meetinghouse was constructed and dedicated on June 22, 1991. Seminary and institute classes were introduced in 1991.

The Potocki Archive was given to Polish officials by the LDS Church on December 19, 2000. In 2016, Mateusz Turek, a native of Poland, and his wife, Adrienne, were the first natives called to preside over the Poland Warsaw Mission.

== District and congregations ==
LDS Church Locations as of December 2025
Orange = District Center and meetinghouse
Purple = meetinghouse
(FHC) = Family History Center
White (FHC) = Family History Center located where there's not a meetinghouse

As of December 2025, the following congregations are located in the Poland Warsaw District which encompasses the entire country:

Warsaw Poland District

- Bydgoszcz Branch
- Gdańsk Branch
- Katowice Branch
- Kraków Branch
- Legnica Branch
- Łódź Branch
- Lublin Branch
- Poznań Branch
- Szczecin Branch
- Warszawa Branch
- Wroclaw Branch

All congregations within a district are considered branches, regardless of size.

== Missions ==
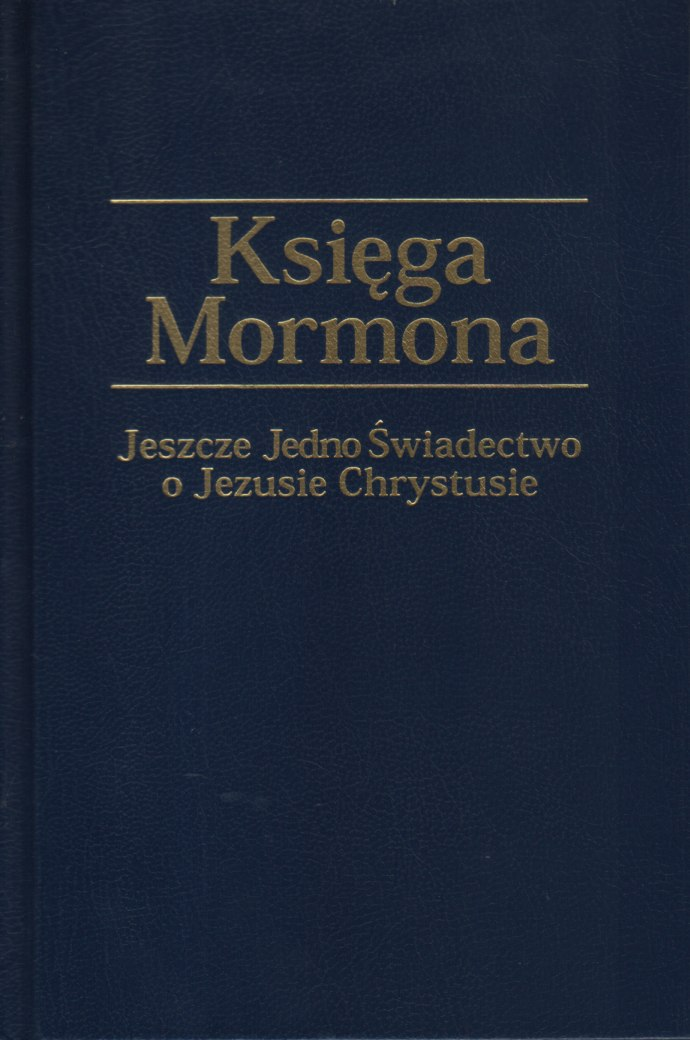
The Book of Mormon in Polish.

A number of couple missionaries served in Poland starting in 1977. In 1988, the first of the younger, proselyting missionaries arrived in Poland working out of the Austria Vienna East mission. In July 1990, the Poland Warsaw Mission was created, with Jeff Barnes and David Chandler being the first young missionaries called to serve there.

== Temples ==
As of December 2025, Poland is part of the Freiberg Germany Temple District

33. Freiberg Germany Temple; Official website; News & images	
Location: Announced: Groundbreaking: Dedicated: Rededicated: Size: Style: Notes:	Freiberg, Germany; 9 October 1982 by Spencer W. Kimball; 23 April 1983 by Thomas S. Monson; 29 June 1985 by Gordon B. Hinckley; 7 September 2002 by Gordon B. Hinckley; 21,500 sq ft (2,000 m^{2}) on a 3.58-acre (1.45 ha) site Modern, single-spire design with German influence and use of Gothic-style arches - designed by Emil B. Fetzer and Rolf Metzner; Originally without an angel Moroni statue, one was installed as part of the 2001–2002 renovations. It is the only temple ever to have been located behind the Iron Curtain.

== See also ==
- Religion in Poland
