= The Church of Jesus Christ of Latter-day Saints in Costa Rica =

- Area: Central America
- Members: 58,373 (2025)
- Stakes: 10
- Districts: 1
- Wards: 61
- Branches: 20
- Total Congregations: 81
- Missions: 2
- Temples: 1 operating
- FamilySearch Centers: 29

The Church of Jesus Christ of Latter-day Saints in Costa Rica refers to the Church of Jesus Christ of Latter-day Saints (LDS Church) and its members in Costa Rica. The first branch was organized in 1950. As of December 31, 2025, there were 58,373 members in 81 congregations in Costa Rica.

== History ==
Membership In Costa Rica
Year	Membership
1950	10
1960	214
1970	1,698
1980	4,523
1989*	13,000
1999	30,118
2009	36,666
2019	51,320
2025	58,373
1989 membership was published as a rounded number. Source: Jim M. Wall, Deseret News, various years, Church Almanac Country Information: Costa Rica, Windall J. Ashton

On July 8, 1946, Costa Rica became part of the LDS Church's Mexican Mission. The first two missionaries, Robert B. Miller and David D. Lingard, arrived in Costa Rica on September 6, 1946. They presented Costa Rican president Teodoro Picado Michalski a copy of the Book of Mormon and began preaching in the country. Due to political unrest, the missionaries left the country in 1948 and 1949. Missionaries returned in 1950 and had their first public meeting on June 7, 1950, with 70 people in attendance. The church's first branch was organized on August 25, 1950 and the property for a meetinghouse was purchased in 1951.

On June 20, 1974, the Costa Rica Mission was started. Manual Najera Guzman was president of the San Jose Costa Rica Stake, which was created on January 20, 1977. At the time of their first meeting, one month after the stake was created, there were 3,800 members.

== Stakes and District ==
As of July 2026, Costa Rica had the following stakes:

Stake/District	Organized	Mission
Alajuela Costa Rica Stake	9 Dec 1990	Costa Rica San José West
Cartago Costa Rica Stake	26 Jul 2015	Costa Rica San José East
Guápiles Costa Rica Stake	26 Jul 2015	Costa Rica San José East
Heredia Costa Rica Stake	30 Mar 2013	Costa Rica San José West
Heredia Costa Rica Belén Stake	19 Nov 2017	Costa Rica San José West
Liberia Costa Rica Stake	13 Oct 1996	Costa Rica San José West
Río Claro Costa Rica District	8 Jan 1989	Costa Rica San José East
San José Costa Rica La Paz Stake	10 Nov 1991	Costa Rica San José East
San José Costa Rica La Sabana Stake	7 May 1978	Costa Rica San José West
San José Costa Rica Los Yoses Stake	20 Jan 1977	Costa Rica San José East
San José Costa Rica Toyopán Stake	25 Apr 1999	Costa Rica San José East

== Missions ==
The Mexico Mission was the first to send missionaries to Costa Rica. On November 16, 1952, the Central American Mission was organized. It was renamed the Central America Mission on June 10, 1970, and then the Costa Rica San Jose mission on June 20, 1974, as more missions were created in Central America. On July 1, 2015, the Costa Rica San Jose West Mission was created with the Costa Rica San Jose Mission being renamed the Costa Rica San Jose East Mission.

Mission	Organized
Costa Rica San José East	16 Nov 1952
Costa Rica San José West	1 Jul 2015

== Temples ==
The San José Costa Rica Temple was dedicated on June 4, 2000 by James E. Faust.

87. San José Costa Rica Temple; Official website; News & images	
Location: Announced: Groundbreaking: Dedicated: Size: Style:	San José, Costa Rica; 17 March 1999 by Gordon B. Hinckley; 24 April 1999 by Lynn G. Robbins; 4 June 2000 by James E. Faust; 10,700 sq ft (990 m^{2}) on a 1.93-acre (0.78 ha) site Classic modern, single-spire design - designed by Álvaro Íñigo and Church A&E Services

== See also ==
- Religion in Costa Rica
