= The Church of Jesus Christ of Latter-day Saints in Jamaica =

Church in Jamaica

- Area: Caribbean
- Members: 7,856 (2025)
- Stakes: 1
- Districts: 1
- Wards: 6
- Branches: 12
- Total Congregations: 18
- Missions: 1
- FamilySearch Centers: 8

The Church of Jesus Christ of Latter-day Saints in Jamaica refers to The Church of Jesus Christ of Latter-day Saints (LDS Church) and its members in Jamaica. In 1980, there were 85 members in Jamaica. In 2025, there were 7,856 members in 18 congregations.

== History ==
Membership in Jamaica
| Year | Membership |
|---|---|
| 1980 | 85 |
| 1985 | 520 |
| 1989* | 2,100 |
| 1995* | 3,300 |
| 1999 | 4,240 |
| 2004 | 5,293 |
| 2009 | 5,906 |
| 2014 | 5,891 |
| 2019 | 6,668 |
| 2024 | 6,871 |
| 2025 | 7,856 |
*Membership was published as a rounded number. Source: Wendall J. Ashton; Jim M. Wall, Deseret News, various years, Church Almanac Country Information: Jamaica

The first native converts to the LDS Church in Jamaica was the Victor and Verna Nugent family. They were baptized on January 20, 1974. They were introduced to the church by Paul Schmiel but by 1976, the small Branch's American priesthood holders had to leave due to political unrest and economic hardships, leaving the Nugent's as the only members on the island. They held church service in their home during this time. Missionaries returned in November 1978. On December 5, 1978, Elder M. Russell Ballard dedicated the country for missionary work.

Victor Nugent, a Mandeville resident, became the country's first native Elder and first Jamaican Branch and District President. Joseph Hamilton was the first Jamaican President of the Kingston Branch in 1982. The Kingston District was organized on February 4, 1983.

Elder M. Russell Ballard visited Jamaica on December 5, 1978, and in April 1983, Thomas S. Monson visited the island. On May 15, 2002, President Gordon B. Hinckley addressed 2,000 people at a fireside in Kingston.

On June 8, 2014, Elder Jeffery R. Holland presided over a conference with 800 attendees to organize the Kingston Jamaica Stake. The Kingston Jamaica Stake was the second English-speaking stake to be organized in the Caribbean after the creation of the Spain Trinidad Stake in 2009.

On March 30, 2019, The Jamaican Red Cross awarded LDS Church in Jamaica a Humanitarian Services Award for aid provided through the LDS Charities at the JRC School of Transformation in Central Village, Spanish Town, and Clarendon.

== Stake and District ==
As of May 2025, the following stake and district was located in Jamaica:

Kingston Jamaica Stake

- Boulevard Ward
- Constant Spring Ward
- Kingston Branch
- Linstead Ward
- Old Harbour Branch
- Portmore Ward
- Spanish Town 1st Ward
- Spanish Town 2nd Ward

Mandeville Jamaica District

- Hopeton Branch
- Junction Branch
- Mandeville Branch
- May Pen Branch
- Montego Bay Branch
- Santa Cruz Branch
- Savanna-La-Mar Branch

Other Congregations The following congregations are not part of a stake or district:

- Ocho Rios Branch
- Port Antonio Branch
- Yallahs Branch

Congregations not within a stake are named branches, regardless of size.

== Mission ==
Jamaica was administered by Florida Fort Lauderdale Mission 1974 until 1983 when the West Indies Mission was created. In 1985, the Jamaica Kingston Mission was organized. This mission covers Jamaica, the Bahamas, Turks and Caicos, and the Cayman Islands.

| Country/Territory | Members | Congregations | FHC |
|---|---|---|---|
| Bahamas | 1,095 | 3 | 1 |
| Cayman Islands | 255 | 1 | 0 |
| Jamaica | 6,871 | 18 | 8 |
| Turks and Caicos (Note: 2024 membership data was not available so December 31, 2018 data (latest available) was used.) | 147 | 1 | 0 |

=== Bahamas ===
The LDS Church reported 1,125 members in three congregations in the Bahamas as of December 31, 2025. Congregations are located in Freeport and Nassau. In addition, the Jamaica Kingston Mission Branch serves individuals and families residing on the other islands. A family history center is located in the Nassau meetinghouse. Meetings are conducted in English. The Bahamas is located in the Nassau Caribbean District which covers the Bahamas, the Cayman Islands, and the Turks and Caicos Islands.

=== Turks and Caicos Islands ===
A single congregation of the LDS church is located in the Turks and Caicos Islands, and is located in the Nassau Caribbean District. The LDS Church reported 147 members in that congregation for December 31, 2018 but has not publicly reported it since. Missionaries first arrived on the island in December of 2008 and the Providenciales Branch was organized on 24 May 2009. Branch Meetings are conducted in English.

=== Cayman Islands ===
The LDS Church reported 264 members in a single congregation in the Cayman Islands as of December 31, 2025. It is located in the Nassau Caribbean District. Missionaries first arrived on the island in September 1985 after the Grand Cayman Branch was organized on 25 November 1981. The meetinghouse is located in the Grand Harbour neighborhood. Branch Meetings are conducted in English.

== Temples ==
Countries and territories within the Jamaica Kingston Mission are located in the Panama City Panama Temple District. Cuba is part of the Santo Domingo Dominican Republic Temple District.
