= The Church of Jesus Christ of Latter-day Saints in the Baltics =

Latter-day Saints movement in Baltic states

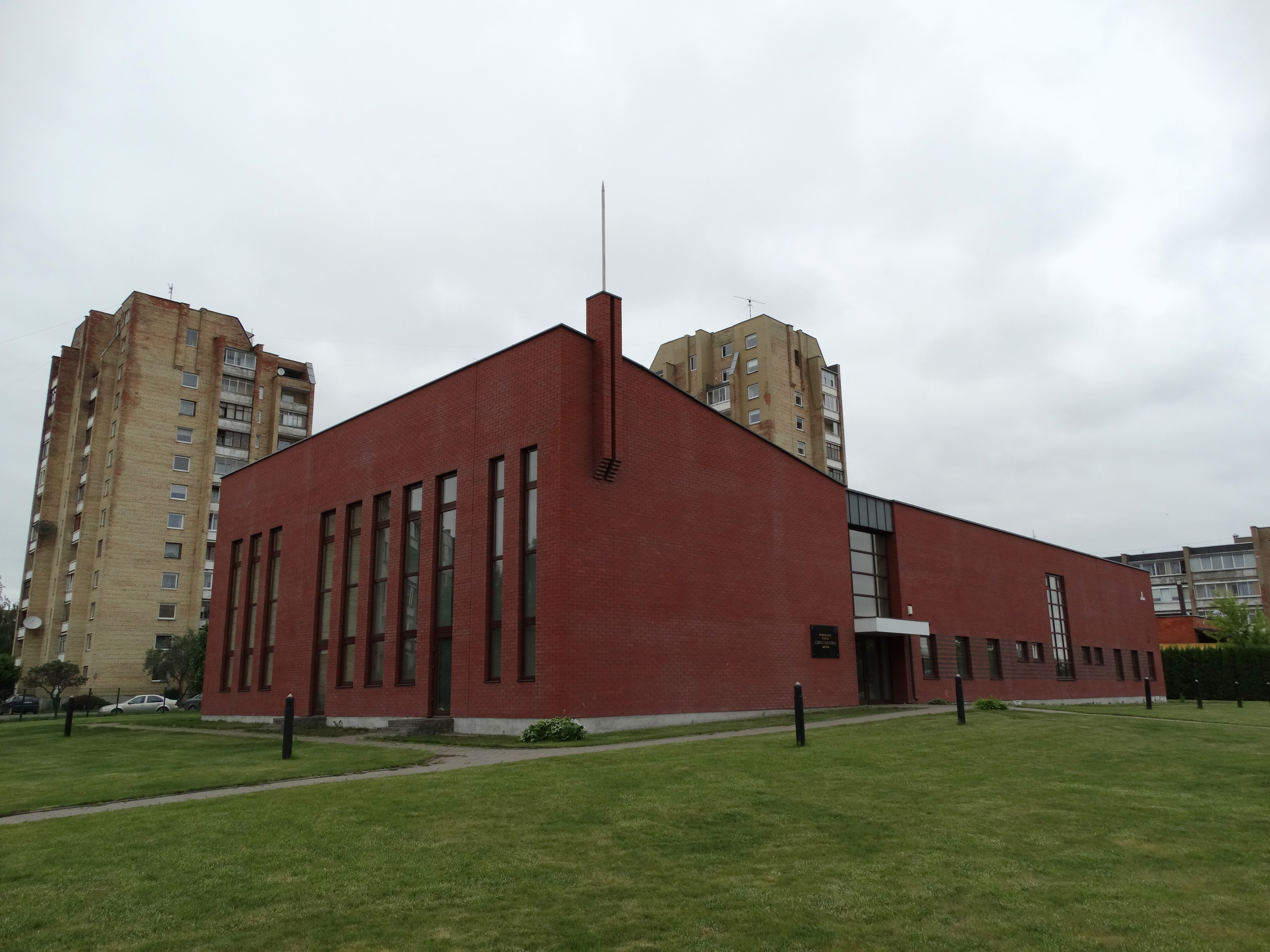
- An LDS Church meetinghouse in Kaunas, Lithuania.
- Area: Europe North
- Members: 3,454 (2025)
- Districts: 3
- Branches: 13
- Missions: 1
- FamilySearch Centers: 9

The Church of Jesus Christ of Latter-day Saints in the Baltics refers to the Church of Jesus Christ of Latter-day Saints (LDS Church) and its members in the Baltic states namely Estonia, Latvia and Lithuania. The Baltic Mission encompasses these countries. The first branch was organized in 1990. As of 2024, there were 3,348 members in 14 congregations.

== Estonia ==
As of 2025, there were 1,149 members in 4 branches in the Tallinn, Estonia District. There are two Family History Centers in Estonia.

The first known Estonian to join the LDS Church, Tiiu Pehrson, was baptized 1951 in Sweden. In the late 1980s Finnish members began to travel to Estonia. Valtteri Rotsa, a native of Tallinn, was baptized in Finland July 16, 1989 and returned to Tallinn shortly after. In 1987, a Finland Mission president had been blessed to begin work in the Baltic states and Russia, that is, during the late Soviet era. In October 1989, he sent two missionaries into Estonia. The first baptism in Estonia was of Enn Lembit which occurred December 16, 1989. By December four Estonians had been baptized and till April 1990 one hundred people else. A branch was organized in Tallinn on 28 January 1990 for Russian and Estonian speakers. This was the first branch in the former Soviet Union. The LDS Church in Estonia gained formal recognition on June 29, 1990, and was reregistered in 1994. There were nearly fifty members in Tallinn in 1990. From Estonia it went to the other Baltic countries.

Jaanus Silla of Tallinn was the first missionary called from the Soviet Union. He entered the Missionary Training Center on January 16, 1991. The Tallinn Estonia District was organized on 21 December 1997.

By 1999, the LDS Church had the largest group of foreign missionaries in Estonia. The Book of Mormon was translated into Estonian in 2000. A revised translation was published in 2011.

Tallinn Estonia District

The Tallinn Estonia District was organized on 21 December 1997. As of 2023, the district consisted of the following branches:

- Narva Branch
- Pärnu Branch
- Tallinn Branch
- Tartu Branch

== Latvia ==
As of 2025, there were 1,281 members in five branches in the Riga, Latvia District. There are three Family History Centers in Latvia.

Mischa Markow, a Hungarian member briefly preached to Germans in Latvia in October 1903 with three families requesting baptism. He then left the country after being summoned to court.

The first missionaries, Matthew H. Lyman and Michael G. Van Patten, arrived in Latvia on 17 June 1992. Two weeks later a missionary couple Boris and Liselotte Schiel arrived. Their first convert, Gunars Kavals, was baptized July 25 of the same year. Elder James E. Faust of the Quorum of the Twelve dedicated Latvia for missionary work on March 17, 1993. There were forty members in Latvia at time of his dedication.

The first branch was organized in Latvia in Riga on 15 July 1993. In October of that year, the branch was divided between Latvian and Russian speaking congregations. The Book of Mormon was translated into Latvian and delivered in February 2001. The BYU Singers performed in Riga on May 8, 2022.

Riga Latvia District

The Riga Latvia District was organized on 25 January 1998. As of 2023, the district consisted of the following branches:

- Daugavpils Branch
- Liepāja Branch
- Riga 2nd Branch (Russian)
- Riga 1st Branch

== Lithuania ==
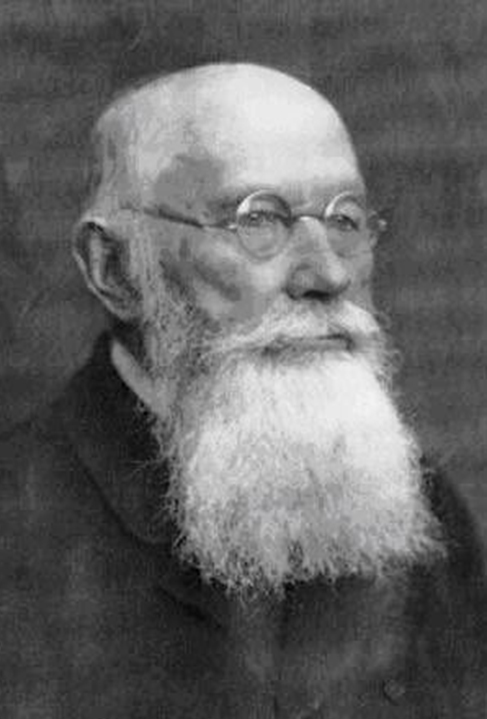
Friedrich Schulzke, a local religious leader (branch president) of The Church of Jesus Christ of Latter-day Saints in Klaipėda, Lithuania

As of 2025, there were 1,024 members in 5 branches in the Vilnius Lithuania District. There are four Family History Centers in Lithuania.

In 1907 the first missionaries arrived in what's present day Klaipėda, Lithuania (then Memel, Germany). A Branch was formed in 1909. Missionaries left during the onset of World War I, but returned in World War II. In October 1926, the branch had 36 in attendance with missionaries leaving shortly after. Being the only priesthood holder, Friedrich Schulzke was left as branch president before dying on 21 January 1937. With the onset of World War II, the church lost contact with its members in Memel.

Missionaries once again arrived on 21 December 1992 following the fall of the Soviet Union. These missionaries first spoke Russian, but learned Lithuanian the following year. On 20 May 1993, Elder M. Russell Ballard dedicated Lithuania for missionary work with twenty-seven in attendance. At the time, eight missionaries were assigned to the country. The previous year, there was only one member living in the country. By 1995, there were three branches in Lithuania and six Lithuanian members were called on missions. In 1993 and 1994, Lithuanian television presented Church-produced programs and also focused on missionaries and their work. Seminary and institute began in 1998. In January 2001, the first copies of the Lithuanian translation of the Book of Mormon was delivered.

Vilnius Lithuania District

The Vilnius Lithuania District was organized on 18 January 1998. As of 2023, the district consisted of the following branches:

- Kaunas Branch
- Klaipėda Branch
- Šiauliai Branch
- Vilnius 1st Branch
- Vilnius 2nd Branch (Russian)

== Mission ==
Finland Helsinki East which included the Baltics was organized July 1, 1990. On February 3, 1992, the mission was divided, the Baltics became part of the Russia St. Petersburg Mission. On July 1, 1993, the mission was split again and the Baltics became part of Latvia Riga Mission. At the time there was a combined 150 members in Estonia, Latvia, and Lithuania. The Latvia Riga Mission was renamed the Lithuania Vilnius Mission on April 16, 1996, and later renamed the Baltic Mission on July 1, 2002. The Baltic Mission encompasses Estonia, Latvia, and Lithuania. It had also included Belarus from 2012 until the Russian invasion of Ukraine.

== Temples ==
The Baltics is currently part of the Helsinki Finland Temple District.

| 124. Helsinki Finland Temple; Official website; News & images | |
| Location: Announced: Groundbreaking: Dedicated: Size: Style: | Espoo, Finland; 2 April 2000 by Gordon B. Hinckley; 29 March 2003 by D. Lee Tobler; 22 October 2006 by Gordon B. Hinckley; 16,350 sq ft (1,519 m^{2}) on a 7.4-acre (3.0 ha) site Classic elegance, single-spire design - designed by Evata Architects |

== See also ==
- Religion in Estonia
- Religion in Latvia
- Religion in Lithuania
