= The Church of Jesus Christ of Latter-day Saints in Pakistan =

- Area: Asia
- Members: 4,000 (2015 estimate)
- Districts: 4
- Branches: 19
- Missions: 1
- FamilySearch Centers: 1

The Church of Jesus Christ of Latter-day Saints in Pakistan refers to the Church of Jesus Christ of Latter-day Saints and its members in Pakistan. Although the church does not publish the number of its members in Pakistan, it is estimated there are roughly 4,000 members in 19 congregations in Pakistan.

== History ==
Membership in Pakistan
Year	Membership
1993	130
2000	786
2005	1,653
2010	2,750
2015	4,000
Estimated membership Source:

The first members in Pakistan were foreigners. By 1985, there were branches in Islamabad, Karachi, Rawalpindi and Lahore. The first Pakistani missionary from the Islamabad Branch began serving in January 1987.

In 1993, approximately 130 members were living in the country and there were two missionary couples, one in Karachi and the other in Lahore, serving in Pakistan. In 1995, the church was registered with the government and seminary began operating. Several members' homes and a meetinghouse were damaged by the 2005 Kashmir earthquake.

Dallin H. Oaks, of the Quorum of the Twelve Apostles, blessed and dedicated the country in August 2007 and met with members in the Pakistan District. A weekday devotional was attended by 475 people.

Selections of the Book of Mormon was first published in 1988, with the full translation completed in 2007.

On November 19, 2015, Ronald A. Rasband traveled to Islamabad where he met with members, missionaries, and a variety of civic leaders. He stated that they thanked the church for their humanitarian relief and hoped the church would become a successful minority religion in Pakistan.

=== Humanitarian efforts ===
Since 1985, the church has conducted at least 59 humanitarian and development projects in Pakistan. This includes community projects, emergency response, refugee response, and wheelchair donations. The church provided needed humanitarian aid for sufferers of the 2005 earthquake. This included 50,000 blankets, 300,000 pounds of medical supplies, 42,000 hygiene kits, and 1,000 winterized tents were initially sent. With the onset of winter, the church purchased and delivered an additional 150,000 blankets and 5,000 winterized tents in late 2005. The church shipped an estimated 400,000 pounds of food, blankets and other relief aid to Pakistan to assist flood victims after the 2010 Pakistan floods. Local members regularly engage in community projects in their cities.

== Districts and congregations ==
As of November 2025, Pakistan had the following districts and congregations:

Faisalabad Pakistan District

- Faisalabad 1st Branch
- Faisalabad 2nd Branch
- Mian Channu Branch

Islamabad Pakistan District

- Islamabad 1st Branch
- Islamabad 2nd Branch
- Islamabad 3rd Branch
- Rawalpindi 1st Branch
- Rawalpindi 2nd Branch
- Taxila Branch

Karachi Pakistan District

- Karachi 1st Branch
- Karachi 2nd Branch
- Karachi 3rd Branch
- Karachi 4th Branch

Lahore Pakistan District

- Gujranwala Branch
- Lahore 1st Branch
- Lahore 2nd Branch
- Lahore 3rd Branch
- Sialkot 1st Branch
- Sialkot 2nd Branch

Congregations in a district are called branches, regardless of size. A church Family History Center is located in Lahore.

== Missions ==
Pakistan was originally part of the church's Singapore Mission when missionaries arrived in the 1990s. On November 1, 2007, the India New Delhi Mission was organized, which included Northern India, Bangladesh, Bhutan, Nepal, and Pakistan. On November 7, 2010, the Pakistan Service Mission, headquartered in Islamabad, was created. In 2011, there were about 30 Pakistani members serving full-time on missions worldwide — with about 20 of them serving in their own country (constituting the nation's church's entire missionary force). Unlike most countries, these missionaries do not openly proselytize. Instead, missionary work occurs through member referrals.

== Temples ==
The church does not have any temples in Pakistan. Pakistan was part of the Hong Kong China Temple district until the completion of the Bangkok Thailand Temple in 2023. The Bengaluru India Temple is under construction, and on April 5, 2020, the Dubai United Arab Emirates Temple was announced by church president Russell M. Nelson. Because of proximity and less rigid visa restrictions and proximity to the airport and transit system, the Dubai United Arab Emirates Temple is expected to make it easier for Pakistani members to access a church temple.

== See also ==
- Religion in Pakistan
