= The Church of Jesus Christ of Latter-day Saints in Mozambique =

- Area: Africa South
- Members: 39,282 (2025)
- Stakes: 10
- Districts: 3
- Wards: 59
- Branches: 31
- Total congregations: 90
- Missions: 2
- Temples: 2 announced
- FamilySearch Centers: 18

The Church of Jesus Christ of Latter-day Saints in Mozambique refers to the Church of Jesus Christ of Latter-day Saints and its members in Mozambique.

== History ==
Membership in Mozambique
Year	Membership
1997*	200
1999	311
2004	2,951
2009	5,079
2014	7,943
2019	15,032
2024	31,633
2025	39,282
*Membership was published as a rounded number.

In 1982, Chico Mapenda, who was 13 years old at the time, left Mozambique to study in the German Democratic Republic. In 1989, he came across missionaries there and was baptized on January 14, 1990. Upon the reunification of East and West Germany, he returned to Mozambique. Upon return to Mozambique in 1990, he shared his new beliefs with his family and friends and held meetings with groups of up to 150 people.

In February 1996, the LDS Church received legal recognition. In June 1996, Elder Earl C. Tingey of the Seventy visited Beira, organized the Beira group, and authorized the first baptisms in the country. On January 30, 1999, the Beira Branch was organized. On October 19, 1999, Mozambique was dedicated for the preaching of the gospel. About 650 attended the creation of the Beira Mozambique District on April 13, 2003.

In 2003, there were nine branches in the country. On February 15, 2015, the Maputo Mozambique Stake (Mozambique's first) was created.

== Stakes & Districts ==
Green = Stake
Orange = District

As of October 2026, Mozambique had the following stakes and districts:

Stake	Organized	Mission
Beira Mozambique Aeroporto Stake	30 Nov 2025	Mozambique Beira
Beira Mozambique Chamba Stake	15 Mar 2026	Mozambique Beira
Beira Mozambique Inhamízua Stake	16 Jun 2024	Mozambique Beira
Beira Mozambique Manga Stake	19 Mar 2017	Mozambique Beira
Beira Mozambique Munhava Stake	14 May 2023	Mozambique Beira
Beira Mozambique Stake	22 Mar 2015	Mozambique Beira
Chimoio Mozambique Stake	23 Nov 2025	Mozambique Beira
Dondo Mozambique Stake	20 Sep 2026	Mozambique Beira
Maputo Mozambique Stake	15 Feb 2015	Mozambique Maputo
Maputo Mozambique Magoanine Stake	31 May 2026	Mozambique Maputo
Maputo Mozambique Matola Stake	22 Sep 2019	Mozambique Maputo
Maputo Mozambique Zimpeto Stake	19 Nov 2023	Mozambique Maputo
Marromeu Mozambique District	11 Oct 2026	Mozambique Beira
Maxixe Mozambique District	12 Nov 2023	Mozambique Maputo
Nampula Mozambique Stake	31 Jan 2021	Mozambique Nampula
Nampula Mozambique Mutauanha Stake	15 Mar 2026	Mozambique Nampula
Quelimane Mozambique District	12 Apr 2026	Mozambique Nampula
Tete Mozambique District	17 Aug 2025	Mozambique Beira
Xai-Xai Mozambique District	14 Dec 2025	Mozambique Maputo

== Missions ==
Mission	Organized
Mozambique Beira Mission	13 Aug 2021
Mozambique Maputo Mission	20 Dec 2004
Mozambique Nampula Mission	1 Jul 2026

== Temples ==
Central and northern portions of the country is currently in the Harare Zimbabwe Temple District, while the southern portion is in the Durban South Africa Temple District. On April 4, 2021, the intent to construct the Beira Mozambique Temple was announced by church president Russell M. Nelson.

305. Beira Mozambique Temple (Site announced); Official website; News & images	
Location: Announced: Size:	Beira, Mozambique; 4 April 2021 by Russell M. Nelson; 10,000 sq ft (930 m^{2}) on a 2.5-acre (1.0 ha) site
362. Maputo Mozambique Temple (Announced); Official website; News & images	
Location: Announced:	Maputo, Mozambique; 6 October 2024 by Russell M. Nelson

== See also ==
- Religion in Mozambique
