= The Church of Jesus Christ of Latter-day Saints in Ivory Coast =

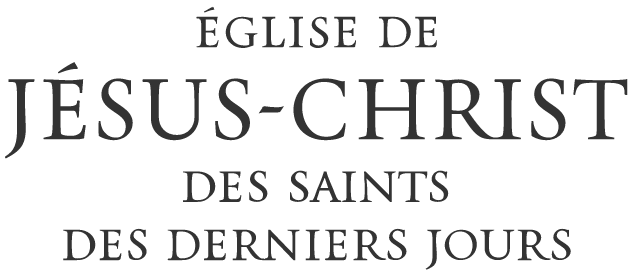
- (Logo in French)
- Area: Africa West
- Members: 71,182 (2025)
- Stakes: 23
- Districts: 9
- Wards: 174
- Branches: 100
- Total congregations: 274
- Missions: 6
- Temples: 1 operating
- FamilySearch Centers: 57

The Church of Jesus Christ of Latter-day Saints in Ivory Coast refers to the Church of Jesus Christ of Latter-day Saints (LDS Church) and its members in Ivory Coast. At year-end 1989, there were fewer than 200 members in Ivory Coast. In 2025, there were 71,182 members in 274 congregations.

== History ==
Membership in Ivory Coast
Year	Membership
1989*	200
1995*	2,800
1999	5,402
2004	9,345
2009	13,245
2014	27,052
2019	52,241
2024	66,399
2025	71,182
*Membership was published as a rounded number.

Mormon missionaries first preached in Ivory Coast in 1988. Earlier the Church of Jesus Christ of Latter-day Saints had been established by Philippe and Annelies Assard and Lucien and Agathe Affoue. The Affoue family joined the church while studying in France. Philippe Assard joined the Church while studying in Germany, where he married Annelies who was a native of Germany. After they returned to Ivroy Coast in the mid-1980s they got in contact with each other and began holding Church meetings.

The first LDS stake was organized in the late 1990s. During the civil war in the 2000s the number of missionaries in the country was reduced and some areas saw missionaries withdrawn. As of 2018 most full-time LDS missionaries in the country were from either the Congo or countries in West Africa, but there were a very few from other areas.

Plans to build a temple of The Church of Jesus Christ of Latter-day Saints in Abidjan were announced in 2015. As of 2018 the country had three LDS missions, although two of them also covered Church operations in Senegal and Mali.

== Stakes and Districts ==
Stake/District	Organized	Mission
Abengourou Cote d'Ivoire District	30 Oct 2016	Cote d'Ivoire Abidjan North
Abidjan Cote d'Ivoire Niangon Central Stake	3 Dec 2017	Cote d'Ivoire Abidjan West
Abidjan Cote d'Ivoire Niangon North Stake	7 Feb 2010	Cote d'Ivoire Abidjan West
Abidjan Cote d'Ivoire Niangon South Stake	1 Jun 2014	Cote d'Ivoire Abidjan West
Abidjan Cote d'Ivoire Selmer Stake	1 Mar 2020	Cote d'Ivoire Abidjan West
Abidjan Cote d'Ivoire Toit Rouge Stake	17 Aug 1997	Cote d'Ivoire Abidjan West
Abidjan Cote d'Ivoire Yopougon Attie Stake	6 Sep 2015	Cote d'Ivoire Abidjan West
Abobo Cote d'Ivoire East Stake	9 Nov 2014	Cote d'Ivoire Abidjan East
Abobo Cote d'Ivoire West Stake	27 Aug 2000	Cote d'Ivoire Abidjan North
Aboisso Cote d'Ivoire District	14 Feb 2016	Cote d'Ivoire Abidjan East
Adzope Cote d'Ivoire Stake	2 Feb 2025	Cote d'Ivoire Abidjan North
Alepe Cote d'Ivoire District	14 May 2017	Cote d'Ivoire Abidjan East
Anonkoua Cote d'Ivoire Stake	10 Sep 2017	Cote d'Ivoire Abidjan North
Bouafle Cote d'Ivoire Stake	24 May 2026	Cote d'Ivoire Yamoussoukro
Bouake Cote d'Ivoire Stake	20 Aug 2023	Cote d'Ivoire Yamoussoukro
Cocody Cote d'Ivoire Stake	20 Aug 2006	Cote d'Ivoire Abidjan East
Dabou Cote d'Ivoire District	30 Oct 2024	Cote d’Ivoire Abidjan West
Daloa Cote d'Ivoire Stake	22 Oct 2017	Cote d'Ivoire Daloa
Dokui Cote d'Ivoire Stake	11 Sep 2016	Cote d'Ivoire Abidjan East
Duekoue Cote d'Ivoire District	24 Feb 2019	Cote d'Ivoire Daloa
Ebimpé Cote d'Ivoire Stake	16 Mar 2025	Cote d'Ivoire Abidjan North
Gagnoa Cote d'Ivoire Stake	19 Jun 2022	Cote d'Ivoire Yamoussoukro
Grand-Bassam Cote d'Ivoire Stake	12 Jun 2016	Cote d'Ivoire Abidjan South
Issia Cote d'Ivoire District	21 Jul 2019	Cote d'Ivoire Daloa
Koumassi Cote d'Ivoire Stake	15 Nov 2020	Cote d'Ivoire Abidjan South
Man Cote d'Ivoire Stake	15 Oct 2023	Cote d'Ivoire Daloa
Port-Bouet Cote d'Ivoire Stake	23 Sep 2012	Cote d'Ivoire Abidjan South
Quatre Etages Cote d'Ivoire Stake	29 May 2022	Cote d'Ivoire Abidjan East
San Pedro Cote d'Ivoire Stake	22 Sep 2024	Cote d'Ivoire Daloa
Tiassale Cote d'Ivoire District	14 Dec 2025	Cote d'Ivoire Abidjan West
Yamoussoukro Cote d'Ivoire Stake	12 Apr 2015	Cote d'Ivoire Yamoussoukro

== Missions ==
The Côte d'Ivoire Abidjan North Mission was created in July 2023 by dividing the east mission and adjoining portions of the west mission.

Mission	Organized
Côte d'Ivoire Abidjan East Mission	1 Jul 1992
Côte d'Ivoire Abidjan North Mission	1 Jul 2023
Côte d'Ivoire Abidjan South Mission	1 Jul 2026
Côte d'Ivoire Abidjan West Mission	1 Jul 2014
Côte d'Ivoire Daloa Mission	1 Jul 2026
Côte d'Ivoire Yamoussoukro Mission	28 Jun 2018

=== Guinea ===
The Conakry Branch was created on June 18, 2017. Initially it became part of the Sierra Leone Freetown Mission but later came under the Côte d'Ivoire Yamoussoukro Mission. An estimated 300 members living in Guinea in 2023. As of November 2025, there were three branches that make up the Conakry Guinea District, namely Conakry 1st Branch, Conakry 2nd Branch, and Coyah Branch. The Africa West Area Branch serves individuals and families outside the Conakry metro who are not in proximity to a meetinghouse.

=== Mali ===
Mali has a single congregation, the Bamako Branch, which was created on July 9, 2017. The LDS Church was granted official status in January 2019. The LDS Church reported 50 Latter-day Saint families in Mali that same year and recognition allows missionaries in the country. The branch is administered by the Cote d'Ivoire Abidjan East Mission as of August 2024, and membership for the country was estimated to be 123 in 2023.

=== Senegal ===
The Church of Jesus Christ of Latter-day Saints in Senegal
- Area: Africa West
- Members: 338 (2025)
- Districts: 1
- Branches: 5

Membership in Senegal
Year	Membership
2009*	13
2014	15
2019	133
2023*	257
2025	338
*Estimated

In 2016, the first missionaries, humanitarian service missionaries, arrived in Senegal, and on February 20, 2018, the LDS Church received official recognition from the Government. On February 13, 2022, the Dakar Senegal District was created with three branches in the Dakar Area (Dakar, Ouakam, Parcelles) as well as a branch in Saint-Louis. Senegal is assigned to the Côte d'Ivoire Abidjan West Mission. As of 2023, there was 257 members in Senegal. On October 24, 2025, the LDS Church announced the Senegal Dakar Mission would be created in July 2026. In July 2026, the Senegal Dakar Mission was created. This mission encompasses Burkina Faso, Guinea, Mali, Mauritania, Niger, Senegal, The Gambia, and Western Sahara.

As of May 2026, the following congregations existed in Senegal

- Dakar Branch
- Keur Massar Branch
- Ouakam Branch
- Parcelles Branch
- Saint-Louis Branch
- Saly Branch
- Cote d'Ivoire Abidjan West Dispersed Members Unit. The Cote d'Ivoire Abidjan West Dispersed Members Unit serves members and families not in proximity to a meetinghouse. The remaining branches are part of the Dakar Senegal District.

=== The Gambia ===
On February 23, 2022, Elder D. Todd Christofferson along with other Church leaders dedicated the Gambia for the Church's preaching. On June 10, 2022, the Banjul Branch was created. The branch at that time consisted of 26 members and two full-time missionaries from the Cote d'Ivoire Abidjan West Mission. On October 27, 2024, a second branch was created with more than 100 members in the country and the first branch was renamed. As of November 2025, the LDS Church reported two congregations along the Gambia West Coast, namely Brusubi Branch and Kanifing Branch with the Cote d'Ivoire Abidjan West Dispersed Members Unit serving individuals and families in the rest of the country.

== Temples ==
Plans to build a temple of The Church of Jesus Christ of Latter-day Saints in Abidjan were announced in 2015. On Nov. 8, 2018 Elder Neil L. Andersen of the Quorum of the 12 of The Church of Jesus Christ of Latter-day Saints presided at the ground breaking for the Abidjan Ivory Coast Temple. Andersen both spoke and gave the dedicatory prayer in French. During his remarks Anderson shared testimonies of the restored gospel from the Assard family.

205. Abidjan Ivory Coast Temple; Official website; News & images	
Location: Announced: Groundbreaking: Dedicated: Size:	Abidjan, Ivory Coast; 5 April 2015 by Thomas S. Monson; 8 November 2018 by Neil L. Andersen; 25 May 2025 by Ronald A. Rasband; 17,362 sq ft (1,613.0 m^{2}) on a 3.23-acre (1.31 ha) site

== See also ==
- Christianity in Ivory Coast
