= The Church of Jesus Christ of Latter-day Saints in Austria =

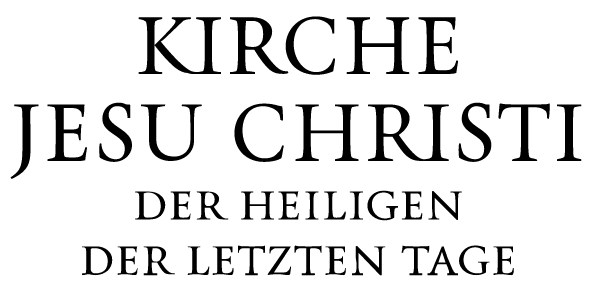
- (Logo in German)

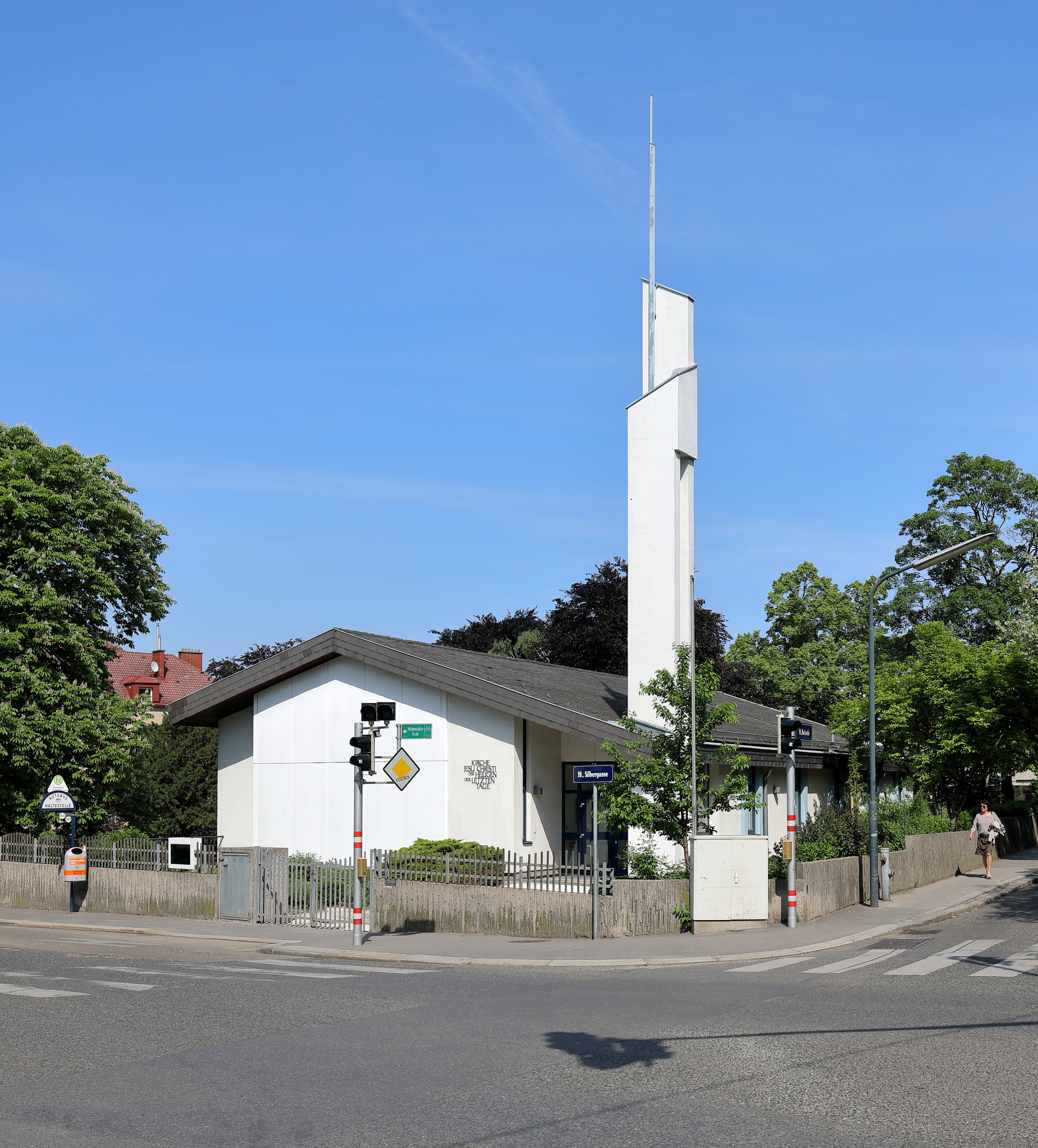
- A meetinghouse for the Vienna 1st Ward
- Area: Europe Central
- Members: 4,753 (2025)
- Stakes: 2
- Wards: 14
- Branches: 3
- Total congregations: 17
- Temples: 1 announced
- FamilySearch Centers: 12

The Church of Jesus Christ of Latter-day Saints in Austria refers to the Church of Jesus Christ of Latter-day Saints (LDS Church) and its members in Austria. The greatest growth of the church in Austria occurred during the 1960s. This growth has since slowed. In 2025, there were 4,753 members in 17 congregations (14 wards and 3 branches). Nationwide active membership is likely between 1,600 and 1,800, or 35-38% of total membership.

== History ==
Membership in Austria
Year	Membership
1930	259
1940	200
1950	326
1960	632
1970	2,691
1979	3,010
1989*	3,500
1999	3,889
2009	4,203
2019	4,693
2025	4,753
*Membership was published as a rounded number. Source: Wendall J. Ashton; Jim M. Wall, Deseret News, various years, Church Almanac Country Information: Austria

Prior to World War I, the LDS Church had difficulties establishing itself in Austria due to existing laws. Even with that, the first Latter-day Saint visit to Austria was Orson Hyde in 1842, who briefly passed through on his way to Palestine. The first missionaries arrived in 1865 but were banished later that year. The first Austrian convert was Joseph A. Oheim who was baptized in Munich, Germany on January 22, 1870. The first convert baptized in Austria was Paul Haslinger who was baptized on November 25, 1883. The first branch was established in Haag am Hausruck in 1902. In 1909, a second congregation was formed in Vienna but was closed by Police in 1914.

The LDS Church enjoyed religious freedom following World War I. The first district in Austria was formed in 1920 with the district leadership centered in Vienna and encompassed other cities such as Linz and Salzburg. During World War II, missionaries and some local members left Austria. After World War II, the church provided humanitarian aid programs in Austria and other European countries under direction of Ezra Taft Benson. On September 27, 1955, Austria granted official recognition of the LDS Church.

The Vienna Austria Stake was organized on April 20 1980, and another stake in Salzburg was organized on January 19, 1997.

== Stakes and congregations ==
Stake Centers in Austria

As of September 2026, the following stakes exist in Austria:

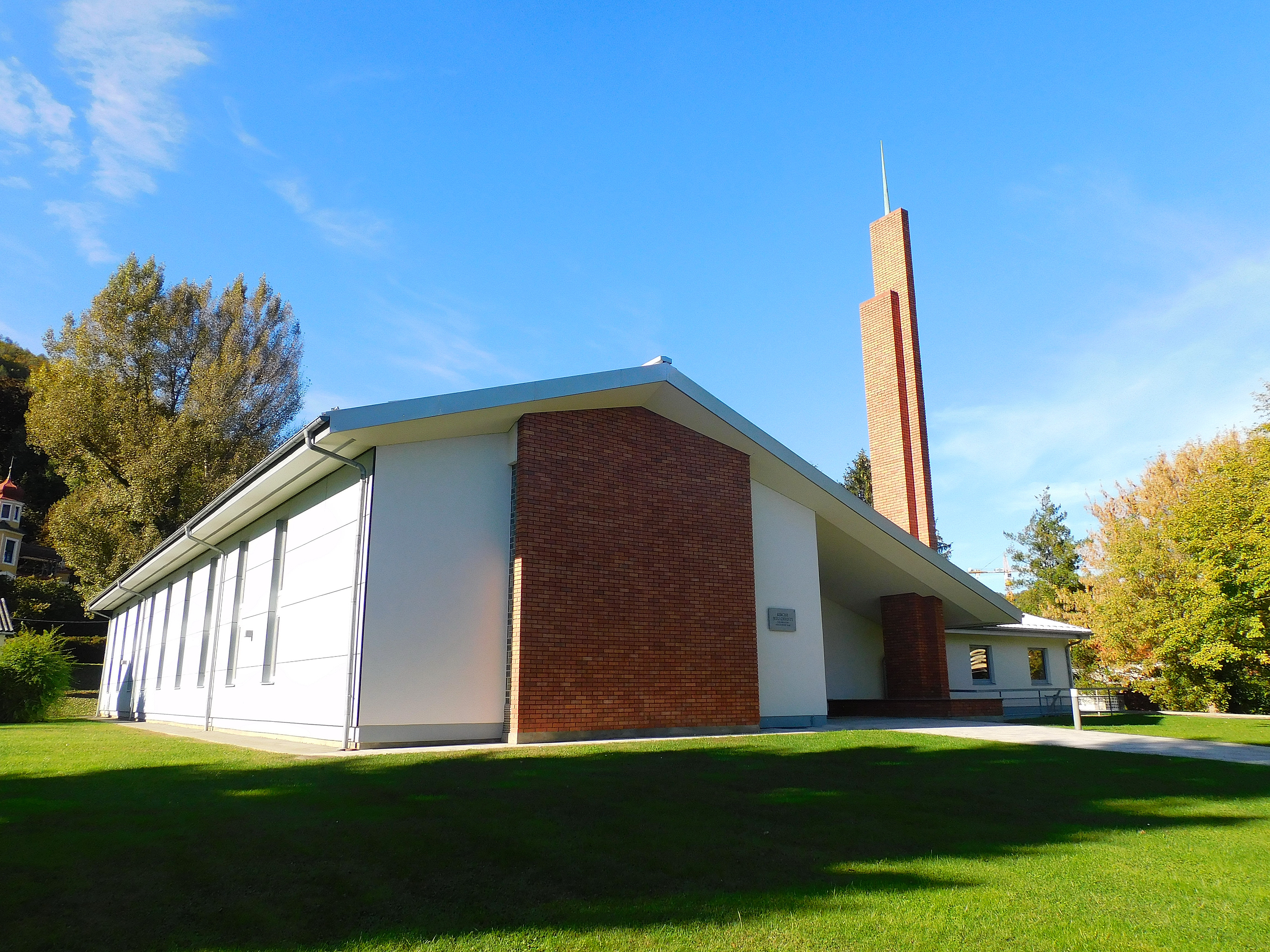
A meetinghouse in Graz

Salzburg Austria Stake

- Enns Ward
- Haag am Hausruck Branch
- Innsbruck Ward
- Klagenfurt Ward
- Linz Ward
- Neumarkt am Wallersee Ward
- Salzburg Ward
- Wels Ward

Vienna Austria Stake

- Bruck an der Mur Branch
- Döbling Ward (English)
- Gerasdorf Ward
- Graz Ward
- Leopoldstadt Ward
- Liesing Ward
- St Pölten Branch
- Wiener Neustadt Ward

== Missions ==
Austria is currently part of the church's Alpine German-Speaking Mission. This mission encompasses Austria, Liechtenstein, and portions of Germany & Switzerland.

== Temples ==
On April 4, 2021, the intent to construct the Vienna Austria Temple was announced by church president Russell M. Nelson.

291. Vienna Austria Temple (Groundbreaking scheduled); Official website; News & images	
Location: Announced: Groundbreaking: Size:	Vienna, Austria; 4 April 2021 by Russell M. Nelson scheduled for 17 October 2026 by Michael Cziesla; 15,300 sq ft (1,420 m^{2}) on a 0.8-acre (0.32 ha) site

== See also ==
- Religion in Austria
