= Managua Nicaragua Temple =

LDS Church temple in Managua, Nicaragua

- Interactive map of Managua Nicaragua Temple
- Number: 225
- Dedication: 18 October 2026, by Ronald A. Rasband
- Site: 8.9 acres (3.6 ha)
- Floor area: 24,500 ft^{2} (2,280 m^{2})
- Official website • News & images

Church chronology
← Montpelier Idaho Temple	Managua Nicaragua Temple	→ Cody Wyoming Temple

Additional information
- Announced: 1 April 2018, by Russell M. Nelson
- Groundbreaking: 26 November 2022, by Taylor G. Godoy
- Open house: 10-26 September 2026
- Current president: Johnny Cristobal Andino
- Location: Managua, Nicaragua
- Coordinates: 12°05′27″N 86°14′01″W
- Baptistries: 1
- Ordinance rooms: 2
- Sealing rooms: 2

The Managua Nicaragua Temple is a temple of the Church of Jesus Christ of Latter-day Saints in Managua, Nicaragua. It is the church's first temple in Nicaragua and the 7th in Central America.

The intent to construct the temple was announced by church president Russell M. Nelson during the April 2018 general conference, along with six others. A groundbreaking took place four and a half years later, with Taylor G. Godoy, a church general authority, presiding at the event. Reyna Rueda, the mayor of Managua, was also in attendance. The dedication, by Ronald A. Rasband of the Quorum of the Twelve Apostles, took place on October 18, 2026.

The temple is located on a 8.9-acre site in southeast Managua, near residential Las Colinas. The exterior has a white finish, and the building is around 25,000 square feet.

== History ==
The church has had a presence in Nicaragua since 1953, with missionaries arriving in December. The first branch was organized in November 1954, with the first district organized in 1959. The church’s missionaries left Nicaragua in 1978, a year before the Nicaraguan Revolution, and returned in the late 1980s. Church membership reached around 3,500 by the time the Nicaragua Managua Mission was organized in October 1989, growing to around 8,000 by 1990. The church lost all of its property in Nicaragua in the 1980s.

The temple was announced by Russell M. Nelson during the April 2018 general conference, along with six others.These temples were some of the first announced by Nelson after he became president of the church in early 2018. In 2018, missionaries were moved out of the country due to growing instability, with 47 missionaries returning home, and 112 assigned elsewhere.

The groundbreaking of the temple took place on November 26, 2022, four and a half years after the announcement. Taylor G. Godoy, a general authority, and first counselor in the presidency of the church's Central America Area, presided at the event. Renya Rueda, the mayor of Managua, also attended. After the ceremony, earthmoving work began on where the temple would be built. In December 2023, Rueda highlighted the importance of the temple for the city’s urban development, along with giving governmental support for various religious denominations.

This is the church's first temple in Nicaragua. As of 2026, the church reports around 107,000 members in Nicaragua, across more than 100 congregations.

The dedication took place on October 18, 2026, the same day as the Montpelier Idaho Temple. Ronald A. Rasband of the Quorum of the Twelve Apostles performed the dedication. Johnny Delgado and Lucia Andino are the temple's first president and matron.

== Architecture and temple grounds ==
The temple is located on a 8.9-acre site in southeast Managua. It is located along a highway, Carretera Masaya, near residential Las Colinas. The building is around 25,000 square feet.

The exterior has a single spire with a white finish. The front facade has three arches and eight windows, along with the main entrance. The grounds include walkways, perennial shrubs, palm trees, flowers, and a fountain.

== See also ==
- Comparison of temples (LDS Church)
- List of temples (LDS Church)
- List of temples by geographic region (LDS Church)
- Temple architecture (LDS Church)
