= Area (LDS Church) =

Administrative unit of The Church of Jesus Christ of Latter-day Saints

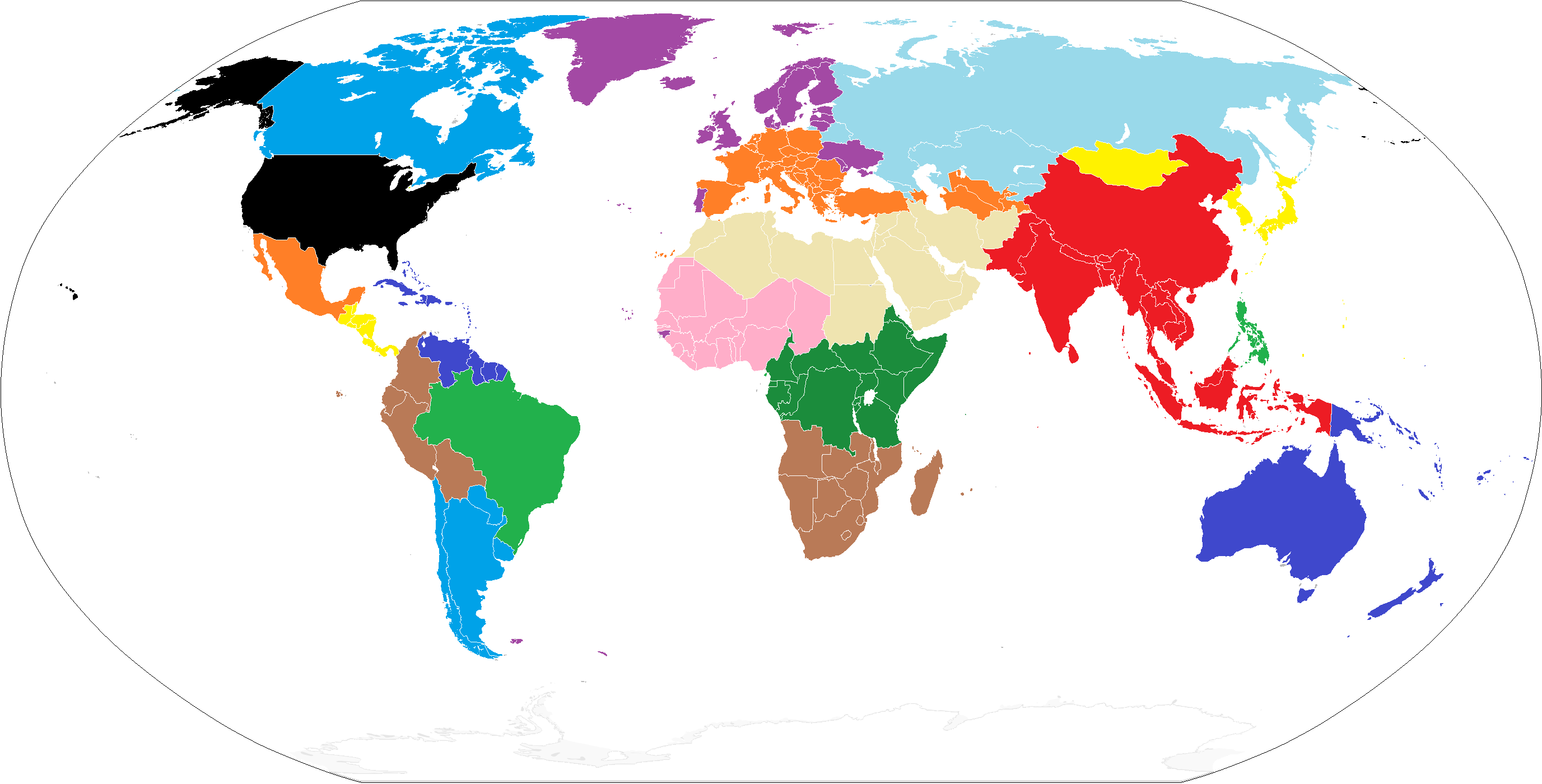

Areas of the Church of Jesus Christ of Latter-day Saints outside US and Canada.

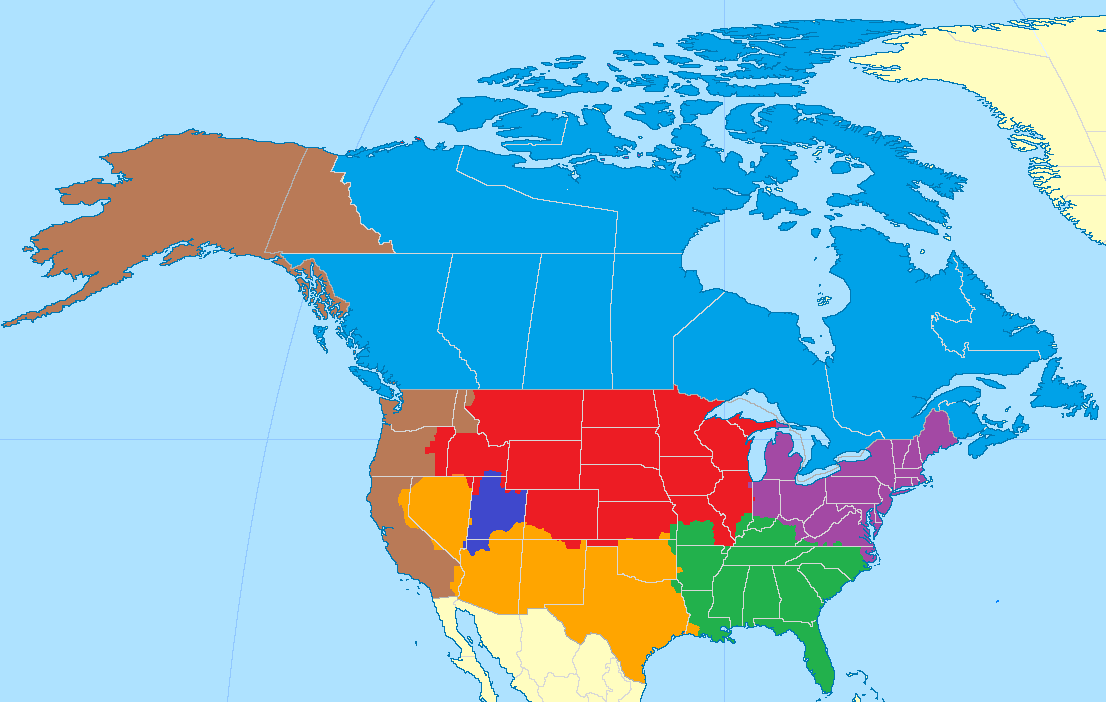
Areas of the Church of Jesus Christ of Latter-day Saints in US and
Canada.

In the Church of Jesus Christ of Latter-day Saints (LDS Church), an area is an administrative unit that typically is composed of multiple stakes and missions. These areas are the primary church administrative unit between individual stakes or missions and the church as a whole.

== History ==
The areas as they now exist were formed in January 1984. Prior to that time, general authorities served as "area supervisors" and at times resided outside of Salt Lake City. In 1984, 13 initial areas were created; by 1992 there were 22, and by early 2007 there were 31. As of August 2025, there are 24 areas, 6 in the United States, and 18 worldwide, including the new Canada Area. In conjunction with the move to create a Canada Area, five of the other six North American areas were renamed. The former North America Central, North America Northeast, North America Southeast, North America Southwest, and North America West Areas, respectively are now known as the United States Central, United States Northeast, United States Southeast, United States Southwest, and United States West Areas, respectively.

== Administration ==
Until 2003, each area had a president and two counselors, all of whom were typically general authorities (area seventies sometimes served as counselors). This three-man body was known as the area presidency. In that year, the church eliminated these presidencies for areas located in the United States and Canada, which were all then placed under the direct supervision of a member of the Presidency of the Seventy, thus freeing more general authorities from specific area assignments. Since these areas were previously administered by area presidencies located at church headquarters in Salt Lake City, the administrative change was not as drastic as it might seem.

In April 2018, the church announced that, effective August 1 of that year, areas in the United States and Canada would once again be supervised by a three-man presidency. This enabled the Presidency of the Seventy to more fully assist the Quorum of the Twelve Apostles in their duties, and to fill other assignments as needed.

The areas outside the United States continue to be governed by area presidencies that are typically composed of general authority seventies and/or area seventies. These presidency members usually reside in a headquarters city located in the geographic boundaries of the area. Area seventies who serve in these presidencies reside in their own homes, which may or may not be in the area headquarters city.

In 2019, church leaders stated that the 10 North American areas would be merged into six (the Idaho Area merged into the North America Central Area; the North America Northwest Area merged into the North America West Area; and the Utah North, Utah Salt Lake City, and Utah South areas merged into a single Utah Area.

Also in 2019, a structural change occurred in the administration of the Middle East/Africa North Area. In prior years, two general authorities based at church headquarters were assigned oversight for the area. However, beginning in August 2019, a three-man area presidency was established to oversee the area. Two of them were general authorities at church headquarters, while the second counselor was an area seventy living in the area.

In 2019, church leaders also announced the division of the Africa Southeast Area, into the Africa Central and Africa South areas, effective August 1, 2020. Two months later, W. Christopher Waddell, second counselor in the Presiding Bishopric, announced in Johannesburg that the new Africa Central Area would be headquartered in Nairobi, Kenya.

Then in 2022, additional structural changes affected Europe. The Europe and Europe East areas were split into 3 areas and renamed the Europe Central, Europe East, and Europe North areas. The presidency of the Europe Area became the presidency of the Europe Central Area, with the presidency of the Europe East Area becoming three area seventies. The president and first counselor in the Europe East Area were reassigned to fill the same roles in the Europe North Area, with the second counselor being an area seventy. The area seventy who had been serving as the second counselor in the Europe East Area was designated an assistant to the Europe North Area presidency, specifically overseeing Ukraine and Moldova, which will be separate from a specific area at the current time.

Then, in early December 2024, the First Presidency created a new Canada Area. Subsequently, in mid-April 2025, in conjunction with the announcement of the first Canada Area presidency, it was announced that the area headquarters would be in Calgary, Alberta, with some area functions managed in Toronto, Ontario.

As of August 2025, the church has 18 areas outside and 6 areas inside the United States, for a total of 24 areas. With the changes in the Europe Areas, the church now has five area seventies serving in area presidencies. Area assignments are generally announced sometime after April's general conference and are effective August 1.

== Summary statistics ==
Area	Members	Stakes	Districts	Congregations	Missions	Temples			
Area	Members	Stakes	Districts	Congregations	Missions	O	U	A	T
Africa Central	244,714	59	34	744	15	2	2	3	7
Africa South	228,689	51	27	585	13	3	2	3	8
Africa West	587,338	163	42	1,909	25	3	4	6	13
Asia (Note: Estimates or latest available data were used for countries without released membership and congregational statistics. A significant number of countries in the Middle East/North Africa and Asia Areas don't have any official church membership and congregational data and therefore are more reliant on these estimates.)	184,927	33	23	335	13	3	4	2	9
Asia North	244,637	38	16	381	12	6	0	3	9
Brazil	1,573,360	289	34	2,008	37	11	6	7	24
Canada	211,581	56	3	501	6	9	1	1	11
Caribbean	419,711	67	26	618	14	4	0	2	6
Central America	861,618	133	24	1,119	19	8	3	2	13
Eurasian	22,628	2	5	66	4	0	0	1	1
Europe Central	239,951	66	9	697	20	7	1	5	13
Europe North	301,924	67	9	590	16	8	1	4	13
Middle East/ Africa North	3,424	2	3	22	0	0	0	1	1
Mexico	1,572,287	231	42	1,875	34	14	3	10	27
Pacific	619,178	144	22	1,278	16	11	6	5	22
Philippines	905,082	141	49	1,370	26	4	4	6	14
South America Northwest	1,405,745	227	39	1,697	33	9	2	8	19
South America South	1,348,816	190	45	1,587	29	10	1	4	15
United States Central (Note: Boundaries for areas follow mission boundaries and not necessarily state boundaries. Calculations were done according to state boundaries. When a state/province is split between more than one area, the area with the most predominance in the respective state/province received that state's membership and congregational statistics for calculation. For example, the Utah Area uses membership statistics for the state of Utah, even though parts of the state are outside of the Utah Area, and that area includes portions of other US states.)	1,076,549	290	0	2,658	18	20	5	8	33
United States Northeast	592,609	133	2	1,142	17	11	3	6	20
United States Southeast	649,256	132	0	1,170	16	12	3	3	18
United States Southwest	1,142,489	273	4	2,222	25	17	3	7	27
United States West	1,261,687	267	0	2,064	29	17	6	6	29
Utah	2,206,370	647	7	5,365	13	24	4	4	32

Temples
O=Operating Temples (includes temporary closures)
U=Temples Under Construction
A=Temples publicly announced to be constructed
T=Total Temples (announced and under construction)

== Area details ==
The following details are current as of August 1, 2025, and are primarily taken from the Facts and Statistics page of the church's official website (www.churchofjesuschrist.org). Ward and branch totals and membership numbers were last updated (with some approximations as noted in the previous section) in 2025.

=== Africa Central === Headquarters: Nairobi, Kenya Official Website 244,714 Members, 59 Stakes, 34 Districts, 744 Congregations, 15 Missions, 7 Temples
Area President: Paul B. Pieper Counselors: Alfred Kyungu & Christophe G. Giraud-Carrier
Missions:
Cameroon Yaounde Mission; DRC Kananga Mission; DRC Kinshasa East Mission; DRC Kinshasa North Mission; DRC Kinshasa South Mission; DRC Kinshasa West Mission; DRC Kolwezi Mission	DRC Lubumbashi Mission; DRC Mbuji-Mayi Mission; DRC Mwene-Ditu Mission; Ethiopia Addis Ababa Mission; Kenya Kisumu Mission; Kenya Nairobi East Mission	Kenya Nairobi West Mission; Republic of the Congo Brazzaville Mission; Rwanda Kigali Mission; Tanzania Dar es Salaam Mission; Uganda Kampala East Mission; Uganda Kampala West Mission
Temples:
Kananga DR Congo (site announced); Kinshasa Democratic Republic of the Congo Temple; Lubumbashi DR Congo (under construction)	Mbuji-Mayi DR Congo (announced); Nairobi Kenya Temple	Brazzaville ROC (under construction); Kampala Uganda (announced)
Geographic coverage: (Areas where the LDS Church has no official presence in italics)
Burundi; Cameroon; Central African Republic; Democratic Republic of the Congo; Djibouti; Equatorial Guinea; Eritrea; Ethiopia; Gabon; Kenya; Republic of the Congo; Rwanda; Seychelles; Somalia; South Sudan; Tanzania; Uganda

=== Africa South === Headquarters: Johannesburg, South Africa Official Website 228,689 Members, 51 Stakes, 27 Districts, 585 Congregations, 13 Missions, 8 Temples
Area President: Carlos A. Godoy Counselors: Vaiangina Sikahema & Ozani Farias
Missions:
Angola Luanda Mission; Angola Luanda North Mission; Botswana/Namibia Mission; Madagascar Antananarivo North Mission; Madagascar Antananarivo South Mission; Malawi Lilongwe Mission	Mozambique Beira Mission; Mozambique Maputo Mission; Mozambique Nampula Mission; South Africa Cape Town Mission; South Africa Durban Mission; South Africa East London	South Africa Johannesburg Mission; South Africa Pretoria Mission; Zambia Lusaka Mission; Zimbabwe Bulawayo Mission; Zimbabwe Harare East Mission; Zimbabwe Harare West Mission
Temples:
Luanda Angola (announced); Antananarivo Madagascar (under construction); Beira Mozambique (site announced)	Maputo Mozambique (announced); Cape Town South Africa (under construction)	Durban South Africa Temple; Johannesburg South Africa Temple; Harare Zimbabwe Temple
Geographic coverage: (Areas where the LDS Church has no official presence in italics)
Angola; Botswana; Comoros; Eswatini; Lesotho; Madagascar; Malawi; Mauritius; Mayotte (FRA); Mozambique; Namibia; Réunion (FRA); São Tomé and Príncipe; South Africa; Zambia; Zimbabwe

=== Africa West === Headquarters: Accra, Ghana Official Website 587,338 Members, 163 Stakes, 42 Districts, 1,171 wards, 738 branches, 32 missions, 13 temples
Area president: Adeyinka A. Ojediran Counselors: Isaac K. Morrison, D. Martin Goury, & Christian C. Chigbundu
Missions:
Benin Cotonou Mission; Côte d'Ivoire Abidjan East Mission; Côte d'Ivoire Abidjan North Mission; Côte d'Ivoire Abidjan South Mission; Côte d'Ivoire Abidjan West Mission; Côte d'Ivoire Daloa Mission; Côte d'Ivoire Yamoussoukro Mission; Ghana Accra East Mission; Ghana Accra North Mission; Ghana Accra South Mission; Ghana Accra West Mission	Ghana Cape Coast Mission; Ghana Kumasi Mission; Ghana Sunyani Mission; Ghana Takoradi Mission; Liberia Monrovia East Mission; Liberia Monrovia West Mission; Nigeria Aba Mission; Nigeria Abuja Mission; Nigeria Benin City Mission; Nigeria Calabar Mission; Nigeria Enugu Mission	Nigeria Ibadan Mission; Nigeria Lagos Mission; Nigeria Owerri Mission; Nigeria Port Harcourt North Mission; Nigeria Port Harcourt South Mission; Nigeria Uyo Mission; Senegal Dakar Mission; Sierra Leone Bo Mission; Sierra Leone Freetown Mission; Togo Lomé Mission
Temples:
Abidjan Ivory Coast Temple; Accra Ghana Temple; Cape Coast Ghana (announced); Kumasi Ghana (under construction); Monrovia Liberia (announced)	Aba Nigeria Temple; Abuja Nigeria (announced); Benin City Nigeria (under construction); Calabar Nigeria (site announced)	Eket Nigeria (site announced); Lagos Nigeria (under construction); Uyo Nigeria (announced); Freetown Sierra Leone (under construction)
Geographic coverage: (Areas where the LDS Church has no official presence in italics)
Benin; Burkina Faso; Chad; Ghana; Gambia; Guinea; Ivory Coast; Liberia; Mali; Mauritania; Niger; Nigeria; Senegal; Sierra Leone; Togo; Western Sahara

=== Asia === Headquarters: Hong Kong, China Official Website 184,927 Members, 33 Stakes, 23 Districts, 335 Congregations, 13 Missions, 9 Temples
Area President: Kelly R. Johnson Counselors: David L. Buckner & Wan-Liang Wu
Missions:
Cambodia Phnom Penh East Mission; Cambodia Phnom Pehn West Mission; China Hong Kong Mission; India Bengaluru Mission; India New Delhi Mission	Indonesia Jakarta Mission; Pakistan Service Mission; Singapore Mission; Taiwan Kaohsiung Mission	Taiwan Taipei Mission; Thailand Bangkok East Mission; Thailand Bangkok West Mission; Vietnam Hanoi Mission
Temples:
Phnom Penh Cambodia Temple; Hong Kong China Temple; Shanghai People's Republic of China (announced)	Bengaluru India (under construction); Jakarta Indonesia (site announced); Singapore (under construction)	Kaohsiung Taiwan (under construction); Taipei Taiwan Temple; Bangkok Thailand Temple
Geographic coverage: (Areas where the LDS Church has no official presence in italics)
Bangladesh; Bhutan; Brunei; Cambodia; China; East Timor; Hong Kong; India; Indonesia; Laos; Malaysia; Maldives; Myanmar; Nepal; Pakistan; Singapore; Sri Lanka; Taiwan; Thailand; Vietnam

=== Asia North === Headquarters: Tokyo, Japan Official Website 244,637 Members, 38 Stakes, 16 Districts, 381 Congregations, 12 Missions, 9 Temples
Area President: J. Kimo Esplin Counselors: Christopher H. Kim & Michael John U. Teh
Missions:
Japan Fukuoka Mission; Japan Kobe Mission; Japan Nagoya Mission; Japan Sapporo Mission; Japan Sendai Mission	Japan Tokyo North Mission; Japan Tokyo South Mission; Korea Busan Mission; Korea Seoul Mission	Korea Seoul South Mission; Micronesia Guam Mission; Mongolia Ulaanbaatar East Mission; Mongolia Ulaanbaatar West Mission
Temples:
Yigo Guam Temple; Fukuoka Japan Temple; Okinawa Japan Temple (temporarily closed)	Osaka Japan (site announced); Sapporo Japan Temple; Tokyo Japan Temple	Busan Korea (announced); Seoul Korea Temple; Ulaanbaatar Mongolia (site announced)
Geographic coverage: (Areas where the LDS Church has no official presence in italics)
Guam (US); Japan; Micronesia; Mongolia; North Korea; Northern Mariana Islands (US); Palau; South Korea

=== Brazil === Headquarters: São Paulo, Brazil Official Website 1,573,360 Members, 289 Stakes, 34 Districts, 2,008 Congregations, 37 Missions, 24 Temples
Area President: Ciro Schmeil Counselors: Denelson Silva, Ronald M. Barcellos, & B. Corey Cuvelier
Missions:
Brazil Belém Mission; Brazil Belo Horizonte Mission; Brazil Brasília Mission; Brazil Campinas Mission; Brazil Cuiabá Mission; Brazil Curitiba Mission; Brazil Curitiba South Mission; Brazil Feira de Santana Mission; Brazil Florianópolis Mission; Brazil Fortaleza Mission; Brazil Fortaleza East Mission; Brazil Goiânia Mission; Brazil Guarulhos Mission; Brazil João Pessoa Mission	Brazil Juiz de Fora Mission; Brazil Londrina Mission; Brazil Maceió Mission; Brazil Manaus North Mission; Brazil Manaus South Mission; Brazil Natal Mission; Brazil Piracicaba Mission; Brazil Porto Alegre North Mission; Brazil Porto Alegre South Mission; Brazil Recife North Mission; Brazil Recife South Mission; Brazil Ribeirão Preto Mission; Brazil Rio de Janeiro North Mission	Brazil Rio de Janeiro South Mission; Brazil Salvador Mission; Brazil Santa Maria Mission; Brazil Santos Mission; Brazil São Bernardo Mission; Brazil São Paulo East Mission; Brazil São Paulo Interlagos Mission; Brazil São Paulo North Mission; Brazil São Paulo South Mission; Brazil São Paulo West Mission; Brazil Sorocaba Mission; Brazil Teresina Mission; Brazil Vitória Mission
Temples:
Belém Brazil Temple; Belo Horizonte Brazil Temple; Brasília Brazil Temple; Campinas Brazil Temple; Campo Grande Brazil (site announced); Curitiba Brazil Temple; florianopolis Brazil (site announced); Fortaleza Brazil Temple	Goiânia Brazil (site announced); João Pessoa Brazil (under construction); Londrina Brazil (under construction); Maceió Brazil (groundbreaking scheduled); Manaus Brazil Temple; Natal Brazil (under construction); Porto Alegre Brazil Temple; Recife Brazil Temple	Ribeirão Preto Brazil (under construction); Rio de Janeiro Brazil Temple; Salvador Brazil Temple; Santos Brazil (under construction); São Paulo Brazil Temple; São Paulo East Brazil (site announced); Teresina Brazil (under construction); Vitória Brazil (site announced)
Geographic coverage:
Brazil

=== Canada === Headquarters: Calgary, Alberta & Toronto, Ontario Official website 211,581 Members, 56 Stakes, 3 Districts, 501 Congregations, 6 Missions, 11 Temples
Area President: Vern P. Stanfill Counselors: Matthew L. Carpenter & James E. Evanson
Missions:
Canada Calgary Mission; Canada Edmonton Mission; Canada Halifax Mission	Canada Montreal Mission; Canada Toronto East Mission; Canada Toronto West Mission	Canada Vancouver Mission; Canada Winnipeg Mission
Temples:
Calgary Alberta Temple; Cardston Alberta Temple; Edmonton Alberta Temple; Lethbridge Alberta (under construction)	Vancouver British Columbia Temple; Winnipeg Manitoba Temple; Toronto Ontario Temple	Halifax Nova Scotia Temple; Montreal Quebec Temple; Regina Saskatchewan Temple
Geographic coverage:
Canada with exception of Yukon Territory; Saint Pierre and Miquelon

=== Caribbean === Headquarters: Santo Domingo, Dominican Republic Official Website 419,711 Members, 67 Stakes, 26 Districts, 618 Congregations, 14 Missions, 6 Temples
Area President: Valeri V. Cordon Counselors: Hugo Montoya & Ahmad S. Corbitt
Missions:
Barbados Bridgetown Mission; Dominican Republic Santiago Mission; Dominican Republic Santo Domingo East Mission; Dominican Republic Santo Domingo North Mission	Dominican Republic Santo Domingo West Mission; Guyana Georgetown Mission; Haiti Port-au-Prince Mission; Jamaica Kingston Mission	Puerto Rico San Juan Mission; Venezuela Barcelona Mission; Venezuela Caracas Mission; Venezuela Maracaibo Mission; Venezuela Valencia Mission
Temples:
Santiago Dominican Republic (announced); Santo Domingo Dominican Republic Temple	Port-au-Prince Haiti Temple; San Juan Puerto Rico Temple	Caracas Venezuela Temple; Maracaibo Venezuela (announced)
Geographic coverage: (Areas where the LDS Church has no official presence in italics)
Anguilla (UK); Antigua and Barbuda; Aruba (NED); Bahamas; Barbados; Bonaire (NED); Cayman Islands (UK); Cuba; Curaçao (NED); Dominica; Dominican Republic; French Guiana (FRA); Grenada; Guadeloupe (FRA); Guyana; Haiti; Jamaica; Martinique (FRA); Montserrat (FRA); Puerto Rico (US); Saint Barthelemy (FRA); Saint Kitts and Nevis; Saint Lucia; Saint Martin (FRA); Saint Vincent and the Grenadines; Sint Maarten (NED); Suriname; Trinidad and Tobago; Turks and Caicos Islands; Venezuela; Virgin Islands (UK); Virgin Islands (US)

=== Central America === Headquarters: Guatemala City, Guatemala 861,618 Members, 133 Stakes, 24 Districts, 1,119 Congregations, 19 Missions, 13 Temples
Area President: Patricio M. Giuffra Counselors: Ryan K. Olsen & Gregorio E. Casillas
Missions:
Costa Rica San José East Mission; Costa Rica San José West Mission; El Salvador San Salvador East Mission; El Salvador San Salvador West Mission; El Salvador Santa Ana Mission; Guatemala Antigua Mission	Guatemala Cobán/Belize Mission; Guatemala Guatemala City Mission; Guatemala Guatemala City Central Mission; Guatemala Guatemala City East Mission; Guatemala Quetzaltenango Mission; Guatemala Retalhuleu Mission; Honduras Comayaguela Mission	Honduras San Pedro Sula East Mission; Honduras San Pedro Sula West Mission; Honduras Tegucigalpa Mission; Nicaragua Managua North Mission; Nicaragua Managua South Mission; Panama Panama City Mission
Temples:
San José Costa Rica Temple; San Salvador El Salvador Temple; Santa Ana El Salvador (announced); Cobán Guatemala Temple; Guatemala City Guatemala Temple	Huehuetenango Guatemala (under construction); Miraflores Guatemala City Guatemala (dedication scheduled); Quetzaltenango Guatemala Temple; Retalhuleu Guatemala (site announced)	San Pedro Sula Honduras Temple; Tegucigalpa Honduras Temple; Managua Nicaragua (dedication scheduled); Panama City Panama Temple
Geographic coverage:
Belize; Costa Rica; El Salvador; Guatemala; Honduras; Nicaragua; Panama

=== Eurasian === Headquarters: Moscow, Russia 22,628 Members, 2 Stakes, 5 Districts, 66 Congregations, 4 Missions, 1 Temple
Area President: Aleksandr A. Drachyov (Area Seventy) Counselors: Nikolai Ustyuzhaninov (Area Seventy) & Vladimir N. Astashov (Area Seventy)
Missions:
Armenia/Georgia Mission (Yerevan); Russia Moscow Mission	Russia Novosibirsk Mission	Russia Yekaterinburg Mission
Temples:
Russia (announced)		
Geographic coverage: (Areas where the LDS Church has no official presence in italics)
Armenia; Belarus; Georgia; Kazakhstan; Kyrgyzstan; Russia

=== Europe Central === Headquarters: Frankfurt, Germany 239,951 Members, 66 Stakes, 9 Districts, 697 Congregations, 20 Missions, 13 Temples
Area President: Jack N. Gerard Counselors: James W. McConkie III & Michael Cziesla
Missions:
Adriatic North Mission; Albania Tirana Mission; Alpine German-Speaking Mission; Belgium/Netherlands Mission; Bulgaria Sofia Mission; Czech/Slovak Mission; Europe Central Turkic and Persian-Speaking Mission	France Lyon Mission; France Paris North Mission; France Paris South Mission; Germany Berlin Mission; Germany Frankfurt Mission; Germany Hamburg Mission; Greece Athens Mission; Hungary Budapest Mission	Italy Milan Mission; Italy Rome Mission; Poland Warsaw Mission; Romania Bucharest Mission; Spain Barcelona Mission; Spain Madrid East Mission; Spain Madrid North Mission; Spain Madrid South Mission
Temples:
Vienna Austria (groundbreaking scheduled); Brussels Belgium (under construction); Paris France Temple; Frankfurt Germany Temple; Freiberg Germany Temple	Hamburg Germany (site announced); Budapest Hungary (under construction); Milan Italy (announced); Rome Italy Temple	The Hague Netherlands Temple; Barcelona Spain (under construction); Madrid Spain Temple; Bern Switzerland Temple
Geographic coverage: (Areas where the LDS Church has no official presence in italics)
Albania; Andorra; Austria; Azerbaijan; Belgium; Bosnia and Herzegovina; Bulgaria; Canary Islands (ESP); Croatia; Cyprus; Czech Republic; France; Germany; Greece; Hungary; Italy; Kosovo; Liechtenstein; Luxembourg; Malta; Monaco; Montenegro; Netherlands; North Macedonia; Poland; Romania; San Marino; Serbia; Slovakia; Slovenia; Spain; Switzerland; Tajikistan; Turkey; Turkmenistan; Uzbekistan; Vatican City

=== Europe North === Headquarters: High Wycombe, England Official Website 301,924 Members, 67 Stakes, 9 Districts, 590 Congregations, 16 Missions, 13 Temples
Area President: Kevin W. Pearson Counselors: Marcos A. Aidukaitis & Paul H. Sinclair
Missions:
Baltic Mission; Cape Verde Mindelo Mission; Cape Verde Praia Mission; Denmark Copenhagen Mission; England Birmingham Mission; England Bristol Mission	England Leeds Mission; England London Mission; England Manchester Mission; Finland Helsinki Mission; Norway Oslo Mission; Portugal Lisbon Mission	Portugal Porto Mission; Scotland/Ireland Mission; Sweden Stockholm Mission; Ukraine Dnipro Mission; Ukraine Kyiv/Moldova Mission
Temples:
Praia Cape Verde Temple; Copenhagen Denmark Temple; Birmingham England (under construction); London England Temple; Preston England Temple	Helsinki Finland Temple; Dublin Ireland (announced); Oslo Norway (site announced); Porto Portugal (announced)	Lisbon Portugal Temple; Edinburgh Scotland (announced); Stockholm Sweden (closed for renovation); Kyiv Ukraine Temple
Geographic coverage: (Areas where the LDS Church has no official presence in italics)
Cape Verde; Denmark; Greenland (DEN); Estonia; Finland; Guinea-Bissau; Iceland; Ireland; Latvia; Lithuania; Moldova; Norway; Portugal; Azores (POR); Madeira (POR); Sweden; Ukraine; United Kingdom; Gibraltar (UK); Guernsey (UK); Isle of Man (UK); Jersey (UK); Saint Helena, Ascension and Tristan da Cunha (UK)

=== Mexico === Headquarters: Mexico City, Mexico Official Website (Español) 1,572,287 Members, 231 Stakes, 42 Districts, 1,875 Congregations, 34 Missions, 27 Temples
Area President: Moises Villanueva Counselors: Jose L. Alonso, Brik V. Eyre, & Jorge M. Alvarado
Missions:
Mexico Aguascalientes Mission; Mexico Cancún Mission; Mexico Chihuahua Mission; Mexico Ciudad Juárez Mission; Mexico Cuautla Mission; Mexico Cuernavaca Mission; Mexico Culiacán Mission; Mexico Guadalajara Mission; Mexico Guadalajara East Mission; Mexico Hermosillo Mission; Mexico Mérida Mission; Mexico Mexicali Mission	Mexico Mexico City East Mission; Mexico Mexico City North Mission; Mexico Mexico City Northwest Mission; Mexico Mexico City South Mission; Mexico Mexico City Southeast Mission; Mexico Mexico City West Mission; Mexico Monterrey East Mission; Mexico Monterrey West Mission; Mexico Oaxaca Mission; Mexico Pachuca Mission; Mexico Puebla East Mission; Mexico Puebla North Mission	Mexico Puebla South Mission; Mexico Querétaro Mission; Mexico Saltillo Mission; Mexico Tampico Mission; Mexico Tijuana Mission; Mexico Torreón Mission; Mexico Tula Mission; Mexico Tuxtla Gutiérrez Mission; Mexico Veracruz Mission; Mexico Villahermosa Mission; Mexico Xalapa Mission
Temples:
Cancún Mexico (announced); Ciudad Juárez Mexico Temple; Chihuahua Mexico (site announced); Colonia Juárez Chihuahua Mexico Temple; Culiacán Mexico (site announced); Cuernavaca Mexico (groundbreaking scheduled); Guadalajara Mexico Temple; Hermosillo Sonora Mexico Temple; Juchitán de Zaragoza Mexico (announced)	Mérida Mexico Temple; Mexico City Mexico Temple; Mexico City Benemérito Mexico (site announced); Monterrey Mexico Temple; Oaxaca Mexico Temple; Pachuca Mexico (announced); Puebla Mexico Temple; Querétaro Mexico (under construction); Reynosa Mexico (announced)	San Luis Potosí Mexico (dedication scheduled); Tampico Mexico Temple; Tijuana Mexico Temple; Toluca Mexico (site announced); Torreón Mexico (dedication scheduled); Tula Mexico (announced); Tuxtla Gutiérrez Mexico Temple; Veracruz Mexico Temple; Villahermosa Mexico Temple
Geographic coverage:
Mexico

=== Middle East/ Africa North === Headquarters: Salt Lake City, Utah 3,424 Members, 2 Stakes, 3 Districts, 22 Congregations, 0 Missions, 1 Temple
Area President: Anthony D. Perkins Counselors: Adilson de Paula Parrella & Edward B. Rowe<
Missions:
No Missions
Temples:
Dubai United Arab Emirates (announced)
Geographic coverage: (Areas where the LDS Church has no official presence in italics)
Afghanistan; Algeria; Bahrain; Egypt; Iran; Iraq; Israel; Jordan; Kuwait; Lebanon; Libya; Morocco; Oman; Qatar; Saudi Arabia; Sudan; Syria; Tunisia; United Arab Emirates; Yemen

=== Pacific === Headquarters: Auckland, New Zealand Official website 619,178 Members, 144 Stakes, 22 Districts, 1,278 Congregations, 16 Missions, 22 Temples
Area President: Taniela B. Wakolo Counselors: Jeremy R. Jaggi, Hans T. Boom, & Matthew J. Eyring
Missions:
Australia Adelaide Mission; Australia Brisbane North Mission; Australia Brisbane South Mission; Australia Melbourne Mission; Australia Perth Mission; Australia Sydney Mission; Fiji Suva Mission	Marshall Islands /Kiribati Mission; New Zealand Auckland Mission; New Zealand Hamilton Mission; New Zealand Wellington Mission; Papua New Guinea Daru Mission; Papua New Guinea Lae Mission; Papua New Guinea Madang Mission	Papua New Guinea Port Moresby Mission; Samoa Apia East Mission; Samoa Apia West Mission; Solomon Islands Honiara Mission; Tahiti Papeete Mission; Tonga Nukuʻalofa Mission; Vanuatu Port Vila Mission
Temples:
Pago Pago American Samoa (dedication scheduled); Adelaide Australia Temple; Brisbane Australia Temple; Brisbane Australia South (announced); Liverpool Australia (announced); Melbourne Australia Temple; Perth Australia Temple; Sydney Australia Temple	Suva Fiji Temple; Uturoa French Polynesia (announced); Yigo Guam Temple; Tarawa Kiribati (under construction); Nouméa New Caledonia (announced); Auckland New Zealand Temple; Hamilton New Zealand Temple; Wellington New Zealand (under construction)	Port Moresby Papua New Guinea (under construction); Apia Samoa Temple; Savai'i Samoa (site announced); Papeete Tahiti Temple; Neiafu Tonga (under construction); Nuku'alofa Tonga Temple; Port Vila Vanuatu (under construction)
Geographic coverage:
American Samoa (US); Australia; Cook Islands (NZ); Fiji; French Polynesia (FRA); Kiribati; Marshall Islands; Nauru; New Caledonia (FRA); New Zealand; Niue (NZ); Pitcairn Islands (UK); Papua New Guinea; Samoa; Solomon Islands; Tonga; Tuvalu; Tokelau (NZ); Vanuatu; Wallis and Futuna (FRA)

=== Philippines === Headquarters: Quezon City, Philippines Official Website 905,082 Members, 141 Stakes, 49 Districts, 1,370 Congregations, 26 Missions, 14 Temples
Area President: Carlos G. Revillo Jr. Counselors: Chi Hong (Sam) Wong & Steven D. Shumway
Missions:
Philippines Angeles Mission; Philippines Antipolo Mission; Philippines Bacolod Mission; Philippines Baguio Mission; Philippines Butuan Mission; Philippines Cabanatuan Mission; Philippines Cagayan de Oro Mission; Philippines Cauayan Mission; Philippines Cavite Mission; Philippines Cebu Mission; Philippines Cebu East Mission	Philippines Davao Mission; Philippines Dumaguete Mission; Philippines General Santos Mission; Philippines Iloilo Mission; Philippines Laoag Mission; Philippines Legazpi Mission; Philippines Lingayen Mission; Philippines Lipa Mission; Philippines Manila Mission; Philippines Naga Mission	Philippines Olongapo Mission; Philippines Ormoc Mission; Philippines Ozamiz Mission; Philippines Puerto Princesa Mission; Philippines Quezon City Mission; Philippines Quezon City North Mission; Philippines San Pablo Mission; Philippines Tacloban Mission; Philippines Tuguegarao Mission; Philippines Urdaneta Mission
Temples:
Alabang Philippines Temple; Bacolod Philippines Temple; Cagayan de Oro Philippines (under construction); Cebu City Philippines Temple; Davao Philippines Temple	Iloilo Philippines (site announced); Laoag Philippines (announced); Manila Philippines Temple; Naga Philippines (under construction); San Jose del Monte Philippines (announced)	Santiago Philippines (site announced); Tacloban City Philippines (under construction); Tuguegarao City Philippines (site announced); Urdaneta Philippines Temple
Geographic coverage:
Philippines

=== South America Northwest === Headquarters: Lima, Peru Official Website (Spanish) 1,405,745 Members, 227 Stakes, 39 Districts, 1,697 Congregations, 33 Missions, 19 Temples
Area President: Juan Pablo Villar Counselors: Sandino Roman & Steven C. Barlow
Missions:
Bolivia Cochabamba North Mission; Bolivia Cochabamba South Mission; Bolivia La Paz Mission; Bolivia La Paz El Alto Mission; Bolivia Santa Cruz Mission; Bolivia Santa Cruz North Mission; Colombia Barranquilla Mission; Colombia Bogotá North Mission; Colombia Bogotá South Mission; Colombia Cali Mission; Colombia Medellin Mission; Ecuador Guayaquil East Mission	Ecuador Guayaquil North Mission; Ecuador Guayaquil South Mission; Ecuador Guayaquil West Mission; Ecuador Quito North Mission; Ecuador Quito South Mission; Ecuador Quito West Mission; Perú Arequipa Mission; Perú Chiclayo Mission; Perú Cusco Mission; Perú Huancayo Mission; Perú Iquitos Mission; Perú Lima Central Mission	Perú Lima East Mission; Perú Lima Limatambo Mission; Perú Lima North Mission; Peru Lima Northeast Mission; Peru Lima Northwest Mission; Perú Lima South Mission; Perú Lima West Mission; Perú Piura Mission; Perú Tacna Mission; Perú Trujillo North Mission; Perú Trujillo South Mission
Temples:
Cochabamba Bolivia Temple; La Paz Bolivia (groundbreaking scheduled); Santa Cruz Bolivia (under construction); Barranquilla Colombia Temple; Bogotá Colombia Temple; Cali Colombia (under construction); Medellín Colombia (site announced)	Guayaquil Ecuador Temple; Otavalo Ecuador (site announced); Quito Ecuador Temple; Arequipa Peru Temple; Chiclayo Peru (announced); Chorrillos Peru (announced); Huancayo Peru (announced)	Iquitos Peru (groundbreaking scheduled); Cusco Peru (site announced); Lima Peru Los Olivos Temple; Lima Peru Temple; Piura Peru (groundbreaking scheduled); Trujillo Peru Temple
Geographic coverage:
Bolivia; Colombia; Ecuador; Perú

=== South America South === Headquarters: Buenos Aires, Argentina Official Website (Spanish) 1,348,816 Members, 190 Stakes, 45 Districts, 1,587 Congregations, 29 Missions, 15 Temples
Area President: Alan R. Walker Counselors: Mathias Held & Sergio R. Vargas
Missions:
Argentina Bahía Blanca Mission; Argentina Buenos Aires East Mission; Argentina Buenos Aires North Mission; Argentina Buenos Aires South Mission; Argentina Buenos Aires West Mission; Argentina Comodoro Rivadavia Mission; Argentina Córdoba Mission; Argentina Mendoza Mission; Argentina Neuquén Mission; Argentina Resistencia Mission; Argentina Rosario Mission	Argentina Salta Mission; Argentina Santa Fe Mission; Argentina Tucuman Mission; Chile Antofagasta Mission; Chile Concepción Mission; Chile Concepción South Mission; Chile La Serena Mission; Chile Puerto Montt Mission; Chile Rancagua Mission; Chile Santiago East Mission	Chile Santiago North Mission; Chile Santiago South Mission; Chile Santiago West Mission; Chile Viña del Mar Mission; Paraguay Asunción East Mission; Paraguay Asunción North Mission; Paraguay Asunción South Mission; Uruguay Montevideo East Mission; Uruguay Montevideo West Mission; Uruguay Salto Mission
Temples:
Bahía Blanca Argentina Temple; Buenos Aires Argentina Temple; Buenos Aires City Center Argentina (site announced); Córdoba Argentina Temple; Mendoza Argentina Temple; Rosario Argentina (site announced)	Salta Argentina Temple; Antofagasta Chile Temple; Concepción Chile Temple; Puerto Montt Chile (site announced); Santiago Chile Temple	Santiago West Chile (under construction); Viña del Mar Chile (site announced); Asunción Paraguay Temple; Montevideo Uruguay Temple; Rivera Uruguay (announced)
Geographic coverage:
Argentina; Chile; Falkland Islands (UK); Paraguay; Uruguay

=== United States Central === Headquarters: Salt Lake City, Utah 1,076,549 Members, 290 Stakes, 2,658 Congregations, 18 Missions, 33 Temples
Area President: Jose A. Teixeira Counselors: Ricardo P. Gimenez, Karl D. Hirst, & James O. Fantone
Missions:
Colorado Colorado Springs Mission; Colorado Denver North Mission; Colorado Denver South Mission; Colorado Fort Collins Mission; Idaho Boise Mission; Idaho Idaho Falls Mission; Idaho Pocatello Mission	Illinois Chicago Mission; Iowa Iowa City Mission; Kansas Wichita Mission; Minnesota Minneapolis Mission; Missouri Independence Mission; Missouri Kansas City Mission; Missouri St. Louis Mission	Montana Billings Mission; Montana Missoula Mission; Nebraska Omaha Mission; North Dakota Bismarck Mission; Wisconsin Milwaukee Mission; Wyoming Cheyenne Mission
Temples:
Colorado Springs Colorado (under construction); Denver Colorado Temple; Fort Collins Colorado Temple; Grand Junction Colorado Temple; Boise Idaho Temple; Burley Idaho Temple; Caldwell Idaho (site announced); Coeur d'Alene Idaho (under construction); Idaho Falls Idaho Temple; Meridian Idaho Temple; Montpelier Idaho (dedication scheduled)	Pocatello Idaho Temple; Rexburg Idaho Temple; Teton River Idaho (under construction); Twin Falls Idaho Temple; Chicago Illinois Temple; Nauvoo Illinois Temple; Des Moines Iowa (site announced); Wichita Kansas (dedication scheduled); St. Paul Minnesota Temple; Kansas City Missouri Temple; St. Louis Missouri Temple	Springfield Missouri (under construction); Billings Montana Temple; Helena Montana Temple; Missoula Montana (under construction); Winter Quarters Nebraska Temple; Bismarck North Dakota Temple; Rapid City South Dakota (site announced); Milwaukee Wisconsin (announced); Casper Wyoming Temple; Cody Wyoming (dedication scheduled); Star Valley Wyoming Temple
Geographic coverage:
Colorado; Idaho (except panhandle); Illinois; Indiana (small portion); Iowa; Kansas; Michigan (Upper Peninsula); Minnesota; Missouri; Montana; Nebraska; North Dakota; South Dakota; Wisconsin; Wyoming

=== United States Northeast === Headquarters: Salt Lake City, Utah Official Website 592,609 Members, 133 Stakes, 2 Districts, 1,142 Congregations, 17 Missions, 20 Temples
Area President: Robert M. Daines Counselors: Joni L. Koch, Alan T. Phillips, & Kevin J. Hathaway
Missions:
Indiana Fort Wayne Mission; Indiana Indianapolis Mission; Maryland Baltimore Mission; Massachusetts Boston Mission; Michigan Detroit Mission; Michigan Lansing Mission; New Hampshire Manchester Mission	New Jersey Morristown Mission; New York New York City Mission; New York Syracuse Mission; Ohio Cincinnati Mission; Ohio Columbus Mission; Pennsylvania Philadelphia Mission	Pennsylvania Pittsburgh Mission; Virginia Norfolk Mission; Virginia Richmond Mission; Washington, D.C. North Mission; Washington, D.C. South Mission; West Virginia Charleston Mission
Temples:
Hartford Connecticut Temple; Indianapolis Indiana Temple; Portland Maine (announced); Boston Massachusetts Temple; Detroit Michigan Temple; Grand Rapids Michigan (under construction); Summit New Jersey (announced)	Manhattan New York (closed for renovation); Palmyra New York Temple; Cincinnati Ohio (groundbreaking scheduled); Cleveland Ohio Temple; Columbus Ohio Temple; Harrisburg Pennsylvania (site announced); Philadelphia Pennsylvania Temple	Pittsburgh Pennsylvania Temple; Richmond Virginia Temple; Roanoke Virginia (announced); Norfolk Virginia (site announced); Winchester Virginia (under construction); Washington D.C. Temple
Geographic coverage:
Connecticut; Delaware; Indiana; Maine; Maryland; Massachusetts; Michigan; New Hampshire; New Jersey; New York; Ohio; Pennsylvania; Rhode Island; Vermont; Virginia; Washington, D.C.; West Virginia; Bermuda (UK); Saint Pierre and Miquelon (FRA)

=== United States Southeast === Headquarters: Salt Lake City, Utah 649,256 Members, 132 Stakes, 1,170 Congregations, 16 Missions, 18 Temples
President: Massimo De Feo Counselors: Aroldo B. Cavalcante & John D. Amos
Missions:
Alabama Birmingham Mission; Arkansas Bentonville Mission; Arkansas Little Rock Mission; Florida Fort Lauderdale Mission; Florida Jacksonville Mission; Florida Orlando Mission; Florida Tallahassee Mission	Florida Tampa Mission; Georgia Atlanta Mission; Georgia Atlanta North Mission; Kentucky Louisville Mission; Louisiana Baton Rouge Mission; Mississippi Jackson Mission	North Carolina Charlotte Mission; North Carolina Raleigh Mission; South Carolina Charleston Mission; South Carolina Columbia Mission; Tennessee Knoxville Mission; Tennessee Nashville Mission
Temples:
Birmingham Alabama Temple; Huntsville Alabama (under construction); Bentonville Arkansas Temple; Fort Lauderdale Florida Temple; Jacksonville Florida (under construction); Orlando Florida (closed for renovation); Tallahassee Florida Temple	Tampa Florida (under construction); Atlanta Georgia Temple; Louisville Kentucky Temple; Baton Rouge Louisiana Temple; Springfield Missouri (under construction); Charlotte North Carolina (site announced)	Raleigh North Carolina Temple; Columbia South Carolina Temple; Greenville South Carolina (site announced); Knoxville Tennessee (dedication scheduled); Memphis Tennessee Temple; Nashville Tennessee Temple
Geographic coverage:
Alabama; Arkansas; Florida; Georgia; Indiana (Southern); Kentucky; Louisiana; Mississippi; Missouri (Southern); North Carolina; Oklahoma (small portion); South Carolina; Tennessee

=== United States Southwest === Headquarters: Salt Lake City, Utah 1,142,489 Members, 273 Stakes, 4 Districts, 2,222 Congregations, 25 Missions, 27 Temples
Area president: Michael A. Dunn Counselors: Joaquin E. Costa & Pedro X. Larreal
Missions:
Arizona Flagstaff Mission; Arizona Gilbert Mission; Arizona Mesa Mission; Arizona Phoenix East Mission; Arizona Phoenix West Mission; Arizona Tempe Mission; Arizona Tucson Mission; Nevada Henderson Mission; Nevada Las Vegas East Mission; Nevada Las Vegas West Mission	Nevada Reno Mission; New Mexico Albuquerque Mission; New Mexico Farmington Mission; Oklahoma Oklahoma City Mission; Oklahoma Tulsa Mission; Texas Austin Mission; Texas Dallas East Mission; Texas Dallas North Mission; Texas Dallas South Mission; Texas Dallas West Mission	Texas El Paso Mission; Texas Fort Worth Mission; Texas Houston East Mission; Texas Houston North Mission; Texas Houston South Mission; Texas Houston West Mission; Texas Lubbock Mission; Texas McAllen Mission; Texas San Antonio North Mission; Texas San Antonio South Mission
Temples:
Flagstaff Arizona Temple (site announced); Gila Valley Arizona Temple; Gilbert Arizona Temple; Mesa Arizona Temple; Phoenix Arizona Temple; Queen Creek Arizona (site announced); Snowflake Arizona Temple; Tucson Arizona Temple; Yuma Arizona (site announced); Elko Nevada Temple	Las Vegas Nevada Temple; Lone Mountain Nevada Temple (under construction); Reno Nevada Temple; Albuquerque New Mexico Temple; Farmington New Mexico Temple; Tulsa Oklahoma (under construction); Oklahoma City Oklahoma Temple; Austin Texas Temple (under construction); Dallas Texas Temple	El Paso Texas Temple (announced); Fairview Texas Temple (under construction); Fort Worth Texas (dedication scheduled); Houston Texas Temple; Fort Bend Texas (site announced); Lubbock Texas Temple; McAllen Texas Temple; San Antonio Texas Temple; Monticello Utah Temple
Geographic coverage:
Arizona; Nevada; New Mexico; Oklahoma; Texas; California (small portions); Colorado (southwest portion); Louisiana (small portion); Utah (small portions)

=== United States West === Headquarters: Salt Lake City, Utah 1,261,687 Members, 267 Stakes, 2,064 Congregations, 29 Missions, 29 Temples
Area President: Takashi Wada Counselors: Peter M. Johnson, Hugo E. Martinez, & Hutch U. Fale
Missions:
Alaska Anchorage Mission; California Anaheim Mission; California Arcadia Mission; California Bakersfield Mission; California Carlsbad Mission; California Fresno Mission; California Los Angeles Mission; California Modesto Mission; California Newport Beach Mission; California Oakland/San Francisco Mission; California Ontario Mission	California Riverside Mission; California Roseville Mission; California Sacramento Mission; California San Bernardino Mission; California San Diego Mission; California San Jose Mission; California Santa Rosa Mission; California Ventura Mission; California Victorville Mission; Hawaii Honolulu Mission; Hawaii Laie Mission	Idaho Coeur d’Alene Mission; Oregon Eugene Mission; Oregon Portland Mission; Oregon Salem Mission; Washington Everett Mission; Washington Kennewick Mission; Washington Seattle Mission; Washington Spokane Mission; Washington Tacoma Mission; Washington Vancouver Mission; Washington Yakima Mission
Temples:
Anchorage Alaska Temple; Fairbanks Alaska Temple (under construction); Bakersfield California (site announced); Feather River California Temple; Fresno California Temple; Los Angeles California Temple; Modesto California (dedication scheduled); Newport Beach California Temple; Oakland California Temple; Redlands California Temple	Sacramento California Temple; San Diego California Temple; Sunnyvale California (site announced); Yorba Linda California Temple; Honolulu Hawaii (announced); Kahului Hawaii (site announced); Kona Hawaii Temple Need display_name (closed for renovation); Laie Hawaii Temple; Coeur d'Alene Idaho (under construction)	Medford Oregon Temple; Portland Oregon Temple; Willamette Valley Oregon Temple; Columbia River Washington Temple; Marysville Washington Temple (announced); Moses Lake Washington Temple; Seattle Washington Temple; Spokane Washington Temple; Tacoma Washington (site announced); Vancouver Washington Temple (under construction)
Geographic coverage:
Alaska & Yukon Territory; California; Hawaii; Idaho (Panhandle); Oregon; Washington

=== Utah === Headquarters: Salt Lake City, Utah Official Website 2,206,370 Members, 647 Stakes, 7 Districts, 5,365 Congregations, 13 Missions, 32 Temples
Area President: Brian K. Taylor Counselors: John A. McCune, Jorge T. Becerra, Thabo Lebothoa
Missions:
Utah Layton Mission; Utah Ogden Mission; Utah Orem Mission; Utah Provo Mission	Utah Salt Lake City Mission; Utah Salt Lake City East Mission; Utah Salt Lake City Headquarters Mission; Utah Salt Lake City South Mission	Utah Salt Lake City West Mission; Utah Saratoga Springs Mission; Utah Spanish Fork Mission; Utah St. George Mission
Temples:
Bountiful Utah Temple; Brigham City Utah Temple; Cedar City Utah Temple; Deseret Peak Utah Temple; Draper Utah Temple; Ephraim Utah (dedication scheduled); Heber Valley Utah (under construction); Jordan River Utah Temple; Layton Utah Temple; Lehi Utah (site announced); Lindon Utah Temple	Logan Utah Temple; Manti Utah Temple; Monticello Utah Temple; Mount Timpanogos Utah Temple; Ogden Utah Temple; Oquirrh Mountain Utah Temple; Orem Utah Temple; Payson Utah Temple; Price Utah Temple (announced); Provo City Center Temple; Provo Utah Temple Need display_name (closed for renovation)	Red Cliffs Utah Temple; Salt Lake (closed for renovation); Saratoga Springs Utah Temple; Smithfield Utah (dedication scheduled); Spanish Fork Utah Temple (site announced); St. George Utah Temple; Syracuse Utah Temple; Taylorsville Utah Temple; Vernal Utah Temple; West Jordan Utah (site announced)
Geographic coverage:
Utah; Arizona (small portion); Idaho (small portion); Nevada (small portion)

== See also ==
- District (LDS Church)
- List of area seventies of The Church of Jesus Christ of Latter-day Saints
- List of general authorities of The Church of Jesus Christ of Latter-day Saints
- Regional representative of the Twelve
- Seventy: Area seventies and additional quorums of seventy
