= District (LDS Church) =

Administrative unit in The Church of Jesus Christ of Latter-day Saints

A district of the Church of Jesus Christ of Latter-day Saints (LDS Church) is a geographical administrative unit composed of a number of congregations called branches.

A Michigan LDS district meeting in the early 20th century

A district is a subdivision of a mission of the church and in many ways is analogous to a stake of the church. The leader of a district is the mission president, who selects a local district president as his agent. The district president may choose two men to assist him; the three together form the district presidency. The three members of the district presidency are given the honorific title "President".

Districts are usually established where the church is new or where there are insufficient numbers of church members to organize a stake. Prior to the late 1920s, districts were known as conferences. A district may be thought of as a stake in a beginning or embryonic state.

== Notable differences between districts and stakes ==
A district has a function analogous to a stake, but is organized where there are too few members to organize a stake. Its relationship to a stake is similar to the relationship between a ward and a branch. Once the membership in a district achieves sufficient numbers, it may be reorganized as a stake. Districts differ from stakes in the following ways:

- A district does not have its own patriarch. Members are assigned to the nearest stake patriarch.
- Districts do not have a high priests quorum. The high priests quorum is a stake organization. Men residing in a district may not be ordained to the priesthood office of high priest.
- Districts are composed of branches only and cannot have wards, regardless of the size of the branches.
- The presiding authority in a district is the mission president; members of the mission presidency conduct temple recommend, patriarchal blessing, Melchizedek priesthood ordination, and missionary qualification interviews, not members of the district presidency.
- The district presidency serves as a representative of the mission presidency since many missions have multiple districts and the mission presidency may live a great distance from the district itself.
- In many very small and remote districts, some male missionaries serve as branch presidents or in other leadership positions at the local and district levels. Such arrangements may also be made in branches of stakes, but it is more common in districts.

=== Minimum requirements and creation ===
There is no minimum number of members or branches needed to create a district. A mission president can propose the creation of a district by lodging an application to the First Presidency and Quorum of the Twelve Apostles.

=== Conversion to a stake ===
For a district to become a stake, the following requirements must be met:

- a minimum number of members. In the United States and Canada, the number is 3000. Outside of the United States and Canada, the number is 1900.
- at least five congregations which can function as wards. Each ward requires at least 15 active, full-tithe-paying Melchizedek priesthood holders. Wards should have at least 300 members in the United States and Canada; elsewhere, they must have at least 150 members.
- an additional 24 active, full-tithe-paying Melchizedek priesthood holders in the stake boundaries.

== Temple district ==
The LDS Church also uses a geographical division called a temple district. A temple district is a geographical area that is assigned to a church temple. Members residing in a temple district are asked to attend the temple that defines the district. Members may attend any of the church's temples, but temple districts are designed to help members determine what temple is closest to where they reside. A temple district is defined by a list of stakes and districts.

== See also ==
- Area (LDS Church)
- Latter Day Saint movement
- Diocese
- The Church of Jesus Christ of Latter-day Saints membership statistics
