= Farmington New Mexico Temple =

- Interactive map of Farmington New Mexico Temple
- Number: 208
- Dedication: 17 August 2025, by Neil L. Andersen
- Site: 6.63 acres (2.68 ha)
- Floor area: 29,066 ft^{2} (2,700.3 m^{2})
- Official website • News & images

Church chronology
← Antofagasta Chile Temple	Farmington New Mexico Temple	→ Elko Nevada Temple

Additional information
- Announced: April 4, 2021, by Russell M. Nelson
- Groundbreaking: 30 April 2022, by Anthony D. Perkins
- Open house: 17 July-2 August 2025
- Location: Farmington, New Mexico, United States
- Coordinates: 36°46′11″N 108°09′54″W
- Baptistries: 1
- Ordinance rooms: 2
- Sealing rooms: 2

The Farmington New Mexico Temple is a temple of the Church of Jesus Christ of Latter-day Saints in Farmington, New Mexico. The intent to build the temple was announced on April 4, 2021, by church president Russell M. Nelson, during general conference. It is the second in New Mexico, following the one in Albuquerque. The temple district encompasses the Four Corners region, which includes church members in parts of New Mexico, Colorado, Arizona, and the Navajo Nation.

The temple has a single central spire. A groundbreaking ceremony, to signify the beginning of construction, was held on April 30, 2022, conducted by Anthony D. Perkins, a church general authority, and was attended by approximately 500 church members and community leaders. The temple was dedicated on August 17, 2025, by Neil L. Andersen, of the Quorum of the Twelve Apostles.

== History ==
The temple was announced by Russell M. Nelson on April 4, 2021. The site was selected near the commercial hub of the Four Corners area, close to the merging of the Animas, San Juan, and La Plata rivers.

On June 23, 2021, the church announced that the temple would be constructed on a 6.62-acre property at the intersection of College Boulevard and Windsor Drive. A meetinghouse is also planned on the site. Preliminary plans called for a single-story structure of approximately 25,000 square feet.

Construction challenges included delays in receiving building materials. The temple was completed in the summer of 2025.

== Design and architecture ==
The building has a contemporary design, like others used for the church's temples. Its architecture reflects the cultural heritage of the Four Corners region.

The completed structure is one story tall, constructed with granite. The exterior has a multilevel tower topped with a spire, chosen for symbolic significance and alignment with temple traditions. Exterior details include carvings of linked pine needles and pinon roses (meaning a pine cone that blooms in the way that a flower or a rose does).

The interior features art-glass windows, designed to reflect the church's beliefs and the unique flora and fauna of the region. The windows depict stairways leading to heaven and include local plants such as prickly pear cactus, corn, yucca, and scarlet globe mallow. Some of the windows feature landscapes of the surrounding areas.

The temple has two Ordinance rooms, two sealing rooms, and a baptistry.

The design uses symbolic elements representing Latter-day Saint beliefs, providing spiritual meaning to the temple's appearance and function. The linked pine needle design on its exterior symbolizes the role of temple ordinances in Latter-day Saint doctrine to link families together for eternity. Additionally, the interior art-glass windows portray pinon roses in circles, representing eternity with a design that has no beginning and no end.

== Community impact ==
Construction of the temple has had a role in creating a sense of community and promoting mutual understanding among residents of diverse backgrounds in the area. Leaders of other local faiths expressed that while they had initially had reservations about the size of the construction, they were impressed by the church’s respect for and willingness to work with the local community.

Additionally, the temple's presence has contributed to the local economy, as construction has created new jobs. Farmington Mayor Nate Duckett noted that there were “more than a dozen local subcontractors working on the build.”

== Admittance ==
After completion, a two-week public open house was held.

Like all the church's temples, it is not used for Sunday worship services. To members of the church, temples are regarded as sacred houses of the Lord. Once dedicated, only church members with a current temple recommend can enter for worship.

== See also ==
- Comparison of temples of The Church of Jesus Christ of Latter-day Saints
- List of temples of The Church of Jesus Christ of Latter-day Saints
- List of temples of The Church of Jesus Christ of Latter-day Saints by geographic region
- Temple architecture (Latter-day Saints)
- The Church of Jesus Christ of Latter-day Saints in New Mexico
