= Tijuana Mexico Temple =

Latter-day Saint temple in Baja California, Mexico

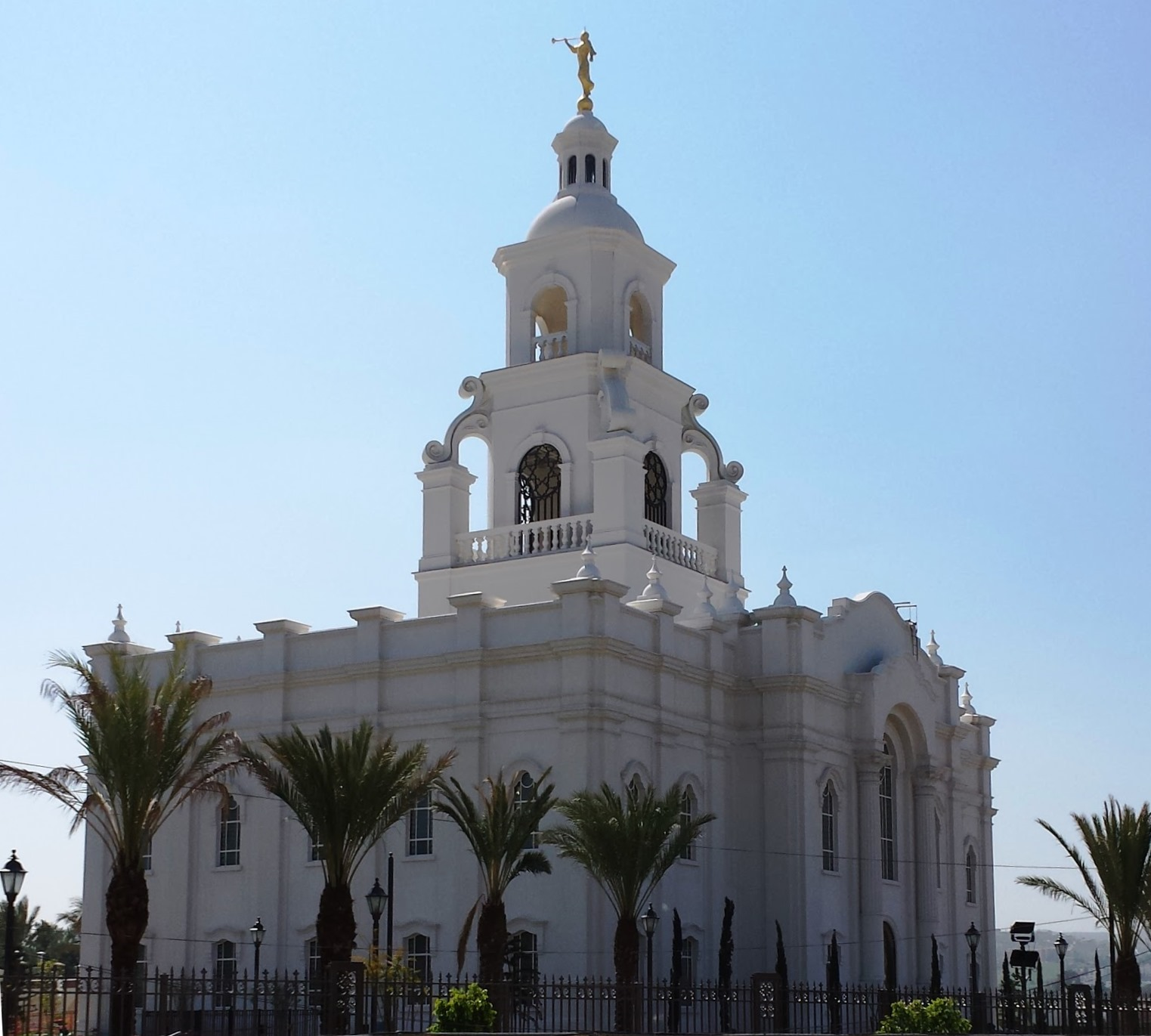
- Interactive map of Tijuana Mexico Temple
- Number: 149
- Dedication: 13 December 2015, by Dieter F. Uchtdorf
- Site: 9.4 acres (3.8 ha)
- Floor area: 33,367 ft^{2} (3,099.9 m^{2})
- Height: 151 ft (46 m)
- Official website • News & images

Church chronology
← Indianapolis Indiana Temple	Tijuana Mexico Temple	→ Provo City Center Temple

Additional information
- Announced: 2 October 2010, by Thomas S. Monson
- Groundbreaking: 18 August 2012, by Benjamin de Hoyos
- Current president: Carlos Tom Prince
- Location: Tijuana, Mexico
- Coordinates: 32°29′20.4648″N 116°55′39.198″W
- Exterior finish: Precast concrete cladding
- Baptistries: 1
- Ordinance rooms: 2 (two-stage progressive)
- Sealing rooms: 2
- Notes: A public open house was held from Friday, 13 November 2015, through Saturday, 28 November 2015.

The Tijuana Mexico Temple is a temple of the Church of Jesus Christ of Latter-day Saints, located in Tijuana, Baja California, Mexico. Announced on October 2, 2010, by church president Thomas S. Monson during general conference, when dedicated it was the 13th in Mexico and the church's 149th operating temple worldwide. Designed by Cooper Roberts Simonsen & Associates (CRSA), the building uses Spanish Colonial Revival architecture, with design elements including arched entryways and motifs reflecting regional flora, including bougainvillea.

The temple is on a 9.4-acre site beneath Tijuana’s Cerro Colorado and has landscaped courtyards, tiered fountains, and palm trees. A groundbreaking ceremony was held on August 18, 2012, presided over by Benjamín De Hoyos, a church general authority. The building has two ordinance rooms, two sealing rooms, and a baptistry. At the time of its dedication, it served approximately 45,000 Latter-day Saints in the surrounding area.

After construction was completed, more than 71,000 visitors toured the building during a public open house. The temple was dedicated on December 13, 2015, by Dieter F. Uchtdorf, second counselor in the First Presidency. The temple received praise from civic leaders for its contribution to the city's image and was recognized with prestigious architectural awards, including the PCI Design Award and the Sidney Freedman Craftsmanship Award.

== History ==
The Tijuana Mexico Temple was announced by church president Thomas S. Monson on October 2, 2010, during general conference. A 9.4‑acre (3.8 ha) property in southeastern Tijuana, near Cerro Colorado, in Mexico was selected as the site. Plans called for a structure of 33,367 square feet.

The groundbreaking ceremony took place on August 18, 2012, marking the commencement of construction, with Benjamín De Hoyos, first counselor in the presidency of the Mexico Area, presiding. It was attended by approximately 2,000 local church members and community leaders, and was also broadcast via satellite throughout the temple district.

The design uses Spanish Colonial Revival architectural elements, influenced by historic missions such as San Xavier del Bac, reflecting the cultural heritage of the region.

As of 2015, the temple was expected to serve about 45,000 Latter-day Saints in northern Baja California and parts of Sonora, areas previously served by temples in San Diego and Hermosillo.

Following completion of construction, the church announced the public open house that was held from November 13–28, 2015, excluding Sundays. During the open house, approximately 71,000 people visited the temple.

The Tijuana Mexico Temple was dedicated on December 13, 2015 by Dieter F. Uchtdorf, second counselor in the First Presidency. The dedication was held in three sessions and broadcast throughout Mexico. President Uchtdorf described the temple as a "lighthouse" for the region. As of 2015, the temple was expected to serve about 45,000 Latter-day Saints in northern Baja California and parts of Sonora, areas previously served by temples in San Diego and Hermosillo.

In 2020, along with all the church's others, the Tijuana Mexico Temple was closed for a time due to the COVID-19 pandemic.

== Design and architecture ==
The Tijuana Mexico Temple was designed by CRSA, with Haskell Construction serving as the general contractor. The temple went through the design process three times. Its design is heavily influenced by Spanish Colonial Revival architecture, intentionally referencing the feel of historic Mexican missions through its white stucco appearance, ornamental arches, and courtyard layout.

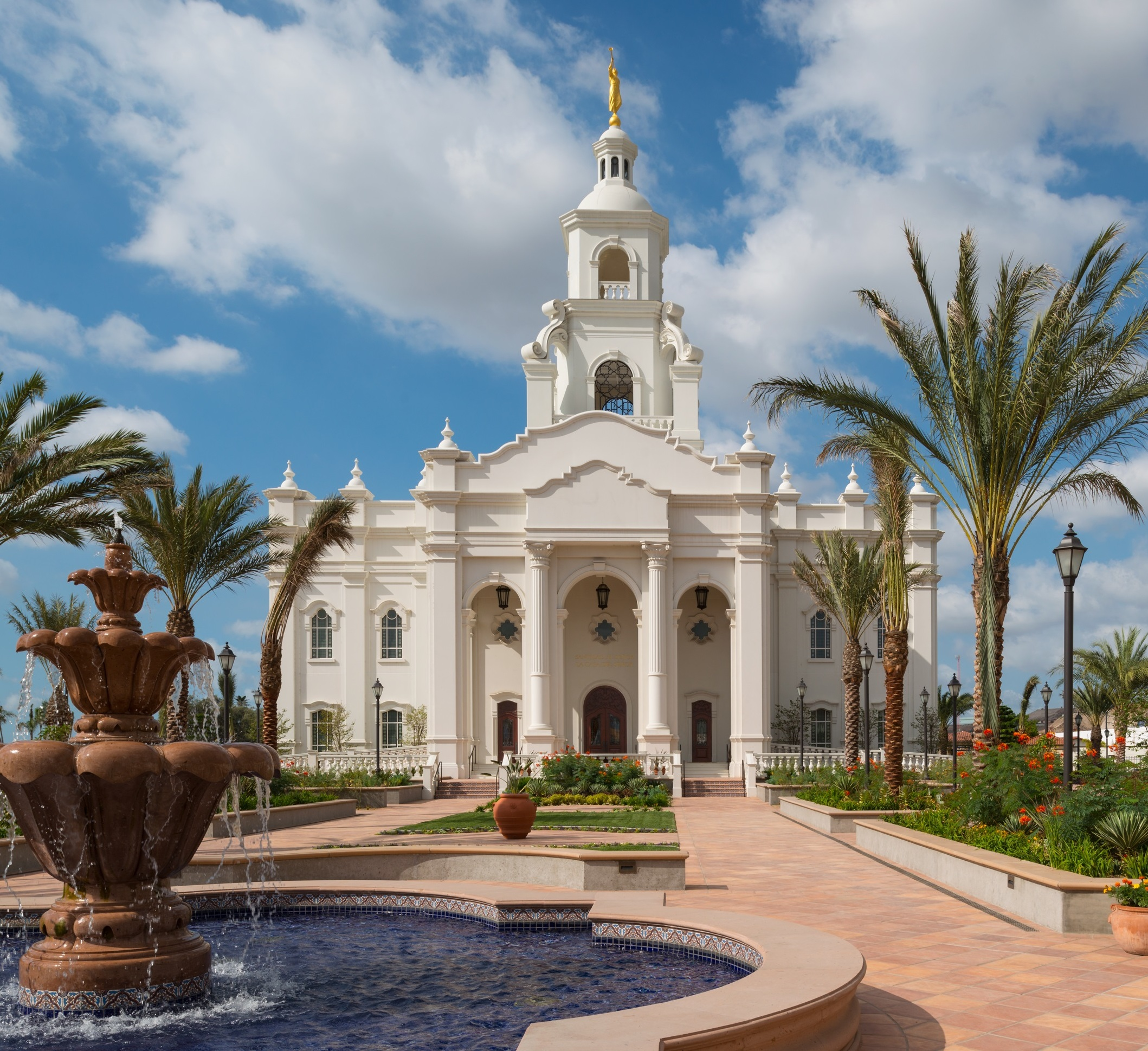
Front Elevation of the Tijuana Mexico Temple

The temple is on a 9.4-acre site that includes formal courtyards, a tiered fountain, palm trees, and plantings of native Mexican flora accented by bougainvillea motifs. The structure is 33,367 sq ft, and its tallest point, a central tower with the angel Moroni statue, reaches approximately 151 ft, including the statue. Without the spire, the building is 48 feet tall. The exterior is constructed of 285 precast concrete panels and 80 GFRC panels, designed to replicate traditional stucco while providing structural longevity. The main entrance features three two-story arches, sculptural scrollwork at the spire's base, and cantera stone detailing.

The interior has marble staircases, wrought-iron railings, dark wooden doors, stone flooring, crystal chandeliers, and bronze and glass lighting fixtures inspired by Mexican Colonial design traditions. Instruction rooms showcase murals depicting the Baja California desert and coastline, along with carved/frosted glass elements for natural light.

Life size paintings of Jesus Christ line the hallways, each leading to a different room.

The celestial room is considered to be the most sacred space in the temple, and symbolizes returning to heaven, with white walls trimmed with gold. In describing the celestial room, the LA Times said that an "inexplicable serenity lingers (there)."

The temple has two ordinance rooms, two sealing rooms, and one baptistry. Symbolic references to regional flora (especially bougainvillea) appear in floors, paintings, and rails as a motif, while the gold-leafed angel Moroni statue on the spire represents the restoration of the gospel.

Precast concrete with GFRC allowed capture of the building's complex details. Precision CNC-formed molds were utilized to design the scroll features and arches, and an exterior-only panel mounting system was devised to avoid interior attachment holes—allowing the construction team to begin work on the interior faster—reducing onsite labor and accelerating construction.

== Cultural and community impact ==
Since its dedication, the temple has played a visible role in the Tijuana community. The Church News reports that local officials, including the first lady of Baja California and the mayor of Tijuana. The mayor praised the temple's contribution to the cityscape, describing it as a "living museum" that "beautifies this part of the city." After she toured the open house, the first lady wrote in a Facebook post that she was honored to share the time with church members, and learn more about their beliefs and values.

On December 12, 2015, the evening prior to the dedication, a cultural celebration titled "Venid a Mí" ("Come unto Me") was held. It featured youth from the temple district performing traditional music and dance, celebrating local history and the significance of the temple.

In 2015, the temple won a World Architecture Award for "Best International Building Structure" from the Precast Concrete Institute of America, and earned the PCI Design Award (2015) and the Sidney Freedman Craftsmanship Award (2017) for its intricate precast detailing.

According to Wallace Cooper of CRSA, church leaders wanted to create a conscientious statement through the design that told the people of Tijuana they were "incredibly important to (the) church." Church members have described how the temple brings "a special air of peace and tranquility" and alleviates the prior burden of cross-border travel for temple ordinances. The Tijuana Mexico Temple reduced extensive travel times, and although the closest temple for members previously was thirty miles to the North, due to travel restrictions at the border, many members chose instead to drive 8–10 hours to the Hermosillo Sonora Mexico Temple instead.

== Temple presidents and access ==
=== Admittance ===
A public open house was held from November 13 to 28, 2015 (excluding Sundays) prior to the temple's dedication. The temple was dedicated by Dieter F. Uchtdorf on December 13, 2015, during three sessions.

Like all the church's temples, it is not used for Sunday worship services. To members of the church, temples are regarded as sacred houses of the Lord. Once dedicated, only church members with a current temple recommend can enter for worship.

== See also ==
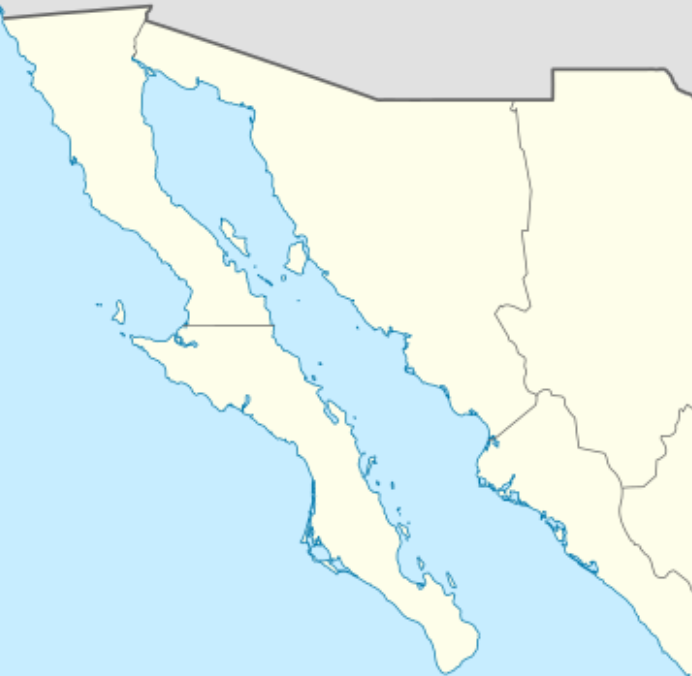

Temples in Northwestern Mexico

Northeast Mexico temples
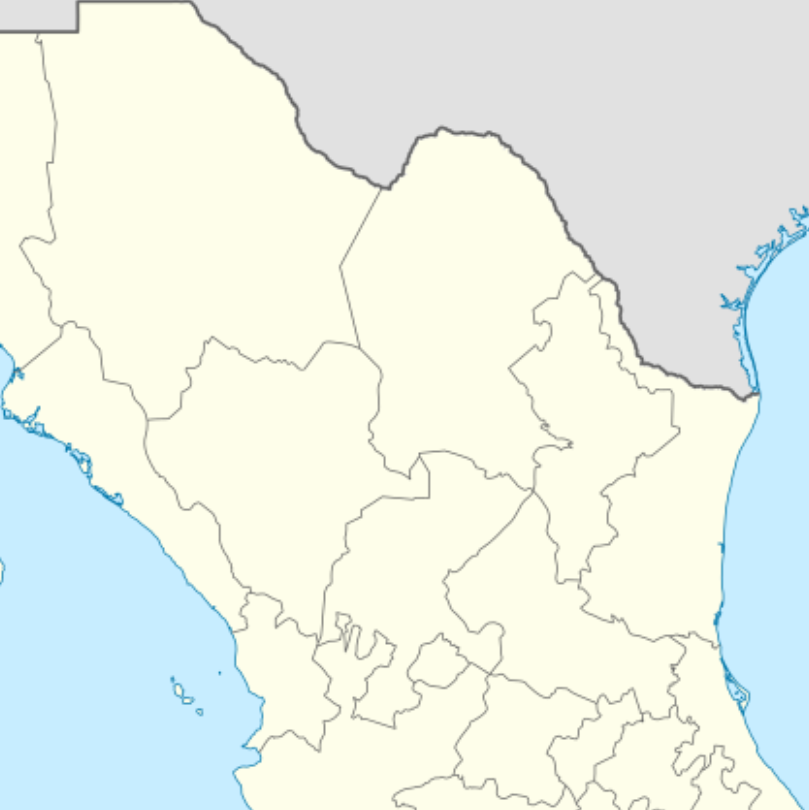
Temples in Northeastern Mexico
Central Mexico temples
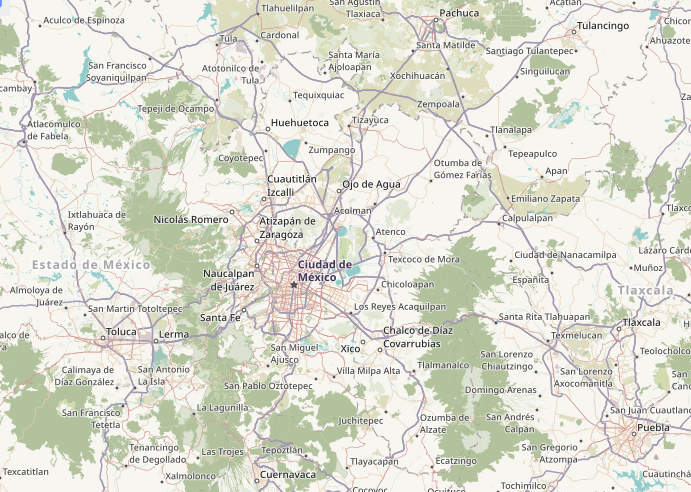
Temples in Central Mexico
Southeast Mexico temples
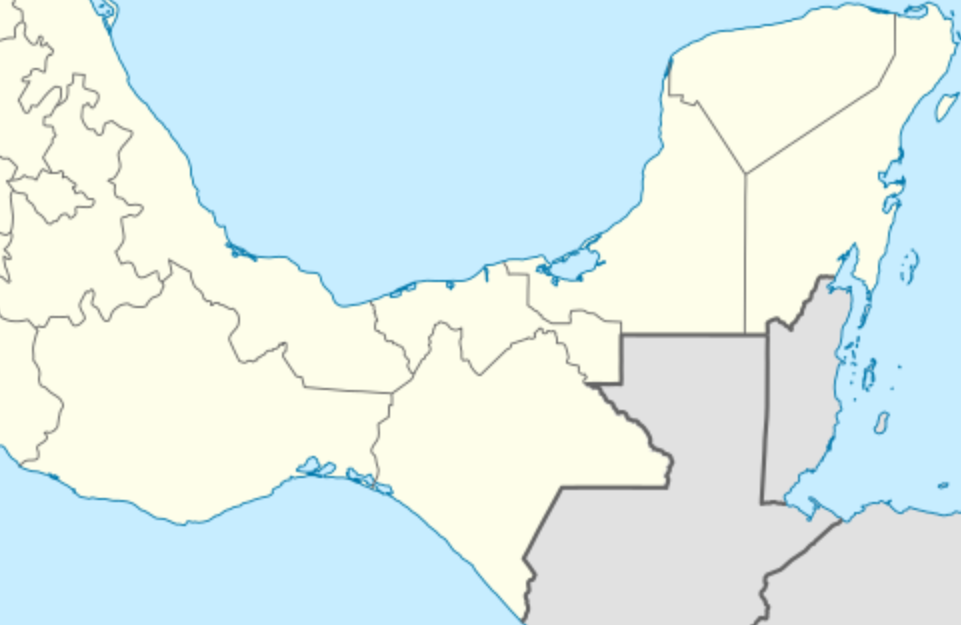
Temples in Southeast Mexico
Mexico map
Temples in Mexico

= Operating
= Under construction
= Announced
= Temporarily closed

- List of temples of The Church of Jesus Christ of Latter-day Saints
- The Church of Jesus Christ of Latter-day Saints in Mexico
