= Tuxtla Gutiérrez Mexico Temple =

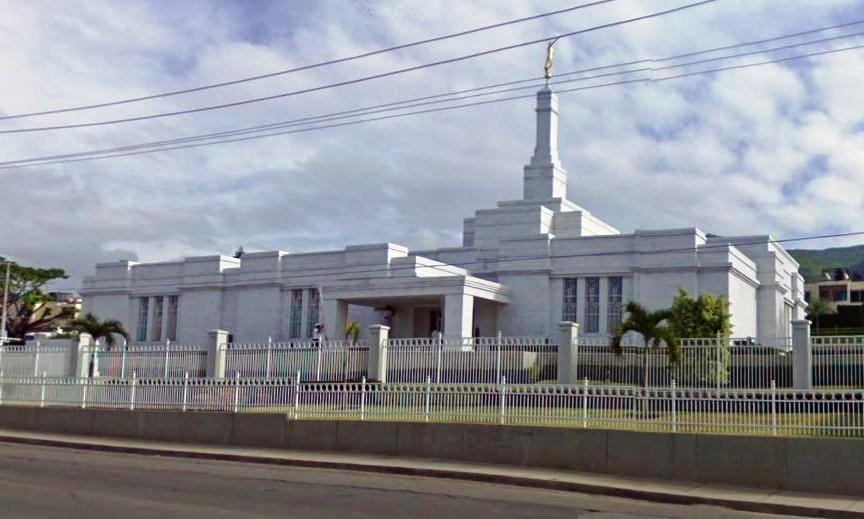
- Interactive map of Tuxtla Gutiérrez Mexico Temple
- Number: 75
- Dedication: 12 March 2000, by James E. Faust
- Site: 1.56 acres (0.63 ha)
- Floor area: 10,700 ft^{2} (990 m^{2})
- Height: 71 ft (22 m)
- Official website • News & images

Church chronology
← Oaxaca Mexico Temple	Tuxtla Gutiérrez Mexico Temple	→ Louisville Kentucky Temple

Additional information
- Announced: 25 February 1999, by Gordon B. Hinckley
- Groundbreaking: 20 March 1999, by Richard E. Turley Sr.
- Open house: 29 February – 4 March 2000
- Current president: Indalecio Tomas Morales
- Designed by: Alvaro Inigo and Church A&E Services
- Location: Tuxtla Gutiérrez, Mexico
- Coordinates: 16°45′50.99040″N 93°9′32.95799″W
- Exterior finish: White marble from Torreón, Mexico
- Design: Classic modern, single-spire design
- Baptistries: 1
- Ordinance rooms: 2 (two-stage progressive)
- Sealing rooms: 2

The Tuxtla Gutiérrez Mexico Temple is a temple of the Church of Jesus Christ of Latter-day Saints in Tuxtla Gutiérrez, Chiapas, Mexico. The intent to build the temple was announced on February 25, 1999, by the First Presidency in letters to local priesthood leaders. It is the first in the state of Chiapas, the sixth in Mexico, and the church's 102nd operating temple.

The temple has a single spire with a statue of the angel Moroni on its top and uses a classic modern design. Designed by architect Alvaro Inigo and church architectural and engineering employees, the structure has a white marble exterior from Torreón, Mexico. A groundbreaking ceremony, to signify the beginning of construction, was held on March 20, 1999, conducted by Richard E. Turley Sr., a general authority and counselor in the presidency of the Mexico South Area. The temple was dedicated by James E. Faust, second counselor in the First Presidency, on March 12, 2000, the day after Faust dedicated the Oaxaca Mexico Temple. It was the last of four temples in Mexico dedicated in a two-week period that month.

== History ==
The temple was announced by the First Presidency on February 25, 1999, in letters to local priesthood leaders, and two days after the Oaxaca Mexico Temple was announced.

Howard W. Hunter, of the Quorum of the Twelve Apostles, accompanied by Claudius Bowman, president of the Mexican Mission, dedicated the region for the preaching of the gospel in 1957 from Mactumatza, a mountain overlooking the city.

The groundbreaking ceremony took place on March 20, 1999, with 297 attendees. Richard E. Turley Sr., a General Authority Seventy and counselor in the Mexico South Area presidency, presided over the ceremony and offered the prayer. This groundbreaking was held on the same day as those for the Fresno California, Fukuoka Japan, and Melbourne Australia temples. During his remarks, Turley described the occasion as bringing "new life in the springtime" to members in the city. In his prayer, he asked that church members and leaders receive "a special strength" and develop "a culture of regular temple attendance." Among those in attendance were presidents of the three Tuxtla Gutiérrez stakes and the Arriaga District, along with many three-generation church members. The evening before the groundbreaking, a new stake center on the property's western end was dedicated, with the temple planned for construction on the eastern portion.

Project managers Bryan Hutchings and John Webster, along with Impulsa and Okland Construction Company serving as contractors, directed the construction. The temple was completed in less than one year after construction began. After construction was completed, a public open house was held from February 29 to March 4, 2000, with 6,082 visitors touring the temple.

James E. Faust, second counselor in the First Presidency, dedicated the temple in four sessions on March 12, 2000, with 3,316 church members attending. Faust was accompanied by Richard G. Scott, of the Quorum of the Twelve Apostles, and Carl B. Pratt, a general authority and president of the Mexico South Area. A choir from Tapachula, an area near the Guatemalan border, performed at the dedication. Many of the choir members had prepared in 1997 for a visit from church president Gordon B. Hinckley that was cancelled due to a hurricane. They sang at the temple dedication under the direction of Lelia Esten Magro de Cruz.

Following the dedication, Jorge Antonio Feliciano of the Cordoba Ward, Tapachula Mexico Izapa Stake, remarked, "This is the first time I have seen a temple. I have never seen anything like it." By early 2001, more than 200 members had received temple ordinances since the dedication, and many families had been sealed. At the time of its dedication, the temple served church members in five stakes and one district in Chiapas, near the border of Guatemala.

In 2020, like all the church's others, the Tuxtla Gutiérrez Mexico Temple was closed for a time in response to the COVID-19 pandemic.

== Design and architecture ==
The temple is on a 1.56-acre plot next to a meetinghouse. The site is located at Carretera a Chicoasén Kilometro 1.4 Esquina Paseo de la Roseta, Fraccionamiento San José Chapultepec. The temple sits on a hillside overlooking the city, with views across the valley to Mactumatza, the mountain where Howard W. Hunter dedicated the area for missionary work in 1957. Adjacent to the temple is an arrival center.

Designed by architect Alvaro Inigo and church architectural and engineering employees, the temple has a classic modern design. It is a single-story that is 77 feet by 149 feet, with a total floor area of 10,700 square feet. The exterior has white marble from Torreón, Mexico, and a single center spire with an angel Moroni statue.

The temple has a baptistry, two ordinance rooms (designed in a two-stage progressive format), and two sealing rooms.

== Temple leadership and admittance ==
The church's temples are directed by a temple president and matron, each typically serving for a term of three years. The president and matron oversee the administration of temple operations and provide guidance and training for both temple patrons and staff. Serving from 2000 to 2003, Enrique S. Casillas was the first president, with María E. de Sánchez serving as matron. As of 2023, Edgar Flores Prieto is the president, with Gabriela A. de Flores serving as matron.

=== Admittance ===
After construction was completed, the church announced the public open house that was held from February 29 to March 4, 2000. Like all the church's temples, it is not used for Sunday worship services. To members of the church, temples are regarded as sacred houses of the Lord. Once dedicated, only church members with a current temple recommend can enter for worship.

== See also ==
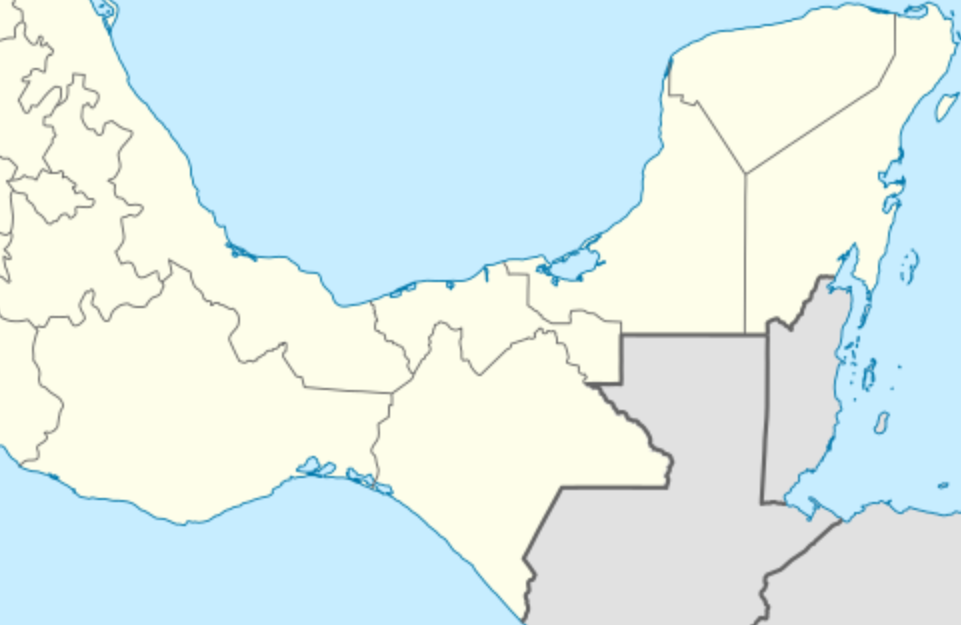

Temples in Southeast Mexico

Northwestern Mexico Temples
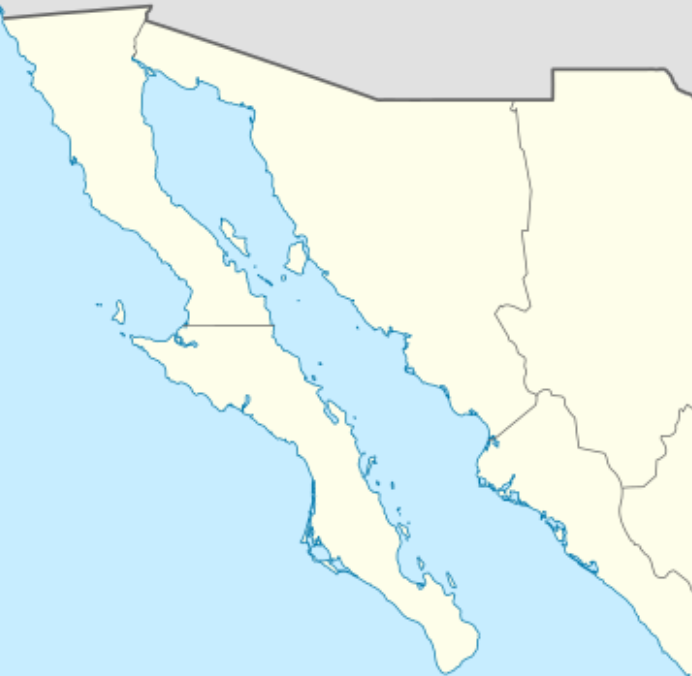
Temples in Northwestern Mexico
Northeastern Mexico Temples
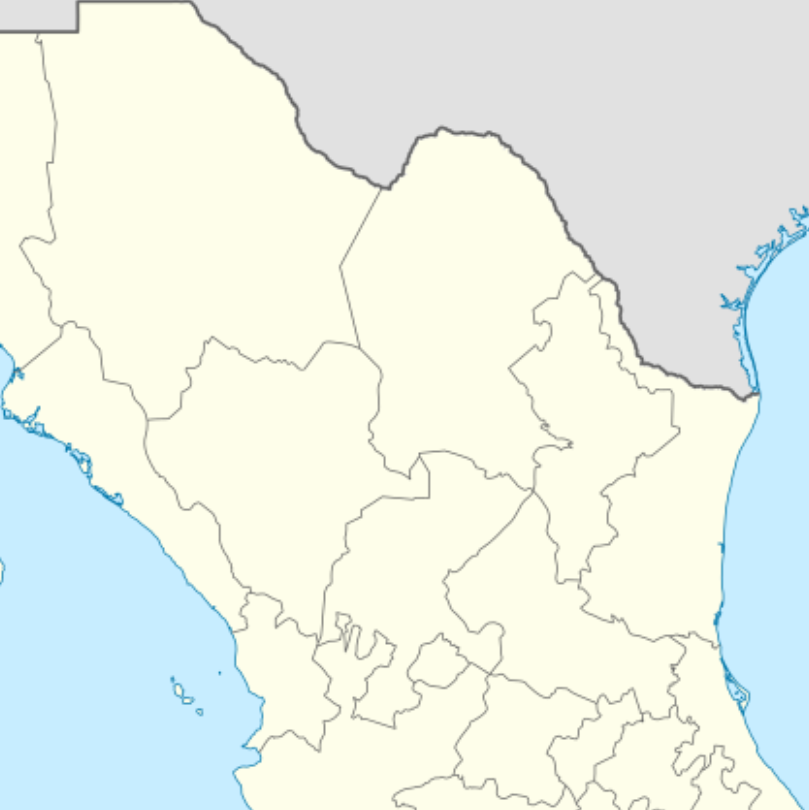
Temples in Northeastern Mexico
Central Mexico Temples
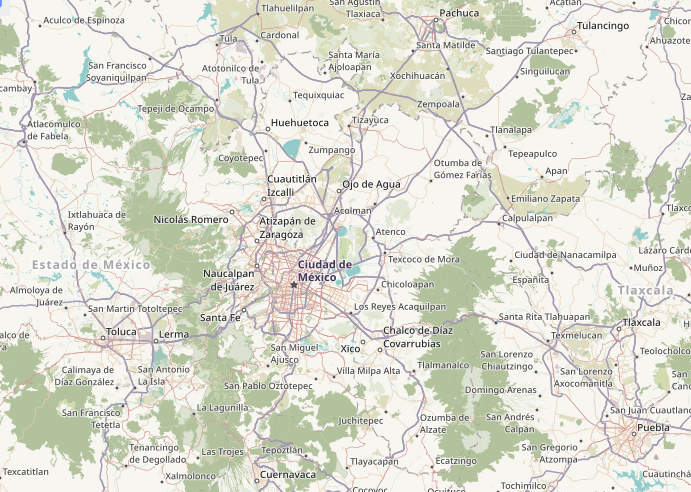
Temples in Central Mexico
Mexico Map
Temples in Mexico

= Operating
= Under construction
= Announced
= Temporarily Closed

- Comparison of temples of The Church of Jesus Christ of Latter-day Saints
- List of temples of The Church of Jesus Christ of Latter-day Saints
- List of temples of The Church of Jesus Christ of Latter-day Saints by geographic region
- Temple architecture (Latter-day Saints)
- The Church of Jesus Christ of Latter-day Saints in Mexico

== Additional reading ==
- Hart, John L. (Jan 13, 2001), "Temple blesses distant corner of rural Mexico", Church News
- "Missionary moments: Tzotzil see progress", Church News, Dec 9, 2011
