= The Church of Jesus Christ of Latter-day Saints in New Mexico =

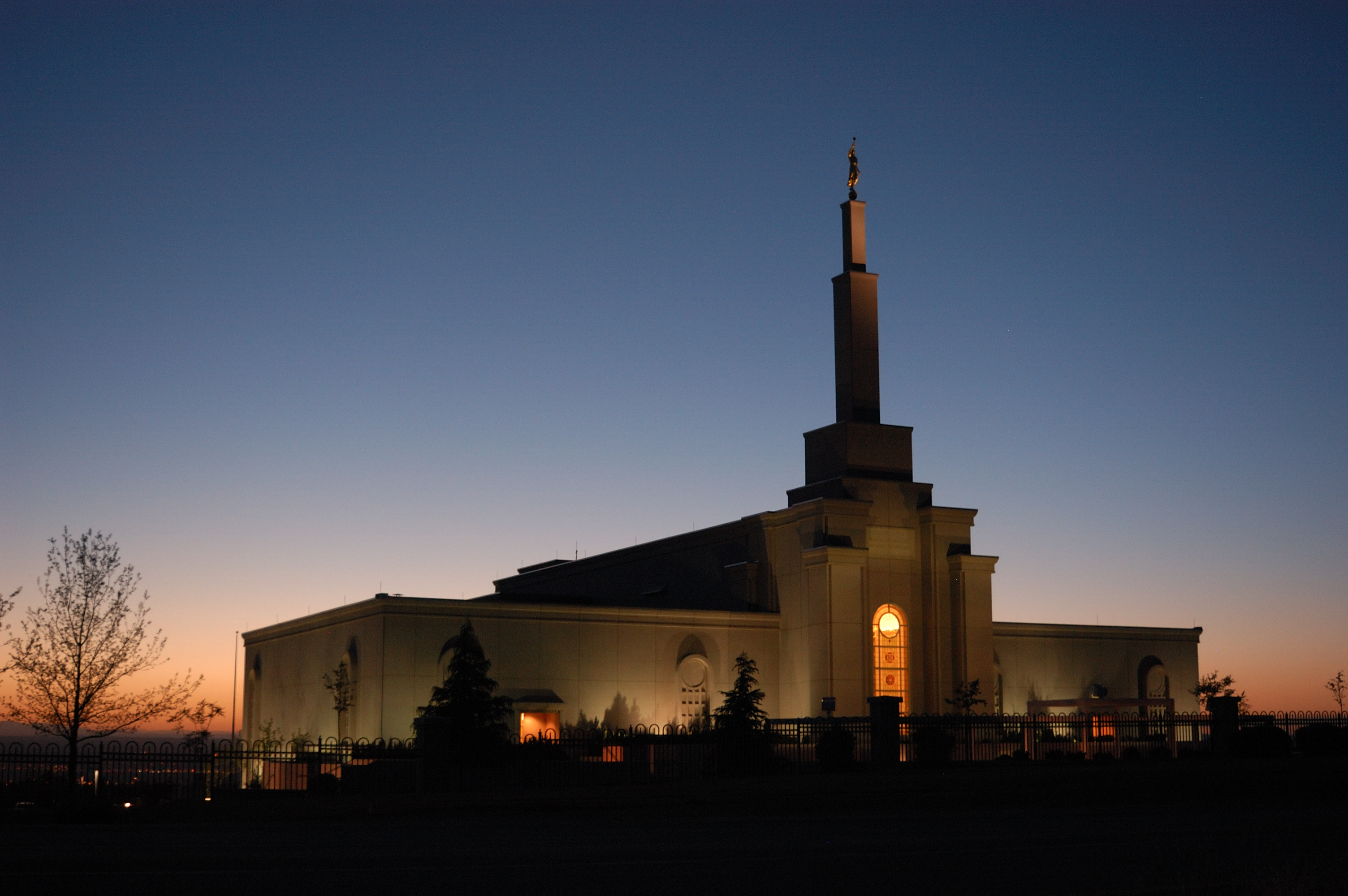
- The Albuquerque New Mexico Temple
- Area: US Southwest
- Members: 68,699 (2025)
- Stakes: 14
- Wards: 104
- Branches: 33
- Total Congregations: 137
- Missions: 2
- Temples: 2
- FamilySearch Centers: 31

The Church of Jesus Christ of Latter-day Saints in New Mexico refers to the Church of Jesus Christ of Latter-day Saints (LDS Church) and its members in New Mexico. The first congregation of the Church in New Mexico was organized in 1895. It has since grown to 68,699 members in 137 congregations.

Official church membership as a percentage of general population was 3.34% in 2014. According to the 2014 Pew Forum on Religion & Public Life survey, 1% of New Mexicans self-identify themselves most closely with The Church of Jesus Christ of Latter-day Saints. 2% of those surveyed in New Mexico in this survey considered identified themselves as Mormon. The LDS Church is the 3rd largest denomination in New Mexico.

Stakes are located in Albuquerque (4), Bloomfield, Farmington, Gallup, Kirtland, Las Cruces, Los Lunas, Rio Rancho, Roswell, Santa Fe, and Silver City.

== History ==
Membership in New Mexico
Year	Members
1920	1,313
1930	2,096
1940	3,313
1950	5,557
1960	13,363
1970	21,873
1980	36,881
1990*	48,000
1999	57,807
2009	64,872
2019	69,488
2025	68,699
*Membership was published as an estimated or rounded number. Source: Windall J. Ashton; Jim M. Wall, Deseret News, various years, Church Almanac Country Information: New Mexico

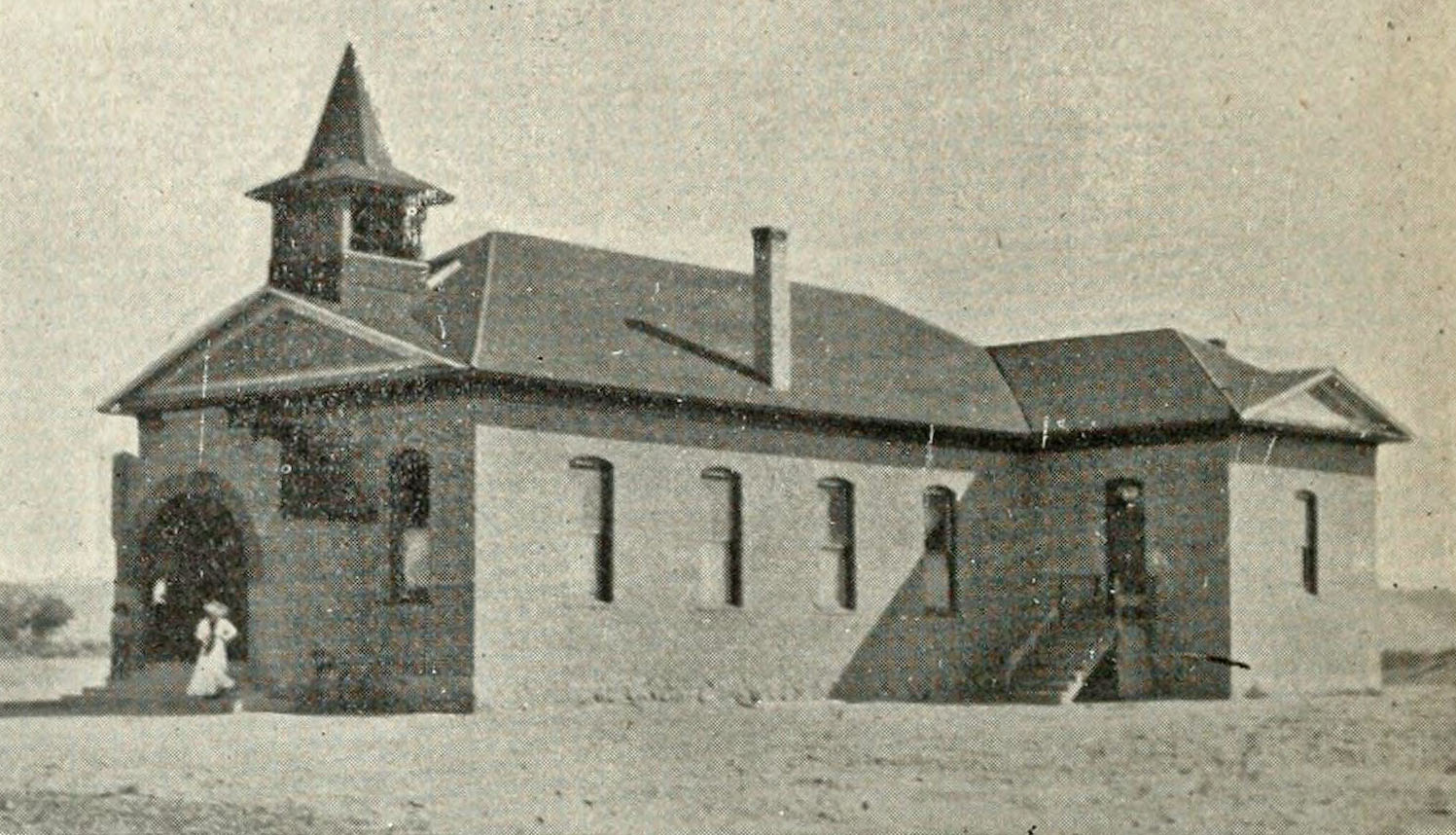
The Burnham Ward Meetinghouse in Kirtland, New Mexico

Mormons first came to New Mexico in 1846. The LDS Church has traditionally had a strong presence in the Four Corners Region of New Mexico, settling the town of Kirtland and other surrounding areas. Mormons found converts among the Zuni Indians.

== County Statistics ==
List of LDS Church adherents in each county as of 2010 according to the Association of Religion Data Archives: Each county adherent count reflects meetinghouse location of congregation and not by location of residence. Census count reflects location of residence which may skew percent of population where adherents reside in a different county as their congregational meetinghouse.

County	Congregations	Adherents	% of Population
Bernalillo	25	14,184	2.14
Catron	2	347	9.32
Chaves	3	1,351	2.06
Cibola	3	1,219	4.48
Colfax	1	461	3.35
Curry	1	912	1.89
De Baca	1	47	2.32
Eddy	3	1,457	2.71
Grant	6	1,638	5.55
Guadalupe	0		
Harding	0		
Hidalgo	3	448	9.15
Lea	2	958	1.48
Lincoln	1	426	2.08
Los Alamos	2	1,011	5.63
Luna	3	914	3.64
McKinley	11	9,434	13.20
Mora	0		
Otero	3	1,426	2.24
Quay	1	263	2.91
Rio Arriba	3	765	1.90
Roosevelt	2	568	2.86
San Juan	24	14,690	11.30
San Miguel	1	258	0.88
Sandoval	9	4,143	3.15
Santa Fe	4	2,247	1.56
Sierra	1	366	3.05
Socorro	2	556	3.11
Taos	3	599	1.82
Torrance	1	421	2.57
Union	0		
Valencia	4	2,092	2.73

== Stakes ==
Stake	Organized	Mission	Temple District
Albuquerque New Mexico East	25 Sep 1966	New Mexico Albuquerque	Albuquerque New Mexico
Albuquerque New Mexico North	6 Dec 2015	New Mexico Albuquerque	Albuquerque New Mexico
Albuquerque New Mexico	27 Oct 1957	New Mexico Albuquerque	Albuquerque New Mexico
Albuquerque New Mexico West	21 May 2000	New Mexico Albuquerque	Albuquerque New Mexico
Amarillo Texas (Note: Stake located outside New Mexico with congregation(s) meeting in New Mexico)	31 May 1981	Texas Lubbock	Lubbock Texas
Bloomfield New Mexico	1 Feb 1976	New Mexico Farmington	Farmington New Mexico
Chinle Arizona	30 Sep 1990	New Mexico Farmington	Farmington New Mexico
Duncan Arizona	24 Sep 1978	Arizona Tucson	Gila Valley Arizona
Eagar Arizona	25 Jan 1987	Arizona Flagstaff	Snowflake Arizona
El Paso Texas Chamizal	17 Jan 2016	Texas El Paso	Ciudad Juárez Mexico
El Paso Texas Mount Franklin	29 Aug 1982	Texas El Paso	Ciudad Juárez Mexico
Farmington New Mexico	21 May 1912	New Mexico Farmington	Farmington New Mexico
Gallup New Mexico	16 Mar 1975	New Mexico Farmington	Farmington New Mexico
Kirtland New Mexico	19 Sep 1982	New Mexico Farmington	Farmington New Mexico
Las Cruces New Mexico	25 Aug 1974	Texas El Paso	Albuquerque New Mexico
Los Lunas New Mexico	20 Jun 1982	New Mexico Albuquerque	Albuquerque New Mexico
Lubbock Texas	26 Nov 1967	Texas Lubbock	Lubbock Texas
Lubbock Texas North	14 Sep 2014	Texas Lubbock	Lubbock Texas
Rio Rancho New Mexico	16 Jun 2007	New Mexico Albuquerque	Albuquerque New Mexico
Pueblo Colorado	3 Mar 1974	Colorado Colorado Springs	Denver Colorado
Roswell New Mexico	13 Mar 1977	Texas Lubbock	Lubbock Texas
Santa Fe New Mexico	4 Jan 1981	New Mexico Albuquerque	Albuquerque New Mexico
Silver City New Mexico	17 Apr 1983	Texas El Paso	Gila Valley Arizona

== Missions ==
On March 7, 1943, the Navajo-Zuni Mission was organized, and specialized with teaching Native Americans in their language. This was renamed the Southwest Indian Mission on January 1, 1949. It was renamed the New Mexico-Arizona Mission on October 10, 1972.

New Mexico became its own mission when the New Mexico Albuquerque Mission was organized on July 1, 1975 with Stanley D. Robers as mission president.

As of May 2025, New Mexico was home to two missions:

Mission	Organized
New Mexico Albuquerque Mission	July 1, 1975
New Mexico Farmington Mission	July 1, 2010

In addition to these missions, the Arizona Tucson Mission and the Texas Lubbock Mission covers portions of the state.

== Temples ==
Temples in and near New Mexico
- = Operating
- = Under construction
- = Announced
- = Temporarily Closed

On March 5, 2000, the Albuquerque New Mexico Temple was dedicated by church president Gordon B. Hinckley.

On April 4, 2021, church president Russell M. Nelson announced that a temple would be built in Farmington.

73. Albuquerque New Mexico Temple; Official website; News & images	
Location: Announced: Groundbreaking: Dedicated: Size: Style:	Albuquerque, New Mexico, United States; April 4, 1997 by Gordon B. Hinckley; June 20, 1998 by Lynn A. Mickelsen; March 5, 2000 by Gordon B. Hinckley; 34,245 sq ft (3,181.5 m^{2}) on a 8.5-acre (3.4 ha) site Classic modern, single-spire design - designed by Fanning Bard & Tatum
208. Farmington New Mexico Temple; Official website; News & images	
Location: Announced: Groundbreaking: Dedicated: Size:	Farmington, New Mexico, United States; April 4, 2021 by Russell M. Nelson; 30 April 2022 by Anthony D. Perkins; 17 August 2025 by Neil L. Andersen; 29,066 sq ft (2,700.3 m^{2}) on a 6.63-acre (2.68 ha) site

== Communities ==
Latter-day Saints had a significant role in establishing and settling communities within the "Mormon Corridor", including the following in New Mexico:

- Carson
- Fruitland
- Kirtland
- Luna
- Pleasanton
- Ramah
- Virden
- Waterflow

== See also ==
- The Church of Jesus Christ of Latter-day Saints membership statistics (United States)
- New Mexico: Religion
- Mormon Battalion
