= The Church of Jesus Christ of Latter-day Saints in Indiana =

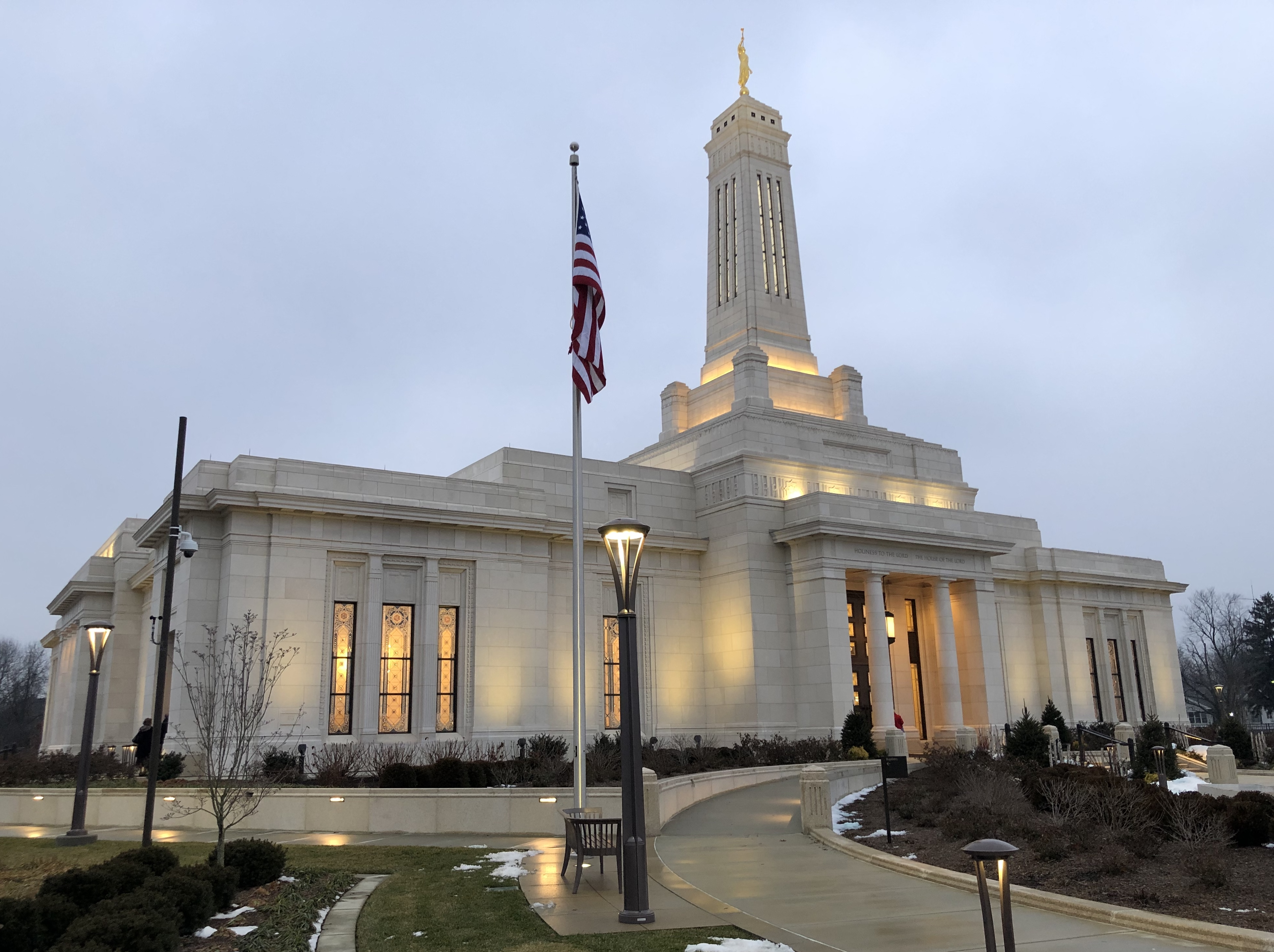
- The Indianapolis Indiana Temple
- Area: US Northeast
- Members: 48,878 (2025)
- Stakes: 13
- Wards: 80
- Branches: 22
- Total Congregations: 102
- Missions: 1
- Temples: 1
- FamilySearch Centers: 40

The Church of Jesus Christ of Latter-day Saints has had a presence in the state of Indiana since 1831. The official church membership as a percentage of general population was 0.68% in 2018. According to the 2014 Pew Forum on Religion & Public Life survey, roughly 1% of Hoosiers self-identify themselves most closely with The Church of Jesus Christ of Latter-day Saints. The LDS Church is the 13th largest denomination in Indiana.

== History ==
Membership in Indiana
Year	Membership
1983	17,729
1989*	25,000
1999	33,058
2009	40,529
2019	45,952
2025	48,878
*Membership was published as a rounded number. Source: Wendall J. Ashton; Jim M. Wall, Deseret News, various years, Church Almanac State Information: Indiana

In 1831, the first missionaries arrived in Indiana preaching in Madison, Unionville, and Vienna and establishing small congregations. Shortly thereafter, in 1832 Joseph Smith and Newell K. Whitney visited Greenville while traveling between Kirtland, Ohio and Missouri. Small congregations, usually one or two-family gatherings, appeared in Indiana usually along the travel routes initially between Ohio and Missouri. Several prominent early members of the church with ties to Indiana joined during this time, including David W. Patten and Charles C. Rich, two early members of the Quorum of the Twelve Apostles, and John C. Bennett, who was a counselor in the First Presidency for a time in Nauvoo, Illinois. The most significant journey of church members through the state during the 1830s occurred in 1834, when several hundred men traveled towards Missouri from Kirtland, Ohio as a part of Zion's Camp. Following the succession crisis of church leadership in Nauvoo, Illinois in 1844 and the subsequent removal of the church to the Rocky Mountains, missionary work in Indiana greatly decreased, and any remaining members of the church in the state were increasingly isolated.

Later, after the Mormon exodus to the Rocky Mountains, several small branches were organized along the routes taken by Latter-day Saint missionaries traveling between Utah and the eastern states. In 1882, Indiana became a part of the Northern States Mission, having no permanent church missionary presence prior to that time. The first chapel was built in 1898 in Greene County for the Robison Branch. This building later fell into disuse. Between the 1890s and for the next several decades there were approximately twenty missionaries serving in Indiana. Church growth during this time was relatively slow, resulting in only a dozen or so members traveling to Utah each year. In 1919, there were approximately 250 members and five branches in the state. In 1927, a modern meetinghouse was built and later dedicated by church president Heber J. Grant, while the first stake of the church was created in 1959. At the time, church membership in the state was close to 4,000. In 1949, the Great Lakes Mission created, covering Indiana, Michigan, Ohio, and West Virginia. This was later renamed the Indianapolis Indiana Mission in 1974. By 1988, church membership had grown to approximately 25,000, with eight stakes in the state.

In 2016, a new 17,000-square-foot meetinghouse for the Columbus' Fourth Ward was dedicated in Columbus, Indiana. As of 2022, there are 12 stakes in Indiana, four of which are in the Indianapolis metropolitan area.

== Stakes ==
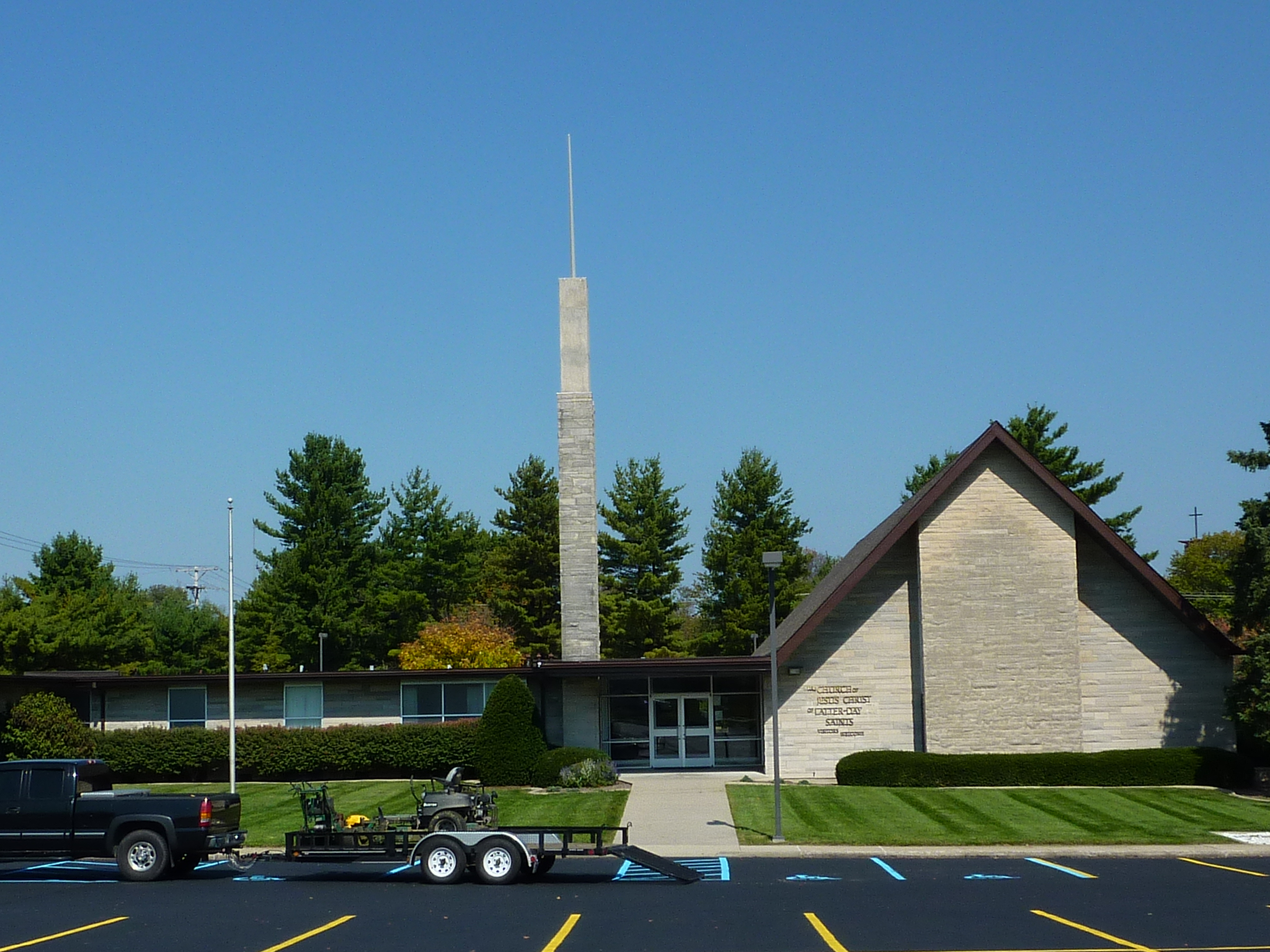
A meetinghouse of The Church of Jesus Christ of Latter-day Saints in Bloomington

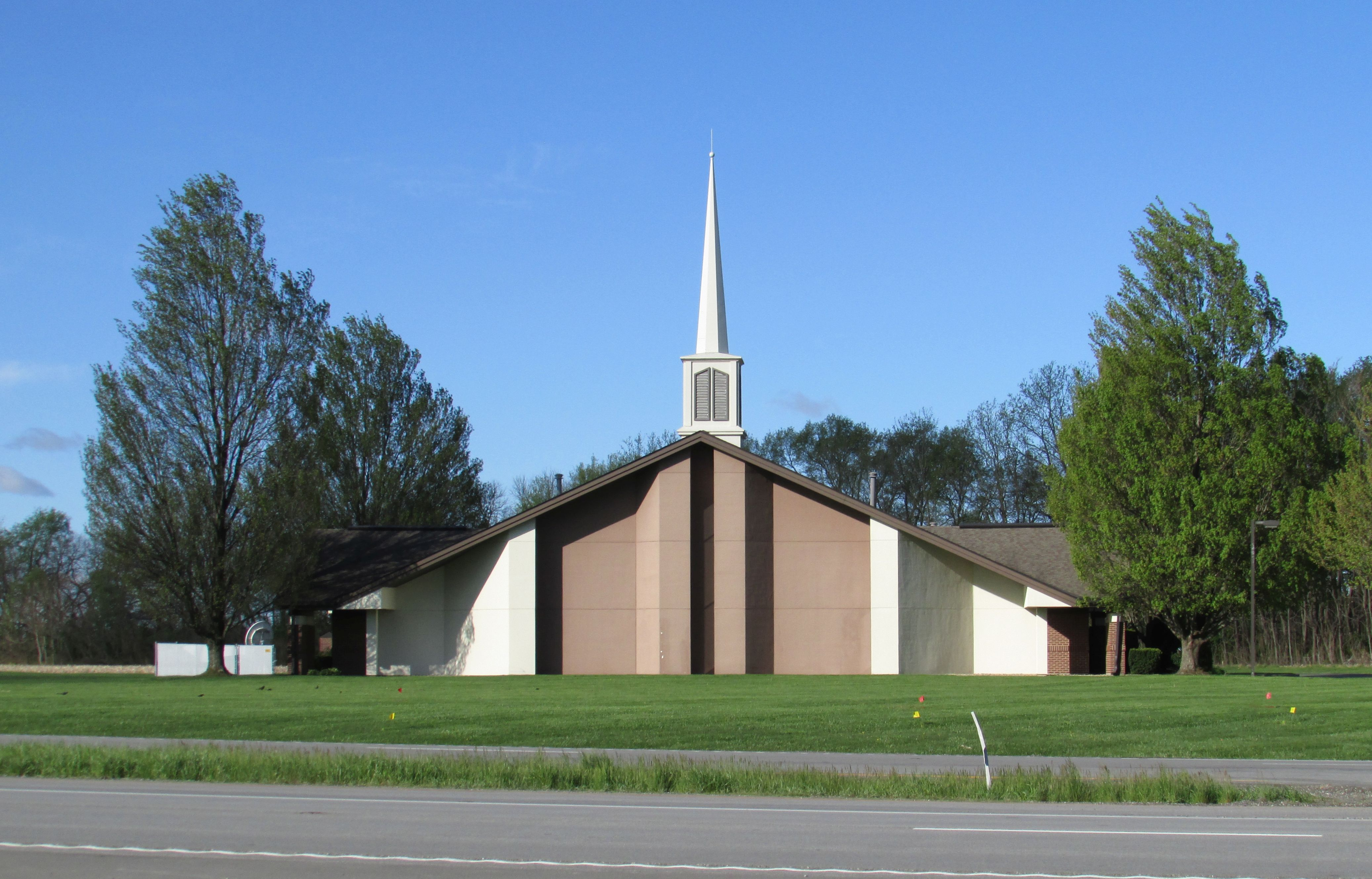
Meetinghouse in LaPorte, Indiana

As of July 2026, the following stakes had congregations located in Indiana:

Stake	Organized	Mission	Temple District
Bloomington Indiana	4 Nov 1979	Indiana Indianapolis	Indianapolis Indiana
Columbus Indiana	2 June 2024	Indiana Indianapolis	Indianapolis Indiana
Evansville Indiana	19 Oct 1975	Kentucky Louisville	Louisville Kentucky
Fishers Indiana	11 Apr 2021	Indiana Indianapolis	Indianapolis Indiana
Fort Wayne Indiana	4 Mar 1962	Indiana Fort Wayne	Indianapolis Indiana
Indianapolis Indiana	17 May 1959	Indiana Indianapolis	Indianapolis Indiana
Indianapolis Indiana North	19 Aug 1973	Indiana Indianapolis	Indianapolis Indiana
Indianapolis Indiana West	11 Nov 2007	Indiana Indianapolis	Indianapolis Indiana
Lafayette Indiana	15 May 1983	Indiana Fort Wayne	Indianapolis Indiana
Muncie Indiana	4 Feb 1996	Indiana Fort Wayne	Indianapolis Indiana
New Albany Indiana	24 Oct 1982	Kentucky Louisville	Louisville Kentucky
South Bend Indiana	30 Oct 1977	Indiana Fort Wayne	Indianapolis Indiana
Valparaiso Indiana	2 Jun 1974	Indiana Fort Wayne	Chicago Illinois

== Mission ==
Mission	Organized
Indiana Fort Wayne Mission	July 1, 2026
Indiana Indianapolis	October 31, 1949

== Temples ==
Temples in and near Indiana
- = Operating
- = Under construction
- = Announced
- = Closed for renovation

The Indianapolis Indiana Temple was announced on October 2, 2010, by President Thomas S. Monson. It is the first temple in the state and a groundbreaking ceremony was held on September 29, 2012. The temple was dedicated by Henry B. Eyring on August 23, 2015. Officials say it will serve about 30,000 members in Indiana and eastern Illinois.

148. Indianapolis Indiana Temple; Official website; News & images	
Location: Announced: Groundbreaking: Dedicated: Size: Style: Notes:	Carmel, Indiana, U.S. October 2, 2010 by Thomas S. Monson; September 29, 2012 by Donald L. Hallstrom; August 23, 2015 by Henry B. Eyring; 34,000 sq ft (3,200 m^{2}) on a 18.11-acre (7.33 ha) site Classic modern, single-spire design A public open house was held from Friday, July 17, 2015, through Saturday, August 8, 2015, excluding Sundays.

== See also ==
- The Church of Jesus Christ of Latter-day Saints membership statistics (United States)
