= Oaxaca Mexico Temple =

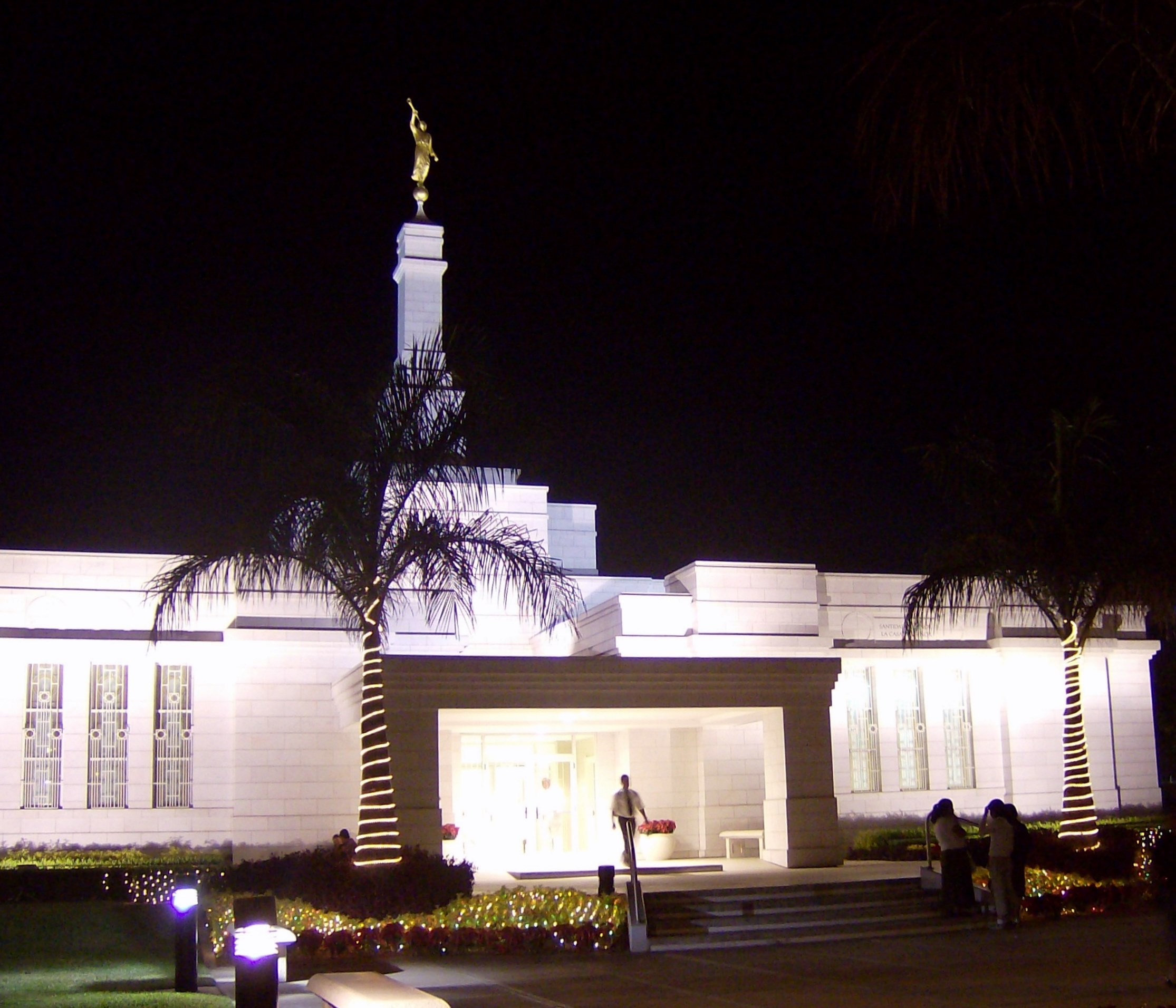
- Interactive map of Oaxaca Mexico Temple
- Number: 74
- Dedication: 11 March 2000, by James E. Faust
- Site: 1.87 acres (0.76 ha)
- Floor area: 10,700 ft^{2} (990 m^{2})
- Height: 71 ft (22 m)
- Official website • News & images

Church chronology
← Albuquerque New Mexico Temple	Oaxaca Mexico Temple	→ Tuxtla Gutiérrez Mexico Temple

Additional information
- Announced: 3 February 1999, by Gordon B. Hinckley
- Groundbreaking: 13 March 1999, by Carl B. Pratt
- Open house: 28 February – 4 March 2000
- Current president: Adán Serrano Guzmán
- Designed by: Alvaro Inigo and Church A&E Services
- Location: Oaxaca, Mexico
- Coordinates: 17°2′29.59440″N 96°42′48.61080″W
- Exterior finish: White marble from Torreón, Mexico
- Design: Classic modern, single-spire design
- Baptistries: 1
- Ordinance rooms: 2 (two-stage progressive)
- Sealing rooms: 2

The Oaxaca Mexico Temple is the 74th operating temple of the Church of Jesus Christ of Latter-day Saints. It is located in Oaxaca, and is the fifth in Mexico. The intent to construct the temple was announced by the First Presidency in a letter to local church leaders on February 23, 1999. Located on a major boulevard near a university in the Candiani sector of Oaxaca, the temple has a classic modern design with a single spire and white marble exterior.

A groundbreaking ceremony was held on March 13, 1999, conducted by Carl B. Pratt, a general authority and president of the Mexico South Area. During construction, a 7.6-magnitude earthquake struck Oaxaca on September 30, 1999, but the temple sustained no damage despite many surrounding buildings being destroyed or condemned. Reports from the project manager stated that the temple hadn’t “moved a millimeter”. The temple was completed in less than one year from the groundbreaking. James E. Faust, second counselor in the First Presidency, dedicated the temple on March 11, 2000, the first dedication he had performed.

== History ==
A long-time church member in the area recalled how the first meetinghouse in the area was built. Members were asked by local leaders to raise the goal of 6,000 pesos. To achieve, members sold televisions, watches, rings and jewelry. The member noted that one of the blessings from achieving this goal was the eventual building of a temple in Oaxaca.

The temple was announced by the First Presidency on February 23, 1999. At the time, the temple district had seven stakes and one district, with a reported 26,624 church members. This was significant for members in southern Mexico, as the Mexico City Mexico Temple, more than 225 miles away, was previously the closest. Before the temple in Oaxaca was built, members had to save and sacrifice to attend in Mexico City. A local stake president spoke of members making these sacrifices, including a young woman who sold matches, oil, and boxes to raise money for temple attendance.

The groundbreaking ceremony took place on March 13, 1999, presided over by Carl B. Pratt, of the Seventy and president of the Mexico South Area. Approximately 500 people attended the ceremony. It was held on the same day as groundbreaking ceremonies for the Kona Hawaii and Nashville Tennessee temples. In remarks at the groundbreaking, Pratt stated that in 1863 church president Brigham Young declared that the Salt Lake Temple would not be the only temple built, but there would be hundreds of temples on the earth.

During construction there was a significant natural disaster and two earthquakes. The first was a 6.5 quake in July 1999, as the footings were being installed. On September 30, 1999, as the temple's exterior walls were nearing completion, a three-minute, 7.6-magnitude earthquake struck Oaxaca. Jay Erekson, project manager for Okland Construction Company, was in front of the temple at the time and witnessed the building shake. He described the tower whipping back and forth approximately one yard and watched the windows going in and out of plumb. The earth in front of the temple appeared to rise in waves approximately eight inches high. Following the earthquake, more than 100 buildings in the city were destroyed or damaged to the degree that they were later condemned. However, when instruments were used to check every angle and line of the temple, it was discovered that “the temple had not moved a millimeter out of square or out of plumb.” Erekson said it was a miracle. The temple was said to be “perfectly square and undamaged.” The undamaged condition of the temple allowed construction to continue without delay.

Following construction, the church announced a public open house that was held February 28 to March 4, 2000. About 10,650 people attended the open house.

James E. Faust, second counselor in the First Presidency, dedicated the temple on March 11, 2000, less than a year from its groundbreaking. It was the first dedication performed by Faust, who was accompanied by his wife, Ruth, and by Richard G. Scott of the Quorum of the Twelve Apostles. Carl B. Pratt and his wife, Karen, also participated in the dedication. The dedication consisted of four sessions attended by 18,030 church members. During the cornerstone ceremony, Faust invited youth and children to take part in applying mortar to the stonework. The temple in Oaxaca was dedicated the day before the Tuxtla Gutiérrez Mexico Temple, which was also dedicated by Faust.

== Design and architecture ==
The temple is on a 1.87-acre site at a major boulevard near a university in the Fraccionamiento Real de Candiani area of Oaxaca. Trees, shrubs, and other greenery landscape the surrounding area. A meetinghouse is located adjacent to the temple property.

The building is 71 feet tall and is 77 feet by 149 feet. The exterior is white marble from Torreón, Mexico. The temple uses a classic modern design with a wide base and a single spire with a statue of the angel Moroni. The building has been described as one of the most beautiful structures in Oaxaca, a centuries-old city known throughout Mexico for its colonial architecture and religious traditions. Brigham Young University reported that Clark Hirschi, a church international area relations manager, said that both the Oaxaca Mexico and the Tuxtla Gutierrez Mexico temples are the most beautiful buildings in both communities, and that both were near main roads with several vantage points. Hirschi also described how the temples have beautiful interiors that get a feel for the customs, culture, and local people.

The temple has a total floor area of 10,700 square feet. It includes two 0rdinance rooms, two sealing rooms, and a baptistry.

The temple was designed by architect Alvaro Inigo in collaboration with church architectural employees. The contractor for the project was Impulsa/Okland Construction Company, with Jay Erekson serving as project manager.

== Temple leadership ==
The church's temples are directed by a temple president and matron, each typically serving for a term of three years. The president and matron oversee the administration of temple operations and provide guidance and training for both temple patrons and staff. Serving from 2000 to 2003, Howard G. Schmidt was the first president, with Judy Schmidt serving as matron. Schmidt was previously a sealer in the Colonia Juarez Mexico Temple before being called to be the president in Oaxaca. As of 2024, Adán Serrano Guzmán is the president, with Idalia Piñón García de Serrano serving as matron.

== Admittance ==
Following completion of construction, the church announced the public open house that was held from February 28 to March 4, 2000. Like all the church's temples, it is not used for Sunday worship services. To members of the church, temples are regarded as sacred houses of the Lord. Once dedicated, only church members with a current temple recommend can enter for worship.

== See also ==
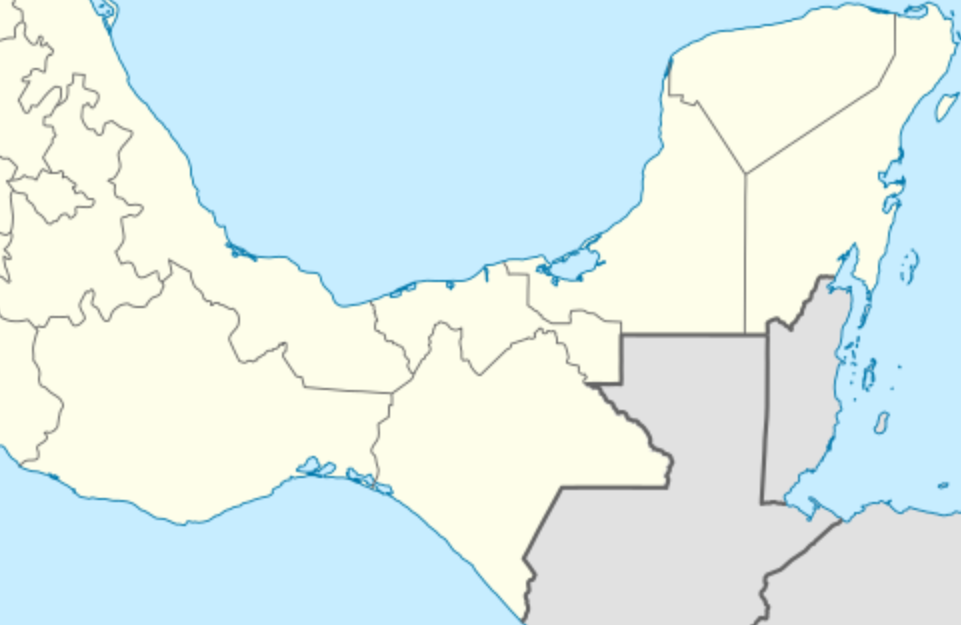

Temples in Southeast Mexico

Northwestern Mexico Temples
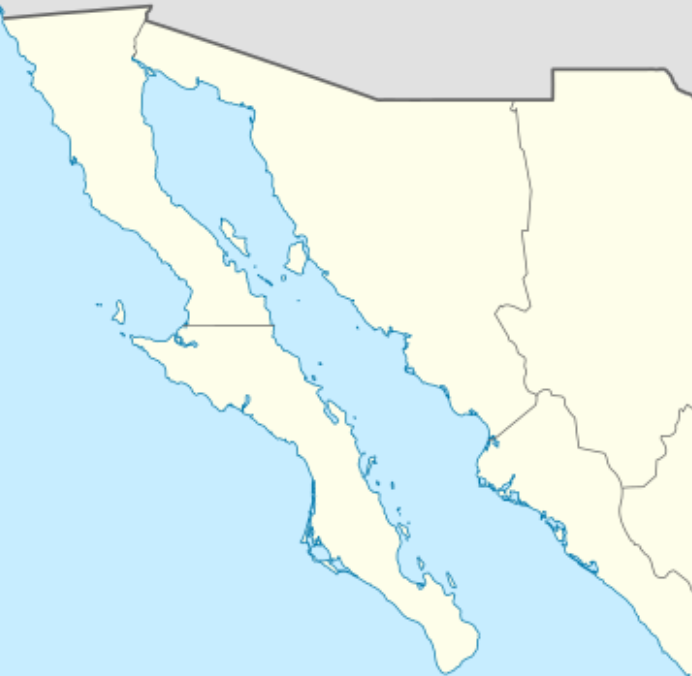
Temples in Northwestern Mexico
Northeastern Mexico Temples
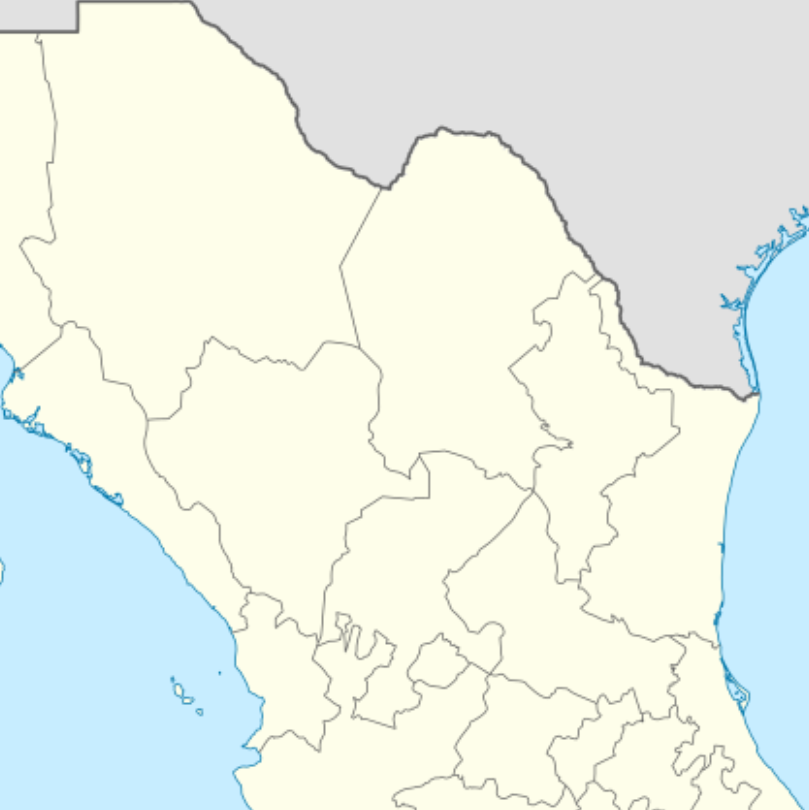
Temples in Northeastern Mexico
Central Mexico Temples
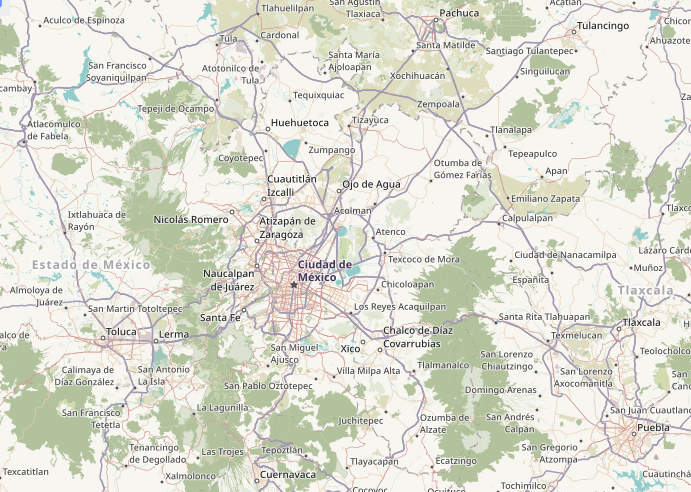
Temples in Central Mexico
Mexico Map
Temples in Mexico

= Operating
= Under construction
= Announced
= Temporarily Closed

- Comparison of temples (LDS Church)
- List of temples (LDS Church)
- List of temples by geographic region (LDS Church)
- Temple architecture (Latter-day Saints)
- The Church of Jesus Christ of Latter-day Saints in Mexico
