= Indianapolis Indiana Temple =

LDS Church temple in Carmel, Indiana, US

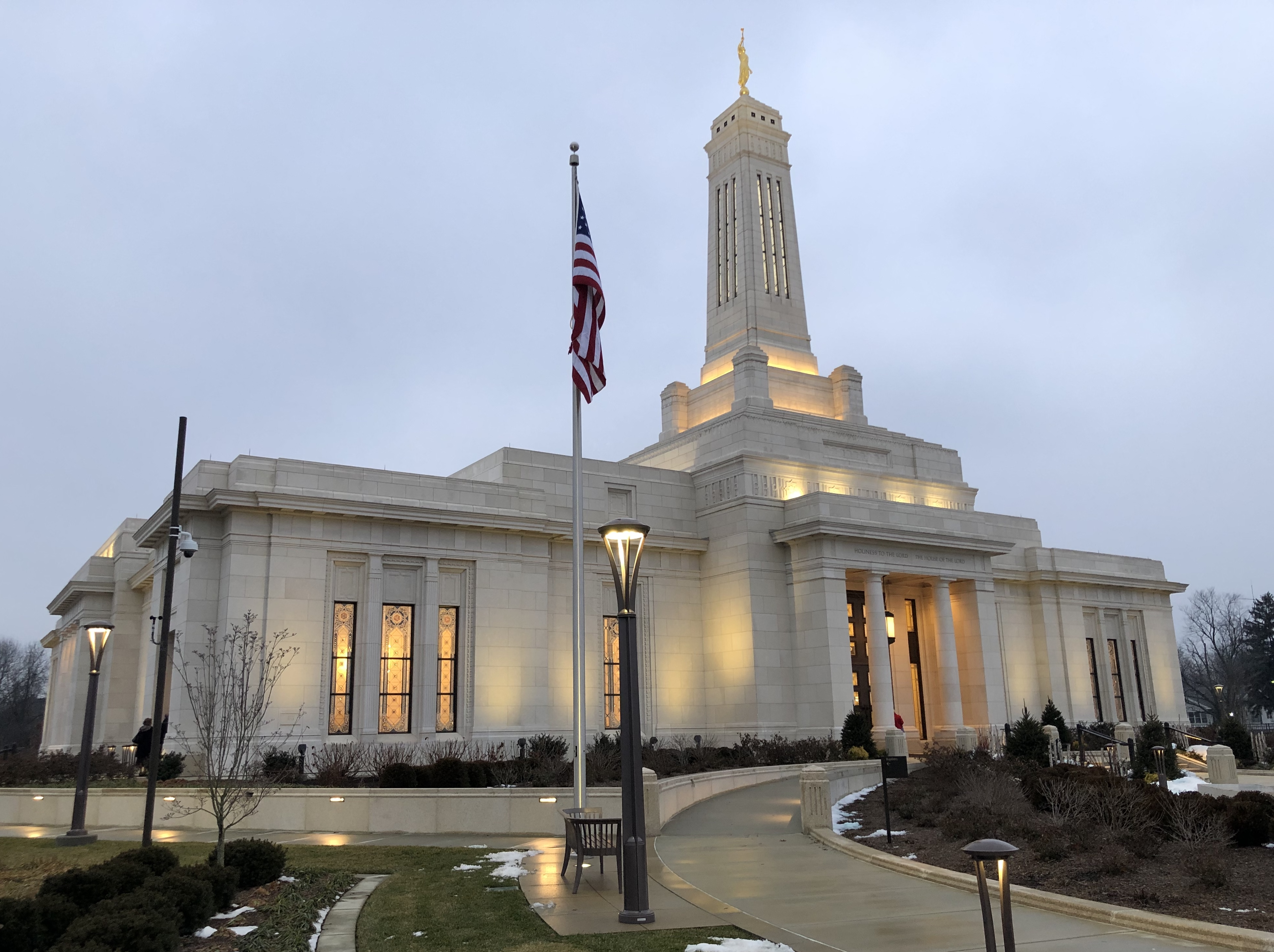
- Indianapolis Indiana Temple, 2019
- Interactive map of Indianapolis Indiana Temple
- Number: 148
- Dedication: August 23, 2015, by Henry B. Eyring
- Site: 18.11 acres (7.33 ha)
- Floor area: 34,000 ft^{2} (3,200 m^{2})
- Height: 106.3 ft (32.4 m)
- Official website • News & images

Church chronology
← Trujillo Peru Temple	Indianapolis Indiana Temple	→ Tijuana Mexico Temple

Additional information
- Announced: October 2, 2010, by Thomas S. Monson
- Groundbreaking: September 29, 2012, by Donald L. Hallstrom
- Open house: July 17-August 8, 2015
- Current president: Patrick E. Connolly
- Location: Carmel, Indiana, U.S.
- Coordinates: 39°57′20.55″N 86°9′56.39″W
- Design: Classic modern, single-spire design
- Baptistries: 1
- Ordinance rooms: 2 (two-stage progressive)
- Sealing rooms: 2
- Notes: A public open house was held from Friday, July 17, 2015, through Saturday, August 8, 2015, excluding Sundays.

The Indianapolis Indiana Temple is a temple of the Church of Jesus Christ of Latter-day Saints located at the southwest corner of West 116th Street and Spring Mill Road in Carmel, Indiana, north of Indianapolis. The temple was announced on October 2, 2010, by church president Thomas S. Monson. It is the church's first temple in Indiana, and is similar in design to The Gila Valley Arizona Temple, a single-level temple with an end spire and approximately 34,000 square feet.

The temple has a single attached end tower with a statue of the angel Moroni. A groundbreaking ceremony, to signify the beginning of construction, was held on September 29, 2012, conducted by Donald L. Hallstrom of the Presidency of the Seventy.

== History ==
The intent to build the temple was announced by church president Thomas S. Monson on October 2, 2010, during general conference. It was announced concurrently with the Hartford Connecticut, Tijuana Mexico, Urdaneta Philippines and Lisbon Portugal temples. A groundbreaking ceremony was held September 29, 2012, with Donald L. Hallstrom presiding.

After construction was completed, a public open house was held from July 17 to August 8, 2015, excluding Sundays. The temple was dedicated by Henry B. Eyring, of the church's First Presidency on August 23, 2015. At the time, church officials said it would serve about 30,000 members in Indiana and eastern Illinois.

In 2020, like all the church's others, the Indianapolis Indiana Temple was closed for a time in response to the COVID-19 pandemic.

== Design and architecture ==
The building uses a traditional Latter-day Saint temple design, with its architecture reflecting both the cultural heritage of the region and its spiritual significance to the church. The design was inspired by “some of the historically significant buildings in downtown Indianapolis.”

The temple is on an 18.11-acre plot, and the landscaping around the temple features trees, grass fields, and concrete walkways. This is designed to provide a setting that enhances its sacred atmosphere.

The structure is 106 feet tall, constructed with structural steel and concrete. The exterior has a 96-foot-tall tower, with a 7-foot statue of the angel Moroni on top. It has art glass windows with a Celtic knot pattern and floral elements.

The interior features the same art glass windows as the exterior, as well as decorative painting with the same Celtic knot and floral motifs, in a color palette of blue, gold, and green. The temple includes two instruction rooms, two sealing rooms, and a baptistry, each designed for ceremonial use.

The design has symbolic elements representing the heritage of Indiana, to provide spiritual meaning to the temple's appearance and function. Symbolism is important to church and include use of Indiana's state flower, the tulip poplar, in the art glass.

== Temple presidents ==
The church's temples are directed by a temple president and matron, each serving for a term of three years. The president and matron oversee the administration of temple operations and provide guidance and training for both temple patrons and staff.

Serving from 2015 to 2018, the first president of the Indianapolis Indiana Temple was John J. Chipman, with the matron being Karen R. Chipman. As of 2024, Patrick E. Connolly is the president, with Lisa J. Connolly serving as matron.

== Admittance ==
Following completion of construction, a public open house was held from July 17 to August 8, 2015 (excluding Sundays). The temple was dedicated by Henry B. Eyring on August 23, 2015, in three sessions.

Like all the church's temples, it is not used for Sunday worship services. To members of the church, temples are regarded as sacred houses of the Lord. Once dedicated, only church members with a current temple recommend can enter for worship.

== See also ==
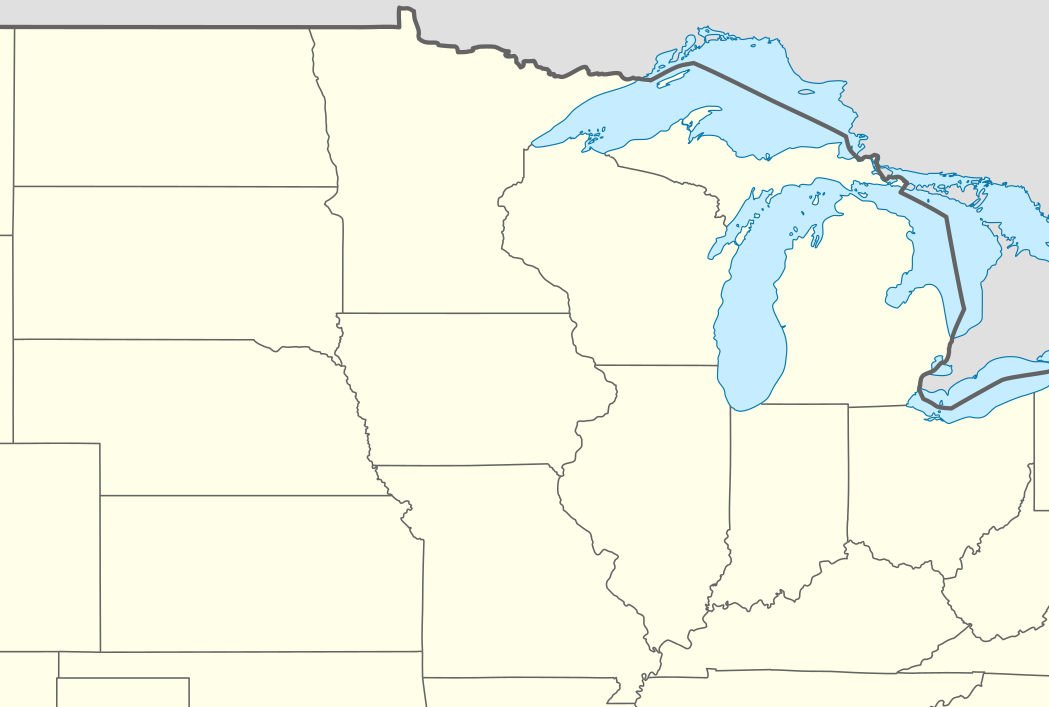
Temples in the United States Midwest
- = Operating
- = Under construction
- = Announced
- = Closed for renovation
- Comparison of temples (LDS Church)
- List of temples (LDS Church)
- List of temples by geographic region (LDS Church)
- Temple architecture (LDS Church)
- The Church of Jesus Christ of Latter-day Saints in Indiana
