= Ciudad Juárez Mexico Temple =

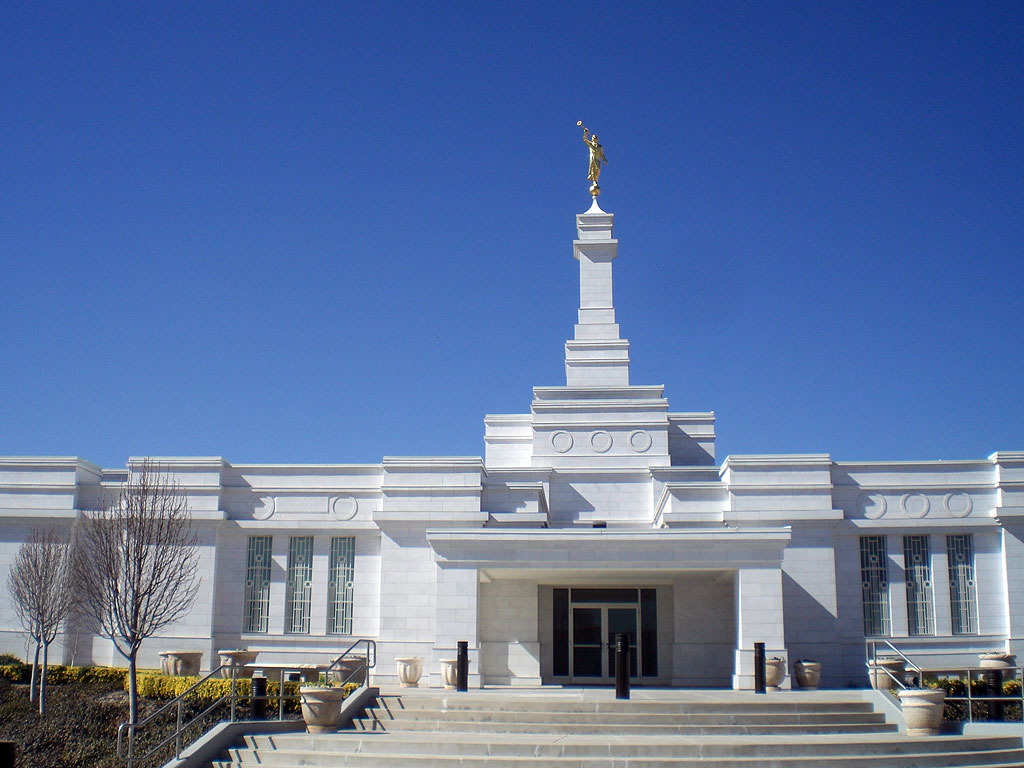
- Interactive map of Ciudad Juárez Mexico Temple
- Number: 71
- Dedication: 26 February 2000, by Gordon B. Hinckley
- Site: 1.64 acres (0.66 ha)
- Floor area: 10,700 ft^{2} (990 m^{2})
- Height: 71 ft (22 m)
- Official website • News & images

Church chronology
← Kona Hawaii Temple	Ciudad Juárez Mexico Temple	→ Hermosillo Sonora Mexico Temple

Additional information
- Announced: 7 May 1998, by Gordon B. Hinckley
- Groundbreaking: 9 January 1999, by Eran A. Call
- Open house: 12–19 February 2000
- Current president: William S. Johns
- Designed by: Alvaro Inigo and Church A&E Services
- Location: Ciudad Juárez, Mexico
- Coordinates: 31°44′10.56840″N 106°27′47.55240″W
- Exterior finish: White marble veneer
- Design: Classic modern, single-spire design
- Baptistries: 1
- Ordinance rooms: 2 (two-stage progressive)
- Sealing rooms: 2

The Ciudad Juárez Mexico Temple is a temple of the Church of Jesus Christ of Latter-day Saints in Ciudad Juárez, Chihuahua, Mexico. It was announced in a letter to local church leaders on May 7, 1998, by First Presidency, and is the church's 71st operating temple. Built on a 0.66-hectare site three kilimeters south of the U.S.–Mexico border, the 990-square-meter, single-story structure has a white marble veneer, and a central spire with an angel Moroni statue on its top.

Construction began with a groundbreaking on January 9, 1999. After construction was completed, a public open house was held from February 12 to 19, 2000, more than 25,000 visitors touring the building. The temple was dedicated by church president Gordon B. Hinckley during meetings held on February 26 and 27, 2000. Its design comes from the church’s late-1990s program for building smaller temples. It serves church members from Mexico and the United States.

== History ==
The Ciudad Juárez Mexico Temple was announced by the First Presidency on May 7, 1998. The groundbreaking took place on January 9, 1999, presided over by Eran A. Call, a general authority and president of the church's Mexico North Area. About 1,700 people, from both sides of the United States and Mexico border, attended.

The temple was built on a parcel at Calle Paraguay #290, Esquina José Borunda, Colonia Partido Romero, approximately two miles from the U.S.–Mexico border.

Preliminary plans were for a single-story, 10,700-square-foot structure finished in white marble veneer. After construction was completed, a public open house was held February 12 to 19, 2000, with approximately 25,440 visitors touring the building. It was then dedicated over six sessions held on February 26 and 27, 2000. Church president Gordon B. Hinckley offered the dedicatory prayer in the first session before traveling to Hermosillo, while Thomas S. Monson, First Counselor in the First Presidency, conducted the remaining sessions, offering the subsequent dedicatory prayers. The temple serves members in northern Mexico and El Paso, Texas.

Because the temple district spans the international border, members from El Paso, Texas, regularly cross into Ciudad Juárez to worship.

=== Design and architecture ===
The Ciudad Juárez Mexico Temple is on a 1.63-acre site in Colonia Partido Romero. It has a single-story, 10,700-square-foot plan (measuring 77 by 149 feet), with a white marble veneer exterior, and a central spire with an angel Moroni on its top. The interior includes a baptistry, two instruction rooms, and two sealing rooms. The temple was designed by Alvaro Inigo of the church's architectural services group and constructed by Jacobsen Construction, with David Wills as project manager.

== Temple leadership and admittance ==
The church's temples are directed by a temple president and matron, each typically serving for a term of three years. The president and matron oversee the administration of temple operations and provide guidance and training for both temple patrons and staff. Serving from 2000 to 2004, Gerald M. Pratt was the first president, with Vera W. Pratt serving as matron. As of 2024, William S. Johns is the president, with Mary L. Johns serving as matron.

=== Admittance ===
A public open house was held February 12–19, 2000, prior to the dedication. Like all the church's temples, it is not used for Sunday worship services. To members of the church, temples are regarded as sacred houses of the Lord. Once dedicated, only church members with a current temple recommend can enter for worship.

== See also ==
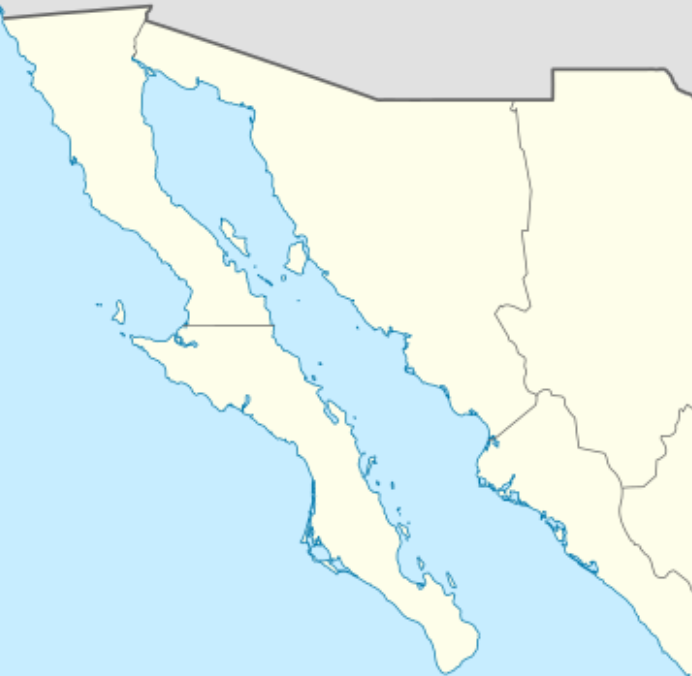

Temples in Northwestern Mexico

Northeast Mexico temples
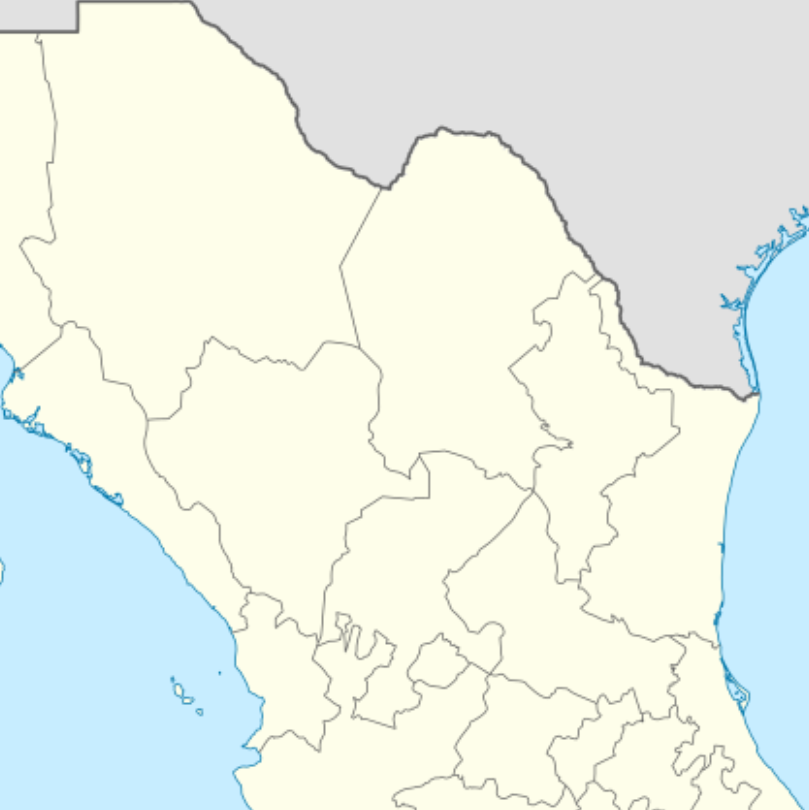
Temples in Northeastern Mexico
Central Mexico temples
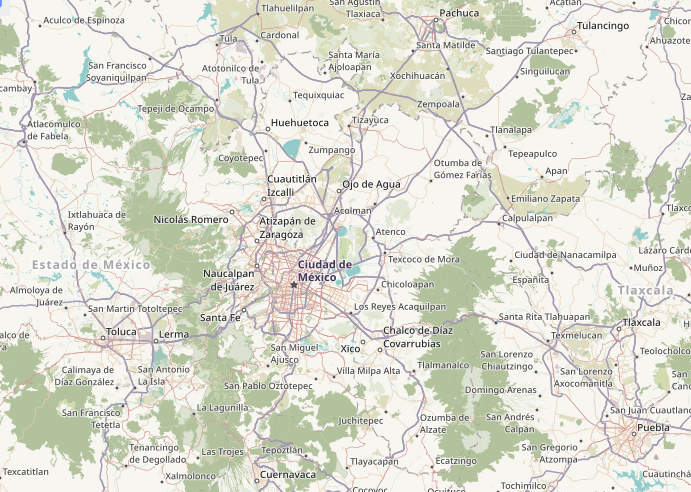
Temples in Central Mexico
Southeast Mexico temples
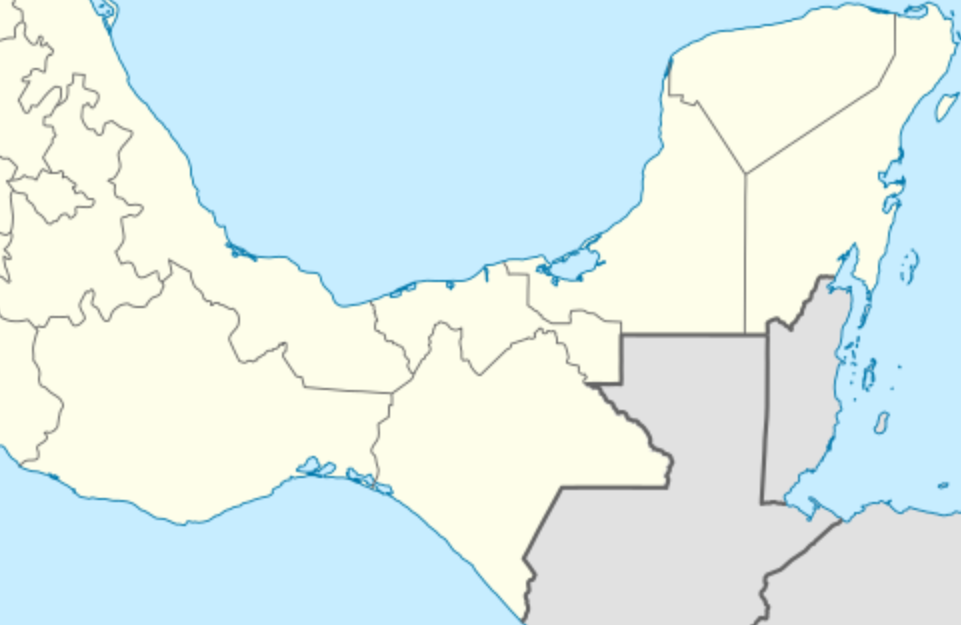
Temples in Southeast Mexico
Mexico map
Temples in Mexico

= Operating
= Under construction
= Announced
= Temporarily closed

- Comparison of temples of The Church of Jesus Christ of Latter-day Saints
- List of temples of The Church of Jesus Christ of Latter-day Saints
- List of temples of The Church of Jesus Christ of Latter-day Saints by geographic region
- Temple architecture (Latter-day Saints)
- The Church of Jesus Christ of Latter-day Saints in Mexico
- The Church of Jesus Christ of Latter-day Saints in Texas
