= Albuquerque New Mexico Temple =

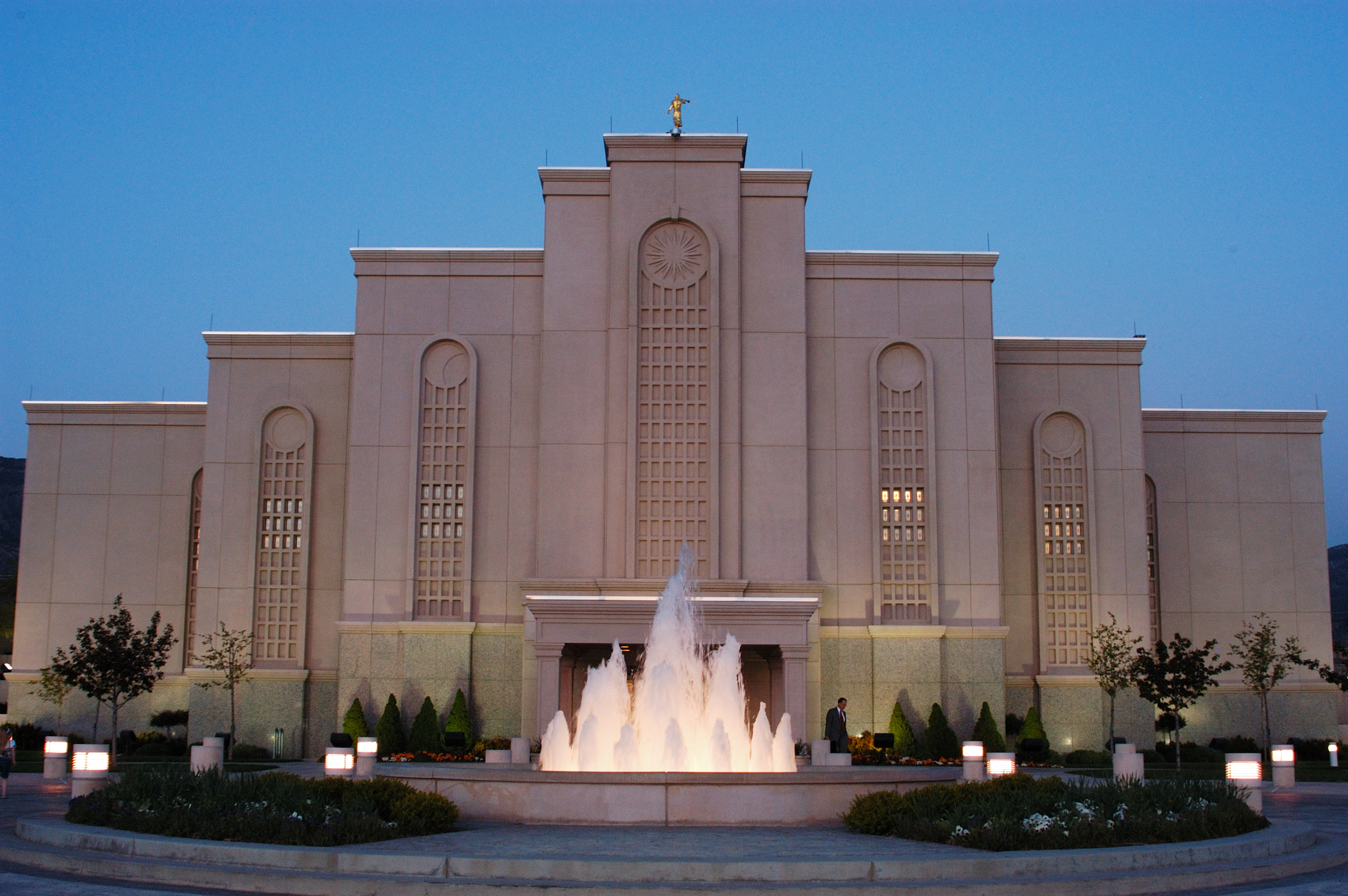
- Interactive map of Albuquerque New Mexico Temple
- Number: 73
- Dedication: March 5, 2000, by Gordon B. Hinckley
- Site: 8.5 acres (3.4 ha)
- Floor area: 34,245 ft^{2} (3,181.5 m^{2})
- Height: 114 ft (35 m)
- Official website • News & images

Church chronology
← Hermosillo Sonora Mexico Temple	Albuquerque New Mexico Temple	→ Oaxaca Mexico Temple

Additional information
- Announced: April 4, 1997, by Gordon B. Hinckley
- Groundbreaking: June 20, 1998, by Lynn A. Mickelsen
- Open house: February 17–26, 2000
- Current president: Ben M. Allen
- Designed by: Fanning Bard & Tatum
- Location: Albuquerque, New Mexico, United States
- Coordinates: 35°10′3.7″N 106°31′31.1″W
- Exterior finish: Desert Rose pre-cast concrete trimmed with Texas pearl granite
- Design: Classic modern, single-spire design
- Baptistries: 1
- Ordinance rooms: 2 (stationary)
- Sealing rooms: 3
- Clothing rental: Yes

The Albuquerque New Mexico Temple is the 73rd operating temple of the Church of Jesus Christ of Latter-day Saints, and is located in Albuquerque, New Mexico. The intent to build the temple was announced on April 4, 1997 by church president Gordon B. Hinckley during general conference, and is the first temple in New Mexico.

The temple is 34,245-square-foot building, is on an 8.5-acre site, and was designed by the architectural firm Fanning Bard & Tatum, using a classical modern style. Its exterior is constructed of Desert Rose pre-cast concrete panels accented by Texas Pearl granite. The building's spire has a gold-leafed statue of the angel Moroni, and the stained glass windows feature the agave plant, symbolically connecting the temple to the local Southwestern environment.

== History ==
The intent to build the temple was announced on April 4, 1997, by church president Gordon B. Hinckley during general conference. It is the first temple in New Mexico. A groundbreaking ceremony was held on June 20, 1998, conducted by Lynn A. Mickelsen, a church general authority. Approximately 6,500 local church members attended this event, which included a 600-voice youth choir.

After construction was completed, a public open house was held from February 17 to 26, 2000, with about 70,000 people touring the temple prior to its dedication. The temple was dedicated during four sessions by Hinckley on March 5, 2000, with more than 13,500 church members attending. During the dedicatory prayer, Hinckley expressed the hope that the temple would become "a sanctuary of peace," fostering spiritual reflection and strengthening family relationships among church members.

As of 2000, the Albuquerque New Mexico Temple served approximately 55,000 members across New Mexico and neighboring areas of Arizona and Colorado. It is on an 8.5-acre property in northeast Albuquerque, and its 34,000-square-foot building was designed by the architectural firm Fanning, Bard & Tatum Architects using a classical modern style. The exterior prominently features Desert Rose pre-cast concrete panels accented by Texas Pearl granite, and includes a single spire with a gold-leafed statue of the angel Moroni on top. Distinct stained glass windows depicting the agave plant symbolize the temple’s connection to the local Southwestern heritage.

In 2020, like all others in the church, the Albuquerque New Mexico Temple was closed for a time in response to the COVID-19 pandemic.

== Design and architecture ==
The Albuquerque New Mexico Temple is on an 8.5-acre plot in northeast Albuquerque, with views of the city and the nearby Sandia Mountains. The landscaping has a large fountain near the entrance.

The temple is a 34,000-square-foot building designed by the architectural firm Fanning Bard & Tatum, using a classical modern style. Its exterior uses Desert Rose pre-cast concrete accented with Texas Pearl granite, resulting in a soft pink hue that complements the colors of the Sandia Mountains.

The interior includes a baptistry, two ordinance rooms, and three sealing rooms, each designed for ceremonial purposes. The interior decoration uses symbolic elements significant to the local culture, including stained glass windows prominently feature the agave plant, reflective of Southwestern botanical heritage.

Symbolic design elements such as the agave plant depicted in stained glass connect the temple directly to its New Mexican context, symbolizing regional identity and spiritual nourishment.

=== Renovations ===
Since its dedication in 2000, the temple has undergone various renovations to preserve its structural integrity and enhance its functionality. Its original hinged entrance doors were replaced with glass sliding doors, specifically to mitigate challenges posed by frequent mountain winds common to the Albuquerque area. Additionally, in October 2019, the former kitchen and cafeteria located on the temple’s ground level were remodeled into additional office space to better accommodate administrative needs.

== Temple presidents ==
The church's temples are directed by a temple president and matron, each serving for a term of three years. The president and matron oversee the administration of temple operations and provide guidance and training for both temple patrons and staff.

Serving from 2000 to 2003, the temple's first president was Emerson W. Pratt, with Myrna J. Pratt serving as matron. As of 2024, the temple president is Ben M. Allen, with Monica A. Allen serving as matron.

== Admittance ==
Following completion of construction, the Albuquerque New Mexico Temple was opened to the public for tours from February 17 to February 26, 2000, excluding Sundays. Approximately 70,000 visitors toured the building during this period. Church president Gordon B. Hinckley dedicated the temple on March 5, 2000, in four dedicatory sessions attended by more than 13,500 church members.

Like all the church's temples, it is not used for Sunday worship services. To members of the church, temples are regarded as sacred houses of the Lord. Once dedicated, only church members with a current temple recommend can enter for worship, although anyone may visit and walk around the grounds during open hours. There is no visitors' center available at this temple site.

== See also ==
Temples in and near New Mexico
- = Operating
- = Under construction
- = Announced
- = Temporarily Closed
- Comparison of temples (LDS Church)
- List of temples (LDS Church)
- List of temples by geographic region (LDS Church)
- Temple architecture (LDS Church)
- The Church of Jesus Christ of Latter-day Saints in New Mexico

== Additional reading ==
- Traver, Holly (June 27, 1998), "Ground broken for temple in New Mexico", Church News
- "Angel Moroni statues placed atop 2 temples", Church News, June 26, 1999
- "Open house, dedication set for Albuquerque temple", Church News, February 5, 2000
- "'A place that ties families together'", Church News, March 11, 2000
- Weaver, Sarah Jane (March 11, 2000), "Temple melding members of three cultures", Church News
- Albuquerque New Mexico Temple Dedicatory Prayer
