= Hermosillo Sonora Mexico Temple =

Temple of the LDS Church

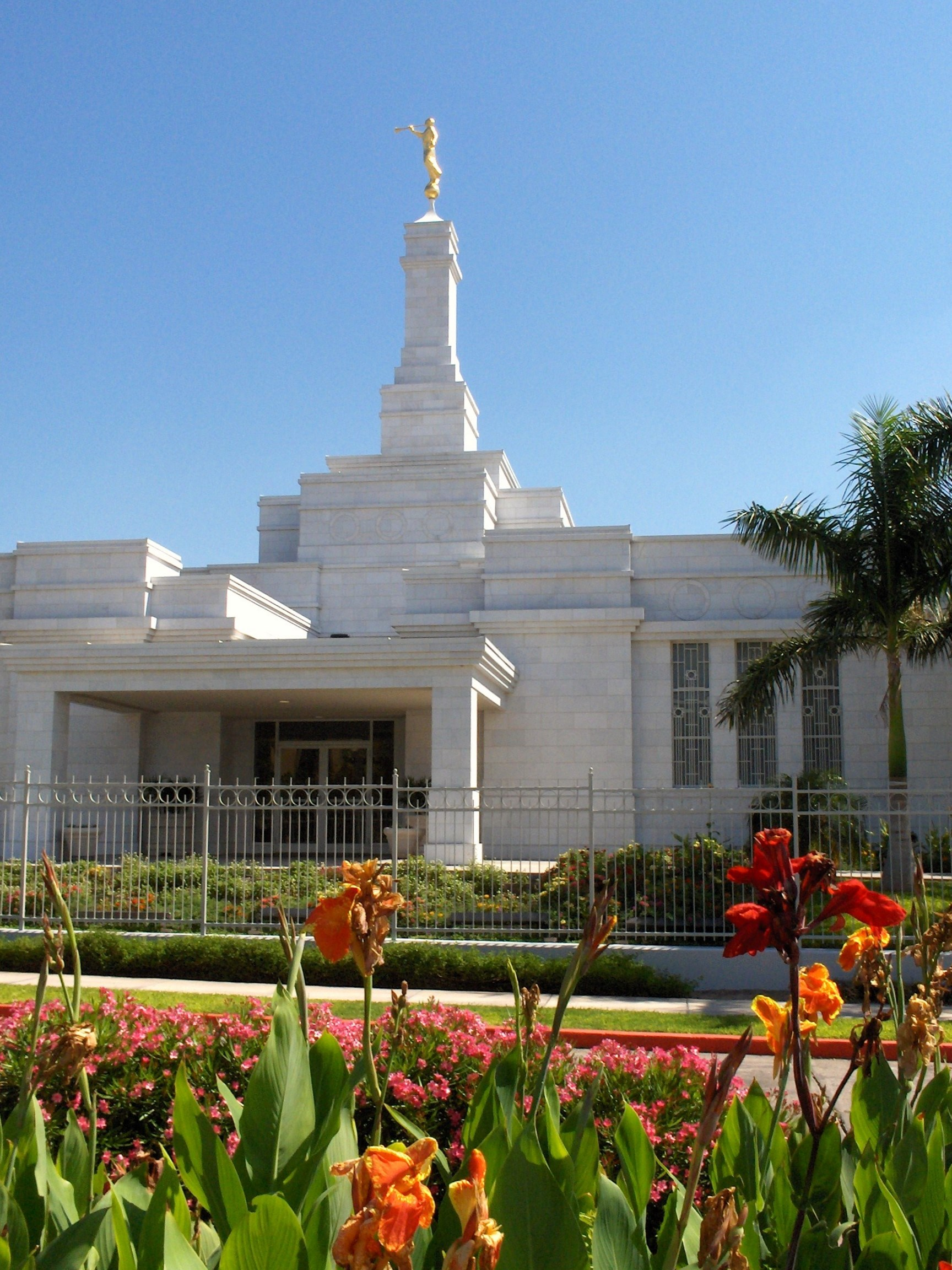
- Interactive map of Hermosillo Sonora Mexico Temple
- Number: 72
- Dedication: 27 February 2000, by Gordon B. Hinckley
- Site: 1.54 acres (0.62 ha)
- Floor area: 10,769 ft^{2} (1,000.5 m^{2})
- Height: 71 ft (22 m)
- Official website • News & images

Church chronology
← Ciudad Juárez Mexico Temple	Hermosillo Sonora Mexico Temple	→ Albuquerque New Mexico Temple

Additional information
- Announced: 20 July 1998, by Gordon B. Hinckley
- Groundbreaking: 5 December 1998, by Eran A. Call
- Open house: 15–19 February 2000
- Current president: Alfredo Zanudo Urrea
- Designed by: Alvaro Inigo and Church A&E Services
- Location: Hermosillo, Sonora, Mexico
- Coordinates: 29°6′9.039599″N 110°56′49.04519″W
- Exterior finish: White marble veneer
- Design: Classic modern, single-spire design
- Baptistries: 1
- Ordinance rooms: 2 (two-stage progressive)
- Sealing rooms: 2

The Hermosillo Sonora Mexico Temple is a temple of the Church of Jesus Christ of Latter-day Saints in Hermosillo, Sonora, Mexico. The intent to build the temple was announced by the First Presidency on July 20, 1998. It is the fourth in Mexico and the church's 72nd operating temple worldwide. The building uses a classic modern design with white marble veneer exterior. A groundbreaking ceremony, to signify the beginning of construction, was held on December 5, 1998, with Eran A. Call, a church general authority, presiding. After construction was completed, Approximately 10,540 people toured the temple during its public open house. The temple was dedicated on February 27, 2000, by church president Gordon B. Hinckley, one day after he dedicated the Ciudad Juárez Mexico Temple.

== History ==
The temple was announced on July 20, 1998, by the First Presidency. This followed a visit by church president Gordon B. Hinckley to the area in March 1998, during which he promised local church members that a temple would be built in their city. The site was officially announced as Hermosillo four months later.

The temple site is a 2.07-acre property located on the eastern side of Hermosillo in the Pitic neighborhood. The property sits directly north of the stake center for the Hermosillo Mexico Pitic Stake and faces a landscaped boulevard with flowers, trees, benches, and pavers.

The groundbreaking ceremony took place on December 5, 1998, presided over by Eran A. Call, a General Authority Seventy and counselor in the presidency of the church's Mexico South Area. Approximately 1,200 people attended the ceremony. In his remarks, Call stated that a temple is "an island of importance in our eternal journey to return to the presence of our Father in Heaven and live with him again after this life. The work done in the temple is eternal. It is a work of love." This ceremony was held on the same day as the one for the Columbia South Carolina Temple.

During construction, local members volunteered to landscape the boulevard in front of the temple and planted flowers to beautify the area. The temple began making an impact before its completion, as many less-active members responded to invitations from their bishops to return to activity, and members in the city gained a new appreciation for the church.

Following construction, the church announced the public open house that was held from February 15 to February 19, 2000. During the five-day open house, approximately 10,540 guests toured the building.

The Hermosillo Sonora Mexico Temple was dedicated on February 27, 2000, by Hinckley in four dedicatory sessions. This dedication was the 50th temple Hinckley had either dedicated or rededicated. This took place one day after Hinckley had dedicated the Ciudad Juárez Mexico Temple. The dedication sessions were attended by 5,898 church members. Hinckley and his wife, Marjorie, were accompanied by Henry B. Eyring of Quorum of the Twelve Apostles, and his wife, Kathleen, and Lynn A. Mickelsen, president of the Mexico North Area, and his wife, Jeanine.

The area surrounding Hermosillo is significant in the church's history. In 1875, Brigham Young called the first group of missionaries to Mexico. Just a few miles outside of Hermosillo in 1877, the first five converts in Mexico were baptized by Louis Garff and Meliton Trejo. Trejo was a Spanish convert who had a dream while serving as an officer in the Philippines that led him to the United States in search of church members.

Before it was built, members in the Hermosillo area faced significant challenges in attending temple services. Many had been unable to travel to temples because they lacked the time or financial resources for the journey. The nearest temples were in Mexico City, requiring approximately 36 hours of travel by car or bus each way, or in Mesa, Arizona, which was closer but required crossing the international border with visas and passports. Miguel E. Becerra, president of the Hermosillo Mexico Stake, expressed the significance of having a local temple, stating that in the past it was not possible for all to attend temple services, but now more members, including youth, would be able to participate in temple work.

In 2020, like all the church's others, the Hermosillo Sonora Mexico Temple was closed for a time in response to the COVID-19 pandemic.

== Design and architecture ==
The Hermosillo Sonora Mexico Temple was designed by Alvaro Inigo and church employees, using a classic modern design style. The project manager was David Wills, and the contractors were Grana y Montero and Jacobsen Construction.

The temple is on a 2.07-acre plot in the Pitic neighborhood of Hermosillo. It faces Avenida Pedro García Conde, a boulevard with a center island with flowers, trees, benches, and pavers. The landscaping around the temple was developed by local church members volunteering during construction.

The temple is approximately 77 feet by 149 feet, with a total floor area of 10,700 square feet. The exterior has white marble veneer and has a statue of the angel Moroni on top of its spire.

The temple has two ordinance rooms, two sealing rooms, and a baptistry.

== Temple leadership and admittance ==
The church's temples are directed by a temple president and matron, each typically serving for a term of three years. The president and matron oversee the administration of temple operations and provide guidance and training for both temple patrons and staff. Serving from 2000 to 2003, Héctor C. Luzanilla was the first president, with Dolores A. de Ceballos serving as matron. As of 2024, Jose A. Zanudo Urrea is the president, with Guadalupe V. de Zanudo serving as matron.

=== Admittance ===
After construction was completed, the church announced the public open house that was held from February 15 to February 19, 2000. Like all the church's temples, it is not used for Sunday worship services. To members of the church, temples are regarded as sacred houses of the Lord. Once dedicated, only church members with a current temple recommend can enter for worship.

== See also ==
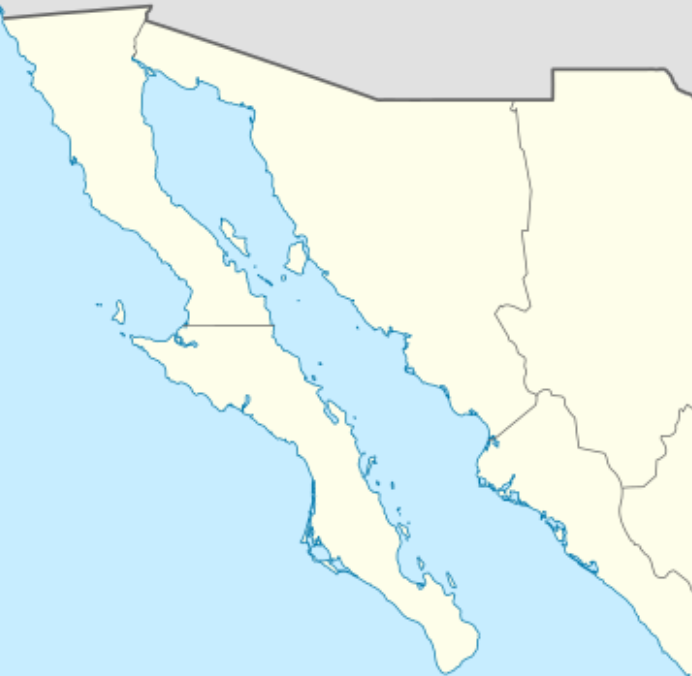

Temples in Northwestern Mexico

Northeast Mexico temples
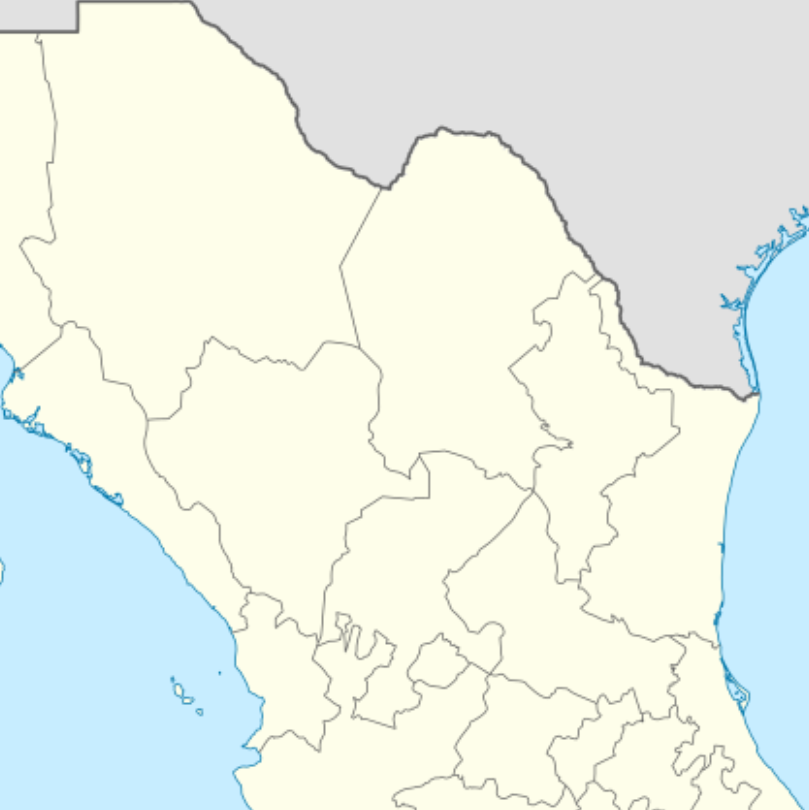
Temples in Northeastern Mexico
Central Mexico temples
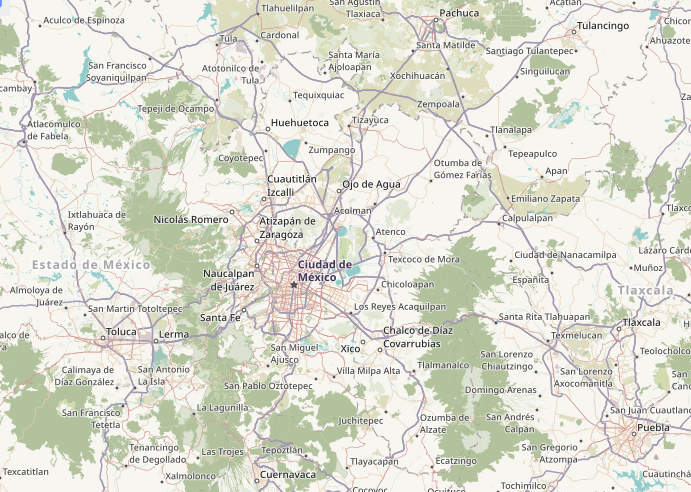
Temples in Central Mexico
Southeast Mexico temples
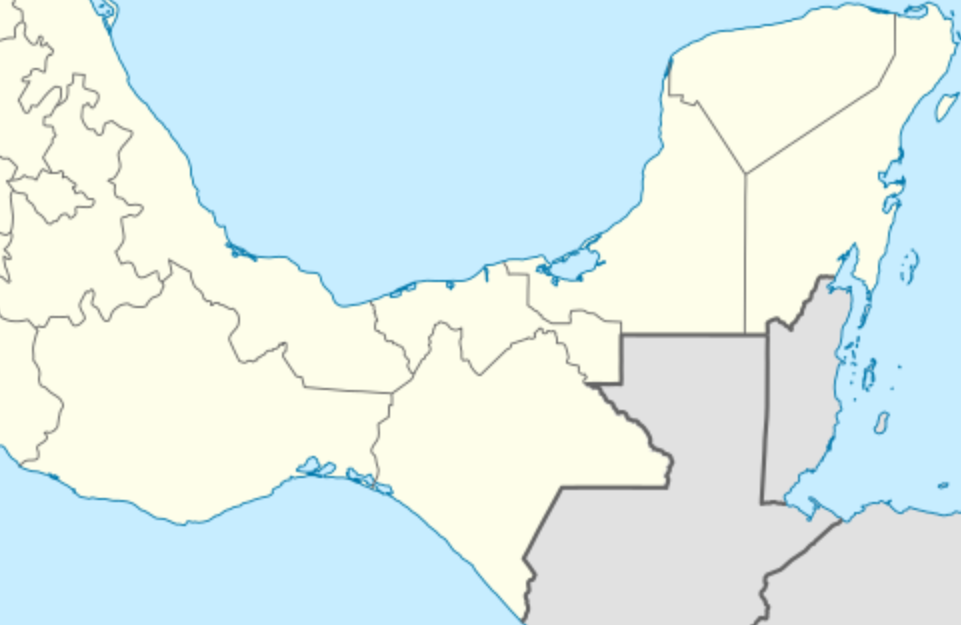
Temples in Southeast Mexico
Mexico map
Temples in Mexico

= Operating
= Under construction
= Announced
= Temporarily closed

- Comparison of temples of The Church of Jesus Christ of Latter-day Saints
- List of temples of The Church of Jesus Christ of Latter-day Saints
- List of temples of The Church of Jesus Christ of Latter-day Saints by geographic region
- Temple architecture (Latter-day Saints)
- The Church of Jesus Christ of Latter-day Saints in Mexico

== Additional reading ==
- "Hermosillo temple dates announced", Church News, Jan 8, 2000
- Hart, John L. (March 4, 2000), "Impact on lives begins even before completion of Hermosillo Temple", Church News
- "President Hinckley presides at rites for 50th temple", Church News, March 4, 2000
