= Arequipa Peru Temple =

Temple for Church of Jesus Christ of Latter Day Saints located in Arequipa, Peru

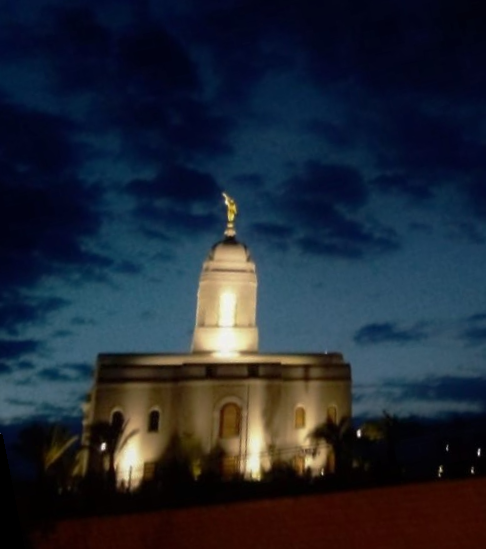
- The Arequipa Peru Temple
- Interactive map of Arequipa Peru Temple
- Number: 167
- Dedication: 15 December 2019, by Ulisses Soares
- Site: 7.91 acres (3.20 ha)
- Floor area: 26,969 ft^{2} (2,505.5 m^{2})
- Official website • News & images

Church chronology
← Lisbon Portugal Temple	Arequipa Peru Temple	→ Durban South Africa Temple

Additional information
- Announced: 6 October 2012, by Thomas S. Monson
- Groundbreaking: 4 March 2017, by Carlos A. Godoy
- Open house: November 15-30, 2019
- Current president: Juan H. Mendoza Contreras
- Location: Arequipa, Peru
- Coordinates: 16.3754°S 71.5387°W
- Baptistries: 1
- Ordinance rooms: 2
- Sealing rooms: 2

The Arequipa Peru Temple is a temple of the Church of Jesus Christ of Latter-day Saints, located in the Cayma District of Arequipa, Peru. It is the third constructed in Peru, following those in Lima and Trujillo, and the church's 167th operating temple worldwide. Announced on October 6, 2012, by church president Thomas S. Monson during general conference, it was built to serve Latter-day Saints across southern Peru, significantly reducing travel time of up to 14 hours to the temple in Lima.

The temple was designed in a style inspired by Spanish Colonial and Baroque architecture, incorporating local Arequipeño elements such as native plant landscaping, art-glass windows featuring the Flor de Texao, and gray-white granite reminiscent of the region's historic sillar stone buildings. A groundbreaking ceremony was held on March 4, 2017, and led by Carlos A. Godoy, then serving as president of the church's South America Northwest Area.

After construction was completed, more than 80,000 visitors attended a public open house in November 2019. The temple was dedicated in three sessions on December 15, 2019, by Ulisses Soares of the Quorum of the Twelve Apostles.

== History ==
The Arequipa Peru Temple was announced during general conference by church president Thomas S. Monson on October 6, 2012, concurrently with the Tucson Arizona Temple. It was the third temple announced in Peru and the 167th across the world.

In January 2016, the temple site—located in the Cayma District of Arequipa—received zoning approval and building permits for construction on approximately 7.91 acres (3.2 ha). Preliminary plans were for a structure of 26,969 square feet (2,505 m^{2}). In March 2016, a general contractor was selected.

Church members gathered for a groundbreaking ceremony, to mark the commencement of construction, on March 4, 2017. Presiding was Carlos A. Godoy, president of the South America Northwest Area, who was joined by his counselors Enrique R. Falabella and Hugo Montoya. During construction, the angel Moroni statue—gilded in gold leaf—was placed on the temple's cupola lantern on November 30, 2018, in a ceremony attended by hundreds of onlookers.

After construction was completed, a public open house was held from November 15 to 30, 2019 (excluding Sundays), with over 80,000 people touring the temple.

The temple was dedicated in three sessions on December 15, 2019, by Ulisses Soares of the Quorum of the Twelve Apostles. The dedication included a traditional cornerstone ceremony and was broadcast to meetinghouses throughout the temple district.

In 2020, like all the church's others, the Arequipa Peru Temple was closed for a time in response to the COVID-19 pandemic.

== Design and architecture ==
The Arequipa Peru Temple blends Spanish Colonial and Baroque architectural influences, reflecting the historic aesthetic of the area. It is on a 7.91-acre plot in the Cayma District of Arequipa. The landscape includes Spanish colonial style water fountains, elevated terraces, and native Andean plantings such as cantuta, queñua, and achupaya. There are also many different species of evergreens, palm trees, and flowering trees along the grounds.

The two-story structure's exterior has gray-white granite, using the traditional sillar stone seen throughout Arequipa's colonial architecture. Although the origin of the name of Arequipa is still debated, a tradition states that the name comes from an old Andean phrase: ari qquepan, which loosely equates to "trumpet sound". A central tower on the temple has an angel Moroni statue blowing a trumpet, symbolizing the restoration of the gospel, and eternal possibility. Art-glass windows are used throughout the exterior, many featuring imagery of the Flor de Texao, a flower native to Arequipa, which also appears in etched metal detailing and decorative finishes on the facade.

Inside the temple, a variety of international and local materials are used, including Italian Perlantino marble flooring, multi-colored wool rugs from China, and giclée prints illustrating scenes from the life and ministry of Jesus Christ.

The celestial room has a Texao floral motif on the flooring, paintings, and other stonework, along with carved hardwood and metalwork. The baptistry is constructed with a font resting on twelve oxen, which the church has said represents the Twelve tribes of Israel.

== Temple presidents and admittance ==
The church's temples are directed by a temple president and matron, each typically serving for a term of three years. The president and matron oversee the administration of temple operations and provide guidance and training for both temple patrons and staff.

Serving from 2019 to 2021, Ramiro A. Saenz was the first president, with Elvira A. Sumoya de Antelo serving as matron. As of 2024, Juan H. Mendoza Contreras is the president, with Rosa P. de Mendoza serving as matron.

On May 21, 2019, the church announced the public open house that was held from November 15 to November 30, 2019 (excluding Sundays). The temple was dedicated in three sessions by Ulisses Soares of the Quorum of the Twelve Apostles on December 15, 2019. Like all the church's temples, it is not used for Sunday worship services. To members of the church, temples are regarded as sacred houses of the Lord. Once dedicated, only church members with a current temple recommend can enter for worship.

== See also ==
- List of temples of The Church of Jesus Christ of Latter-day Saints
- List of temples of The Church of Jesus Christ of Latter-day Saints by geographic region
- The Church of Jesus Christ of Latter-day Saints in Peru
