= The Church of Jesus Christ of Latter-day Saints in Portugal =

- (Logo in Portuguese)

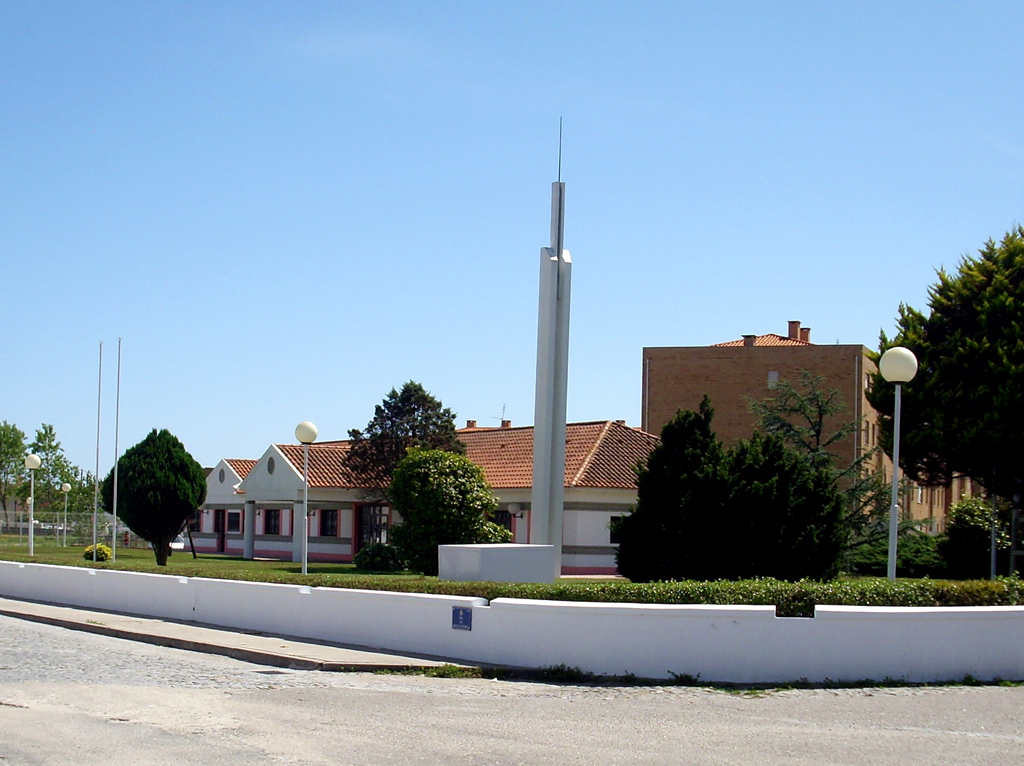
- A meetinghouse of the Church of Jesus Christ of Latter-day Saints in Póvoa de Varzim
- Area: Europe North
- Members: 50,341 (2025)
- Stakes: 8
- Districts: 1
- Wards: 47
- Branches: 17
- Total congregations: 64
- Missions: 2
- Temples: 1 operating; 1 announced; 2 total
- FamilySearch Centers: 24

The Church of Jesus Christ of Latter-day Saints in Portugal refers to the Church of Jesus Christ of Latter-day Saints (LDS Church) and its members in Portugal. As of 2025, the LDS Church reported 50,341 members in 64 congregations in Portugal, making it the third largest body of LDS Church members in Europe behind the United Kingdom and Spain. In 2019, Portugal had the most LDS Church members per capita in Europe. Nearly all members are native Portuguese or permanent immigrants from former Portuguese territories.

== History ==
Membership in Portugal
Year	Membership
1975	91
1979	2,098
1989*	23,000
1999	35,248
2009	38,188
2019	45,576
2025	50,341
*Membership was published as an estimate. Source: Wendall J. Ashton; Jim M. Wall, Deseret News, various years, Church Almanac Country Information: Portugal

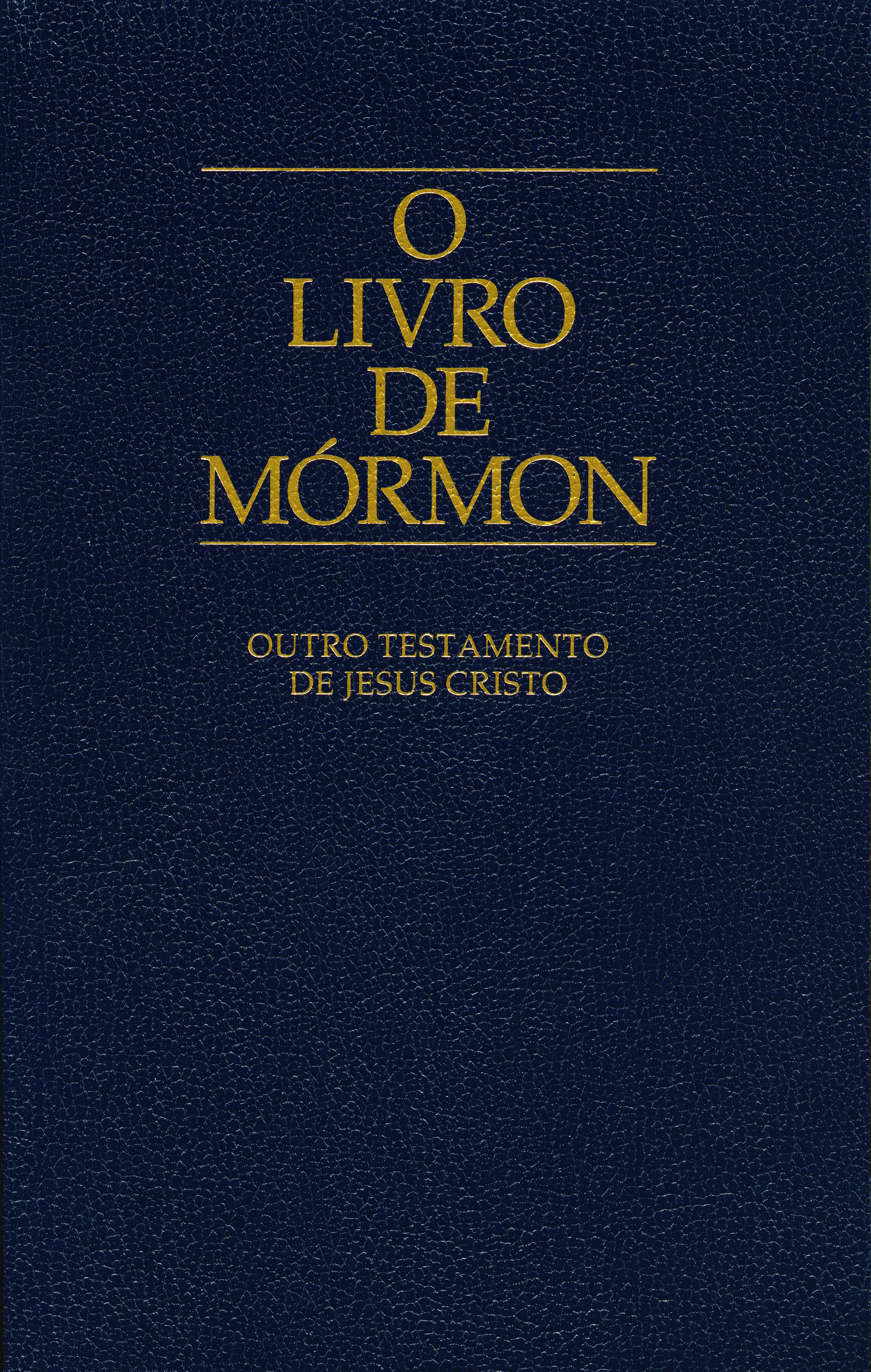
The Portuguese translation of the Book of Mormon, originally published in 1939

The first meetings of the LDS Church in Portugal were among members of U.S. armed forces stationed in the country in early 1970. In April 1974, the mostly peaceful Carnation Revolution brought an end to decades of authoritarian rule that had formally promoted Roman Catholicism and had restricted other faiths from proselyting. Several weeks after the fall of this Estado Novo regime, church president Spencer W. Kimball visited Portugal and received confirmation that the LDS Church would be recognized and that the missionaries could start preaching in the country.

In November 1974, William Grant Bangerter of the Quorum of the Seventy came to Lisbon to preside over the newly created Portugal Lisbon Mission. Four Portuguese-speaking missionaries were transferred to the new mission from Brazil. The first official meetings of the LDS Church were held at the home of a member of the Canadian embassy who lived in Portugal.

By July 1975, there were already about 100 Portuguese Latter-day Saints, and by July 1978, membership reached 1,000. The church's growth has steadily progressed since that time; at year-end 2016, more than 38,000 church members lived in Portugal, organized in dozens of local congregations known as wards and branches.

== Relationship with the media ==
The LDS Church uses a religious programming space provided on channel RTP 2 in conjunction with other religious denominations. This opportunity is made possible under Portugal's religious freedom laws. It consists of two programs, the seven-minute "People of Faith" and the 30-minute "Paths". A number of radio programs are also provided on station RDP in formats similar to television programming.

== Stakes ==
As of February 2025, the LDS Church has 8 stakes and a district in Portugal:

Stake/District	Organized	Mission
Açores Portugal District	28 Mar 1982	Portugal Lisbon
Almada Portugal Stake	28 Mar 2021	Portugal Lisbon
Coimbra Portugal Stake	14 Apr 2002	Portugal Porto
Lisbon Portugal Stake	10 Jun 1981	Portugal Lisbon
Oeiras Portugal Stake	25 Jun 1989	Portugal Lisbon
Porto Portugal North Stake	28 May 1989	Portugal Porto
Porto Portugal Stake	2 Nov 1986	Portugal Porto
Santarém Portugal Stake	16 Feb 2025	Portugal Lisbon
Setúbal Portugal Stake	6 Sep 1987	Portugal Lisbon

== Mission ==
- Portugal Lisbon Mission
- Portugal Porto Mission

== Temples ==
The Lisbon Portugal Temple was announced on 2 October 2010 by church president Thomas S. Monson. A groundbreaking service, to signify beginning of construction, was held on 5 December 2015, with Patrick Kearon, president of the church's Europe Area, presiding. The temple was dedicated on 15 September 2019 by Neil L. Andersen.

- = Operating
- = Under construction
- = Announced
- = Temporarily Closed

166. Lisbon Portugal Temple; Official website; News & images	
Location: Announced: Groundbreaking: Dedicated: Size:	Lisbon, Portugal; 2 October 2010 by Thomas S. Monson; 5 December 2015 by Patrick Kearon; 15 September 2019 by Neil L. Andersen; 23,730 sq ft (2,205 m^{2}) on a 4.6-acre (1.9 ha) site - designed by Simão Silva, ACS Architects
372. Porto Portugal Temple (Announced); Official website; News & images	
Location: Announced:	Porto, Portugal; 6 April 2025 by Russell M. Nelson

== See also ==
- Church of Christ (Latter Day Saints)
- Religion in Portugal
