= Trujillo Peru Temple =

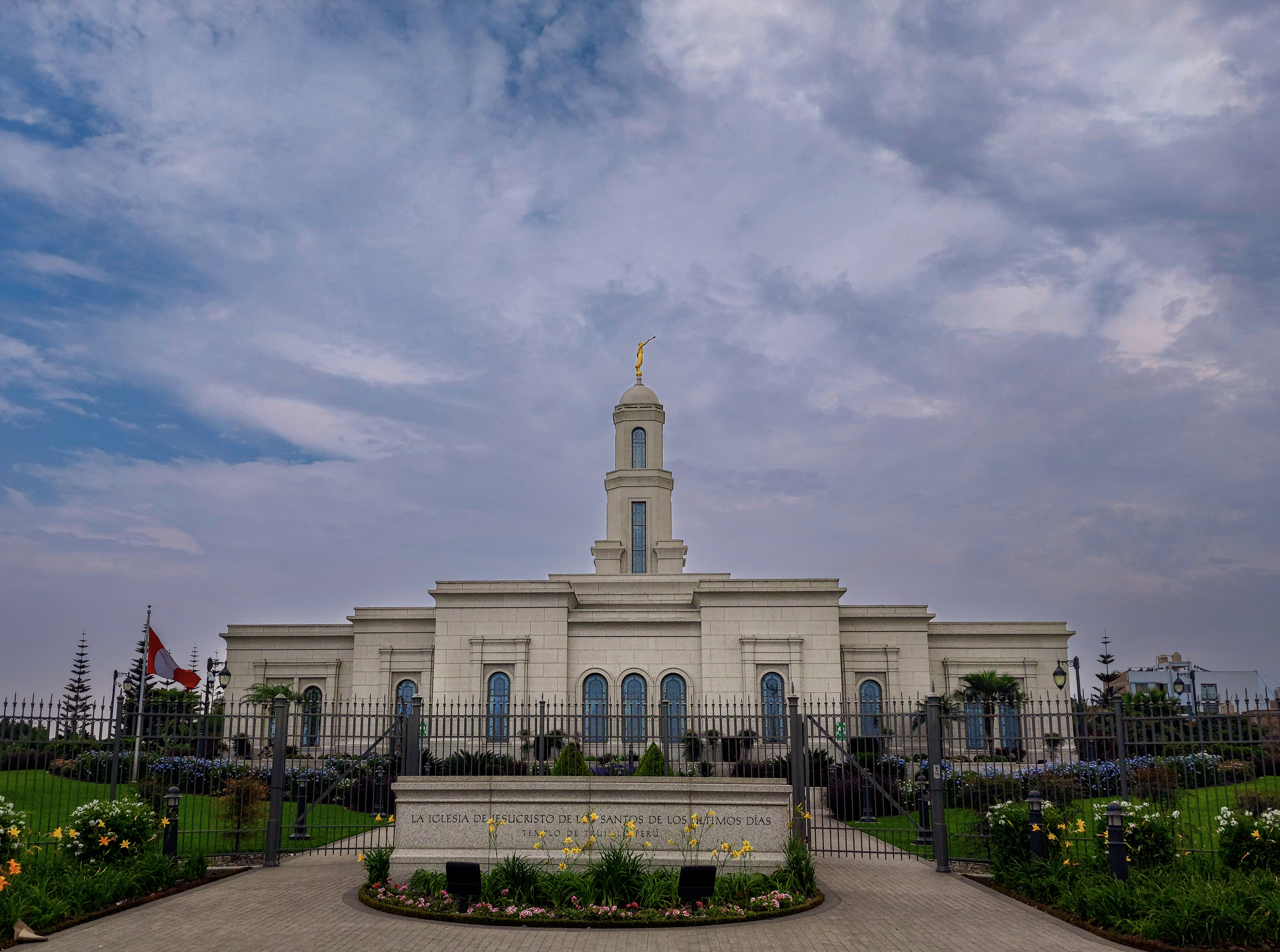
- The Trujillo Peru Temple
- Interactive map of Trujillo Peru Temple
- Number: 147
- Dedication: 21 June 2015, by Dieter F. Uchtdorf
- Site: 8.9 acres (3.6 ha)
- Floor area: 28,200 ft^{2} (2,620 m^{2})
- Height: 91 ft (28 m)
- Official website • News & images

Church chronology
← Payson Utah Temple	Trujillo Peru Temple	→ Indianapolis Indiana Temple

Additional information
- Announced: 13 December 2008, by Thomas S. Monson
- Groundbreaking: 14 September 2011, by Rafael E. Pino
- Open house: 8-30 May 2015
- Current president: Roy D. Harline
- Location: Trujillo, Peru
- Coordinates: 8°5′54″S 79°2′1.8″W
- Exterior finish: Branco Ceara granite from Brazil
- Baptistries: 1
- Ordinance rooms: 2 (two-stage progressive)
- Sealing rooms: 2

The Trujillo Peru Temple is a temple of the Church of Jesus Christ of Latter-day Saints in Trujillo, La Libertad, Peru. The intent to build the temple was announced by the church's First Presidency on December 13, 2008. It is the second in Peru, following the Lima Peru Temple, the 17th in South America, and serves more than 88,000 members in the northern regions of the country.

The temple has a single central spire topped with a statue of the angel Moroni. It was constructed under the direction of Aspersud, managed by engineer Fernando Guzmán, and designed in a Spanish colonial style with Brazilian Branco Ceara granite exteriors. A groundbreaking ceremony to signify the beginning of construction was held on September 14, 2011, conducted by Rafael E. Pino, then president of the church's South America Northwest Area. Designed in a Spanish colonial style with granite exteriors and stained-glass windows, it has two ordinance rooms and two sealing rooms.

== History ==
The church's first building constructed in Trujillo was dedicated in 1967 by Spencer W. Kimball of the Quorum of the Twelve Apostles. The first Trujillo stake was organized in 1978 by apostle Thomas S. Monson.

Peru's only previous operating temple, which served approximately 114 stakes and districts, was dedicated in Lima by Gordon B. Hinckley in January 1986. Members from Trujillo would travel nine to 10 hours to that temple. Due to the large number of church members attending in Lima, patrons sometimes waited for hours to participate in ordinances. These factors contributed to the need for a temple in Trujillo.

Plans for a temple in Trujillo were announced by the First Presidency on December 13, 2008. At the time, it was the second temple planned for Peru and was among several under construction in South America, including those in Manaus, Brazil, and Córdoba, Argentina. The announcement brought the church's total number temples worldwide to 146 operating, announced, or under construction.

The groundbreaking and site dedication were held on September 14, 2011, presided over by Rafael E. Pino, a church general authority. He was joined by his counselors, Juan A. Uceda and W. Christopher Waddell, along with their wives. A rendering of the building was released on September 30.

Construction began in August 2012. The church’s local entity, Aspersud, managed the project with Cosapi S.A. as general contractor and Fernando Guzmán as project manager. Architectural design was led by GSBS Architecture of Salt Lake City, Utah.

After construction was completed, a public open house was held from May 8 to 30, 2015, excluding Sundays, allowing visitors to tour the completed building. Approximately 100,000 people participated in the open house, prior to the building's dedication. The temple was dedicated on June 21, 2015, in three sessions, by Dieter F. Uchtdorf.

The day before the dedication, a cultural celebration took place at the Gran Chimú Coliseum. Latter-day Saint youth performed traditional Peruvian dance and music to highlight the cultural heritage of the region.

== Design and architecture ==
The temple is on a 3.6-hectare (8.9-acre) site on Avenida Mansiche, km 3.5, in the Huanchaco District of Trujillo. It is located near the Camposanto Parque Eterno cemetery on the Mansiche Highway that leads to Huanchaco, and east of the Chan Chan ruins, a pre-Columbian city designated a UNESCO World Heritage Site in 1986. In addition to the temple, the site includes a lodging center for traveling patrons and land reserved for a future meetinghouse.

The building is 28,200 square feet (2,620 m²) and rises to a height of 31.5 meters (103 ft), including the angel Moroni statue. Its exterior uses Brazilian Branco Ceara granite, with stained-glass windows in white, green, cream, and amber.

The interior has African makore wood and Peruvian limestone. Stained-glass windows decorated with vine motifs are featured throughout the building. The temple contains two ordinance rooms and two sealing rooms. The temple’s design integrates elements of Spanish colonial style as a reflection of local heritage, while decorative motifs inside and outside the building.

== Cultural and community impact ==
The temple's completion was an important for the church in the country, as it was became the second built in Peru. By offering temple ordinances closer to home for members in northern regions, it reduced the long journeys previously required to reach Lima. Local and national media reported on the temple’s architectural presence and the public events surrounding its dedication, which were seen as significant cultural moments for the city of Trujillo. Coverage emphasized both the temple’s role as a place of worship and its significance as a landmark in the community.

The cultural celebration held before the dedication brought together Latter-day Saint youth from across the region, who presented dances and music rooted in Peruvian traditions. The event highlighted the integration of the church’s global practices with the cultural heritage of the country.

== Temple presidents ==
The church's temples are directed by a temple president and matron, each typically serving for a term of three years. The president and matron oversee the administration of temple operations and provide guidance and training for both temple patrons and staff. Serving from 2015 to 2018, Rómulo Jesús Casós was the first president, with Marlene María Müller de Casós serving as matron. As of 2024, the temple’s president and matron are Roy D. Harline and Maria Estela Harline.

== Admittance ==
On May 5, 2015, the church announced the public open house that was held from May 8 to May 30 (excluding Sundays). The temple was dedicated by Dieter F. Uchtdorf, a counselor in the First Presidency, on June 21, 2015. Like all the church's temples, it is not used for Sunday worship services. To members of the church, temples are regarded as sacred houses of the Lord. Once dedicated, only church members with a current temple recommend can enter for worship.

== See also ==
Lima Temples

Temples in and near Peru
= Operating
= Under construction
= Announced
= Temporarily Closed

- Comparison of temples of The Church of Jesus Christ of Latter-day Saints
- List of temples of The Church of Jesus Christ of Latter-day Saints
- List of temples of The Church of Jesus Christ of Latter-day Saints by geographic region
- Temple architecture (Latter-day Saints)
- The Church of Jesus Christ of Latter-day Saints in Peru
