= The Church of Jesus Christ of Latter-day Saints in Spain =

- (Logo in Spanish)

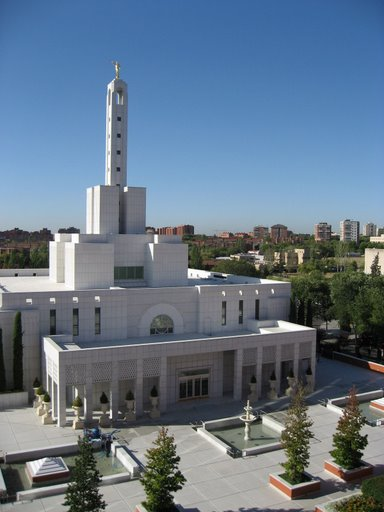
- The Madrid Spain Temple
- Area: Europe Central
- Members: 71,995 (2025)
- Stakes: 17
- Districts: 1
- Wards: 95
- Branches: 55
- Total Congregations: 150
- Missions: 3
- Temples: 1 operating; 1 announced; 2 total
- FamilySearch Centers: 56

The first permanent congregation of The Church of Jesus Christ of Latter-day Saints in Spain was established in 1948. As of 2025, the Church reported 71,995 members in 150 congregations in Spain, making it the second largest body of Church members in Europe behind the United Kingdom. In 2019, Spain had the 3rd most Church members per capita among countries in Europe, behind Portugal and the United Kingdom.

== History ==
Membership in Spain
Year	Membership
1974	620
1979	5,395
1989*	17,000
1999	30,439
2009	45,729
2019	59,730
2025	71,995
*Membership was published as an estimate. Source: Wendall J. Ashton; Jim M. Wall, Deseret News, various years, Church Almanac Country Information: Spain

No formal missionary work was performed in Spain until after the Church was officially recognized in 1968 by the Spanish government. The first branch (small congregation) other than among US Military staff stationed in Spain, was organized in 1968 in Madrid. In 1982, the Madrid and Barcelona Stakes were organized. The Spain Missionary Training Center (MTC), located in the Madrid Temple complex, was established in 1999.

== Stakes and Districts ==
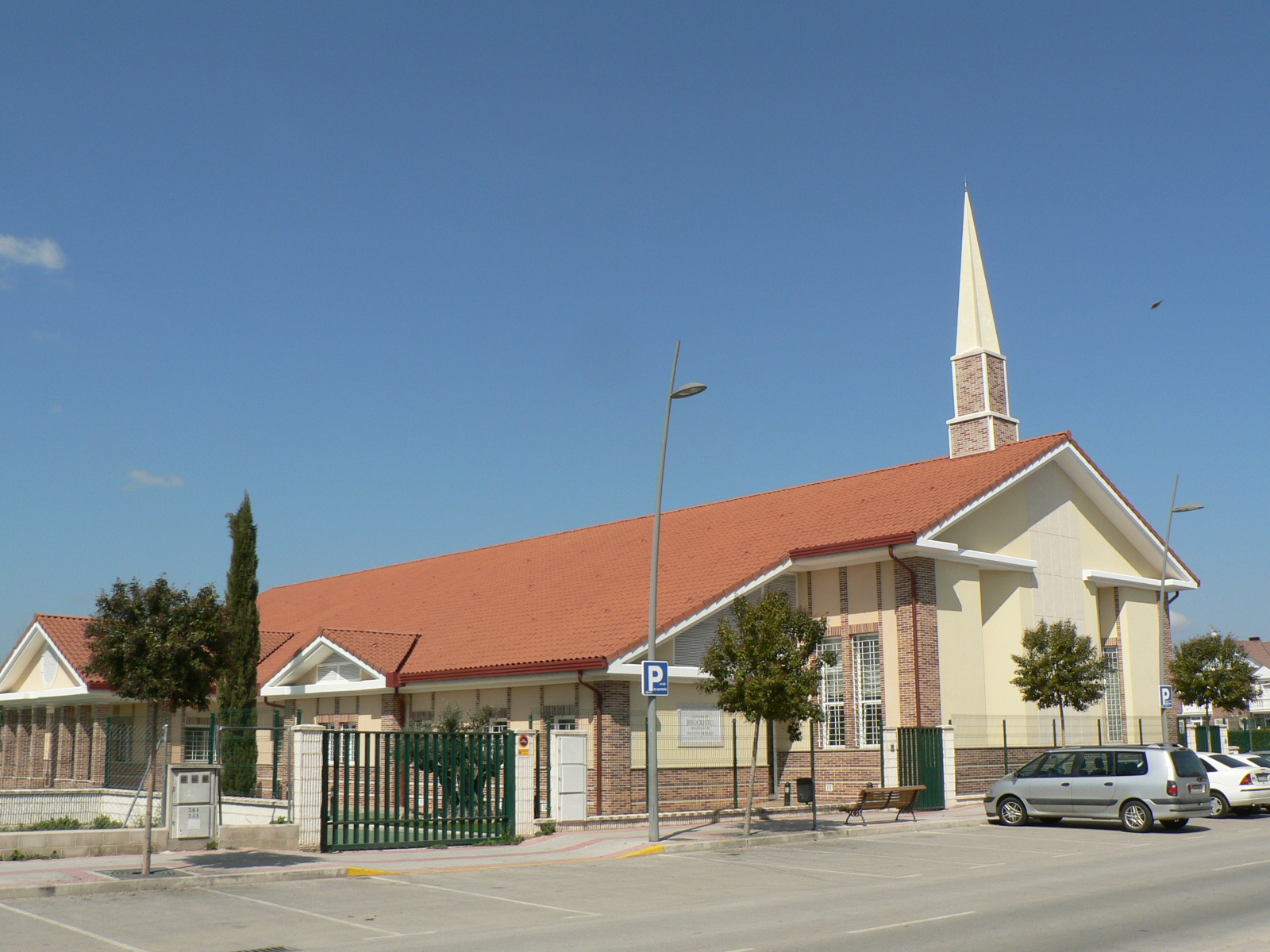
A meetinghouse for the Church of Jesus Christ of Latter-day Saints in Azuqueca de Henares.

As of Jul 2026, the LDS Church has 18 Stakes and 1 District in Spain:

Stake	Organized	Mission
A Coruña Spain Stake	5 Aug 2018	Spain Madrid North
Baleares Spain District	16 Aug 1994	Spain Barcelona
Barcelona Spain Stake	31 Oct 1982	Spain Barcelona
Cádiz Spain Stake	19 Feb 1995	Spain Madrid South
Cartagena Spain Stake	2 Dec 2012	Spain Madrid East
Elche Spain Stake	9 Nov 1997	Spain Madrid East
Granada Spain Stake	13 Jun 2004	Spain Madrid South
Granollers Spain Stake	23 Nov 2025	Spain Barcelona
Hospitalet Spain Stake	1 Jun 1997	Spain Barcelona
Las Palmas Spain Stake	2 Oct 1984	Spain Madrid North
Lléida Spain Stake	11 Nov 2012	Spain Barcelona
Madrid Spain Central Stake	2 Dec 2012	Spain Madrid South
Madrid Spain East Stake	17 Jan 1999	Spain Madrid East
Madrid Spain South Stake	23 Nov 2025	Spain Madrid South
Madrid Spain West Stake	14 Mar 1982	Spain Madrid North
Málaga Spain Stake	21 Jun 2026	Spain Madrid South
Seville Spain Stake	14 Feb 1988	Spain Madrid South
Valencia Spain Stake	8 Jun 2003	Spain Madrid East
Vitoria Spain Stake	6 Sep 2009	Spain Madrid North

== Missions ==
Mission	Organized
Spain Madrid East Mission	1 Jul 2026
Spain Madrid South Mission	11 Jul 1970
Spain Madrid North Mission	9 Aug 2022
Barcelona Mission	8 May 1976

== Temples ==
The Madrid Temple was dedicated in 1999. The temple complex includes the Madrid Spain Temple, the Spain Missionary Training Center, an institute, temple patron housing, a distribution center, a Family History Center, and underground parking.

56. Madrid Spain Temple; Official website; News & images	
Location: Announced: Groundbreaking: Dedicated: Size: Style:	Madrid, Spain; 4 April 1993 by Ezra Taft Benson; 11 June 1996 by Gordon B. Hinckley; 19 March 1999 by Gordon B. Hinckley; 45,800 sq ft (4,250 m^{2}) on a 3.5-acre (1.4 ha) site Classic modern, single-spire design - designed by Arquitechior Langdon, SA.
299. Barcelona Spain Temple (Site announced); Official website; News & images	
Location: Announced: Size:	Sant Cugat del Vallès, Spain; 3 April 2022 by Russell M. Nelson; 27,500 sq ft (2,550 m^{2}) on a 5.4-acre (2.2 ha) site

== See also ==
- Religion in Spain
