= Lisbon Portugal Temple =

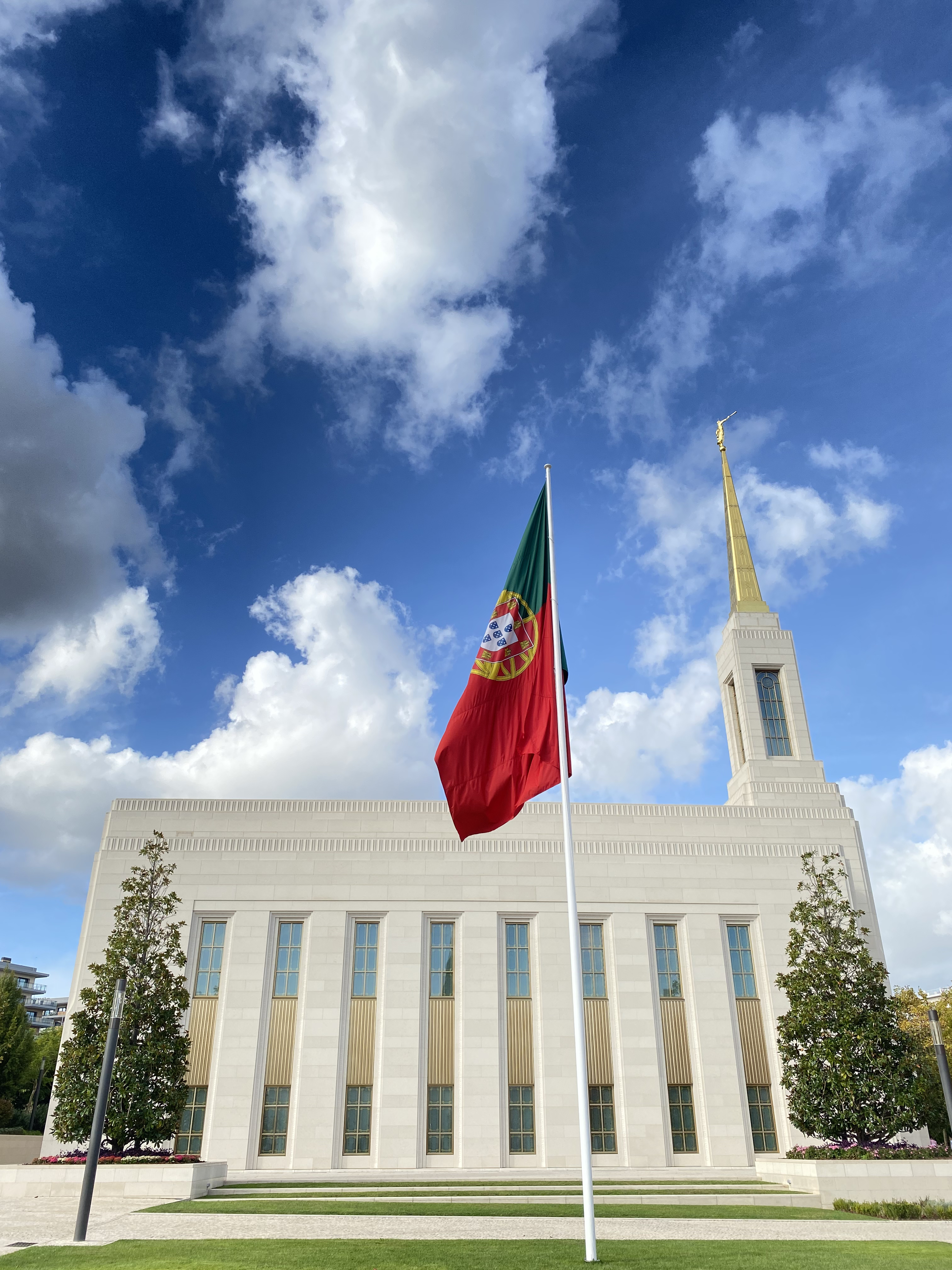
- Lisbon Portugal Temple
- Interactive map of Lisbon Portugal Temple
- Number: 166
- Dedication: 15 September 2019, by Neil L. Andersen
- Site: 4.6 acres (1.9 ha)
- Floor area: 23,730 ft^{2} (2,205 m^{2})
- Height: 143 ft (44 m)
- Official website • News & images

Church chronology
← Port-au-Prince Haiti Temple	Lisbon Portugal Temple	→ Arequipa Peru Temple

Additional information
- Announced: 2 October 2010, by Thomas S. Monson
- Groundbreaking: 5 December 2015, by Patrick Kearon
- Open house: 17-31 August 2019
- Current president: Celso Bueno Cabral
- Designed by: Simão Silva, ACS Architects
- Location: Lisbon, Portugal
- Coordinates: 38.7798°N 9.0990°W
- Baptistries: 1
- Ordinance rooms: 2
- Sealing rooms: 1
- Visitors' center: Yes

The Lisbon Portugal Temple is a temple of the Church of Jesus Christ of Latter-day Saints (LDS Church) in the Parque das Nações district of Lisbon, Portugal, in the Portuguese municipality of Lisboa. It is the first LDS temple in Portugal, and the 166th operating temple worldwide. It was announced on October, 2 2010, by Thomas S. Monson during general conference. A groundbreaking ceremony was held on December 5, 2015, presided over by Patrick Kearon, and the temple was dedicated on September 15, 2019, by Neil L. Andersen, of the church's Quorum of the Twelve Apostles.

The temple was designed using late Art Deco and modernist influences, and has an exterior of Portuguese Moleanos limestone. The interior has a color palette of gold, blue, ochre, and lavender, with some rooms featuring crystal chandeliers, azulejo‑style stained glass, and cove‑lit ceilings. The temple's 4.6‑acre site includes landscaped grounds with palm trees and flower beds. During a public open house held from 17 to 31 August 2019, over 18,000 visitors attended, including Portuguese President Marcelo Rebelo de Sousa.

== History ==
The Lisbon Portugal Temple was announced by LDS church president Thomas S. Monson on October 2, 2010, during general conference. It is the first such temple of the church in Portugal. On December 5, 2015, a groundbreaking ceremony was held on the temple site—located on a 4.6-acre plot at Avenida Dom João II in Parque das Nações, Lisbon. This ceremony, broadcast to local meetinghouses and attended by civic leaders and local members, was presided over by Patrick Kearon, then president of the church's Europe Area.

Following completion, the church announced the public open house that was held from August 17 through 31, 2019 (excluding Sundays), during which more than 18,000 visitors toured the temple, including the president of Portugal, Marcelo Rebelo de Sousa.

The temple, the church's 166th worldwide temple and 14th in Europe, on September 15, 2019, was dedicated by Neil L. Andersen of the Quorum of the Twelve Apostles.>

== Design and architecture ==
The Lisbon Portugal Temple is designed using late Art Deco and modernist architectural styles. Its exterior uses Portuguese Moleanos limestone, with the design led by Naylor Wentworth Lund Architects.

The temple is on a 4.6-acre site in the Parque das Nações district of Lisbon, a redeveloped area east of the city once used for the 1998 Lisbon World Exposition. The structure has a 134-foot spire, with a gold-leafed statue of the angel Moroni on its top. The statue is gilded in 22-karat gold, and was installed by workers in gloves to avoid smudging the surface. Tall, narrow stained-glass windows, using gold and green colors, provide geometric patterns inspired by traditional azulejo tilework.

The interior finishes have a color palette of golds, blues, ochres, and lavender. Crystal chandeliers in the sealing and celestial rooms are by Swarovski, with fixture lighting done by Crenshaw Lighting. These rooms also have high cove-lit ceilings, and stone finishes including materials from Spain, Italy, and Turkey.

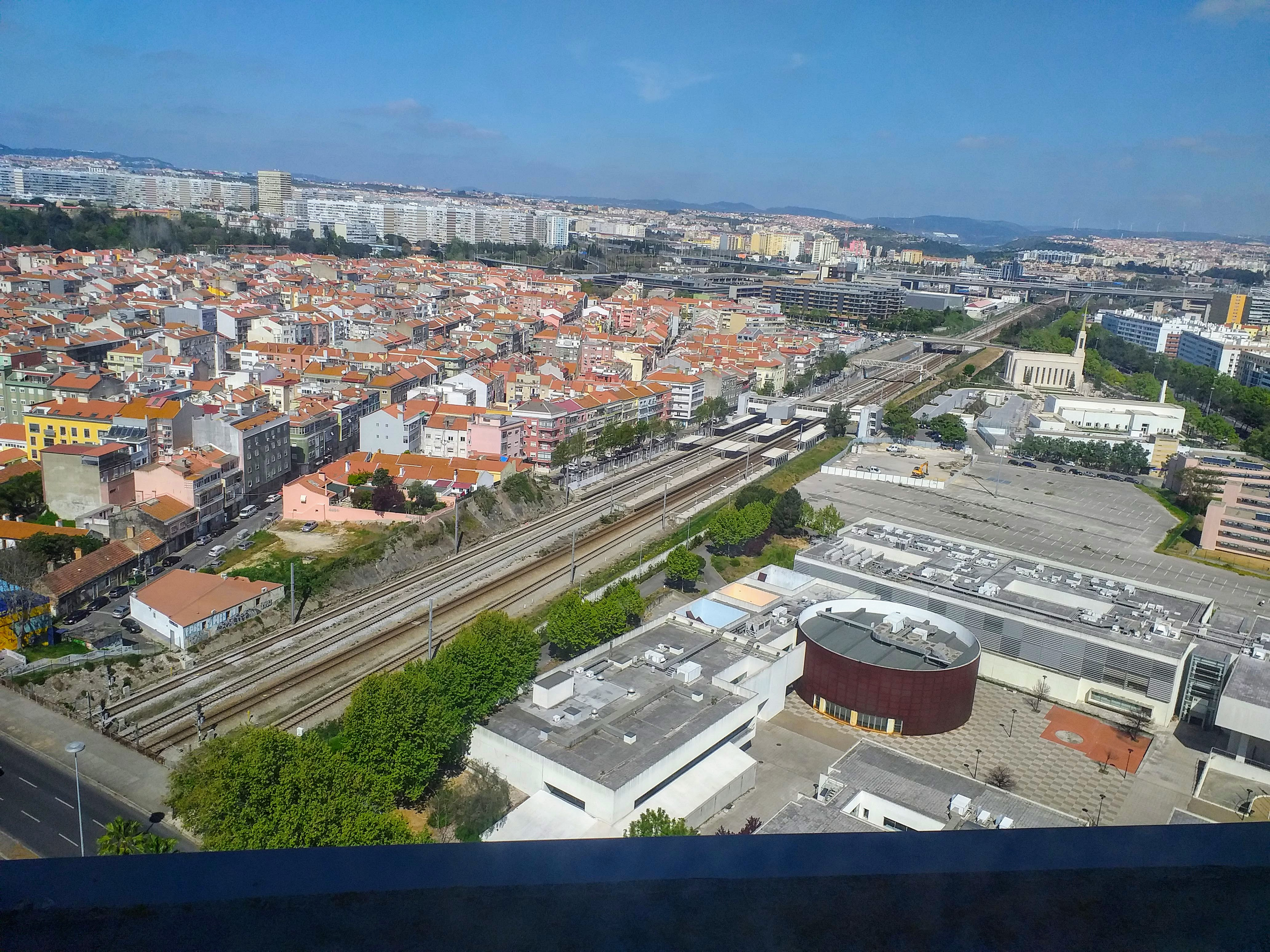
Overhead view of Lisbon Portugal Temple in Moscavide

== See also ==
- List of temples of The Church of Jesus Christ of Latter-day Saints
- The Church of Jesus Christ of Latter-day Saints in Portugal
