= The Church of Jesus Christ of Latter-day Saints in Peru =

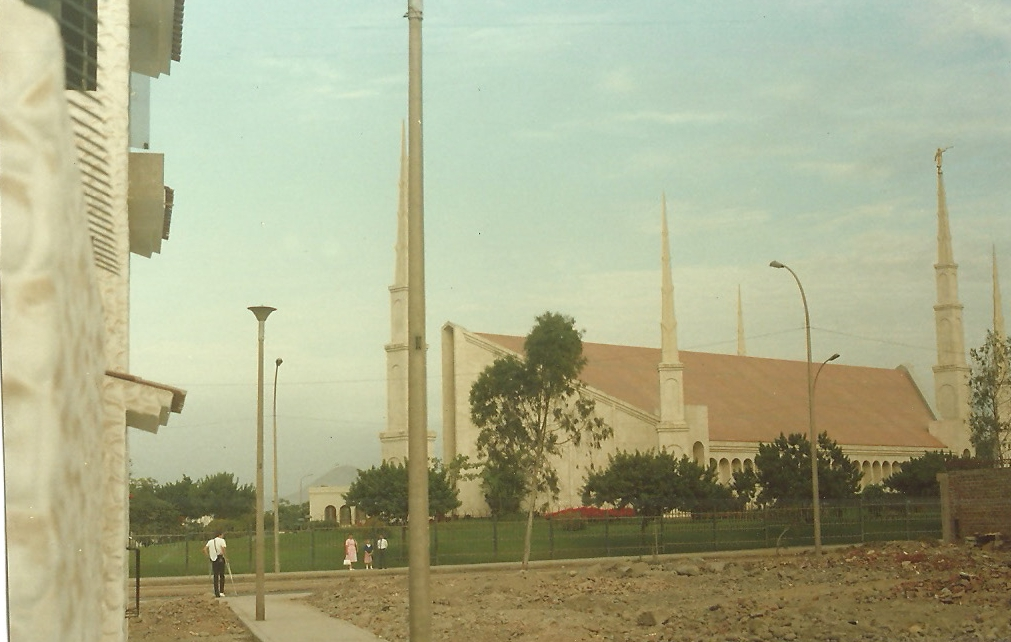
- The Lima Peru Temple in 1987
- Area: South America Northwest
- Members: 667,836 (2025)
- Stakes: 118
- Districts: 17
- Wards: 684
- Branches: 125
- Total congregations: 809
- Missions: 15
- Temples: 4 operating; 6 announced; 10 total
- FamilySearch Centers: 211

Membership in Peru
Year	Members
1960	349
1970	10,771
1980	28,696
1989	159,000
1999	333,828
2009	480,816
2019	619,045
2025	667,836
*Membership was published as a rounded number. Source: Windall J. Ashton; Jim M. Wall, Deseret News, various years, Church Almanac Country Information: Peru

The Church of Jesus Christ of Latter-day Saints in Peru refers to the Church of Jesus Christ of Latter-day Saints (LDS Church) and its members in Peru. The church's first branch in the country was established in 1956. Since then, the LDS Church in Peru has grown to more than 600,000 members in 809 congregations. Peru ranks as having the 2nd most members of the LDS Church in South America, behind Brazil, and the 5th most of countries worldwide. In addition, Peru has the third most LDS Church members per capita in South America, behind Chile and Uruguay.

== History ==
The church's first official branch in Peru was organized in July 1956.

Three native Peruvian elders were assassinated by militant groups in the early 1990s: Manuel Antonio Hidalgo and Christian Andreani Ugarte, who were killed in August 1990, and Oscar Zapata, who was killed in March 1991. Nonetheless, unlike Pentecostals and Adventists, who played critical roles in Peruvian politics of the day, the LDS Church remained relatively disengaged with the war.

At the end of 1993, one study found that there were around 234,000 Latter-day Saint adherents in Peru. This same study also found that, in Peru, there were only about 4,500 adherents per stake, the lowest density of all of the Latin American countries studied (for comparison, the highest was Colombia, which was found to have 7,500 adherents per stake). This study also found that some 44% of stakes were found within the Lima metropolitan area and 73% were found more broadly across only the coastal areas.

== Stakes and districts ==
As of October 2026, Peru had the following stakes and districts:

Stake/District	Organized	Mission	Temple
Abancay Perú Apurímac District	11-Jun-1992	Perú Cusco	Lima Perú
Andahuaylas Perú District	6-Jul-2008	Perú Cusco	Lima Perú
Arequipa Perú Central Stake	15-Sep-1991	Perú Arequipa	Arequipa Perú
Arequipa Perú Hunter Stake	25-May-1997	Perú Arequipa	Arequipa Perú
Arequipa Perú Manuel Prado Stake	20-Jun-1985	Perú Arequipa	Arequipa Perú
Arequipa Perú Paucarpata Stake	16-Oct-2011	Perú Arequipa	Arequipa Perú
Arequipa Perú Selva Alegre Stake	24-Jul-1994	Perú Arequipa	Arequipa Perú
Arequipa Perú Umacollo Stake	21-Feb-1980	Perú Arequipa	Arequipa Perú
Arequipa Perú Zamácola Stake	23-Feb-1997	Perú Arequipa	Arequipa Perú
Ayacucho Perú Stake	21-Apr-1996	Perú Lima South	Lima Perú
Barranca Perú Stake	5-Feb-1979	Perú Lima Northwest	Lima Peru Los Olivos
Cajamarca Perú Stake	13-Oct-1996	Perú Trujillo North	Trujillo Perú
Camaná Perú District	19-Jan-1993	Perú Arequipa	Arequipa Perú
Cañete Perú Stake	22-Jun-2025	Perú Lima South	Lima Perú
Casa Grande Perú Stake	8-Sep-1987	Perú Trujillo North	Trujillo Perú
Casma Perú District	16-Oct-2011	Perú Trujillo South	Trujillo Perú
Cerro de Pasco Perú Stake	21-Jan-1996	Perú Huancayo	Lima Perú
Chiclayo Perú Central Stake	27-Oct-1985	Perú Chiclayo	Trujillo Perú
Chiclayo Perú El Dorado Stake	20-Oct-1991	Perú Chiclayo	Trujillo Perú
Chiclayo Perú Federico Villarreal Stake	13-Oct-2019	Perú Chiclayo	Trujillo Perú
Chiclayo Perú La Victoria Stake	3-Nov-1996	Perú Chiclayo	Trujillo Perú
Chiclayo Perú Latina Stake	29-Oct-1995	Perú Chiclayo	Trujillo Perú
Chiclayo Perú Stake	8-Jun-1980	Perú Chiclayo	Trujillo Perú
Chimbote Perú Buenos Aires Stake	22-Feb-2009	Perú Trujillo South	Trujillo Perú
Chimbote Perú South Stake	17-Mar-1991	Perú Trujillo South	Trujillo Perú
Chimbote Perú Stake	23-Mar-1980	Perú Trujillo South	Trujillo Perú
Chincha Perú Stake	8-May-1992	Perú Lima South	Lima Perú
Cusco Perú Inti Raymi Stake	15-Nov-1992	Perú Cusco	Arequipa Perú
Cusco Perú Stake	28-Apr-1985	Perú Cusco	Arequipa Perú
Guadalupe Perú La Libertad District	8-Sep-1987	Perú Trujillo North	Trujillo Perú
Huacho Perú Stake	4-Jun-1989	Perú Lima Northwest	Lima Perú Los Olivos
Huancayo Perú El Valle Stake	28-Jan-2018	Perú Huancayo	Lima Perú
Huancayo Perú Stake	6-May-1984	Perú Huancayo	Lima Perú
Huánuco Perú Amarilis Stake	17-Dec-1995	Perú Huancayo	Lima Perú
Huánuco Perú Stake	17-Jun-1990	Perú Huancayo	Lima Perú
Huánuco Perú Viña del Río Stake	30-Nov-2025	Perú Huancayo	Lima Perú
Huaral Perú District	24-Mar-2024	Perú Lima Northwest	Lima Perú Los Olivos
Huaraz Perú Stake	16-Dec-1989	Perú Trujillo South	Trujillo Perú
Ica Perú Stake	17-Dec-1989	Perú Lima South	Lima Perú
Ilo Perú Stake	23-Apr-1995	Perú Tacna	Arequipa Perú
Iquitos Perú Nueve de Octubre Stake	26-Nov-1995	Perú Iquitos	Lima Perú Los Olivos
Iquitos Perú Punchana Stake	23-May-1992	Perú Iquitos	Lima Perú Los Olivos
Iquitos Perú San Juan Stake	21-May-2023	Perú Iquitos	Lima Perú
Iquitos Perú Stake	3-Aug-1980	Perú Iquitos	Lima Perú Los Olivos
Jaén Perú Stake	4-Nov-2007	Perú Chiclayo	Trujillo Perú
Juliaca Perú Stake	18-Dec-1994	Perú Cusco	Arequipa Perú
La Merced Perú Stake	26-Aug-2007	Perú Huancayo	Lima Perú
Lambayeque Perú District	22-Apr-2012	Perú Chiclayo	Trujillo Perú
Lima Perú Begonias Stake	17-Mar-2019	Perú Lima Northeast	Lima Perú Los Olivos
Lima Perú Callao Stake	16-Sep-1979	Perú Lima Central	Lima Perú Los Olivos
Lima Perú Campoy Stake	18-May-1997	Perú Lima Northeast	Lima Perú
Lima Perú Canto Grande Stake	18-Mar-1990	Perú Lima Northeast	Lima Perú Los Olivos
Lima Perú Carabayllo Stake	17-Mar-1996	Perú Lima North	Lima Perú Los Olivos
Lima Perú Central Stake	21-Nov-1976	Perú Lima Northeast	Lima Perú
Lima Perú Chaclacayo Stake	18-Sep-2011	Perú Lima East	Lima Perú
Lima Perú Chorrillos Stake	31-Jan-1988	Perú Lima Limatambo	Lima Perú
Lima Perú Chosica Stake	5-May-1991	Perú Lima East	Lima Perú
Lima Perú Comas Stake	31-Jan-1988	Perú Lima North	Lima Perú Los Olivos
Lima Perú Condevilla Stake	19-Apr-2009	Perú Lima West	Lima Perú Los Olivos
Lima Perú El Olivar Stake	31-Jan-1988	Perú Lima West	Lima Perú Los Olivos
Lima Perú El Trébol Stake	7-Sep-2003	Perú Lima West	Lima Perú Los Olivos
Lima Perú Independencia Stake	21-Nov-1976	Perú Lima Central	Lima Perú Los Olivos
Lima Perú La Campiña Stake	10-Mar-2019	Perú Lima South	Lima Perú
Lima Perú La Libertad Stake	21-Jun-2009	Perú Lima Central	Lima Perú Los Olivos
Lima Perú La Molina Stake	5-Jan-1997	Perú Lima East	Lima Perú
Lima Perú La Victoria	18-May-2025	Perú Lima Limatambo	Lima Perú
Lima Perú Las Flores Stake	31-Jan-1988	Perú Lima Northeast	Lima Perú Los Olivos
Lima Perú Las Palmeras Stake	31-Jan-1988	Perú Lima West	Lima Perú Los Olivos
Lima Perú Limatambo Stake	22-Feb-1970	Perú Lima Limatambo	Lima Perú
Lima Perú Los Olivos Stake	20-Sep-2009	Perú Lima West	Lima Perú Los Olivos
Lima Perú Magnolias Stake	30-Aug-2009	Perú Lima Northeast	Lima Perú Los Olivos
Lima Perú Maranga Stake	31-Jan-1988	Perú Lima Central	Lima Perú Los Olivos
Lima Perú Mayorazgo Stake	14-Oct-2018	Perú Lima East	Lima Perú
Lima Perú Miramar Stake	16-Jun-2019	Perú Lima Northwest	Lima Perú Los Olivos
Lima Perú Naranjal Stake	30-Jun-2019	Perú Lima West	Lima Perú Los Olivos
Lima Perú Pachacamac Stake	2-Jun-2013	Perú Lima South	Lima Perú
Lima Perú Palao Stake	1-Jul-1984	Perú Lima West	Lima Perú Los Olivos
Lima Perú Prolima Stake	20-Sep-2009	Perú Lima Northwest	Lima Perú Los Olivos
Lima Perú Pueblo Libre Stake	1-Dec-1974	Perú Lima Central	Lima Perú Los Olivos
Lima Perú Puente Piedra Stake	16-Feb-2003	Perú Lima Northwest	Lima Perú Los Olivos
Lima Perú Rímac Stake	16-Jun-1996	Perú Lima Central	Lima Perú Los Olivos
Lima Perú San Felipe Stake	11-Sep-1983	Perú Lima North	Lima Perú Los Olivos
Lima Perú San Gabriel Stake	24-Mar-1996	Perú Lima Limatambo	Lima Perú
Lima Perú San Juan Stake	16-Sep-1979	Perú Lima Limatambo	Lima Perú
Lima Perú San Luis Stake	11-Sep-1983	Perú Lima Limatambo	Lima Perú
Lima Perú San Martín Stake	16-Sep-1979	Perú Lima Central	Lima Perú Los Olivos
Lima Perú Santa Anita Stake	17-Dec-1995	Perú Lima East	Lima Perú
Lima Perú Santa Clara Stake	11-Aug-2019	Perú Lima East	Lima Perú
Lima Perú Santa Isabel Stake	15-Jun-1997	Perú Lima North	Lima Perú Los Olivos
Lima Perú Santa Patricia Stake	30-Jun-2013	Perú Lima Limatambo	Lima Perú
Lima Perú Surco Stake	24-Mar-1996	Perú Lima Limatambo	Lima Perú
Lima Perú Tahuantinsuyo Stake	5-May-1991	Perú Lima North	Lima Perú Los Olivos
Lima Perú Torre Blanca Stake	1-Jul-2018	Perú Lima North	Lima Perú Los Olivos
Lima Perú Villa María Stake	25-Aug-1985	Perú Lima South	Lima Perú
Lima Perú Villa Salvador Stake	31-May-1992	Perú Lima South	Lima Perú
Lima Perú Vitarte Stake	31-Jan-1988	Perú Lima East	Lima Perú
Lima Perú Wiesse Stake	7-Mar-1993	Perú Lima Northeast	Lima Perú Los Olivos
Majes Perú District	17-Jul-2016	Perú Arequipa	Arequipa Perú
Mantaro Perú Stake	30-Jul-1989	Perú Huancayo	Lima Perú
Mollendo Perú District	3-May-1991	Perú Tacna	Arequipa Perú
Moquegua Perú Stake	18-Dec-1994	Perú Tacna	Arequipa Perú
Moyobamba Perú District	17-Apr-1994	Perú Iquitos	Trujillo Perú
Nazca Perú District	12-Feb-1985	Perú Lima South	Lima Perú
Paita Perú Stake	26-Mar-1995	Perú Piura	Trujillo Perú
Pisco Perú Stake	13-Mar-1993	Perú Lima South	Lima Perú
Piura Perú Castilla Stake	17-Jun-1990	Perú Piura	Trujillo Perú
Piura Perú Central Stake	16-Feb-1983	Perú Piura	Trujillo Perú
Piura Perú Primavera Stake	25-Oct-2026	Perú Piura	Trujillo Perú
Piura Perú Miraflores Stake	10-Mar-1996	Perú Piura	Trujillo Perú
Pomalca Perú Stake	2-Dec-2007	Perú Chiclayo	Trujillo Perú
Pucallpa Perú Centenario Stake	5-Mar-2023	Perú Iquitos	Lima Perú
Pucallpa Perú Stake	5-Dec-1993	Perú Iquitos	Lima Perú
Puerto Maldonado Perú District	6-Sep-1992	Perú Cusco	Lima Perú
Puno Perú Bellavista Stake	26-Nov-1995	Perú Cusco	Arequipa Perú
Puno Perú Central Stake	31-May-1992	Perú Cusco	Arequipa Perú
Quillabamba Perú Cuzco District	11-Jun-1992	Perú Cusco	Lima Perú
Sicuani Perú Stake	10-Dec-2006	Perú Cusco	Arequipa Perú
Sullana Perú Stake	9-Dec-2007	Perú Piura	Trujillo Perú
Tacna Perú Alameda Stake	15-Sep-1996	Perú Tacna	Arequipa Perú
Tacna Perú Arias Aragüez Stake	6-Dec-1992	Perú Tacna	Arequipa Perú
Tacna Perú Stake	13-Feb-1983	Perú Tacna	Arequipa Perú
Talara Perú District	5-Apr-1988	Perú Piura	Trujillo Perú
Tarapoto Perú Stake	28-Oct-1990	Perú Iquitos	Trujillo Perú
Tarma Perú District	4-Jan-1986	Perú Huancayo	Lima Perú
Trujillo Perú Central Stake	14-Aug-1994	Perú Trujillo North	Trujillo Perú
Trujillo Perú East Stake	16-Jun-1991	Perú Trujillo North	Trujillo Perú
Trujillo Perú Esperanza Stake	18-Jan-1998	Perú Trujillo North	Trujillo Perú
Trujillo Perú Jerusalén Stake	30-Apr-2023	Perú Trujillo North	Trujillo Perú
Trujillo Perú Laureles Stake	18-Jan-1998	Perú Trujillo South	Trujillo Perú
Trujillo Perú Palermo Stake	12-Aug-1984	Perú Trujillo South	Trujillo Perú
Trujillo Perú Porvenir Stake	19-Apr-1998	Perú Trujillo North	Trujillo Perú
Trujillo Perú Primavera Stake	22-Jan-1978	Perú Trujillo North	Trujillo Perú
Tumbes Perú Stake	4-Nov-2007	Perú Piura	Trujillo Perú
Valle Sagrado Perú District	21-Sep-1997	Perú Cusco	Arequipa Perú
Ventanilla Perú Stake	8-Sep-1996	Perú Lima Northwest	Lima Perú Los Olivos
Virú Perú District	6-Apr-1997	Perú Trujillo South	Trujillo Perú

== Missions ==
Mission	Organized
Perú Arequipa	1 Jul 1978
Perú Chiclayo	1 Jul 2011
Perú Cusco	1 Jul 2010
Perú Huancayo	1 Jul 2013
Perú Iquitos	1 Jul 2013
Perú Lima Central	1 Jul 1994
Perú Lima East	1 Jul 1985
Perú Lima North	1 Jan 1977
Perú Lima Northeast	1 July 2024
Perú Lima Northwest	1 July 2026
Perú Lima South	1 Nov 1959
Perú Lima West	1 Jul 2010
Perú Limatambo	1 Jul 2019
Perú Piura*	1 Jul 1993
Perú Tacna	1 July 2026
Perú Trujillo North	1 Jul 1988
Perú Trujillo South	1 Jul 2015

== Temples ==

Temples in and near Peru; Lima
= Operating
= Under construction
= Announced
= Temporarily Closed

38. Lima Peru Temple; Official website; News & images	
Location: Announced: Groundbreaking: Dedicated: Size: Style:	La Molina, Lima, Peru; 1 April 1981 by Spencer W. Kimball; 11 September 1982 by Boyd K. Packer; 10 January 1986 by Gordon B. Hinckley; 9,600 sq ft (890 m^{2}) on a 4.5-acre (1.8 ha) site Modern adaptation of six-spire design - designed by Jesse M. Harris
147. Trujillo Peru Temple; Official website; News & images	
Location: Announced: Groundbreaking: Dedicated: Size:	Trujillo, Peru; 13 December 2008 by Thomas S. Monson; 14 September 2011 by Rafael E. Pino; 21 June 2015 by Dieter F. Uchtdorf; 28,200 sq ft (2,620 m^{2}) on a 8.9-acre (3.6 ha) site
167. Arequipa Peru Temple; Official website; News & images	
Location: Announced: Groundbreaking: Dedicated: Size:	Arequipa, Peru; 6 October 2012 by Thomas S. Monson; 4 March 2017 by Carlos A. Godoy; 15 December 2019 by Ulisses Soares; 26,969 sq ft (2,505.5 m^{2}) on a 7.91-acre (3.20 ha) site
187. Lima Peru Los Olivos Temple; Official website; News & images	
Location: Announced: Groundbreaking: Dedicated: Size:	San Martin de Porres, Lima, Peru; 3 April 2016 by Thomas S. Monson; 8 June 2019 by Enrique R. Falabella; 14 January 2024 by D. Todd Christofferson; 47,413 sq ft (4,404.8 m^{2}) on a 2.46-acre (1.00 ha) site
310. Cusco Peru Temple (Site announced); Official website; News & images	
Location: Announced: Size:	Cusco, Peru; 3 April 2022 by Russell M. Nelson; 9,950 sq ft (924 m^{2}) on a 2.48-acre (1.00 ha) site
314. Chiclayo Peru Temple (Announced); Official website; News & images	
Location: Announced:	Chiclayo, Peru; 2 October 2022 by Russell M. Nelson
289. Iquitos Peru Temple (Under construction); Official website; News & images	
Location: Announced: Groundbreaking: Size:	Iquitos, Peru; 2 April 2023 by Russell M. Nelson; 10 October 2026 by Sandino Roman; 20,000 sq ft (1,900 m^{2}) on a 1.75-acre (0.71 ha) site
293. Piura Peru Temple (Groundbreaking scheduled); Official website; News & images	
Location: Announced: Groundbreaking: Size:	Piura, Peru; 1 October 2023 by Russell M. Nelson scheduled for 14 November 2026 by Steven C. Barlow; 18,850 sq ft (1,751 m^{2}) on a 2.6-acre (1.1 ha) site
331. Huancayo Peru Temple (Announced); Official website; News & images	
Location: Announced:	Huancayo, Peru; 1 October 2023 by Russell M. Nelson
369. Chorrillos Peru Temple (Announced); Official website; News & images	
Location: Announced:	Chorrillos, Peru; 6 April 2025 by Russell M. Nelson

== See also ==
- Religion in Peru
