= Lima Peru Los Olivos Temple =

Temple of the Church of Jesus Christ of Latter-day Saints in Lima, Peru

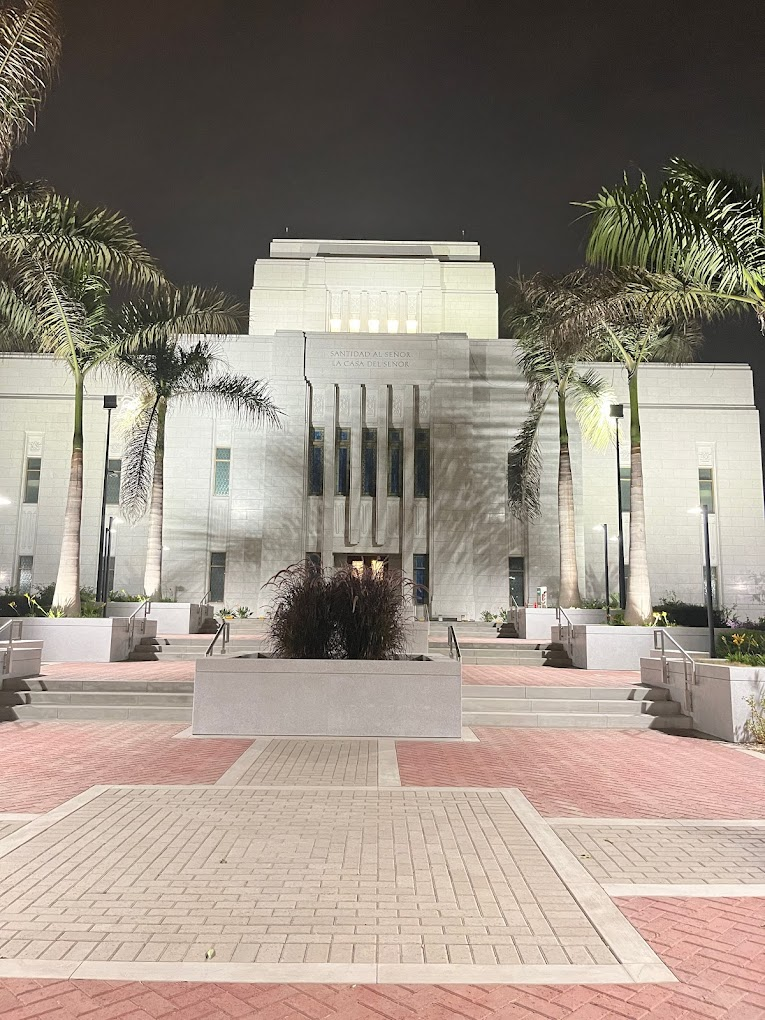
- Interactive map of Lima Peru Los Olivos Temple
- Number: 187
- Dedication: 14 January 2024, by D. Todd Christofferson
- Site: 2.46 acres (1.00 ha)
- Floor area: 47,413 ft^{2} (4,404.8 m^{2})
- Height: 125 ft (38 m)
- Official website • News & images

Church chronology
← Okinawa Japan Temple	Lima Peru Los Olivos Temple	→ Orem Utah Temple

Additional information
- Announced: 3 April 2016, by Thomas S. Monson
- Groundbreaking: 8 June 2019, by Enrique R. Falabella
- Open house: 10 November-9 December 2023
- Current president: José Alfonso Li De La Cruz
- Location: San Martin de Porres, Lima, Peru
- Coordinates: 12°01′12″S 77°03′15″W
- Baptistries: 1

The Lima Peru Los Olivos Temple is a temple of the Church of Jesus Christ of Latter-day Saints in the San Martin de Porres district, Lima, Peru. The temple was dedicated by D. Todd Christofferson of the Quorum of the Twelve Apostles on January 14, 2024.

== History ==
The intent to construct the temple was announced by church president Thomas S. Monson on April 3, 2016, during the church's general conference. The Quito Ecuador, Belém Brazil, and Harare Zimbabwe temples were announced at the same time. The church later announced the second temple in Lima would be named the Lima Peru Los Olivos Temple. Los Olivos is Spanish for "The Olives." It is the fourth operating temple in Peru. As of 2024, there are five additional announced temples in the planning and design phase. Lima is the first city outside the United States to have two operating temples in the same city, along with South Jordan and Provo in Utah.

On March 7, 2019, the church announced a groundbreaking would be held on June 8, 2019, with Enrique R. Falabella, president of the church's South America Northwest Area, presiding. When the first temple in Lima was dedicated, the temple district had 119,000 members. As of December 31, 2022, the church reported approximately 630,000 members spread throughout 780 congregations in Peru, with 112 stakes, 48 of those stakes in Lima. As of 2024, the city of Lima has a population of 11 million.

== Design ==
The temple measures at 47,413 square feet (4,404.8 m^{2}), stands at about 81 feet (25 m) tall, and the site is 2.46 acres (1.00 ha).

Landscaping on the site includes evergreen and palm trees, along with smaller plants like succulents, perennials, and cantutas. It also has four mature olive trees, reflecting the Spanish name of the temple's location. The site includes two housing units, one for those attending the temple and the other for missionaries, along with an underground parking garage.

The building is made of a precast concrete with a simplified art deco architectural style and was designed without a spire to match the surrounding buildings. The temple has a symmetrical light gray design with rectangular windows, with a flat-topped tower with a skylight above the celestial room.

The interior has carvings and paintings of olive branches, along with the symbol of the scroll (a baroque motif), used elsewhere in Peru's civic and religious buildings. Multiple elements in the interior include the design of the cantuta flower, including carpets made by hand, and art-glass windows.

== Access ==
Following construction, a public open house was held from November 10 to December 9, 2023 (excluding Sundays). On November 6, 2023, prior to the public open house beginning, journalists toured the temple on a media day. The temple was dedicated on January 14, 2024, by D. Todd Christofferson. Access to the temple is limited to church members with a current temple recommend.

== See also ==
Peru Temples

Temples in and near Peru
= Operating
= Under construction
= Announced
= Temporarily Closed

- Lima Peru Temple
- The Church of Jesus Christ of Latter-day Saints in Peru
- List of temples of The Church of Jesus Christ of Latter-day Saints
- List of temples of The Church of Jesus Christ of Latter-day Saints by geographic region
- Comparison of temples of The Church of Jesus Christ of Latter-day Saints
- Temple architecture (Latter-day Saints)
