= Orem Utah Temple =

Latter-day Saint temple in the United States

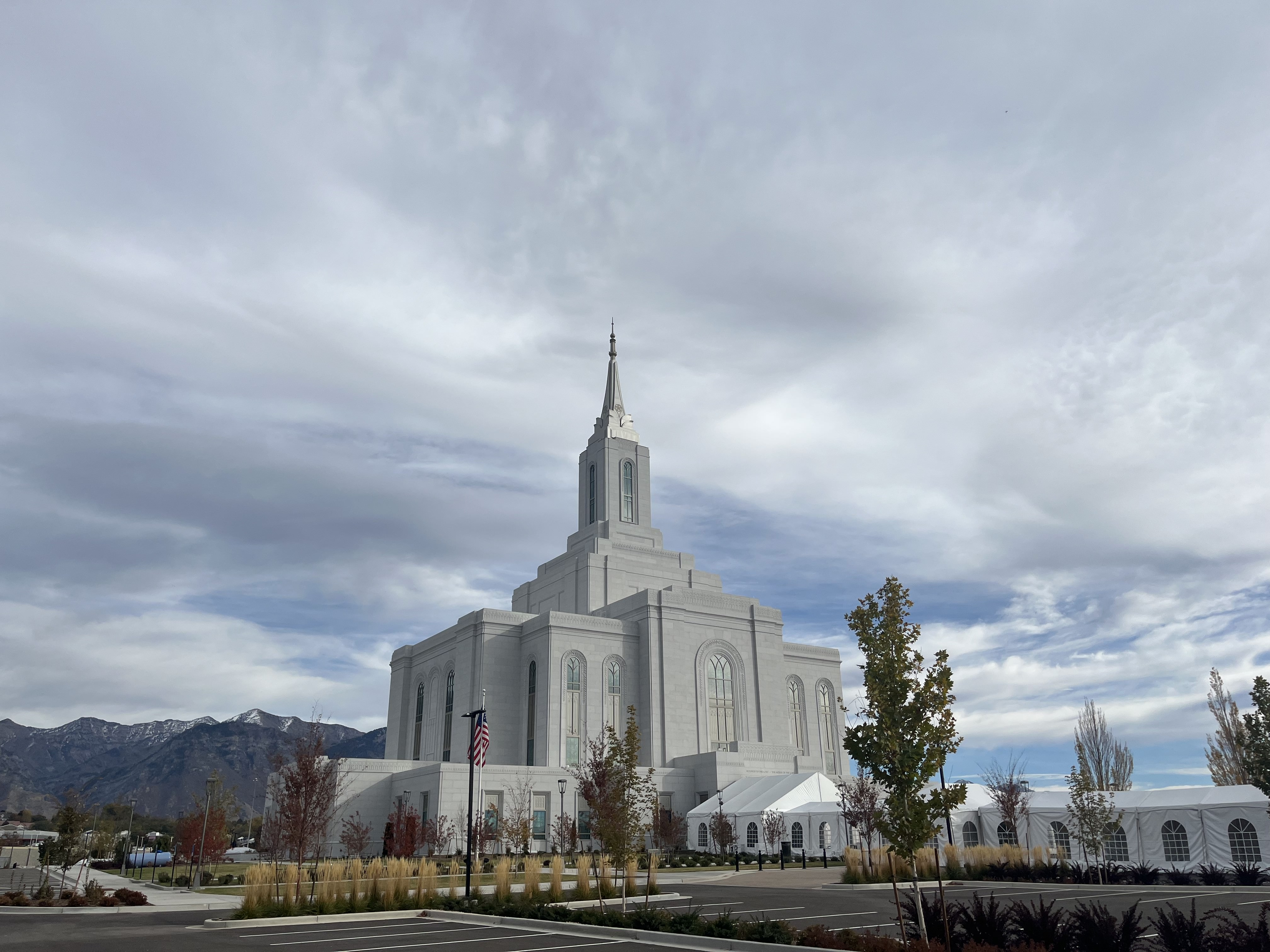
- Interactive map of Orem Utah Temple
- Number: 188
- Dedication: 21 January 2024, by D. Todd Christofferson
- Site: 15.39 acres (6.23 ha)
- Floor area: 71,998 ft^{2} (6,688.8 m^{2})
- Official website • News & images

Church chronology
← Lima Peru Los Olivos Temple	Orem Utah Temple	→ Red Cliffs Utah Temple

Additional information
- Announced: 5 October 2019, by Russell M. Nelson
- Groundbreaking: 5 September 2020, by Craig C. Christensen
- Open house: 27 October-16 December 2023
- Current president: Kenneth Lee Sorber
- Location: Orem, Utah, United States
- Coordinates: 40.2708°N 111.7193°W
- Baptistries: 1
- Ordinance rooms: 4
- Sealing rooms: 4

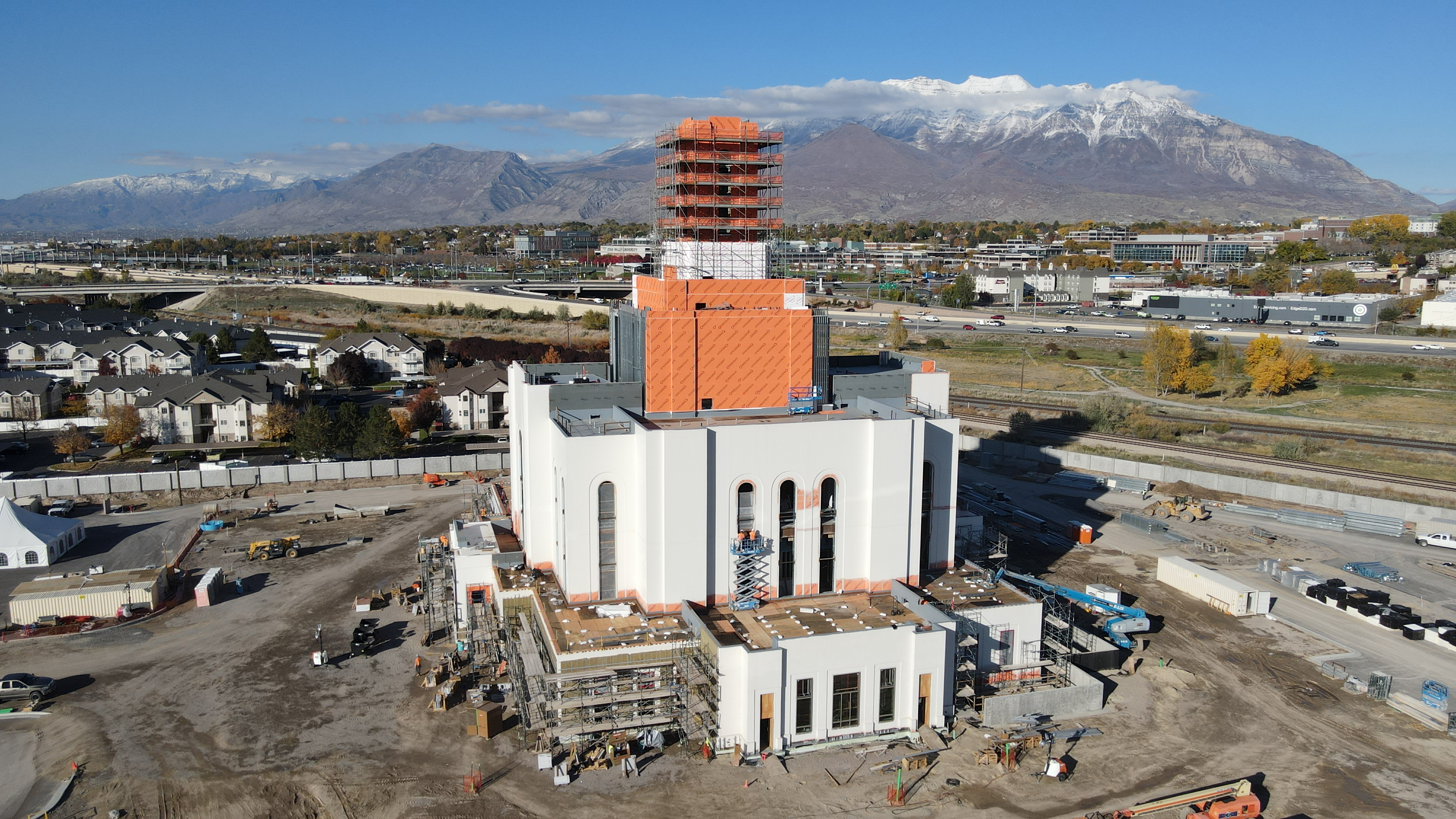
Orem Utah Temple under construction

The Orem Utah Temple is a temple of the Church of Jesus Christ of Latter-day Saints located in Orem, Utah. The intent to build the temple was announced on October 5, 2019, by church president Russell M. Nelson, during the church's general conference. The temple is the first in the city of Orem, the sixth in Utah County, and the 19th in the state of Utah.

On December 11, 2019, it was announced the temple would be built on a 15.39 acres (6.23 ha) site owned by the church. The site is south of Interstate 15's University Parkway exit on Geneva Road, near the Orem UTA Frontrunner station. The site includes the three-story, 70,000 sq ft (6,500 m^{2}) temple and a separate 20,000 sq ft (1,900 m^{2}) meetinghouse. With its completion, Utah County is now the county with the most temples in the state. It is the third temple in a four-mile radius, and the 188th in the church.

== History ==
The intent to build the Orem Temple was announced by Russell M. Nelson, along with seven other temples, in 2019, during the women's session of general conference. This was the first time new temples had been announced in a women's session. On December 11, 2019, the church announced that the temple would be built on a 15.39 acres (6.23 ha) site. The site was originally owned by a Norwegian pioneer family that had a fruit orchard farm for generations, with their descendants selling the land to the church in 2004. On June 24, 2020, the church released a building rendering and announced that a groundbreaking would be held on September 5, 2020, with Craig C. Christensen, president of the church's Utah Area, presiding. It was anticipated construction would take three years, with completion expected by fall of 2023. The site plan included a three-story, 70,000 sq ft (6,500 m^{2}) building and a separate 20,000 sq ft (1,900 m^{2}) meetinghouse.

On July 25, 2022, a fire broke out in a utility room on the third floor of the temple. The Orem Fire Department put out the fire using mostly foam to limit water damage to the structure. On September 6, the Bureau of Alcohol, Tobacco, Firearms and Explosives announced the fire was being investigated as an arson, and offered a cash reward for information leading to the arrest and conviction of those responsible.

By October 2023, construction was completed, with journalists and other guests initially touring the temple, beginning on October 23, 2023. In December 2023, Yahya Cholil Staquf, the leader of the world's largest Islamic organization, visited the Orem Temple with his delegation. The temple also gave "tactile tours," which was meant to allow those with visual disabilities to interact with textures and patterns of the temple. The temple was also built to accommodate local college age students, with a collective total of 80,000 students at both Brigham Young University and Utah Valley University (UVU). The temple is the first in the city of Orem, sixth in Utah County, and the 28th in Utah.

=== Dedication ===
D. Todd Christofferson dedicated the temple in two sessions on January 21, 2024, one week after he dedicated the Lima Peru Los Olivos Temple. Among others participating, Christofferson was joined by fellow apostle Patrick Kearon. Christofferson stated the temple “marks a milestone in the progress of the kingdom of God on the Earth, and particularly in this vital part of His vineyard.” He noted the history of the area, named for Walter C. Orem, president of the electric railroad that used to travel between Salt Lake City and Provo. A decade after being settled, the first stake in the area was created as the Sharon Stake. Growth described as “explosive” led to the creation of more stakes and eventually a mission in Orem.

== Property and design ==
Located in Orem's Lake View area, the 71,998 sq ft (6,688.8 m^{2}) temple is on nearly 16 acres (6.5 ha) of property near UVU. The site is south of Interstate 15's University Parkway exit on Geneva Road. Originally, a Norwegian pioneer family owned the property, which their descendants farmed until the church purchased the land in 2004. The land was originally used for fruit orchard farming, and the design features many motifs that reflect local history, such as elements of both cherry blossoms and trees as a repeating theme. Due to traffic demands, the city announced it will build a five lane road leading to the temple, along with greater access for pedestrians and cyclists. The Utah legislature approved $25 million for the project, and construction is estimated to last from fall 2024 until winter 2025.

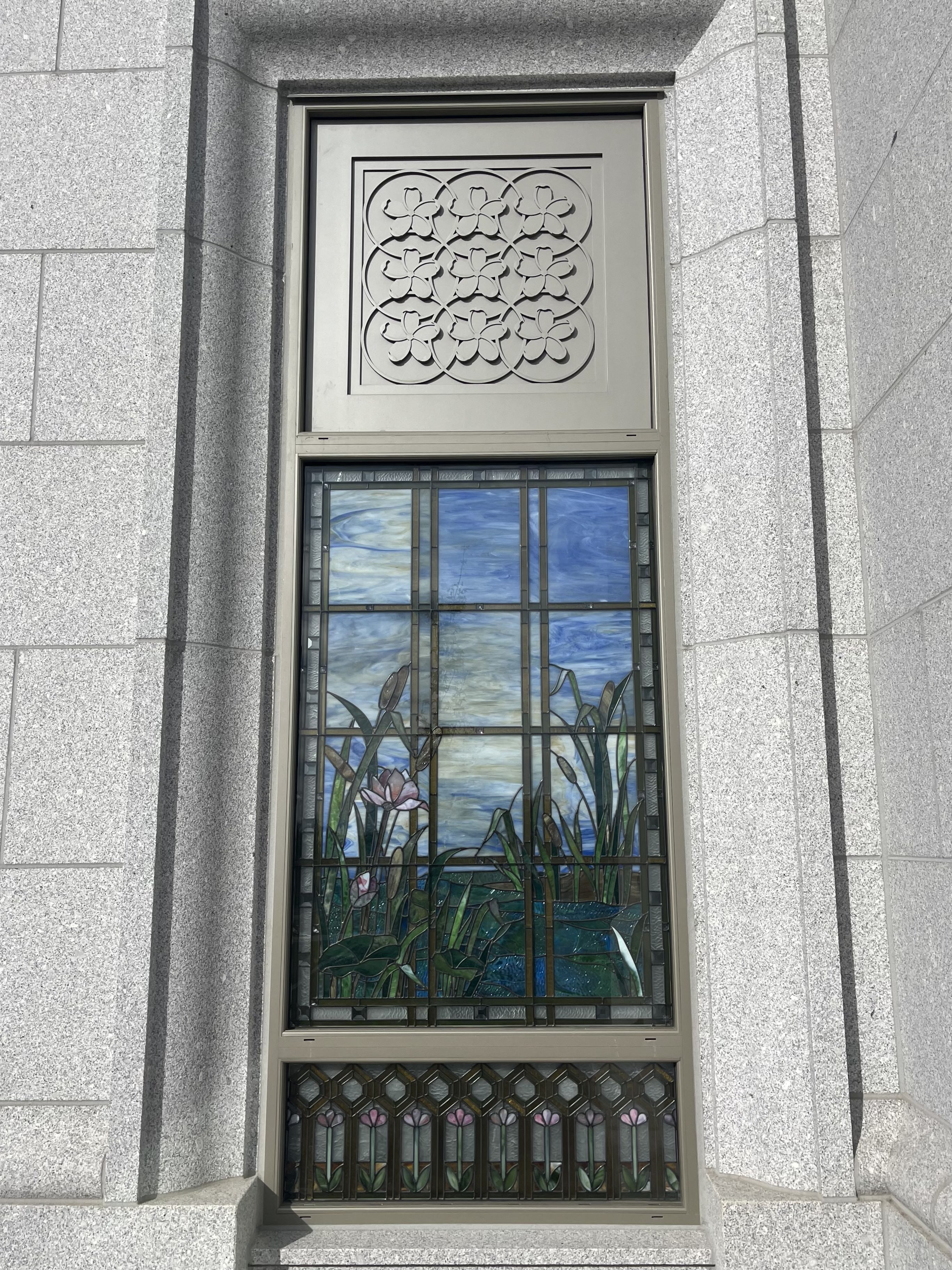
Stained glass on the first floor of the Orem Utah Temple, featuring designs of local cherry blossoms to reflect the region's agricultural history.

=== Stained glass ===
The stained glass windows for the Orem Temple were designed by Tom Holdman and his team, working with representatives from the church and FFKR Architects. The city of Orem has an extensive agricultural history, including orchards producing cherries, peaches, apples, pears and apricots. Part of the design process involved his team studying the culture, architecture, art, and natural surroundings of the temple. Of the design choice, Holdman said: "We felt moved that it was the cherry that was going to be most important for the theme of the temple."

After reaching consensus, the team developed conceptual designs that progressed from pen and pencil drafts to watercolors, culminating in the finished glass design. Cherry tree blossoms and branches are part of the main design on the two upper windows of the temple, and the cherries and leaves were meant to represent all seasons of a person's life. On the first floor in a large stairwell, stained glass depicts branches with pink springtime buds, full pink blossoms on the second floor, and bright red cherries on the top floor. While on a tour during the public open house, a journalist suggested that the top floor, with the sealing and celestial rooms, "represented the fulness of the temple's blessings." Features in the windows are designed to reflect elements throughout the temple, including light fixtures, carpeting, and stonework. The consistency was designed to help patrons experience harmony and peace.

=== Exterior ===
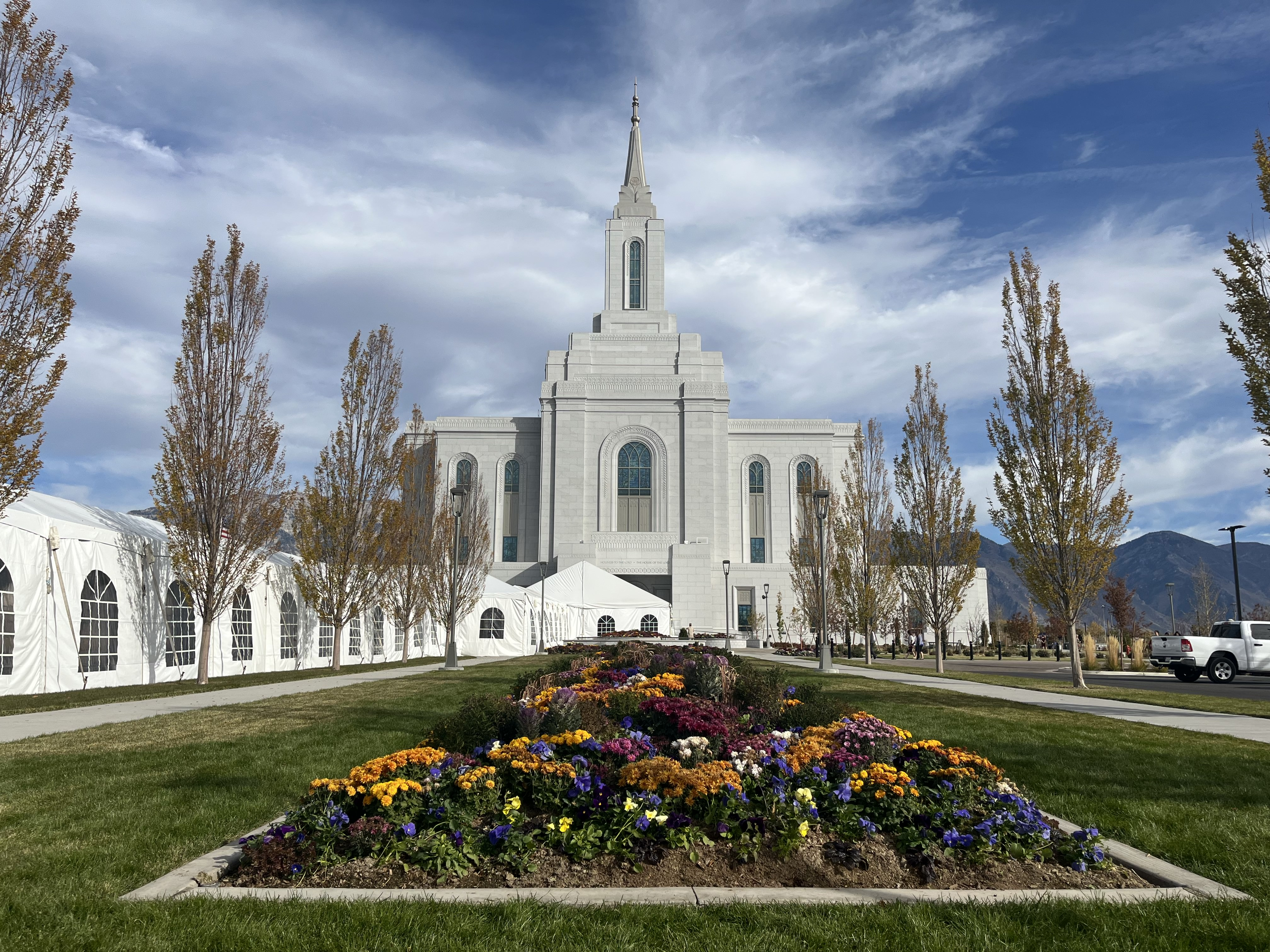
The front of the Orem Utah Temple

The temple, designed in an Art Nouveau style, features classical architecture proportioning and symmetry. The temple's exterior is paneled with white Portuguese granite, and light-colored bronze doors complement the window frames and paneling. Each story has glass art design; the design on the first story mirrors nearby wetlands, containing elements of water, cat-tails, bullrushes, grasses, and a scene with a dragonfly and a snowy egret. The second and third story windows have cherry tree elements with blossoms, fruit, and leaves meant to represent local orchards. The frieze along the roof parapets are designed to represent the local mountains and flora and fauna that grow nearby. With its steel steeple, the Orem Temple is one of the taller temples in the church, measuring 218 feet (66 m). It is the first temple in Utah County not to include a statue of the angel Moroni.

=== Interior ===
The temple interior has one baptismal font (used for baptisms for the dead), along with four rooms each used for the endowment and sealing ordinances. The stone flooring features diamond and circle patterns with a cherry leaf border, and as the space transitions to the ordinance rooms, carpeting is introduced that replicates these designs while incorporating more abstract floral patterns.

The temple features marble wainscoting, wooden columns, and coffered ceilings that progressively grow more intricate, culminating in the celestial room. Woodwork throughout the building is painted. Designs for aforementioned elements are designed to be subtle to bring attention to ordinances rather than the building itself. Interior walls have cream, tan, and green tones, with a cherry finish on the furniture. Artwork designs have elements that are based on a modified Art Deco design, with curved lines and cattails, with gold leaf line work highlighting specific elements. Light fixtures are cylindrical and transitional, made from brass, crystal and glass, and carry the same cherry tree motif. Paintings mentioned in the temple include local meadows and Bridal Veil Falls. A mural titled “Come Unto Jesus” by Michael Malm hangs in the Orem Temple, which is a copy of a larger version that covers a wall in the church's Conference Center. The temple contains some original artworks, including one named "Christ Ordaining the Twelve". Other original paintings showcase local Utah Lake, with ducks, geese, and pelicans bobbing on the water and flying in the sky.

== Access ==
A public open house was held from October 27 to December 16, 2023. The temple was dedicated in two sessions on January 21, 2024 by D. Todd Christofferson. Temple access is only available to church members with a current temple recommend.

== Gallery ==
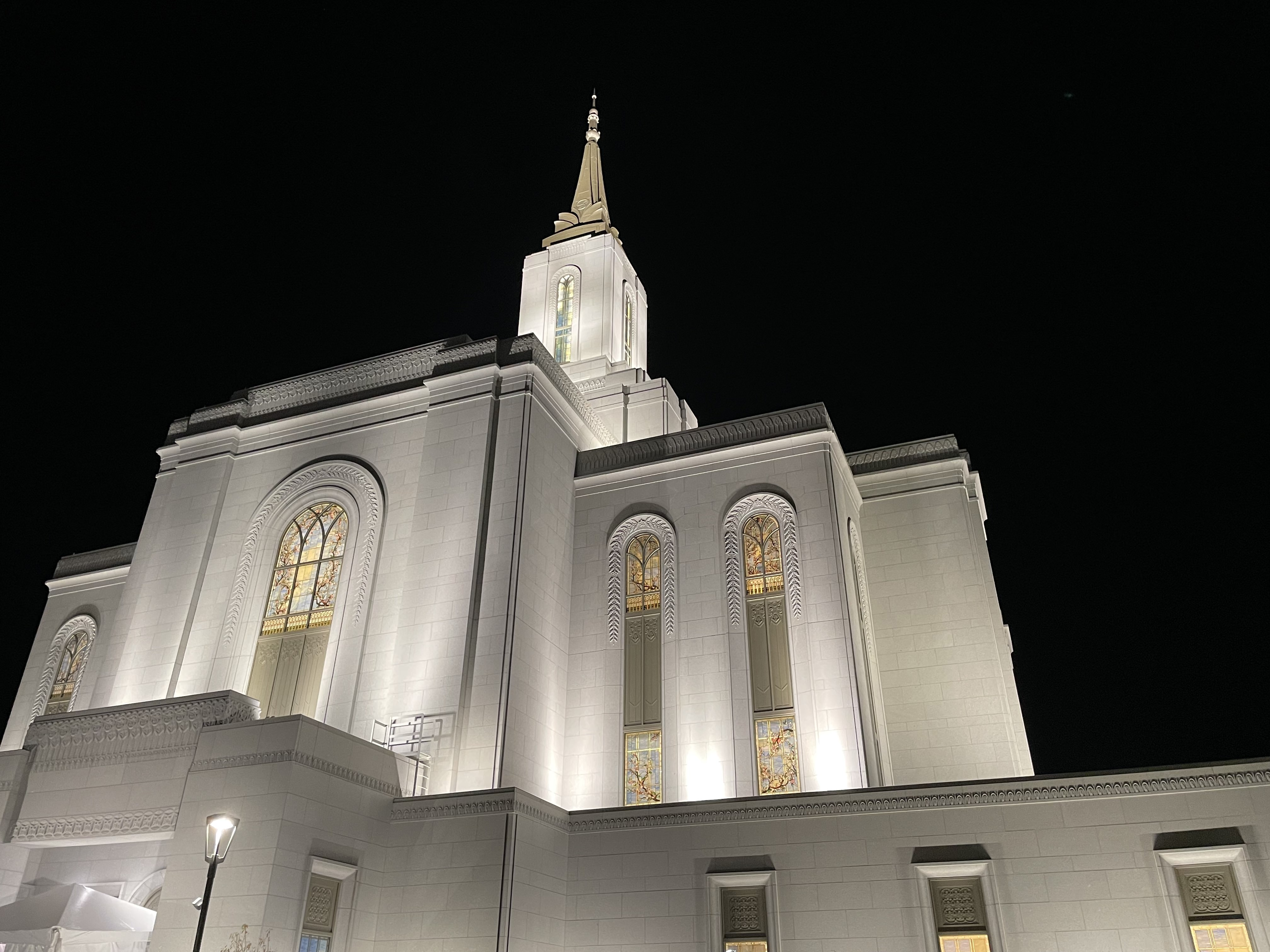
The temple at night

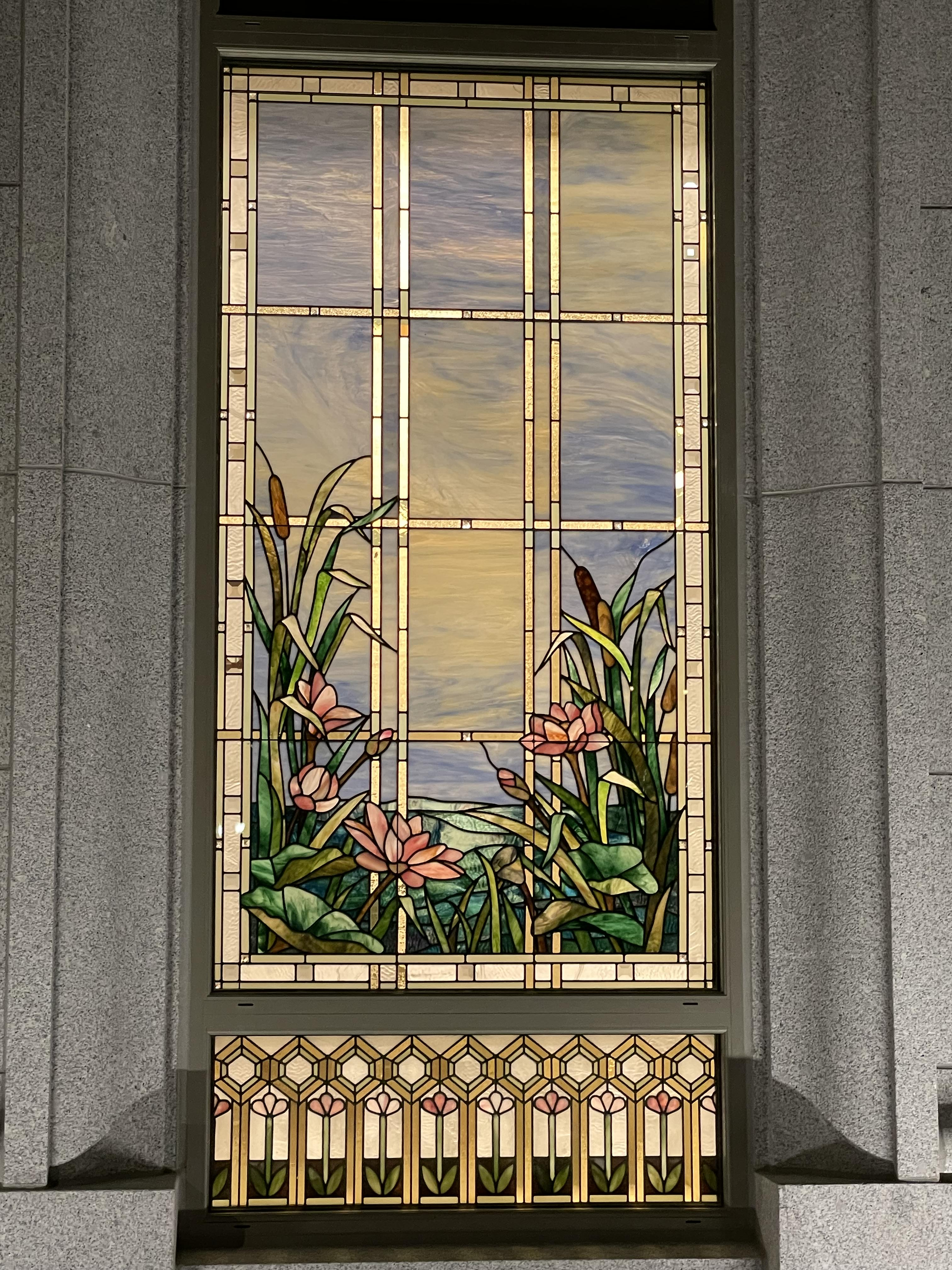
First floor stained glass with bullrushes

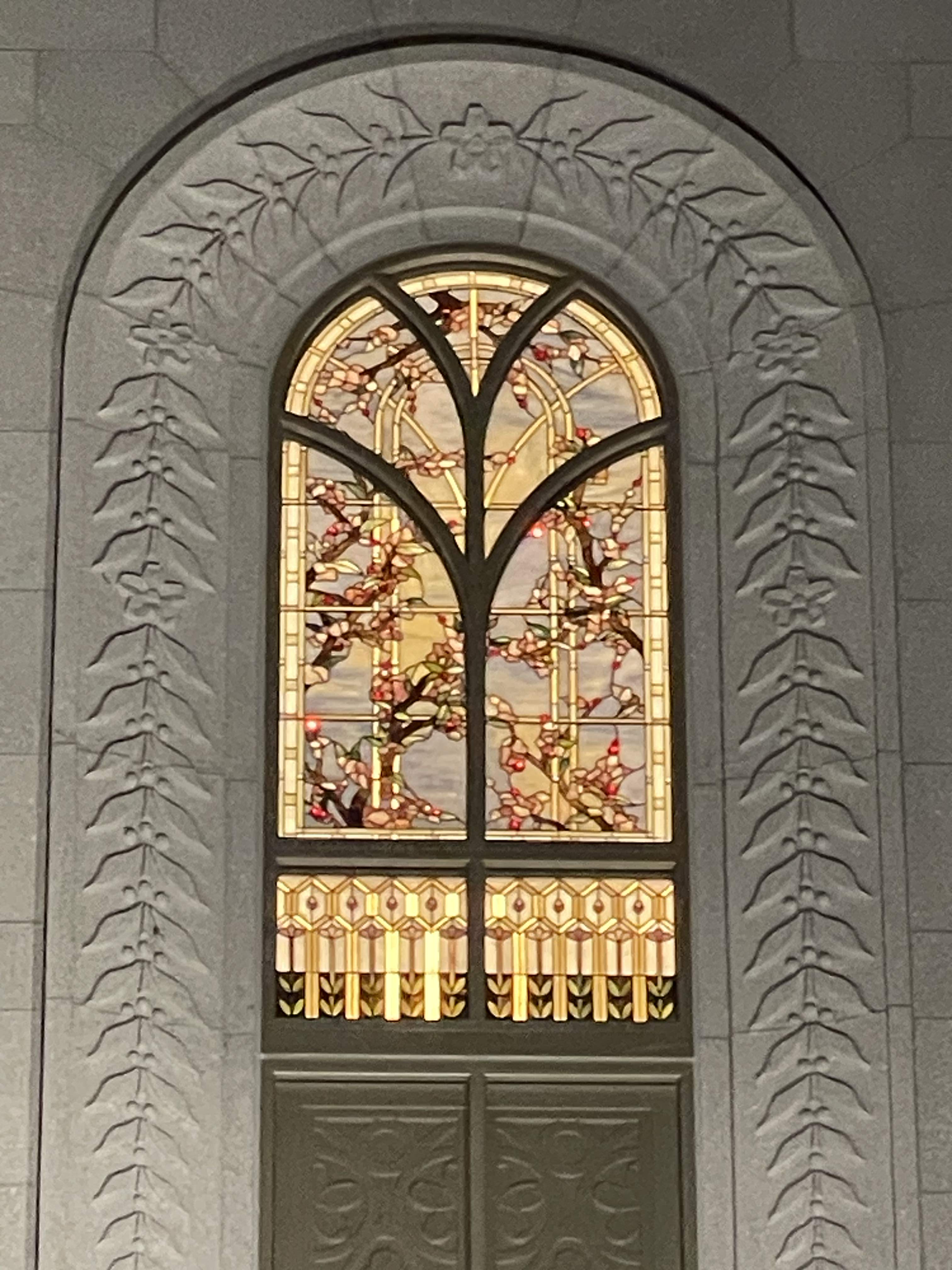
Third floor stained glass depicting a cherry tree

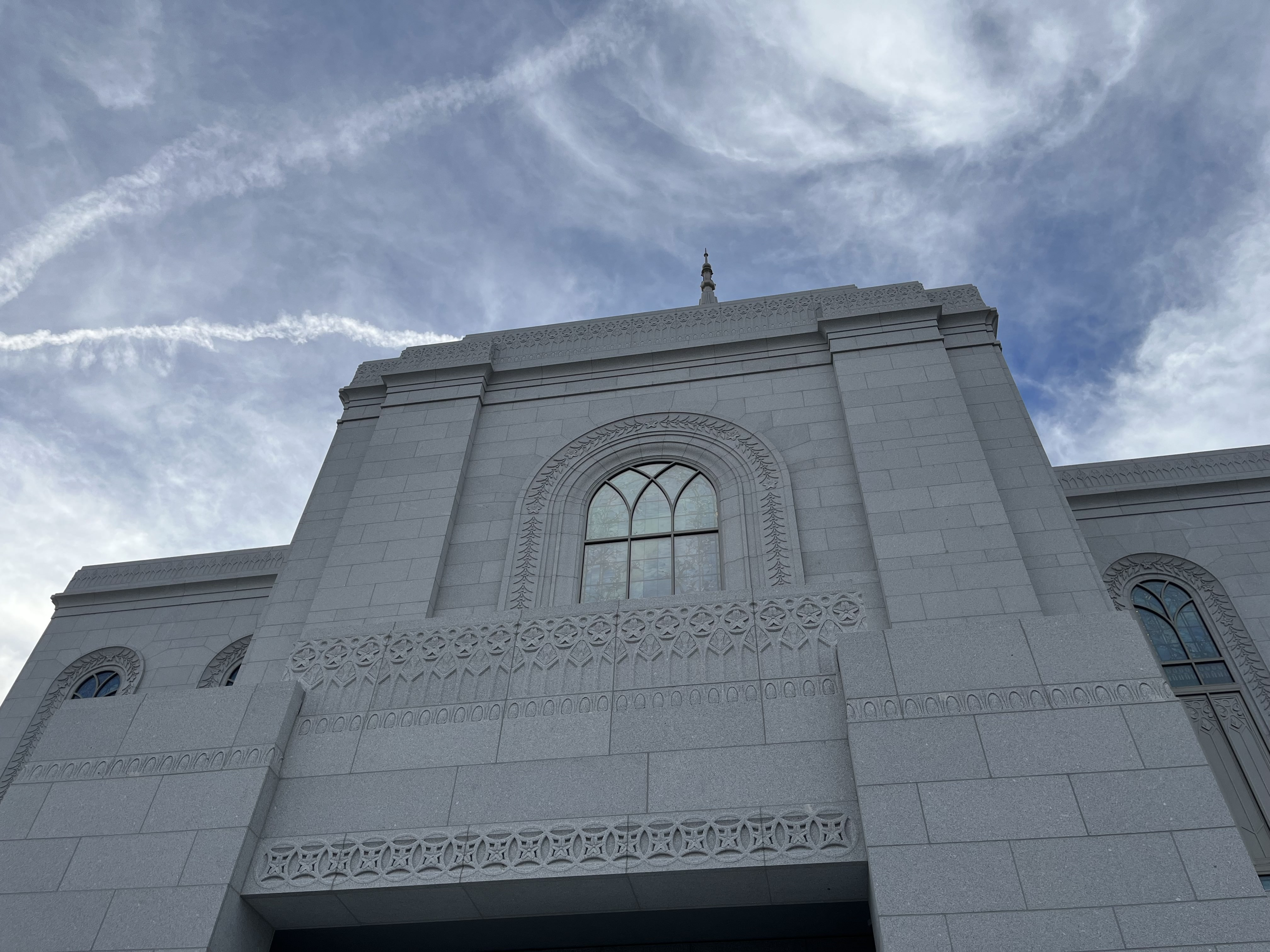
Detailed stonework of the temple

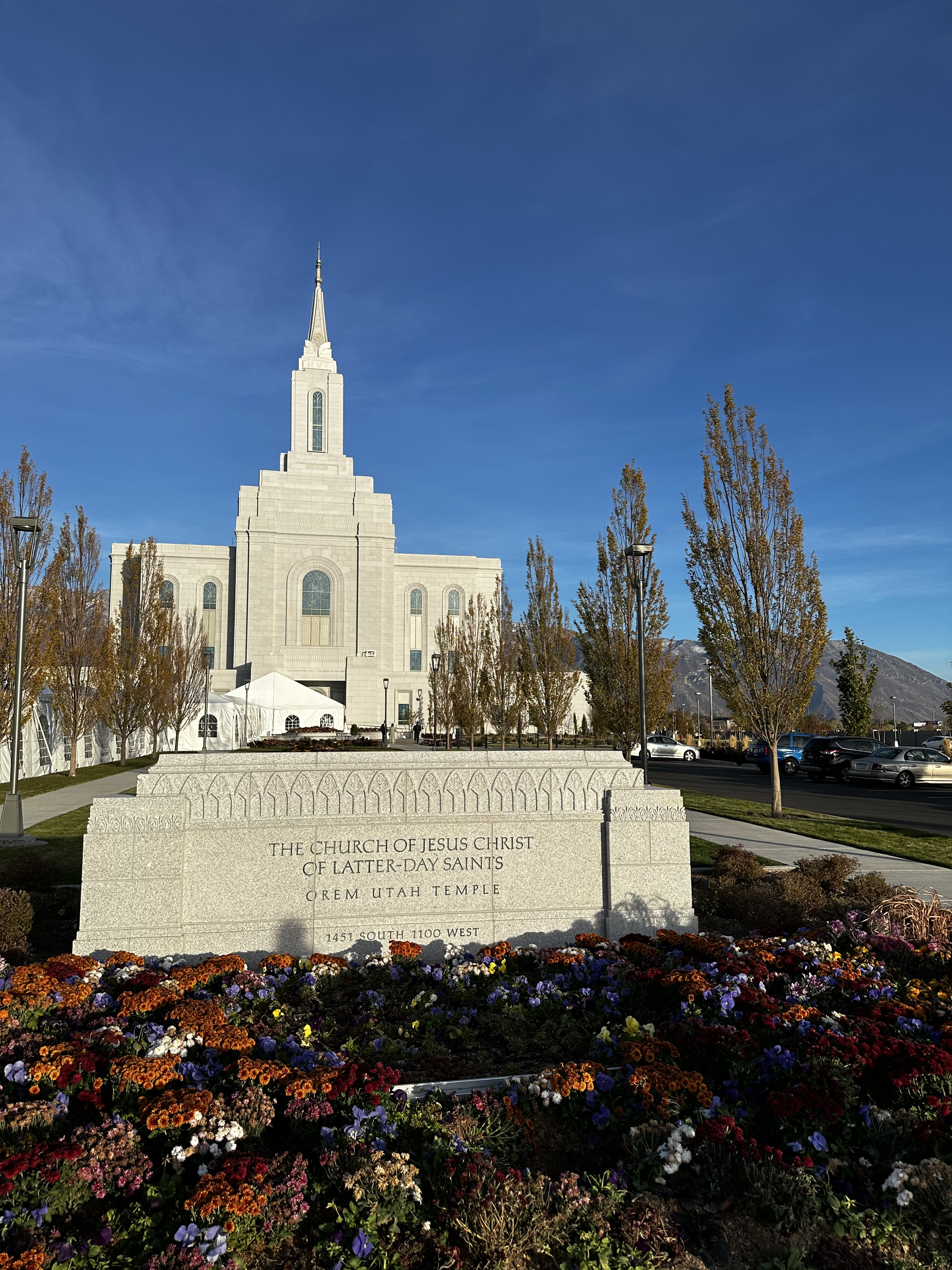
The sign in front of the Orem Utah Temple

== See also ==
Temples in Utah
Wasatch Front Temples
Temples along the Wasatch Front
- = Operating
- = Under construction
- = Announced
- = Temporarily Closed

- The Church of Jesus Christ of Latter-day Saints in Utah
- Comparison of temples of The Church of Jesus Christ of Latter-day Saints
- List of temples of The Church of Jesus Christ of Latter-day Saints
- List of temples of The Church of Jesus Christ of Latter-day Saints by geographic region
- Temple architecture (Latter-day Saints)
