= Lima Peru Temple =

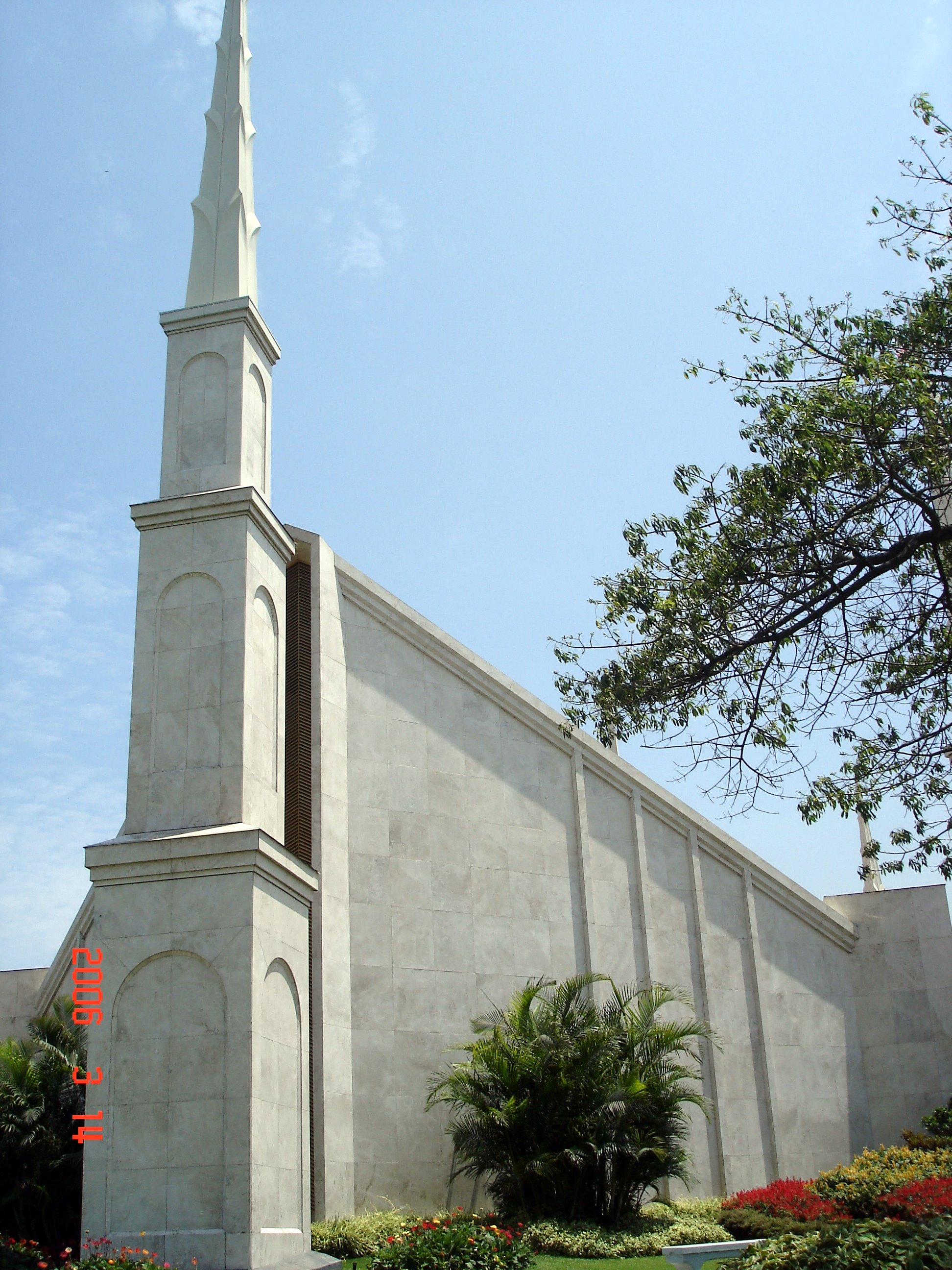
- Interactive map of Lima Peru Temple
- Number: 38
- Dedication: 10 January 1986, by Gordon B. Hinckley
- Site: 4.5 acres (1.8 ha)
- Floor area: 9,600 ft^{2} (890 m^{2})
- Height: 112 ft (34 m)
- Official website • News & images

Church chronology
← Seoul Korea Temple	Lima Peru Temple	→ Buenos Aires Argentina Temple

Additional information
- Announced: 1 April 1981, by Spencer W. Kimball
- Groundbreaking: 11 September 1982, by Boyd K. Packer
- Open house: 11–28 December 1985
- Current president: Gino Galli
- Designed by: Jesse M. Harris
- Location: La Molina, Lima, Peru
- Coordinates: 12°4′10.96680″S 76°56′56.02920″W
- Exterior finish: Local granite, Oriental design
- Design: Modern adaptation of six-spire design
- Baptistries: 1
- Ordinance rooms: 4 (stationary)
- Sealing rooms: 3
- Clothing rental: Yes

The Lima Peru Temple is the 38th operating temple of the Church of Jesus Christ of Latter-day Saints, located in La Molina, Lima Province, Peru. The intent to build the temple was announced on April 1, 1981, by church president Spencer W. Kimball during a press conference on Temple Square. It was one of nine temples announced that day, the largest number announced by the church at one time to that point. It is the first in Peru and the third in South America, following the São Paulo Brazil and Santiago Chile temples.

The temple has a floor area of approximately 9,600 square feet, has a white granite exterior, with six spires surrounding the six-sided structure. A statue of the angel Moroni, rising to 112 feet, is on top of the tallest spire. A groundbreaking ceremony, to signify the beginning of construction, was held on September 11, 1982, conducted by Boyd K. Packer of the Quorum of the Twelve Apostles. The temple was dedicated over 11 sessions held from January 10 to January 12, 1986, by Gordon B. Hinckley, first counselor in the First Presidency.

== History ==
The temple was announced by church president Spencer W. Kimball on April 1, 1981, during a press conference on Temple Square in Salt Lake City, Utah. The announcement of nine temples that day was the highest number proposed at one time to that date, as well as being the most international locations. At the time, the announcement brought the number of temples scheduled or in operation to 37. A 1981 Church News article noted that "The first nine temples of the Church took 97 years to construct, the second nine 47 years. The third nine were announced within seven years, and the last nine in one news conference."

On September 11, 1982, the church held a groundbreaking ceremony, presided over by Boyd K. Packer of the Quorum of the Twelve Apostles. Approximately 3,500 people attended the ceremony, including a choir of 200 people. The temple was constructed on an undeveloped site of 4.5 acres (1.8 hectares) in the La Molina district of eastern Lima.

When Peruvian church members heard that a temple would be built in their country, many sacrificed to contribute to its construction. Some gave personal possessions, while others sold their furniture or appliances. Some gave their gold wedding bands, and others even had gold fillings pried from their teeth and replaced with a less-costly substance.

After construction was complete, the church held a public open house from December 12 to December 28, 1985. Approximately 24,500 visitors attended the temple during this period, with a majority of them being not being church members.

The Lima Peru Temple was dedicated by Gordon B. Hinckley, first counselor in the First Presidency, in 11 sessions from January 10 to 12, 1986. Hinckley stated that he was so pleased to see the temple that "I couldn't hold back the tears, and I haven't been able to hold them back since. There stands now a house of the Lord in the nation of Peru. God be thanked for this glorious and happy day." He was joined at the ceremony by James E. Faust, of the Quorum of the Twelve Apostles, and Robert L. Simpson, a general authority and managing director of the church's Temple Department. F. Burton Howard, Loren C. Dunn, and Helio R. Camargo, presidency of the church's South America North Area, were also in attendance.] About 10,775 church members from all over the country participated in a dedicatory session, with some traveling up to 26 hours by bus to attend.

The temple was dedicated seven days before the Buenos Aires Argentina Temple. The dedications of these temples in January 1986 doubled the number of temples in South America. When it was dedicated, the temple district consisted of 119,000 members in Peru and 45,000 in Bolivia.

On February 24, 1988, the temple conducted its first session in Quechua, a native language. From 1988 to 1990, attendance at the Lima Peru Temple tripled, marked by an increase in weekday sessions from three a day to eleven a day.

On April 3, 2016, church president Thomas S. Monson announced the intent to construct a second temple in Lima, to be called the Lima Peru Los Olivos Temple. After its completion in January 2024, Lima became the first city outside of Utah to have two operating temples.

== Design and architecture ==
The temple is on a 4.5-acre (1.8-hectare) site in the La Molina district of Lima. Adjacent to the temple is a building with patron housing, a cafeteria, a family history center, and a distribution center. The Peru Missionary Training Center is located in La Molina, a short drive from the temple.

The structure has spires at each part of the six-sided temple, three at the front and three toward the back, and is constructed with local white granite and an oriental design. The exterior is white granite, with a red peaked roof on top. A statue of the angel Moroni is on top the of tallest spire, at the front of the building. Back-to-back arches surround the temple, featured in the windows, doors, and impressions in the walls.

The temple has four instruction rooms, three sealing rooms, and a baptistry.The temple has a total floor area of approximately 9,600 square feet (892 square meters).

== Renovations ==
During a renovation in 2013, a new north-facing angel Moroni statue was installed atop the main spire, which also faces north. Although the previous angel statue had faced east, the new angel was allowed to remain as fitted by the contractor after being reviewed by a visiting church apostle.

== Temple leadership and admittance ==
The church's temples are directed by a temple president and matron, each typically serving for a term of three years. The president and matron oversee the administration of temple operations and provide guidance and training for both temple patrons and staff. Serving from 1986 to 1987, Samuel Boren was the first president, with Clara A. Boren serving as matron. As of 2025, Lorenzo Gino Galli Coxola is the president, with Mirna Marleni Cepeda Castillo de Galli serving as matron.

After construction was complete, the Church held a public open house from December 12 to December 28, 1985. Like all the church's temples, it is not used for Sunday worship services. To members of the church, temples are regarded as sacred houses of the Lord. Once dedicated, only church members with a current temple recommend can enter for worship..

== See also ==
Peru Temples

Temples in and near Peru
= Operating
= Under construction
= Announced
= Temporarily Closed

- Addison Pratt, a major figure in this mission, 1840s
- Dean L. Larsen, a former temple president
- Comparison of temples of the Church of Jesus Christ of Latter-day Saints
- List of temples of the Church of Jesus Christ of Latter-day Saints
- List of temples of the Church of Jesus Christ of Latter-day Saints by geographic region
- Temple architecture (LDS Church)
- The Church of Jesus Christ of Latter-day Saints in Peru
- Pachacamac, ancient temple site southeast of Lima
