= Quito Ecuador Temple =

Temple of the Church of Jesus Christ of Latter-day Saints

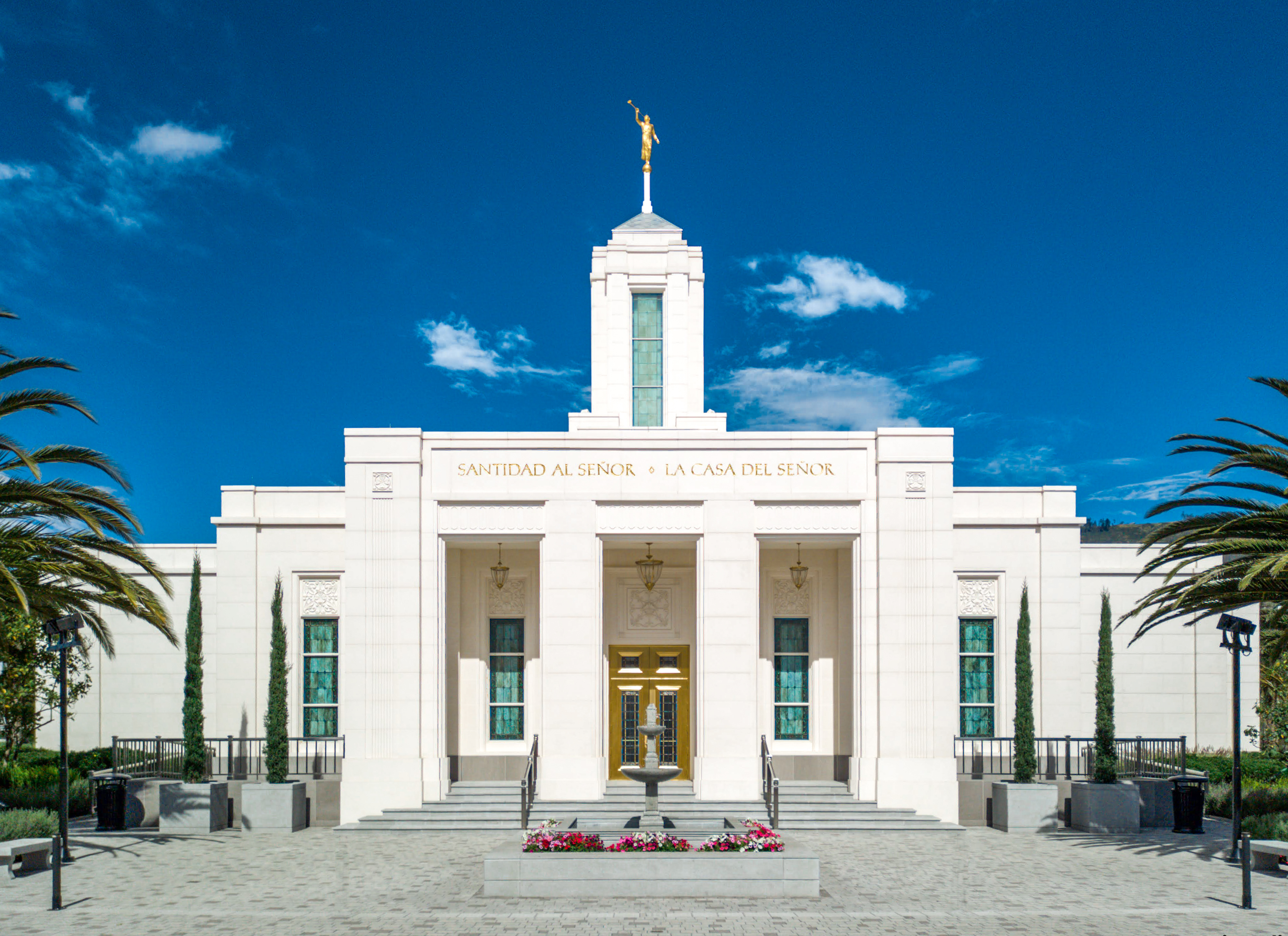
- The Quito Ecuador Temple
- Interactive map of Quito Ecuador Temple
- Number: 175
- Dedication: 20 November 2022, by Quentin L. Cook
- Site: 3.96 acres (1.60 ha)
- Floor area: 36,780 ft^{2} (3,417 m^{2})
- Height: 97 ft (30 m)
- Official website • News & images

Church chronology
← Belém Brazil Temple	Quito Ecuador Temple	→ San Juan Puerto Rico Temple

Additional information
- Announced: 3 April 2016, by Thomas S. Monson
- Groundbreaking: 11 May 2019, by Enrique R. Falabella
- Open house: 14-29 October 2022
- Current president: Luis Ayala
- Location: Quito, Ecuador
- Coordinates: 0°12′51″S 78°26′28″W
- Exterior finish: White Turkish limestone
- Baptistries: 1
- Ordinance rooms: 2
- Sealing rooms: 2

The Quito Ecuador Temple is the 175th operating temple of the Church of Jesus Christ of Latter-day Saints, located in Cumbayá, Ecuador, just east of Quito. It is the church's second temple in the country, after the Guayaquil Ecuador Temple. It was both announced and dedicated on the same day as the Belém Brazil Temple, with the latter being dedicated several hours before. Prior to the announcement of this temple, Ecuador was the country with the highest number of church members with only one temple.

A groundbreaking ceremony, to signify the beginning of construction, was held on May 11, 2019, conducted by Enrique R. Falabella, a church general authority.

== History ==
The intent to construct the temple was announced by church president Thomas S. Monson on 3 April 2016, during general conference. A groundbreaking, to signify beginning of construction, was held on May 11, 2019, with Enrique R. Falabella, president of the church's South America Northwest Area, presiding. The Interior Minister of Ecuador, María Paula Romo, attended the ceremony, along with several Ecuadorian religious leaders and more than 800 people.

The temple was planned to be completed in 2021, but was delayed due to the COVID-19 pandemic and it was dedicated in 2022. A public open house was held from 14 to 29 October 2022 and was attended by more than 50,000 people. The temple was dedicated by Quentin L. Cook on 20 November 2022.

== Design and architecture ==
The temple's architecture reflects both the cultural heritage of Quito and its spiritual significance to the church.

The temple sits on a 3.96-acre plot, and the landscaping around the temple features royal palm trees and gray brick sidewalks, as well as a fountain made of the same natural andesite stone that forms the base of the temple. Patron housing is also located on the site.

The temple has a single attached central spire with a statue of the angel Moroni. It is 97 feet tall, constructed with cast-in-situ concrete walls and floors and clad in white Turkish limestone. The exterior has a solid, simple design, with decoratively carved stone panels and art glass windows. The art glass windows feature abstract floral designs in blue, dark green, light green, red, yellow, and white.

The interior has a floral motif centered around geraniums. This motif is found in the temple’s art glass windows as well as its embroidered carpets. The temple includes two instruction rooms, two sealing rooms, and a baptistry, each arranged for ceremonial use.

The design has elements representing the heritage and natural landscapes of Quito, providing spiritual meaning to the temple's appearance and function. Symbolism is important to church members and includes the geranium motif throughout the temple; geraniums are “a very representative flower of the city of Quito.”

== Temple presidents ==
The church's temples are directed by a temple president and matron, each serving for a term of three years. The president and matron oversee the administration of temple operations and provide guidance and training for both temple patrons and staff. As of 2024, Bolivar F. Aguirre and Ana L. de Aguirre are the president and matron.

== Admittance ==
On June 24, 2022, the church announced the public open house that was held from October 14-29, 2022 (excluding Sundays). The temple was dedicated by Quentin L. Cook on November 20, 2022, in three sessions.

Like all the church's temples, it is not used for Sunday worship services. To members of the church, temples are regarded as sacred houses of the Lord. Once dedicated, only church members with a current temple recommend can enter for worship.

== See also ==
Temples in Ecuador
- = Operating
- = Under construction
- = Announced
- = Temporarily Closed
- Comparison of temples of The Church of Jesus Christ of Latter-day Saints
- List of temples of The Church of Jesus Christ of Latter-day Saints
- List of temples of The Church of Jesus Christ of Latter-day Saints by geographic region
- Temple architecture (Latter-day Saints)
- Religion in Ecuador
