= The Church of Jesus Christ of Latter-day Saints in Ecuador =

- (Logo in Spanish)

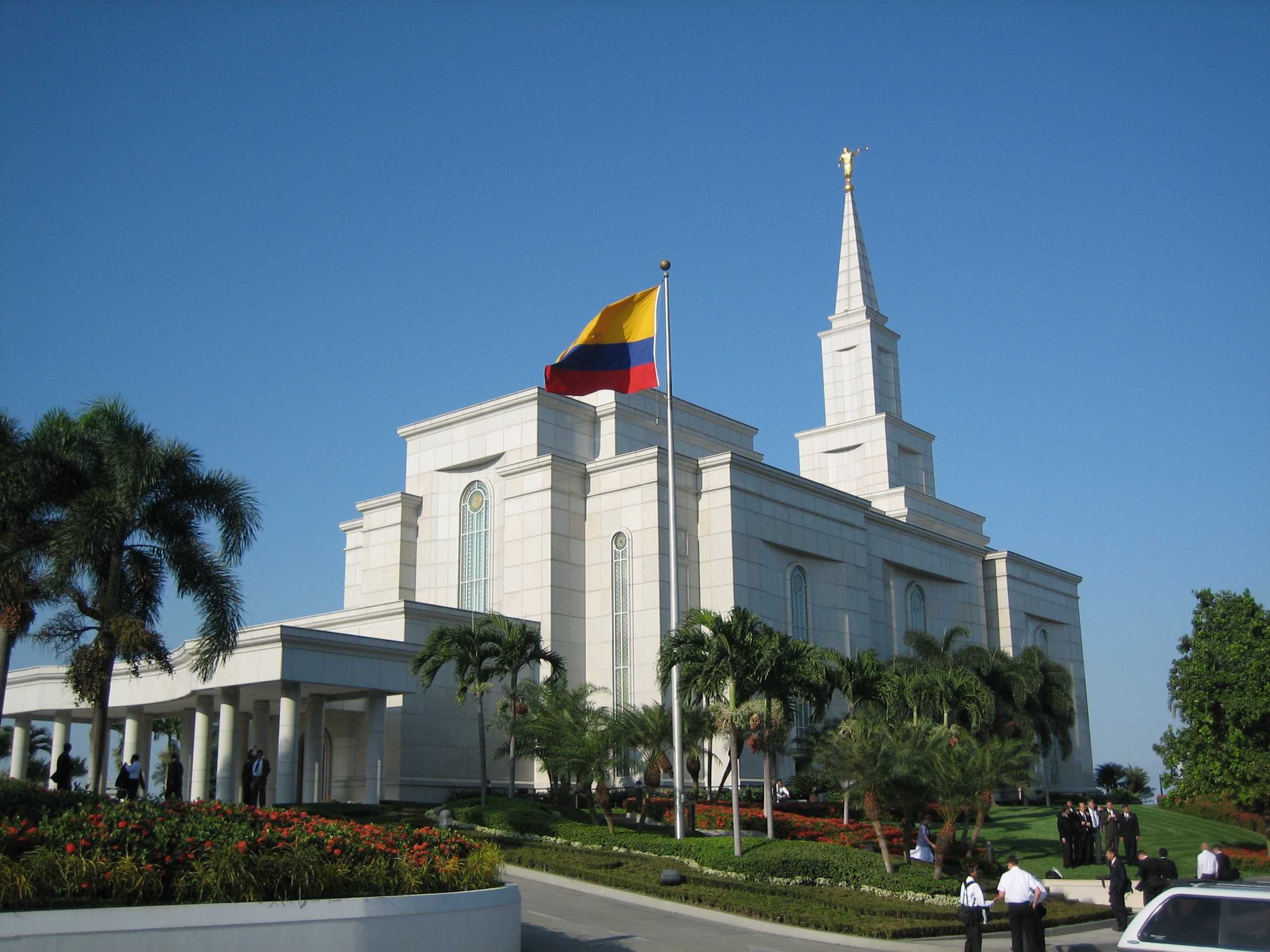
- An LDS temple in Guayaquil, Ecuador
- Area: South America Northwest
- Members: 279,046 (2025)
- Stakes: 45
- Districts: 5
- Wards: 276
- Branches: 62
- Total congregations: 338
- Missions: 7
- Temples: 2 operating
- FamilySearch Centers: 73

The Church of Jesus Christ of Latter-day Saints in Ecuador refers to the Church of Jesus Christ of Latter-day Saints (LDS Church) and its members in Ecuador. The first missionaries arrived on October 31, 1965. Since then, the LDS Church in Ecuador has grown to more than 275,000 members in more than 300 congregations. Ecuador ranks as having the 5th most members of the LDS Church in South America and 9th worldwide

== History ==
Membership in Ecuador
Year	Membership
1970*	1,000
1979	23,332
1989*	70,000
1999	146,420
2009	185,663
2019	253,781
2025	279,046
*Membership was published as an estimate. Source: Wendall J. Ashton; Jim M. Wall, Deseret News, various years, Church Almanac Country Information: Ecuador

The first Mormon missionaries from the Andes Mission arrived in Quito, Ecuador in October 1965. Their efforts included teaching indigenous Otavalans, and in 1980 the Book of Mormon was published in Kichwa.

Elder Spencer W. Kimball of the Quorum of the Twelve Apostles believed that teaching descendants of ancient Andean Indians will serve the purpose of fulfilling God's promise to bring the Book of Mormon to the Lamanites. Over the next few years, Kimball visited Ecuador a few times to preach the gospel. The church established a strong presence in Quito, Guayaquil, and among indigenous Otavalans.

In January 1966, Missionaries held the very first sacrament meeting in Guayaquil and they arrived Otavalo in March 1966. Within weeks of their arrival, printed notices were surrounded among nearby Ibarra warning the local residents to avoid Latter-day Saints and a few other proselytizing sects.

The inaugural branch meeting was held in March, attended by the missionaries and Manuel Macías Caseras in Otavalo. Within the year, the branch grew to more than 18 members.

On August 1, 1999, the Guayaquil Ecuador Temple was dedicated by church president Gordon B. Hinckley. On April 3, 2016, a second temple was announced to be built in Quito. On May 14, 2026 a third temple was announced to be built in Otavalo, Ecuador.

== Stakes and districts ==
As of July 2026, Ecuador had the following stakes and districts:

Stake/District	Organized	Mission	Temple District
Ambato Ecuador Stake	10 Dec 1995	Ecuador Quito South	Quito Ecuador
Babahoyo Ecuador Stake	15 May 2005	Ecuador Guayaquil East	Guayaquil Ecuador
Cuenca Ecuador Stake	23 Nov 1997	Ecuador Guayaquil South	Guayaquil Ecuador
Durán Ecuador North Stake	16 Mar 1980	Ecuador Guayaquil East	Guayaquil Ecuador
Durán Ecuador South Stake	31 May 1992	Ecuador Guayaquil East	Guayaquil Ecuador
El Triunfo Ecuador District	17 Nov 2002	Ecuador Guayaquil South	Guayaquil Ecuador
Esmeraldas Ecuador Stake	22 Oct 1995	Ecuador Quito West	Quito Ecuador
Guayaquil Ecuador Alborada Stake	26 Feb 2023	Ecuador Guayaquil East	Guayaquil Ecuador
Guayaquil Ecuador Centenario Stake	18 Aug 1991	Ecuador Guayaquil South	Guayaquil Ecuador
Guayaquil Ecuador El Cisne Stake	11 Feb 1996	Ecuador Guayaquil West	Guayaquil Ecuador
Guayaquil Ecuador El Salado Stake	4 Jun 1978	Ecuador Guayaquil West	Guayaquil Ecuador
Guayaquil Ecuador Fortin Stake	3 Sep 2017	Ecuador Guayaquil North	Guayaquil Ecuador
Guayaquil Ecuador Garcia Moreno Stake	30 Apr 1989	Ecuador Guayaquil West	Guayaquil Ecuador
Guayaquil Ecuador Huancavilca Stake	6 Dec 1992	Ecuador Guayaquil South	Guayaquil Ecuador
Guayaquil Ecuador Juan Montalvo Stake	18 May 2014	Ecuador Guayaquil West	Guayaquil Ecuador
Guayaquil Ecuador Kennedy Stake	11 Feb 1996	Ecuador Guayaquil East	Guayaquil Ecuador
Guayaquil Ecuador La Pradera Stake	2 Sep 2007	Ecuador Guayaquil South	Guayaquil Ecuador
Guayaquil Ecuador Las Orquideas Stake	18 Aug 1991	Ecuador Guayaquil East	Guayaquil Ecuador
Guayaquil Ecuador Prosperina Stake	16 Mar 1980	Ecuador Guayaquil West	Guayaquil Ecuador
Guayaquil Ecuador Puerto Liza Stake	7 Sep 1997	Ecuador Guayaquil West	Guayaquil Ecuador
Guayaquil Ecuador Puerto Nuevo Stake	4 Mar 1979	Ecuador Guayaquil West	Guayaquil Ecuador
Guayaquil Ecuador Via Daule Stake	8 Jun 1997	Ecuador Guayaquil North	Guayaquil Ecuador
Ibarra Ecuador Stake	22 Feb 2026	Ecuador Quito North	Quito Ecuador
Ipiales Colombia District	8 Jun 1975	Ecuador Quito North	Quito Ecuador
Libertad Ecuador Stake	13 Jun 2004	Ecuador Guayaquil West	Guayaquil Ecuador
Loja Ecuador District	7 May 1991	Ecuador Guayaquil South	Guayaquil Ecuador
Los Chillos Ecuador Stake	31 May 2009	Ecuador Quito South	Quito Ecuador
Los Chillos Ecuador San Rafael Stake	3 Sep 2017	Ecuador Quito South	Quito Ecuador
Machala Ecuador Puerto Bolívar Stake	23 Sep 2018	Ecuador Guayaquil South	Guayaquil Ecuador
Machala Ecuador Stake	2 Dec 2018	Ecuador Guayaquil South	Guayaquil Ecuador
Manta Ecuador Stake	25 Feb 1996	Ecuador Guayaquil North	Guayaquil Ecuador
Milagro Ecuador Stake	5 May 1991	Ecuador Guayaquil East	Guayaquil Ecuador
Otavalo Ecuador San Pablo Stake	6 Dec 1981	Ecuador Quito North	Quito Ecuador
Otavalo Ecuador Imbabura Stake	19 Jan 1997	Ecuador Quito North	Quito Ecuador
Otavalo Ecuador Imbaya Stake	9 Oct 2016	Ecuador Quito North	Quito Ecuador
Orellana Ecuador District	14 Jun 2026	Ecuador Quito North	Quito Ecuador
Portoviejo Ecuador Stake	13 Jan 1981	Ecuador Guayaquil North	Guayaquil Ecuador
Puyo Ecuador District	17 Mar 2024	Ecuador Quito South	Quito Ecuador
Quevedo Ecuador North Stake	26 Apr 1981	Ecuador Guayaquil North	Guayaquil Ecuador
Quevedo Ecuador South Stake	7 Sep 1997	Ecuador Guayaquil North	Guayaquil Ecuador
Quito Ecuador Stake	22 Aug 1979	Ecuador Quito West	Quito Ecuador
Quito Ecuador Calderón Stake	19 Apr 1998	Ecuador Quito North	Quito Ecuador
Quito Ecuador Chillogallo Stake	21 May 1995	Ecuador Quito West	Quito Ecuador
Quito Ecuador Colón Stake	10 Jan 1981	Ecuador Quito South	Quito Ecuador
Quito Ecuador La Ofelia Stake	25 Jan 1998	Ecuador Quito West	Quito Ecuador
Quito Ecuador Turubamba Stake	20 Oct 2013	Ecuador Quito South	Quito Ecuador
Riobamba Ecuador Stake	21 May 2023	Ecuador Quito South	Quito Ecuador
Samborondón Ecuador Stake	19 Aug 2018	Ecuador Guayaquil East	Guayaquil Ecuador
Santa Rosa Ecuador Stake	23 Sep 2018	Ecuador Guayaquil South	Guayaquil Ecuador
Santo Domingo Ecuador Stake	3 Sep 1995	Ecuador Quito West	Quito Ecuador
Ventanas Ecuador District	9 Nov 1994	Ecuador Guayaquil East	Guayaquil Ecuador
Vinces Ecuador District	21 Oct 1992	Ecuador Guayaquil North	Guayaquil Ecuador

- The Ipiales Colombia District has congregations in Ecuador.

== Missions ==
Mission	Organized
Ecuador Guayaquil East	29 Jun 2020
Ecuador Guayaquil North	1 Jul 1991
Ecuador Guayaquil South	1 Jul 1978
Ecuador Guayaquil West	1 Jul 2013
Ecuador Quito South*	1 Aug 1970
Ecuador Quito North	1 Jul 2013
Ecuador Quito West	June 2024

- The Ecuador Mission was renamed the Ecuador Quito Mission on 20 June 1974. It was later renamed Ecuador Quito South Mission in June 2024.

== Temples ==
Temples in Ecuador
- = Operating
- = Under construction
- = Announced
- = Temporarily Closed

58. Guayaquil Ecuador Temple; Official website; News & images	
Location: Announced: Groundbreaking: Dedicated: Size: Style:	Guayaquil, Ecuador; 31 March 1982 by Spencer W. Kimball; 10 August 1996 by Richard G. Scott; 1 August 1999 by Gordon B. Hinckley; 45,000 sq ft (4,200 m^{2}) on a 6.2-acre (2.5 ha) site Classic modern, single-spire design - designed by Rafael Velez Calisto, Architects & Consultants and Church A&E Services
175. Quito Ecuador Temple; Official website; News & images	
Location: Announced: Groundbreaking: Dedicated: Size:	Quito, Ecuador; 3 April 2016 by Thomas S. Monson; 11 May 2019 by Enrique R. Falabella; 20 November 2022 by Quentin L. Cook; 36,780 sq ft (3,417 m^{2}) on a 3.96-acre (1.60 ha) site
385. Otavalo Ecuador Temple (Site announced); Official website; News & images	
Location: Announced: Size:	Otavalo, Ecuador; 14 May 2026 by Dallin H. Oaks; 18,850 sq ft (1,751 m^{2}) on a 6.05-acre (2.45 ha) site

== See also ==
- Religion in Ecuador
