= The Church of Jesus Christ of Latter-day Saints in the Mariana Islands =

The Church of Jesus Christ of Latter-day Saints in Guam
- LDS Church meetinghouses and temple Red = Yigo Guam Temple and adjacent meetinghouse Green = Stake Center; Purple = Other meetinghouse
- Area: Asia North
- Members: 2,768 (2025)
- Stakes: 1
- Wards: 4
- Missions: 1
- Temples: 1 operating
- FamilySearch Centers: 3

The Church of Jesus Christ of Latter-day Saints in the Northern Mariana Islands
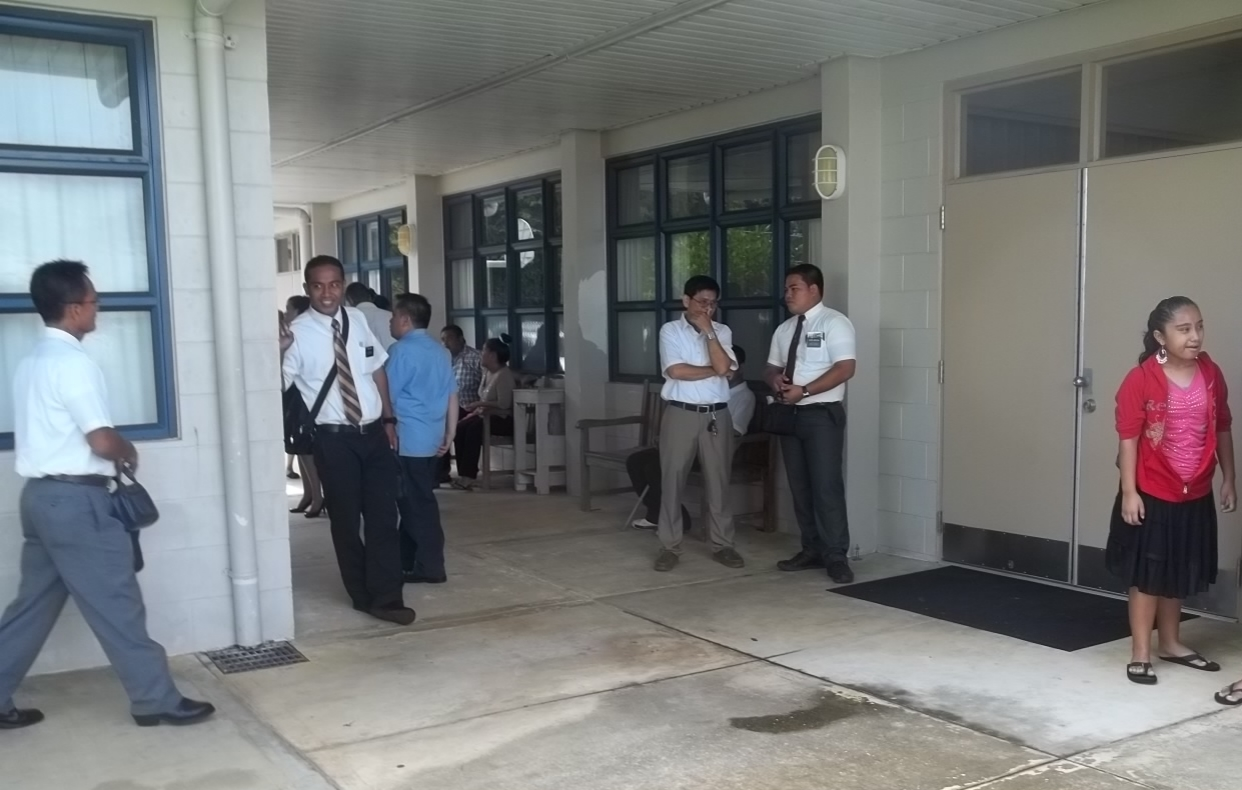
- Members and missionaries mingle at the Saipan meetinghouse after Sunday services.
- Area: Asia North
- Members: 938 (2025)
- Wards: 1
- FamilySearch Centers: 1

The Church of Jesus Christ of Latter-day Saints (LDS Church) in the Mariana Islands refers to the organization and its members in the Mariana Islands. The Mariana Islands consist of two jurisdictions of the United States: the Commonwealth of the Northern Mariana Islands and, at the southern end of the chain, the territory of Guam.

== History ==
Membership In Guam
Year	Membership
1940*	100
1950	271
1960*	300
1970	469
1983	764
1991*	1,000
1999	1,476
2009	1,874
2019	2,550
2025	2,768
*Membership was published as an estimated or rounded number. Source: Windall J. Ashton; Jim M. Wall, Deseret News, various years, Church Almanac Country Information: Guam

=== Guam ===
The first known church members on Guam were during World War II. From 1944 to 1945, servicemen's groups numbering 50-300 existed on Guam. In 1946, families were allowed to accompany servicemen and all servicemen's groups on the island were consolidated to one. The Guam Branch became part of the Honolulu Stake in 1959. On March 3, 1970, the Guam Branch became a ward in the Honolulu Stake.

Full-time missionary work began in July 1970 when Michael Corrigan and Vern Liljenquist arrived from the Hawaii Mission. On November 21, 1971, the Honolulu Stake was divided due to size and the ward became part of the newly-created Kaneohe Stake. The first Chamorro couple to join the church was baptized on May 21, 1977. In 1989, portions of the Book of Mormon were translated into Chamorro. Also in 1989, Herbert J. Leddy became the first to be called as the district president. On January 31, 2000, church president Gordon B. Hinckley visited Guam. He was welcomed by then-Governor Carl Gutierrez and 684 church members. On December 12, 2010, the Barrigada Guam Stake was formed. As of May 2025, this stake has four wards in Guam, one ward in the Northern Mariana Islands, a branch in Yap, and one branch in Palau.

In 2020, during the COVID-19 outbreak, the church made multiple donations to Guam. Beginning in May, missionaries from the Micronesia Guam Mission (MGM) and Latter-day Saint Charities donated a large amount of food to the Catholic Agana Archdiocese Ministry to the Homeless. On July 24, Eric Hicks, president of the MGM, and seven missionaries helped the Ministry reorganize the cafeteria back from a supply room to a serving area. Also in May, the church made food donations for the Salvation Army Guam Corps. Starting in May, those serving in the MGM began volunteering weekly at the Salvation Army to organize the donations. Latter-day Saint Charities has made two donations to a local organization called Kadu Care-Givers.

=== Saipan ===
Membership in the Northern Mariana Islands
Year	Membership
1980	85
1989*	200
2009	870
2009	757
2019	865
2025	938
*Membership was published as an estimated or rounded number. Source: Windall J. Ashton; Jim M. Wall, Deseret News, various years, Church Almanac Country Information: Northern Mariana Islands

American servicemen's groups were set up to serve members in Saipan during World War II (1944 and 1945). One of these servicemen was L. Tom Perry. After World War II, military presence remained on the island and servicemen's groups existed off and on until full-time missionaries arrived on the island in 1975.

The first convert in Saipan was Juanita Augustine, from Palau, who was baptized on July 16, 1975. Later that year, a dependent branch was formed on the island. This became an independent branch on January 24, 1976. In 1980, the Saipan branch had 85 members. The branch became part of the Guam District on April 18, 1982.

=== Rota ===
Missionaries assigned to Rota arrived on September 5, 1986. Since then, missionaries have made infrequent trips to Rota and members attend church in Saipan.

=== Tinian ===
A few members moved to the island and in March 1990, the San Jose Branch was formed as part of the Guam District. Full-time missionaries arrived on August 14, 1992. The branch was discontinued in 1997. Since then, missionaries have made infrequent trips to Rota and members attend church in Saipan. The church donated more than $1,000 to the Red Cross and volunteers during the aftermath of Typhoon Yutu which made landfall on October 25, 2018.

== Stake and Congregations ==
As of May 2025, the Barrigada Guam Stake consists of 5 wards and 2 branches in Guam, Northern Marianna Islands, Yap (Micronesia), and Palau.

- Barrigada Ward (Guam)
- Colonia Branch (Yap)
- Dededo Ward (Guam)
- Koror Branch (Palau)
- Saipan Ward (Northern Marianna Islands)
- Santa Rita Ward (Guam)
- Yigo Ward (Guam)

== Missions ==
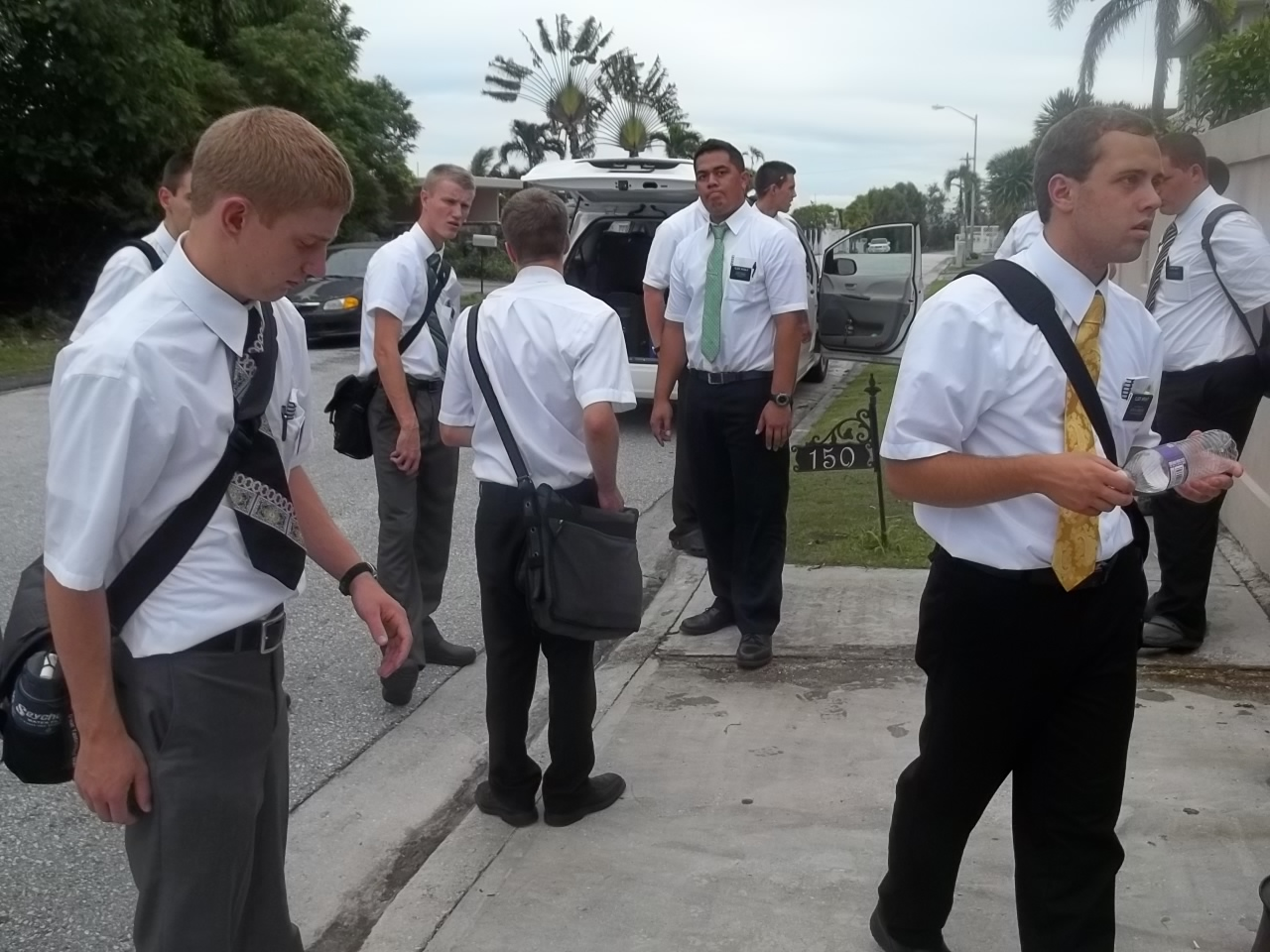
Missionaries in Guam

- The MGM covers Guam, the Northern Marianna Islands, Micronesia, and Palau.

== Temples ==
Groundbreaking for the Yigo Guam Temple was on September 4, 2019, with Yoon Hwan Choi, who was then president of the church's Asia North Area, presiding. The temple was dedicated by David A. Bednar on May 22, 2022.

172. Yigo Guam Temple; Official website; News & images	
Location: Announced: Groundbreaking: Dedicated: Size:	Yigo, Guam; 7 October 2018 by Russell M. Nelson; 4 May 2019 by Yoon Hwan Choi; 22 May 2022 by David A. Bednar; 6,861 sq ft (637.4 m^{2}) on a 5.8-acre (2.3 ha) site

== See also ==
- Religion in Guam
- Religion in Yap
- Religion in the Northern Mariana Islands
- Religion in Palau
