= Belém Brazil Temple =

Temple of the LDS Church

- Interactive map of Belém Brazil Temple
- Number: 174
- Dedication: 20 November 2022, by Dale G. Renlund
- Site: 6.7 acres (2.7 ha)
- Floor area: 28,675 ft^{2} (2,664.0 m^{2})
- Height: 89 ft (27 m)
- Official website • News & images

Church chronology
← Praia Cape Verde Temple	Belém Brazil Temple	→ Quito Ecuador Temple

Additional information
- Announced: 3 April 2016, by Thomas S. Monson
- Groundbreaking: 17 August 2019, by Marcos A. Aidukaitis
- Open house: 22 October-5 November 2022
- Current president: Wilson Lima Miranda
- Location: Belém, Brazil
- Coordinates: 1.3868°S 48.4600°W
- Exterior finish: Brazilian granite
- Baptistries: 1
- Ordinance rooms: 2
- Sealing rooms: 2
- Clothing rental: Yes

The Belém Brazil Temple is the 174th operating temple of the Church of Jesus Christ of Latter-day Saints (LDS Church), is located in Belém, Brazil, and is the ninth in the country. The intent to build the temple was announced on April 3, 2016, by Thomas S. Monson during the church's general conference. Following construction, the temple was dedicated on November 20, 2022.

== History ==
The intent to construct the temple was announced by church president Thomas S. Monson on April 3, 2016, during general conference. The Quito Ecuador and Harare Zimbabwe temples, along with a second temple in Lima, Peru, were announced at the same time.

The temple's groundbreaking was held on August 17, 2019, with Marcos A. Aidukaitis, president of the Brazil Area, presiding.

Following completion of construction, the temple was dedicated in three sessions on November 20, 2022 by Dale G. Renlund, of the Quorum of the Twelve Apostles. The temple in Belém was the ninth completed temple by the LDS Church in Brazil.

== Design and architecture ==
The temple is on a 6.7-acre plot, with its architecture reflecting both the cultural heritage of the Belem region and the spiritual significance of the church.

The temple has a single attached central spire that is 89 feet tall, and is constructed with Brazilian granite, like many of Brazil's other temples. The exterior has geometric design elements inspired by Marajoara indigenous pottery and the Victoria amazonica, which is also featured throughout the art glass designs. The blue, green, yellow and pink colors used were inspired from the Amazon rainforest. The church consulted Brazilian landscape experts to help identify the native species that would best fit the design.

The interior features interior artwork and decorations were inspired by Pará's culture and landscape. The interior decorations include flooring with national porcelain tile, carpet carvings made by a local craftsman, and entry rugs that mimic the design of the exterior art glass.

The temple includes two instruction rooms, two Sealing rooms, a baptistry, and a celestial room.

== See also ==
- List of temples of The Church of Jesus Christ of Latter-day Saints
- The Church of Jesus Christ of Latter-day Saints in Brazil
