= Praia Cape Verde Temple =

LDS CHurch temple in Praia, Cape Verde

- Interactive map of Praia Cape Verde Temple
- Number: 173
- Dedication: 19 June 2022, by Neil L. Andersen
- Site: 4.46 acres (1.80 ha)
- Floor area: 8,759 ft^{2} (813.7 m^{2})
- Height: 80 ft (24 m)
- Official website • News & images

Church chronology
← Yigo Guam Temple	Praia Cape Verde Temple	→ Belém Brazil Temple

Additional information
- Announced: 7 October 2018, by Russell M. Nelson
- Groundbreaking: 4 May 2019, by Paul V. Johnson
- Open house: 21 May-11 June 2022
- Current president: Austelino Silva
- Location: Praia, Cape Verde
- Coordinates: 14°55′06″N 23°30′42″W
- Baptistries: 1
- Ordinance rooms: 1
- Sealing rooms: 1

The Praia Cape Verde Temple is a temple of the Church of Jesus Christ of Latter-day Saints (LDS Church) in Praia, Cape Verde. The intent to build the temple was announced on October 7, 2018, by church president Russell M. Nelson, during general conference. The temple is the first built in Cape Verde. A groundbreaking ceremony, to signify the beginning of construction, was held on May 4, 2019, with Paul V. Johnson presiding.

== History ==
The intent to construct the temple was announced by church president Russell M. Nelson on October 7, 2018, concurrently with 11 other temples. At the time, the number of the church's total number of operating or announced temples was 201.

On May 4, 2019, a groundbreaking to signify beginning of construction was held, with Paul V. Johnson, president of the church's Europe Area, presiding. On March 3, 2022, the LDS Church announced that a public open house would be held from May 21 through June 11, 2022, excluding Sundays. The temple was dedicated on June 19, 2022 by Neil L. Andersen.

== Design and architecture ==
The building has an understated, clean design reminiscent of local architectural styles.

The temple is on a 4.46-acre plot, and the surrounding landscaping has gardens with flowering shrubs, plants, and both shade and palm trees, with various walkways leading to the building. A meetinghouse is also located on the site.

The temple is one story tall and has a single attached end tower, with its design inspired by local architecture. It is constructed with moleanos limestone from Portugal.

The temple includes one instruction room, one sealing room, and a baptistry, each arranged for ceremonial use. The instruction and sealing rooms are convertible, meaning the instruction room can function as a sealing room if necessary, and vice versa. The Praia Cape Verde Temple is the church's second to use convertible rooms, after the Yigo Guam Temple.

The design uses symbolic elements representing the heritage of the Praia region, providing spiritual meaning to the temple's appearance and function.

== Temple presidents ==
The church's temples are directed by a temple president and matron, each typically serving for a term of three years. The president and matron oversee the administration of temple operations and provide guidance and training for both temple patrons and staff.

Serving from 2022 to 2023, the temple's first president was Roberto F. Oliveira, with Eliana Oliveira as matron. As of 2024, Adriano F. Lopes and Teresinha Da Cruz Lopes are the president and matron.

== Admittance ==
Following the completion of the temple, the church held a public open house from May 21-June 11, 2022 (excluding Sundays). During the open house, over 10,000 people visited the temple. The temple was dedicated in three session by Neil L. Andersen, of the church's Quorum of the Twelve Apostles on June 19, 2022.

Like all the church's temples, it is not used for Sunday worship services. To members of the church, temples are regarded as sacred houses of the Lord. Once dedicated, only church members with a current temple recommend can enter for worship.

== See also ==
- The Church of Jesus Christ of Latter-day Saints in Cape Verde
- Comparison of temples of The Church of Jesus Christ of Latter-day Saints
- List of temples of The Church of Jesus Christ of Latter-day Saints
- List of temples of The Church of Jesus Christ of Latter-day Saints by geographic region
- Temple architecture (Latter-day Saints)
