= Yigo Guam Temple =

LDS Church temple in Yigo, Guam

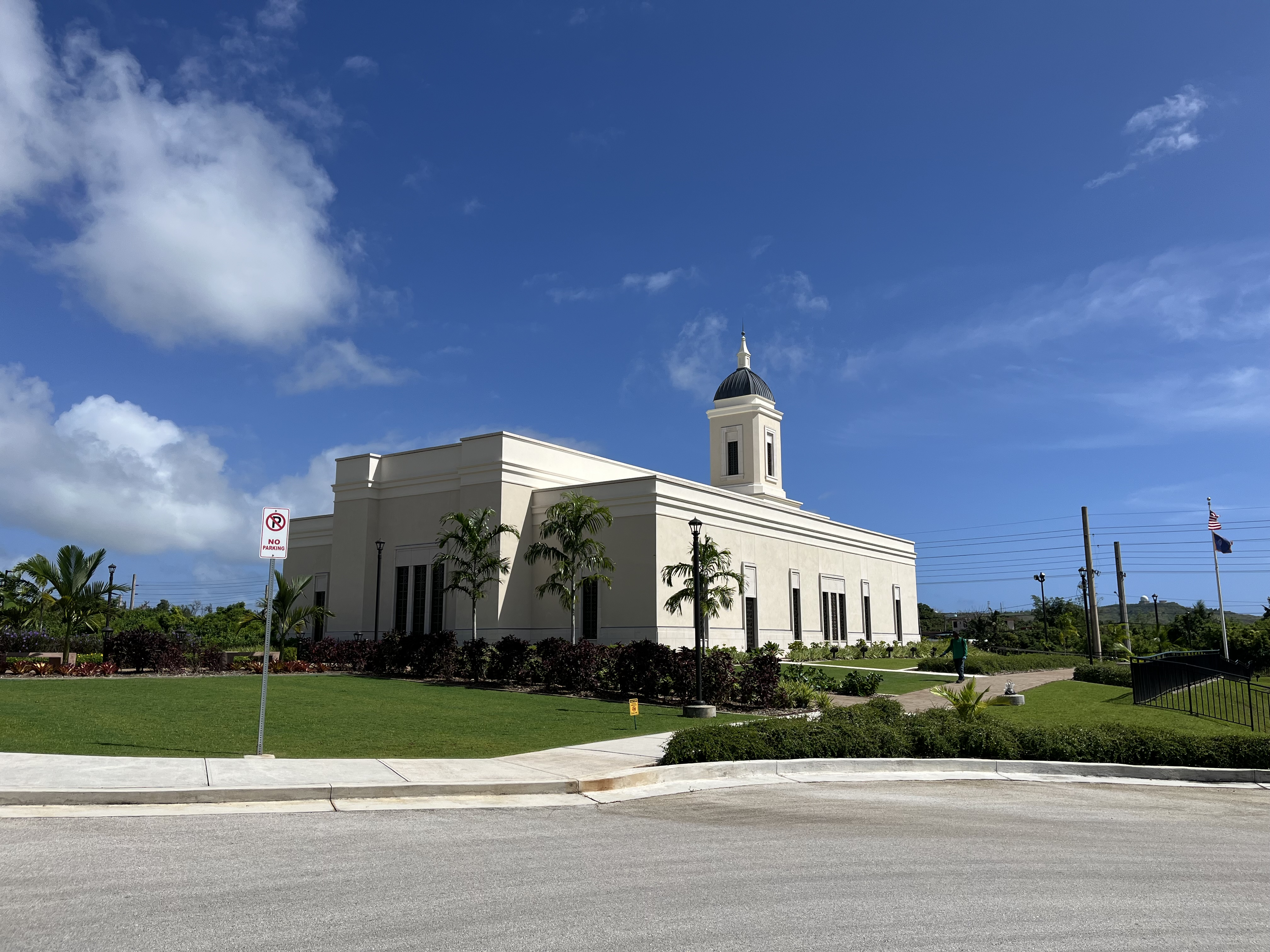
- Interactive map of Yigo Guam Temple
- Number: 172
- Dedication: 22 May 2022, by David A. Bednar
- Site: 5.8 acres (2.3 ha)
- Floor area: 6,861 ft^{2} (637.4 m^{2})
- Height: 74 ft (23 m)
- Official website • News & images

Church chronology
← Rio de Janeiro Brazil Temple	Yigo Guam Temple	→ Praia Cape Verde Temple

Additional information
- Announced: 7 October 2018, by Russell M. Nelson
- Groundbreaking: 4 May 2019, by Yoon Hwan Choi
- Open house: 4 May-14 May 2022
- Current president: Ross Henry Miller
- Location: Yigo, Guam
- Coordinates: 13°32′30.7428″N 144°53′22.3224″E
- Baptistries: 1
- Ordinance rooms: 1
- Sealing rooms: 1

The Yigo Guam Temple is a temple of the Church of Jesus Christ of Latter-day Saints (LDS Church) in Yigo, Guam. The intent to build the temple was announced on October 7, 2018, by church president Russell M. Nelson, during general conference.

== History ==
The intent to construct the temple was announced by church president Russell M. Nelson on October 7, 2018, concurrently with 11 others. At the time, the number of the church's total number of operating or announced temples was 201.

On May 4, 2019, a groundbreaking to signify beginning of construction was held, with Yoon Hwan Choi, president of the church's Asia North Area, presiding. On January 12, 2022, the LDS Church announced that a public open house would be held from May 4 through 14, 2022, excluding Sunday. To commemorate the temple’s completion, church members in Guam held a cultural celebration on May 20, 2022, during which young members performed dance and musical numbers. The temple was dedicated by David A. Bednar on May 22, 2022. The temple was built to serve 9,600 members living in Micronesia, including Saipan, Guam, Palau, and the Federated States of Micronesia.

The temple was closed for two months in 2023 after being flooded in May by Typhoon Mawar.

== Design and architecture ==
The building’s design was inspired by religious and community buildings in Guam, as well as traditional Latter-day Saint temple design. Its architecture reflects the cultural heritage of the region and its spiritual significance to the church.

The temple is on a 5.8-acre plot, and the landscaping around the temple features tropical trees, bushes, and shrubs, intended to provide a peaceful setting to enhances the sacred atmosphere. A meetinghouse containing a distribution center and an arrival center is also located on the site.

The structure stands one story tall, constructed with Moleanos limestone and beige stucco. The contemporary-style exterior was inspired by other religious and community buildings in Guam, and is characterized by visual references to ancient latte stones found in the area.

The interior features a “unique, artist-designed, three-dimensional bas-relief panel” in the baptistry, with twelve oxen representing the twelve tribes of Israel. The interior design also includes decorative paint and art glass with organic leaf patterns throughout the temple.

The temple includes an instruction room, a sealing room, the baptistry, and the celestial room, each arranged for ceremonial use. The Yigo Guam Temple is the church's first with convertible rooms, meaning that if necessary, the instruction room can be used as a sealing room, and vice versa.

The design has elements representing the heritage of the surrounding area, representing spiritual meaning in the temple's appearance and function. Symbolism is important to church members and include the front flanking entry columns, which are representative of ancient latte stones.

== Temple presidents ==
The church's temples are directed by a temple president and matron, each serving a three-year term. The president and matron oversee the administration of temple operations and provide guidance and training for both temple patrons and staff.

Since the temple's dedication in 2022, the president and matron have been Marlo O. Lopez and Memnet P. Lopez. In 2025, Ross Henry Miller and Debra Gay Wagner Miller, of the Barrigada Ward in the Barrigada Guam Stake, were called as the next president and matron of the Yigo Guam Temple. They began their service in September 2025, succeeding President and Sister Lopez.

== Admittance ==
Following the completion of the temple, a public open house was held from May 4–14, 2022. The temple was dedicated by David A. Bednar on May 22, 2022.

Like all the church's temples, it is not used for Sunday worship services. To members of the church, temples are regarded as sacred houses of the Lord. Once dedicated, only church members with a current temple recommend can enter for worship.

== See also ==
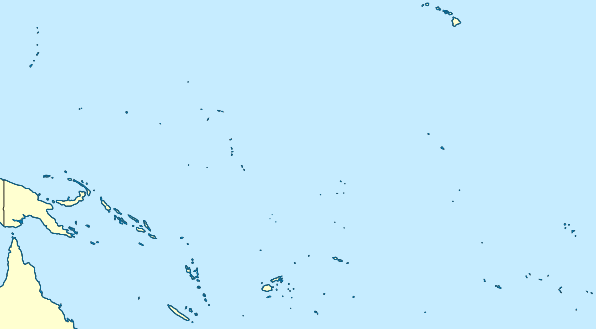
Temples in the Pacific Islands
- = Operating
- = Under construction
- = Announced
- = Temporarily Closed
- Comparison of temples of The Church of Jesus Christ of Latter-day Saints
- List of temples of The Church of Jesus Christ of Latter-day Saints
- List of temples of The Church of Jesus Christ of Latter-day Saints by geographic region
- Temple architecture (Latter-day Saints)
- The Church of Jesus Christ of Latter-day Saints in the Mariana Islands
