= Religion in Ecuador =

Religion in Ecuador (Census 2012)
1. Catholicism (74.0%)
2. Protestantism (10.4%)
3. Jehovah's Witnesses (1.2%)
4. Other (6.4%)
5. Atheism or agnosticism (8.0%)
Religion in Ecuador (Pew Research Center 2014)
1. Catholicism (79.0%)
2. Protestantism (13.0%)
3. Other Christian (2.00%)
4. No religious affiliation (5.00%)
5. Other religion (1.00%)

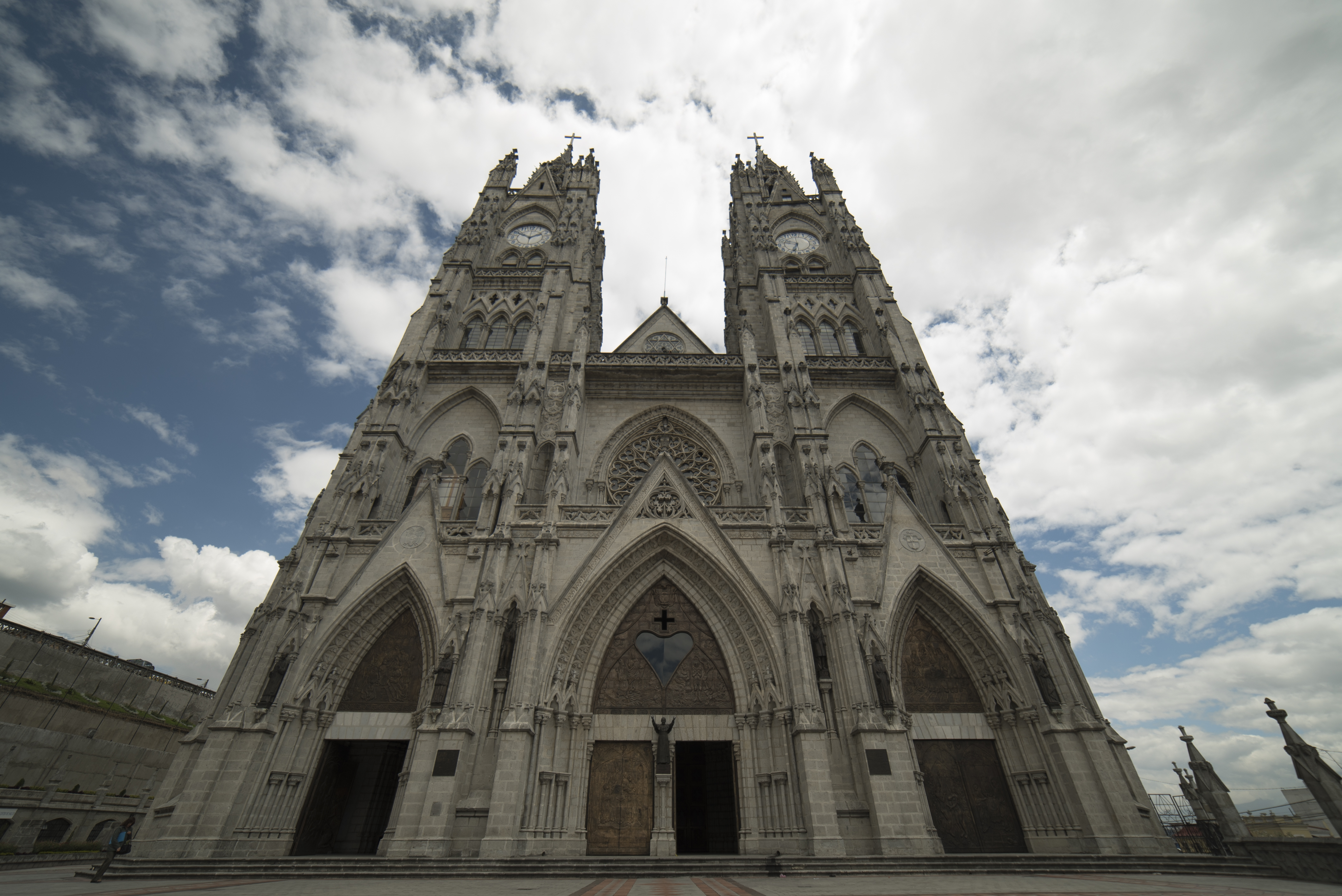
Basilica of the National Vow in the capital Quito; Christianity is main religion in Ecuador.

When it comes to religion, the Ecuadorian society is relatively homogeneous, with Christianity being the primary religion. Catholicism is the main Christian denomination in the country. There are also small minorities of other religions.

There are many old and new churches throughout the country and many more are being built by the Catholic Church. The Evangelical Missionary Union represents many Protestants in Ecuador; Anglican churches in Ecuador belong to Province 9 of the Episcopal Church in the United States of America. Other religions are present in small numbers: Eastern Orthodoxy, Mormonism, Buddhism, Judaism, Hinduism and Islam.

== Statistics ==
According to Latinobarómetro's 2018 public opinion survey, approximately 92% of respondents have a religious affiliation or belief. Of those, 74.8% are Catholic; 15.2% are evangelical Christian (including evangelical Baptists and Methodists); and 1.2% are Jehovah's Witnesses. Approximately 1.4% identify as members of other religious groups, including Seventh-day Adventists, the Church of Jesus Christ, Jews, and Protestants. Of those who do not identify with a religion, 0.8% identify as atheists while 6.1% have no religion.

According to the Ecuadorian National Institute of Statistics and Census in 2012 (the most recent year for which there are government statistics available), approximately 92 percent of the population professes a religious affiliation or belief. Of those with a religious affiliation 80.4% are Catholic, 11.3% are Protestants, 1.29% are Jehovah's Witnesses, and 6.96% have other religions.

== Christianity ==
=== Catholicism ===
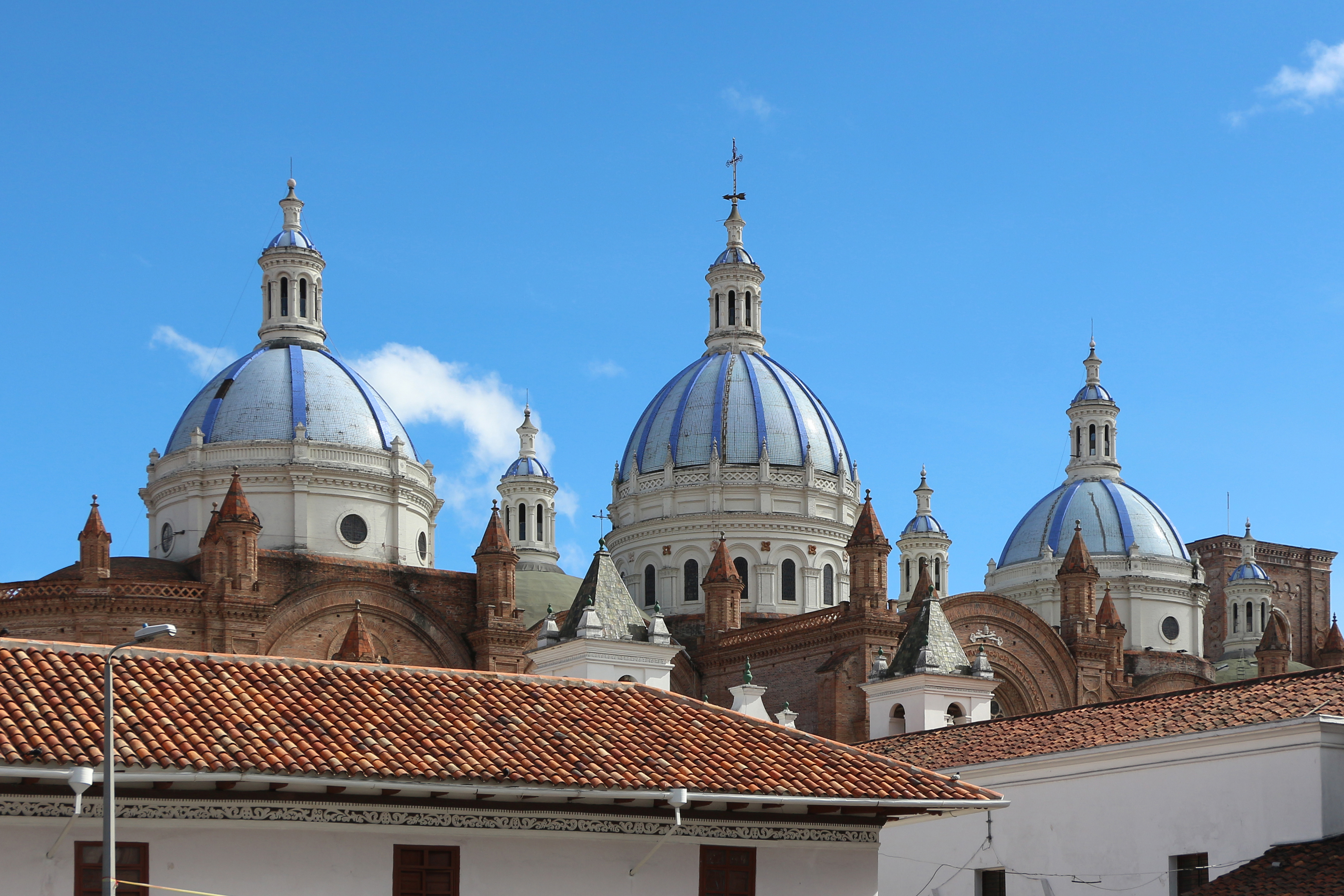
Arguably the most emblematic Church of Ecuador it's located in Cuenca.

After the Spanish colonization, Ecuador became a Christian country. The Catholic Church had and still has an important place in the Ecuadorian government and society. After the Constitution of 1869, the official religion became Catholicism and only Catholics could obtain citizenship. In 1899, the liberal government of Eloy Alfaro made a new constitution which respected all religions and guaranteed freedom of religious choice. Public education became free of religious influence. Nevertheless, private catholic schools still existed. Monsignor Antonio José Cardinal González Zumárraga is the emeritus Archbishop of Quito. He is in charge of the Ecuadorian Catholic Church.

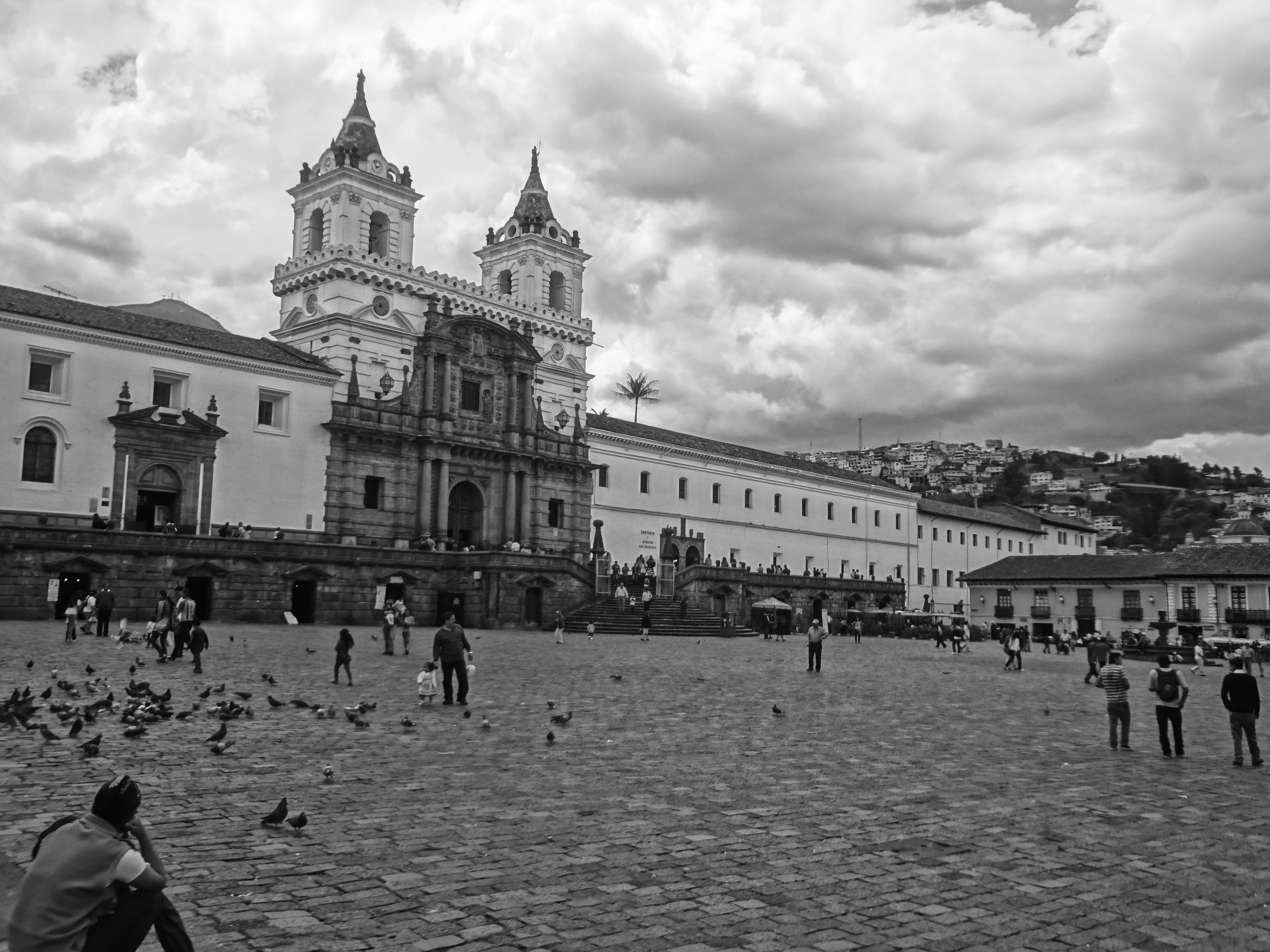
View of the Church of San Francisco in the Historic Center of Quito from the Plaza San Franciscopene

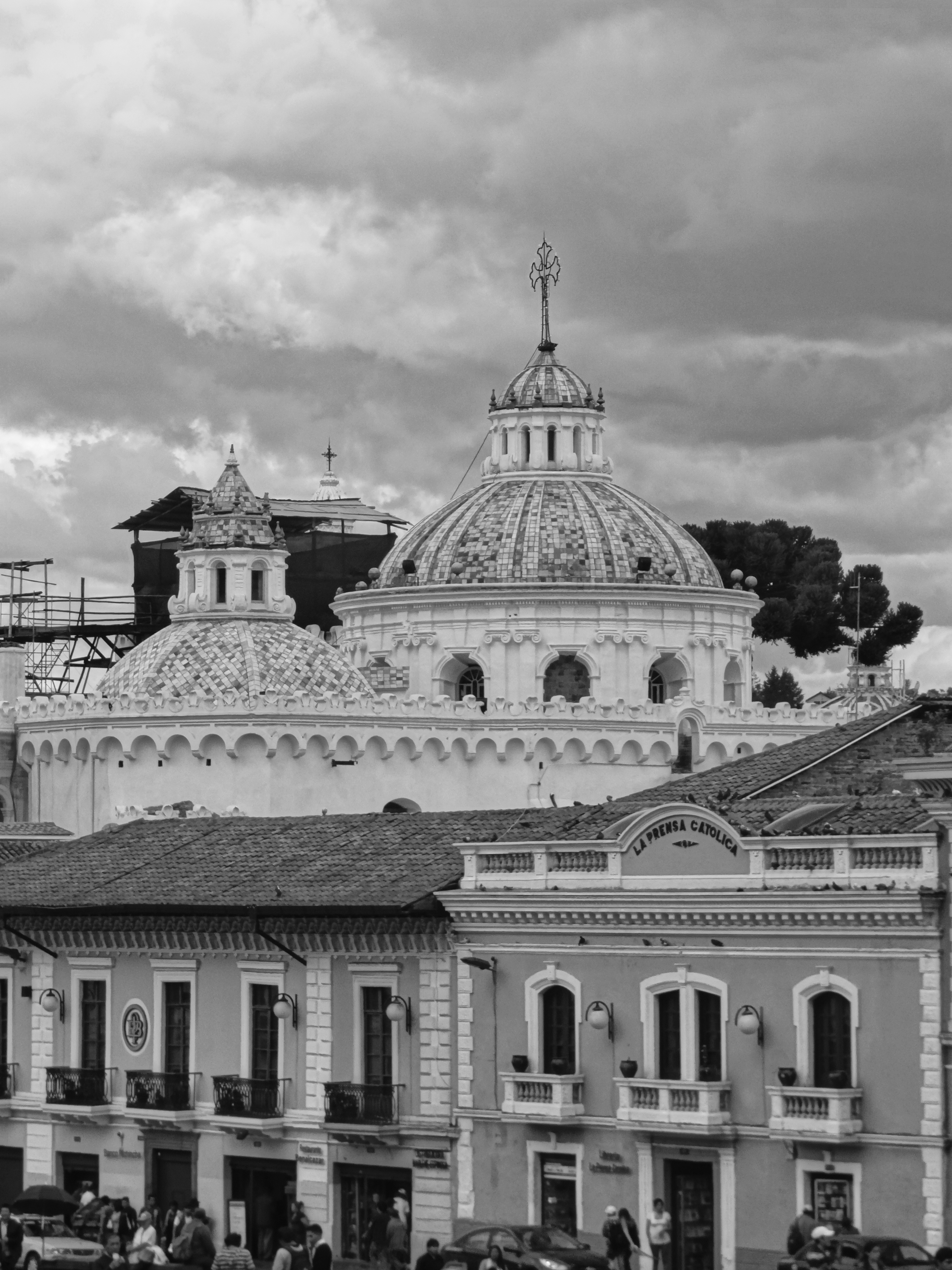
Dome roof of the La Compañía in Quito viewed from the Plaza San Francisco

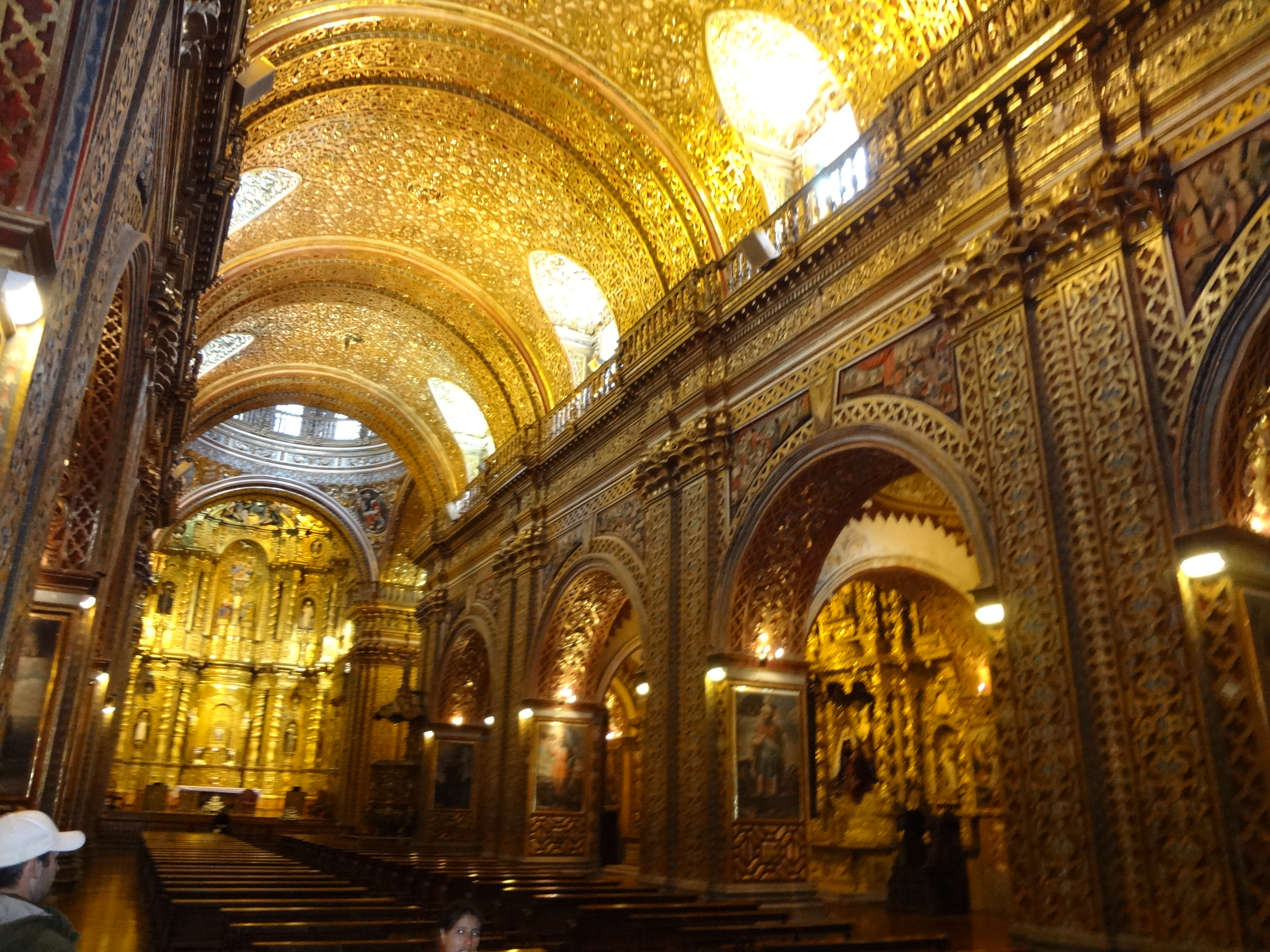
Gold leaf interior of the Church of the Society of Jesus, also referred to as - La Compañía - (Historic Center of Quito)

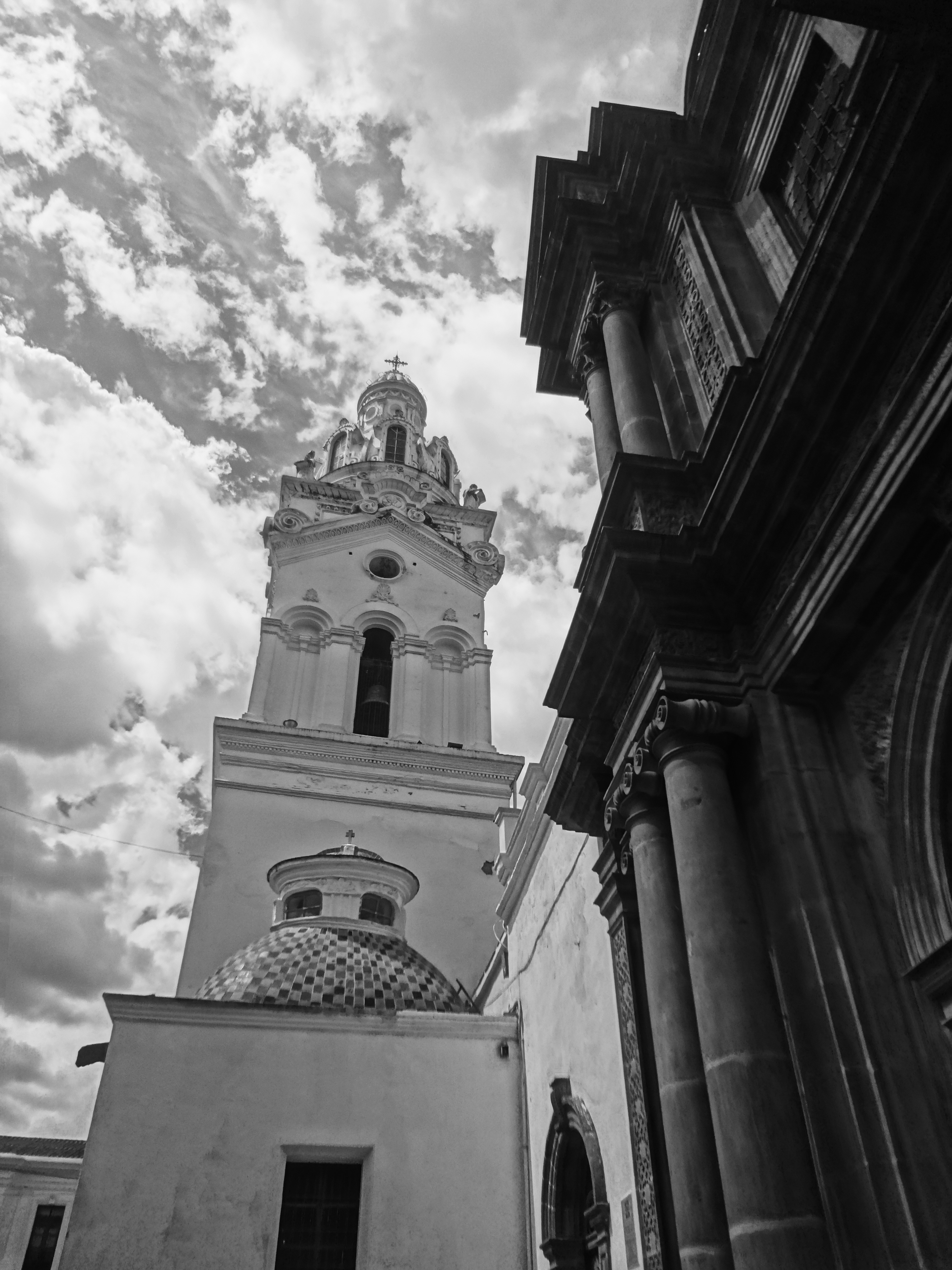
Metropolitan Cathedral of Quito

=== Protestantism ===
In Latin America, Protestants are most often called Evangelicals (Evangelicos). Ecuador now has about 11% of the population calling itself Protestant. Most are Pentecostals, but many denominations are active.

According to the 2020 census by Statista, the Protestant community represents 16.8% of Ecuador's population. It includes unspecified Evangelical (10.6%), Pentecostalism (3.7%), Seventh-day Adventist (1.2%), Baptist church (0.9%) and Methodist (0.2%).

=== Latter-day Saints ===
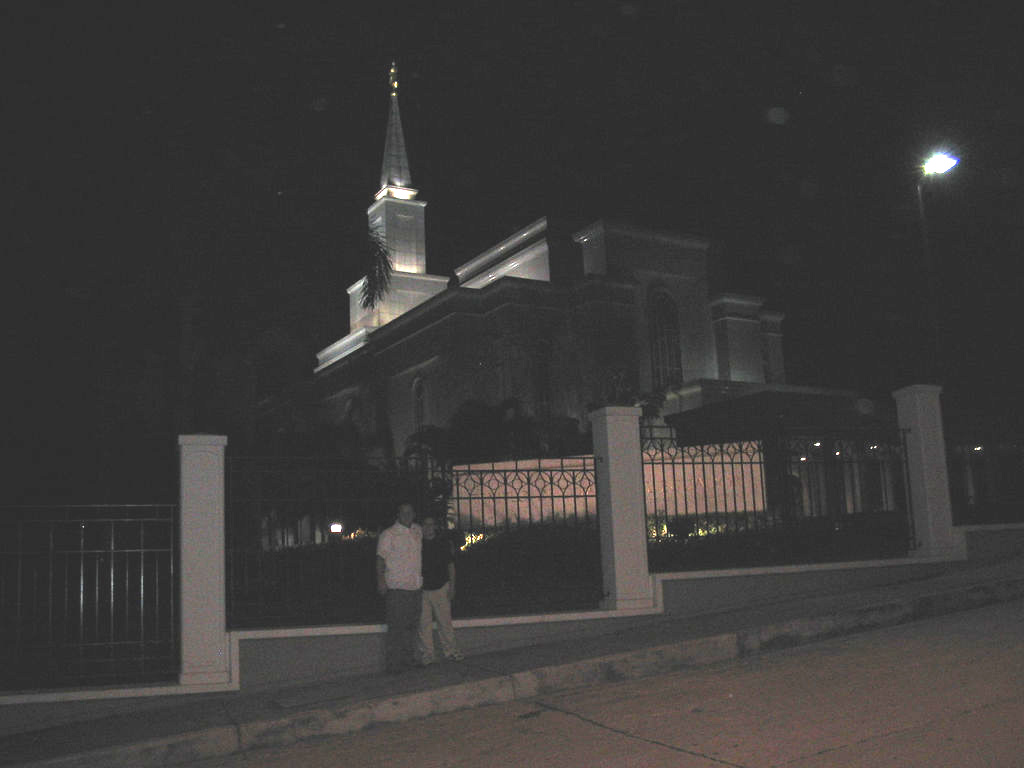
The Guayaquil Ecuador Temple (Mormon)

The first Mormon missionaries in Ecuador arrived in 1965. On August 1, 1999, the Guayaquil Ecuador Temple was dedicated by church president Gordon B. Hinckley.

Latter-day Saint membership in Ecuador has increased significantly in recent years. In 2008, the Church of Jesus Christ of Latter-day Saints reported having 185,663 members in Ecuador. As of 2024, 269,200 members of the church were reported to live in Ecuador.

=== Apostolics ===
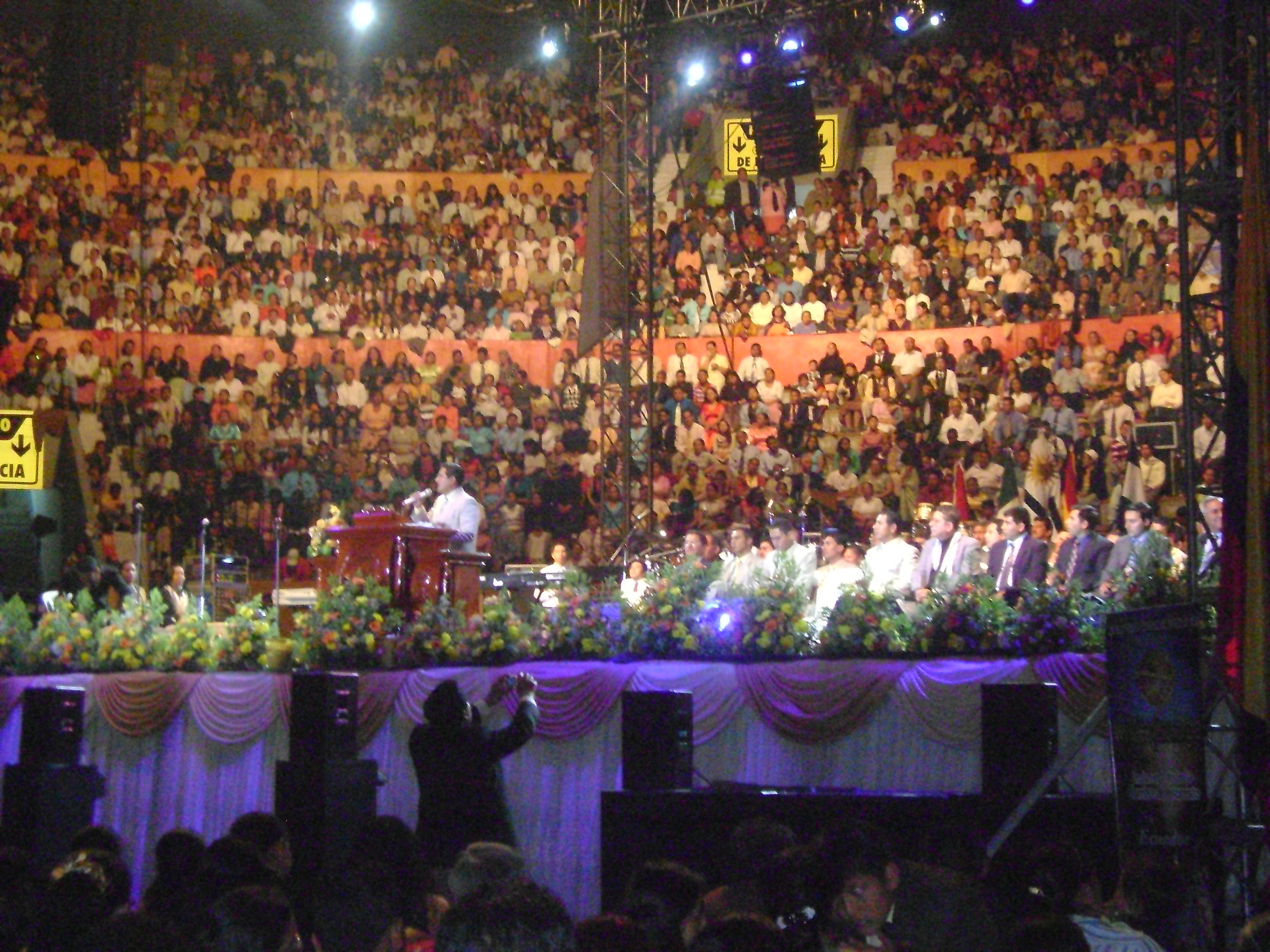
50th Anniversary Celebration

The Evangelical Apostolic Church of the Name of Jesus (Spanish: Iglesia Evangélica Apostólica del Nombre de Jesús) is the largest Apostolic/Pentecostal church in Ecuador with more than 100,000 members in Ecuador. Considered a Missionary Church, they have churches and missions in 18 countries, including the United States, Peru, Chile, Uruguay, Venezuela, the United Kingdom, El Salvador, Spain, Italy, Switzerland, Sweden, and the Netherlands.

== Judaism ==
The "Jewish Community of Ecuador" (Comunidad Judía del Ecuador) has its seat in Quito and has approximately 290 members. Nevertheless, this number is declining as young members leave the country, typically to move to the United States of America or Israel. The Community has a Jewish Center with a synagogue, a country club and a cemetery. It supports the Colegio Einstein, a private educational institution where Jewish history, religion and Hebrew classes are offered.

There is a very small community of Jewish people in Cuenca. The "Comunidad de Culto Israelita" reunites the Jews of Guayaquil. This community works independently from the "Jewish Community of Ecuador". Jewish visitors to Ecuador can also take advantage of Jewish resources as they travel and keep kosher there, even in the Amazon rainforest.

== Islam ==
The "Islam Community of Ecuador" (Comunidad Islámica del Ecuador) is of Sunni denomination and has approximately 60 members in Ecuador. It runs the Mosque Assalam in the city of Quito.

The "Asociación Islámica Cultural Khaled Ibn al Walidi" reunites the Arab Muslims in the country and has its seat in Quito.

The Islamic Center "Al Hijra" is located in Guayaquil, Ecuador's largest city and economic hub, with an estimated 85 members.

== Baháʼí Faith ==
The Baháʼí Faith, while being registered with the government, has small numbers in the country. The Baháʼí radio station in Otavalo, which started on October 12, 1977, was the first Baháʼí radio station in the world. The National Bahá'í governing body of Ecuador is based in Quito and Guayaquil.

== Buddhism ==
Buddhism was originally brought to Ecuador by immigrants from China and Japan. A large number of these immigrants and their descendants have retained their native religions with approximately 5,000 practicing Buddhists. In 1995 Taiwanese missionaries began building the Templo Mision Budista in Guayaquil. Finished in 2007, it opened its doors to the public in 2008 and is one of the largest Buddhist temples in South America.

== History ==
=== In the colony ===
The Catholic Church assumed a pivotal role in Ecuador virtually at the onset of the Spanish conquest. Catholicism was a central part of Hispanic culture, defining the ethos and worldview of the time. Through the Office of the Inquisition, the church examined the "purity" of possible officeholders. The church was virtually the only colonial institution dealing with education or the care of the needy. It amassed great wealth through donations, dowries, and outright purchases. Virtually every segment of the organization—the hierarchy, individual clerics, and religious orders—owned some form of assets.

=== After the independence ===
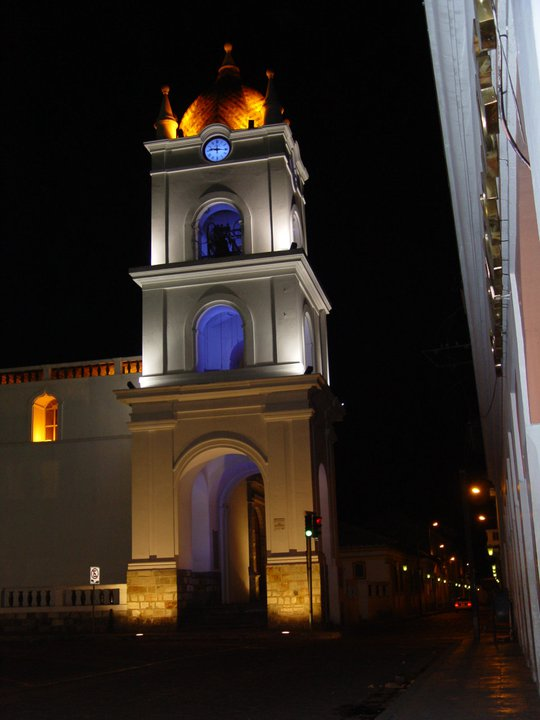
Latacunga's Church

The liberals' ascendancy in 1905 brought a series of drastic limitations to the Catholic Church's privileges. The state admitted representatives of other religions into the country, established a system of public education, and seized most of the church's rural properties. In addition, legislation formally abolished tithes (although many hacienda owners continued to collect them). The 1945 constitution (and the Constitution of 1979) firmly established freedom of religion and the separation of church and state.

=== Changes in the 1960s, 1970s and 1980s ===
Beginning in the 1960s, the country's Catholic bishops became increasingly active in supporting social change. Church leaders organized literacy campaigns among the Indians, distributed the institution's remaining lands, assisted peasants in acquiring land titles, and helped communities form cooperatives. In the 1970s and 1980s, the bishops espoused a centrist position on social and political issues. The episcopate contended that the unjust organization of Ecuadorian society caused many to live in misery. The bishops also claimed that the economic development of the 1970s and early 1980s had merely widened the gap between rich and poor. At the same time, however, Catholics were warned against employing Marxian analyses of society or endorsing violence or class conflict.

=== Church support for social reform ===
Church support for social reform occasionally brought it into conflict with government authorities. In 1976, for example, police arrested Riobamba bishop Leonidas Proaño Villalba—the episcopate's most outspoken critic of Ecuadorian society and politics—and sixteen other Latin American bishops who were attending a church conference in Chimborazo Province. After accusing the prelates of interfering in Ecuador's internal politics and discussing subversive subjects, the minister of interior released Proaño and expelled the foreign bishops from the country. Some Catholics formed groups to support conservative causes. The Committee of Young Christians for Christian Civilization, for example, advocated scuttling the "confiscatory and anti-Christian" agrarian reform laws.

== Internal organization of the Catholic Church in Ecuador ==
In 1986 the Catholic Church was organized into three archdioceses, ten dioceses, one territorial prelature, seven apostolic vicariates, and one apostolic prefecture. The church had only 1,505 priests to minister to a Catholic population of slightly more than 8 million, a ratio of 1 priest for every 5,320 Catholics.

Although approximately 94 percent of Ecuadorians were at least nominally Catholic at the time, most either did not practice their religion or pursued a syncretistic version. Most Sierra Indians, for example, followed a type of folk Catholicism in which doctrinal orthodoxy played only a small part. Indigenous beliefs combined with elements of Catholic worship. Much of community life focused on elaborate fiestas that marked both public and family events. Although the precise configuration of fiestas varied from community to community, in general public fiestas involved an individual in a series of increasingly demanding and expensive sponsorships (cargos) of specific religious celebrations. By the time individuals had completed all the expected cargos, they were recognized community leaders.

== Religious freedom ==
The separation of state and religion is since 1986 guaranteed.

The Ecuadorian Constitution of 1998 includes two articles providing for freedom of worship:

- Art. 23: States, among others that "all people are legally born free and equal and that they will not be discriminated on the basis of religion". It guarantees also the freedom of religion. "Freedom of religion is guaranteed. Every individual has the right to freely profess his/her religion and to disseminate it individually or collectively. All religious faiths and churches are equally free before the law." The right to declare or not about ones religious affiliation is also guaranteed.
- Art. 81: Prohibits publicity that encourages violence, racism, sexism, religious or political intolerance.

In 2023, the country was scored 4 out of 4 for religious freedom.

== Conversions ==
The Catholic Church's relatively weak presence in the countryside and in squatter settlements, coupled with the nominal, syncretistic practice of most Catholics, created a fertile ground for Protestant evangelical and Pentecostal missionary activity. Although multidenominational groups such as the Gospel Missionary Union (GMU) had been active in Ecuador since the beginning of the twentieth century, significant levels of conversion did not occur until the late 1960s. By the late 1970s, the GMU reported that it had converted 20,000 Sierra Indians in Chimborazo Province alone. The Christian and Missionary Alliance indicated that conversions among Indians in Otavalo climbed from 28 in 1969 to 900 in 1979. By the mid-1980s, an estimated 50,000 Ecuadorians had converted to the Church of Jesus Christ of Latter-day Saints. Other significant forces in the Protestant camp included World Vision, an evangelical development group based in California, and the Summer Institute of Linguistics (SIL). The Texas-based SIL dispatched linguists to remote areas of Ecuador to study and codify tribal languages. The eventual goal of such efforts was to translate the Bible.

The phenomenal pace of conversion — some observers estimated that evangelicals and Pentecostals totaled 40 percent of the population in Chimborazo Province in the late 1980s — affected social relations in rural areas. Change in religious affiliation was a major rupture with an individual's past traditions and social ties, effectively removing them from participation in fiestas—a major focus of much of community life. Families and extended families found the break with the rest of the community easier in the company of fellow converts. Protestantism replaced the patterns of mutual reciprocity characteristic of peasant social relations with a network of sharing and support among fellow believers. This support system extended to migrants; converts who left for the city or the coast sought out their coreligionists for assistance in finding lodging and employment even as Catholics looked to their compadres.
