= Guayaquil Ecuador Temple =

LDS Church temple in Guayaquil, Ecuador

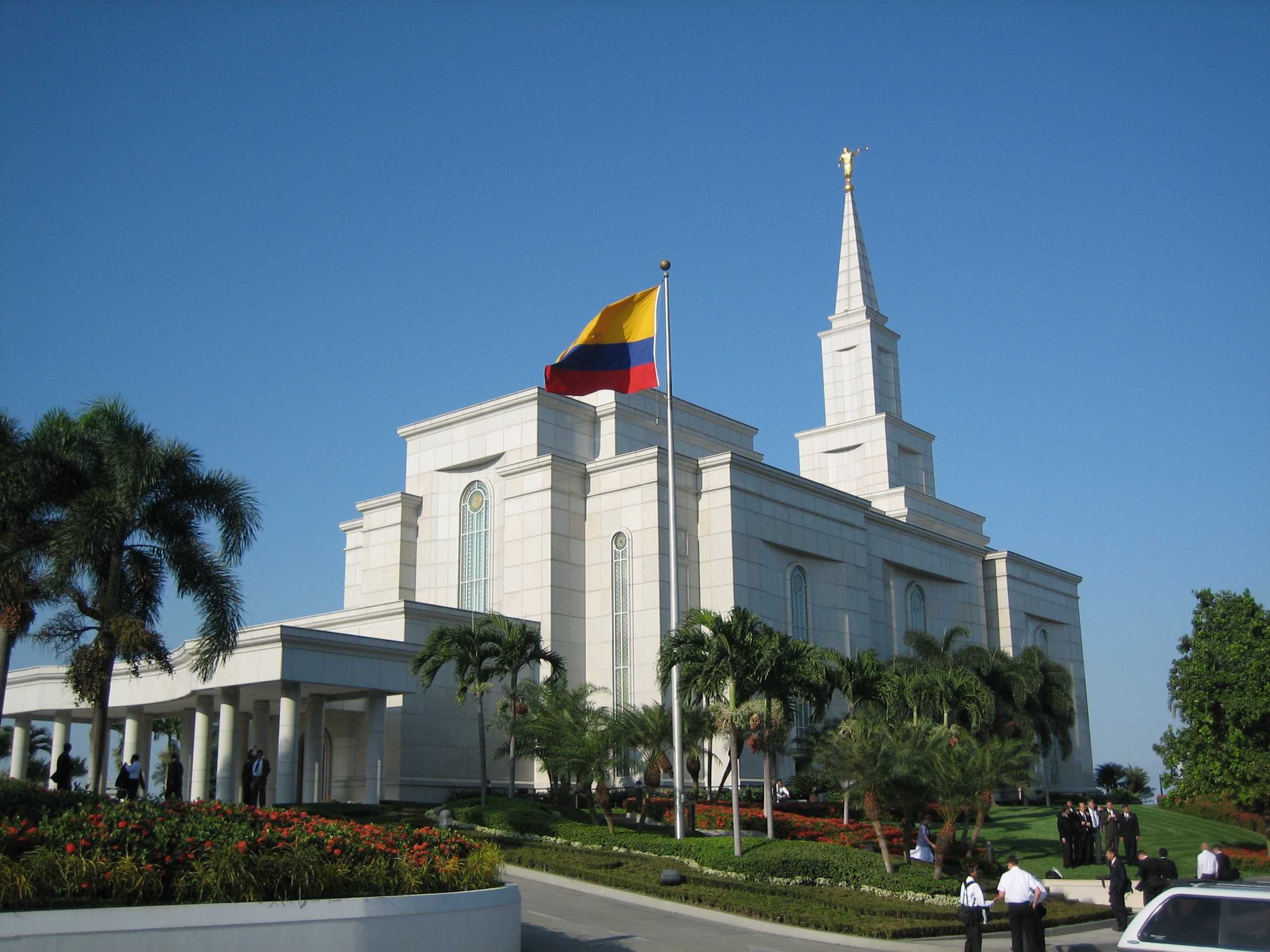
- Interactive map of Guayaquil Ecuador Temple
- Number: 58
- Dedication: 1 August 1999, by Gordon B. Hinckley
- Site: 6.2 acres (2.5 ha)
- Floor area: 45,000 ft^{2} (4,200 m^{2})
- Official website • News & images

Church chronology
← Bogotá Colombia Temple	Guayaquil Ecuador Temple	→ Spokane Washington Temple

Additional information
- Announced: 31 March 1982, by Spencer W. Kimball
- Groundbreaking: 10 August 1996, by Richard G. Scott
- Open house: 23 June – 5 July 1999
- Current president: Byron Wladimir Manzo Castillo
- Designed by: Rafael Velez Calisto, Architects & Consultants and Church A&E Services
- Location: Guayaquil, Ecuador
- Coordinates: 2°9′22.48559″S 79°54′17.55719″W
- Exterior finish: Brazilian granite, Asa Branca
- Design: Classic modern, single-spire design
- Baptistries: 1
- Ordinance rooms: 4 (stationary)
- Sealing rooms: 3
- Clothing rental: Yes

The Guayaquil Ecuador Temple is a temple of the Church of Jesus Christ of Latter-day Saints in Guayaquil, Ecuador. The groundbreaking ceremony was in August 1996, and the dedication in August 1999.

In 2016, Caracol Radio reported that a Spanish real estate marketing company called Nuroa evaluated the Guayaquil temple to be worth US $14,456,000.

== See also ==
Temples in Ecuador
- = Operating
- = Under construction
- = Announced
- = Temporarily Closed

* List of temples of The Church of Jesus Christ of Latter-day Saints

- The Church of Jesus Christ of Latter-day Saints in Ecuador
